= 107.9 FM =

FM radio frequency

The following radio stations broadcast on FM frequency 107.9 MHz:

== Argentina ==
- Cristal in Rosario, Santa Fe
- Vida Santa Fe in Santa Fe de la Vera Cruz, Santa Fe
- Identidad in Bragado, Buenos Aires
- Sol in Crespo, Entre Ríos
- Ultra in La Plata, Buenos Aires
- Panda in Buenos Aires
- La Isla in San Fernando del Valle de Catamarca, Catamarca
- La Estación in Salta, Salta
- Del norte in Corrientes

== Australia ==
- 2AIR in Coffs Harbour, New South Wales
- 4ROK in Rockhampton, Queensland
- 3PNN in Bairnsdale, Victoria
- 5RAM in Adelaide, South Australia
- 2ICE in Lithgow, New South Wales
- 6CCR in Fremantle, Western Australia
- Radio National in Eden, New South Wales
- Radio National in Rosebery, Tasmania
- Sky Sports Radio in Yass, New South Wales
- 2COW in Casino, New South Wales

== Canada (Channel 300) ==
- CFLB-FM in Lunenburg, Nova Scotia
- CFML-FM/VF2448 in Burnaby, British Columbia
- CFSI-FM in Salt Spring Island, British Columbia
- CFSM-FM-1 in Fernie, British Columbia
- CFTA-FM in Amherst, Nova Scotia
- CHUC-FM in Cobourg, Ontario
- CIBM-FM-1 in Riviere-du-Loup, Quebec
- CILS-FM in Victoria, British Columbia
- CIRI-FM in Calgary, Alberta
- CJNU-FM in Winnipeg, Manitoba
- CJXY-FM in Burlington, Ontario
- CKBG-FM in Amherstburg, Ontario
- CKDJ-FM in Ottawa, Ontario
- CKFT-FM in Fort Saskatchewan, Alberta
- CKPP-FM in Prescott, Ontario

== China ==
- CNR China Rural Radio in Donggang
- CNR Easy Radio in Xiamen, Zhangzhou and south of Quanzhou

== Greece ==
- Radio Fani in Xania
- Court Radio in Halkidiki
- H Fonh ton Litochorou in Katerini
- Chocolate FM in Kalamata

== Indonesia ==
- Hang Tuah FM in Batam and Singapore
- MTA FM in Surakarta

== Malaysia ==
- Bernama Radio in Kota Kinabalu, Sabah
- Minnal FM in Taiping, Perak
- Radio Klasik in Kuantan, Pahang
- rakita in Klang Valley

== Mexico ==
- XHCHZ-FM in Chiapa de Corzo, Chiapas
- XHCSM-FM in San Luis Potosí, San Luis Potosí
- XHDAB-FM in Hidalgo del Parral, Chihuahua
- XHEMA-FM in Fresnillo, Zacatecas
- XHFH-FM in Agua Prieta, Sonora
- XHIMR-FM in Mexico City
- XHJP-FM in Santa María Tlahuitoltepec, Oaxaca
- XHPC-FM in Piedras Negras, Coahuila
- XHPED-FM in San Pedro Tapanatepec, Oaxaca
- XHQG-FM in La Noria, Querétaro
- XHRCV-FM in San Antonino Castillo Velasco, Oaxaca
- XHRHI-FM in Uruapan, Michoacán
- XHRIG-FM in Villa Tututepec, Oaxaca
- XHSCAK-FM in Taxco de Alarcón, Guerrero
- XHSCAN-FM in Cabo San Lucas, Baja California Sur
- XHSCAS-FM in Chilpancingo, Guerrero
- XHSCBH-FM in Ensenada, Baja California
- XHSCDG-FM in Tlapa De Comonfort, Guerrero
- XHSCFY-FM in Coahuayana, Michoacán
- XHSCIU-FM in Tlahualilo, Durango
- XHSIBH-FM in Vicam, Guaymas municipality, Sonora
- XHSIBI-FM in Ejido Ignacio Allende, Tenosique municipality, Tabasco
- XHSLR-FM in San Luis Río Colorado, Sonora
- XHTEQ-FM in Tequila, Jalisco
- XHTFM-FM in Mazatlán Villa de Flores, Oaxaca
- XHTM-FM in Tepalcatepec, Michoacán
- XHTUMI-FM in El Malacate, Michoacán
- XHUGO-FM in Ocotlán, Jalisco
- XHVIC-FM in Ciudad Victoria, Tamaulipas
- XHWE-FM in Irapuato, Guanajuato
- XHYRE-FM in Mérida, Yucatán
- XHZV-FM in Zapotitlán de Vadillo, Jalisco
- XHSCLO-FM in Coatzacoalcos, Veracruz

== Philippines ==
- DWHT-FM in Dagupan City
- DWMW-FM in Naga City
- DWOK-FM in Puerto Princesa City
- DYNY-FM in Iloilo City
- DXNY-FM in Cagayan de Oro City
- DYDT in Toledo City
- B107.9 in Tacloban City
- DXWG in Tagum City

== Taiwan ==
- Transfer CNR Easy Radio in Kinmen

== United Kingdom ==
- Afan FM (Port Talbot frequency)
- CamGlen Radio (Rutherglen and Cambuslang)
- GTFM in Pontypridd
- KMFM Medway
- L107
- Fosse 107 in Hinckley and Nuneaton
- Greatest Hits Radio South West in Bath
- Hits Radio Oxfordshire
- Islands FM (formerly known as Radio Scilly)
- Hits Radio Cambridgeshire in Haverhill
- Greatest Hits Radio South Yorkshire (Worksop frequency)
- The Cat (Crewe and Nantwich)

== United States (Channel 300) ==
- KAOX in Shelley, Idaho
- KASP-LP in Aspen, Colorado
- KBDL-LP in Carbondale, Colorado
- KBKL in Grand Junction, Colorado
- KBPL in Pueblo, Colorado
- KBQI in Albuquerque, New Mexico
- KCKO in Rio Rico, Arizona
- KCLQ in Lebanon, Missouri
- KCYE in Meadview, Nevada
- KEAE-LP in Eagle, Colorado
- KELQ in Flandreau, South Dakota
- KEYB in Altus, Oklahoma
- KEYJ-FM in Abilene, Texas
- KEZA in Fayetteville, Arkansas
- KFAN-FM in Johnson City, Texas
- KFIN in Jonesboro, Arkansas
- KFMW in Waterloo, Iowa
- KDXX in Lewisville, Texas
- KGCE-LP in Modesto, California
- KGCO-LP in Crete, Nebraska
- KHDV in Darby, Montana
- KHEZ-LP in Cape Girardeau, Missouri
- KHOA-LP in Hope, Arkansas
- KHPE in Albany, Oregon
- KHXT in Erath, Louisiana
- KINF-LP in Palestine, Texas
- KIVD-LP in Bossier City, Louisiana
- KIXS in Victoria, Texas
- KJCR-LP in Grants Pass, Oregon
- KJHS-LP in Wenatchee, Washington
- KJTM-LP in Lincoln, Nebraska
- KKLC in Fall River Mills, California
- KKOL-FM in Aiea, Hawaii
- KKRF in Stuart, Iowa
- KLEV-LP in Leadville, Colorado
- KLLE in North Fork, California
- KLNX-LP in Minturn, Colorado
- KLTE in Kirksville, Missouri
- KMBI-FM in Spokane, Washington
- KMCR-LP in Moorpark, California
- KMLE in Chandler, Arizona
- KOUV-LP in Vancouver, Washington
- KOXC-LP in Oxnard, California
- KPAW in Fort Collins, Colorado
- KPFX in Kindred, North Dakota
- KPPA-LP in Mexia, Texas
- KPRT-FM in Kirtland, New Mexico
- KQEL in Alamogordo, New Mexico
- KQLM in Odessa, Texas
- KQQK in Beaumont, Texas
- KQQL in Anoka, Minnesota
- KQRU-LP in Santa Clarita, California
- KRFL-LP in Fulton, Missouri
- KRLG-LP in Kremmling, Colorado
- KRQC-LP in Davenport, Iowa
- KRVJ-LP in Jacksonville, Texas
- KRVK in Vista West, Wyoming
- KSEA in Greenfield, California
- KTGY-LP in Nipomo, California
- KTIC-FM in West Point, Nebraska
- KTLH in Hallsville, Texas
- KUMP-LP in Days Creek, Oregon
- KUMT in Randolph, Utah
- KUZZ-FM in Bakersfield, California
- KVLY in Edinburg, Texas
- KVTS-LP in Republic, Missouri
- KWLS in Winfield, Kansas
- KWPW in Robinson, Texas
- KWVE-FM in San Clemente, California
- KXLT-FM in Eagle, Idaho
- KXVR-LP in Corpus Christi, Texas
- KXWF-LP in Wichita Falls, Texas
- KXZT in Newell, South Dakota
- KYRF-LP in Yakima, Washington
- KYXZ-LP in Arroyo Grande, California
- KZIS in Sacramento, California
- KZLM in Lewistown, Montana
- KZRK-FM in Canyon, Texas
- KZRS in Great Bend, Kansas
- KZSR-LP in Paso Robles, California
- WAJF-LP in Decatur, Alabama
- WAMW-FM in Washington, Indiana
- WBCV in Wausau, Wisconsin
- WBQK in West Point, Virginia
- WBTB-LP in Erie, Pennsylvania
- WBTF in Midway, Kentucky
- WCDD in Canton, Illinois
- WCDY in McBain, Michigan
- WCFT-LP in Dover, New Jersey
- WCRZ in Flint, Michigan
- WCVQ in Fort Campbell, Kentucky
- WDBN in Wrightsville, Georgia
- WDRW-LP in Athens, Georgia
- WDSG-LP in Sanford, North Carolina
- WDSY-FM in Pittsburgh, Pennsylvania
- WDTF-LP in Berkeley Springs, West Virginia
- WDWS-FM in Arcola, Illinois
- WEAT in West Palm Beach, Florida
- WEBE in Westport, Connecticut
- WEES-LP in Ocean City, Maryland
- WELV-LP in Ellenville, New York
- WEMM-FM in Huntington, West Virginia
- WENZ in Cleveland, Ohio
- WFBS-LP in Salem, South Carolina
- WFCA in Ackerman, Mississippi
- WFMX in Skowhegan, Maine
- WFSD-LP in Tallahassee, Florida
- WGTR in Bucksport, South Carolina
- WGUP-LP in Laplace, Louisiana
- WHTA in Hampton, Georgia
- WIMM-LP in Owensboro, Kentucky
- WJED-LP in Guanica, Puerto Rico
- WJFX in New Haven, Indiana
- WJPV-LP in Gainesville, Georgia
- WJXC-LP in Jackson, Mississippi
- WJZP-LP in Portland, Maine
- WKPA in Port Matilda, Pennsylvania
- WKRF in Tobyhanna, Pennsylvania
- WKNY in Kingston, New York
- WKYR-FM in Burkesville, Kentucky
- WLDV in Frederiksted, U.S. Virgin Islands
- WLEY-FM in Aurora, Illinois
- WLHZ-LP in Springfield, Massachusetts
- WLJD in Charlevoix, Michigan
- WLJX-LP in Springfield, Illinois
- WLLU-LP in Decatur, Illinois
- WLNK in Charlotte, North Carolina
- WLPV-LP in Greenfield, Massachusetts
- WLXM-LP in Lexington, South Carolina
- WLZL in College Park, Maryland
- WMCB-LP in Greenfield, Massachusetts
- WMDI-LP in Lakewood, New Jersey
- WMFM in Key West, Florida
- WMLZ-LP in Temperance, Michigan
- WMRK-FM in Orrville, Alabama
- WMUS in Muskegon, Michigan
- WNBI-LP in New Buffalo, Michigan
- WNCT-FM in Greenville, North Carolina
- WNDN in Chiefland, Florida
- WNTR in Indianapolis, Indiana
- WOGT in East Ridge, Tennessee
- WOLD-LP in Woodbridge, New Jersey
- WOTH in Williamsport, Pennsylvania
- WPFM in Panama City, Florida
- WPHC-LP in Spring Hill, Florida
- WPPZ-FM in Pennsauken, New Jersey
- WQET-LP in Middletown, New York
- WQJC-LP in Quincy, Illinois
- WRFA-LP in Jamestown, New York
- WRML-LP in Mays Landing, New Jersey
- WRWN in Port Royal, South Carolina
- WSRX-LP in Vernon, New Jersey
- WSRZ-FM in Coral Cove, Florida
- WSSY-LP in Greensboro, North Carolina
- WUAF-LP in Lake City, Florida
- WUCR-LP in Lake Butler, Florida
- WVAC-FM in Adrian, Michigan
- WVMB-LP in Madison, Alabama
- WVMX in Westerville, Ohio
- WVPJ-LP in Mayaguez, Puerto Rico
- WVPS in Burlington, Vermont
- WWAG in McKee, Kentucky
- WWHT in Syracuse, New York
- WWMA-LP in Avon Park, Florida
- WWPH in Princeton Junction, New Jersey
- WWRQ-FM in Valdosta, Georgia
- WXKS-FM in Medford, Massachusetts
- WXRU-LP in Piedmont, South Carolina
- WYHJ-LP in Gulf Breeze, Florida
- WYKQ-LP in Aguadilla-Aguada, Puerto Rico
- WYYD in Amherst, Virginia
- WZEN-LP in Hammond, Louisiana
- WZKX in Bay Saint Louis, Mississippi
