= WIMM =

WIMM may refer to:

- The ICAO code for Kuala Namu International Airport
- WIMM-LP, a low-power radio station (107.7 FM) licensed to Owensboro, Kentucky, United States
- "Where is My Mind?", a 1988 song by American alternative rock band Pixies
- WIMM One, a wearable computing device by Wimm Labs
