= KTIC =

KTIC may refer to:

- KTIC (AM), a radio station (840 AM) licensed to West Point, Nebraska, United States
- KTIC-FM, a radio station (107.9 FM) licensed to West Point, Nebraska, United States
