= KJCR =

KJCR may refer to:

- KJCR (AM), a radio station (1240 AM) licensed to Billings, Montana, United States
- KJCR-LP, a radio station (107.9 FM) licensed to Grant's Pass, Oregon, United States
- KJRN, a radio station (88.3 FM) licensed to Keene, Texas, United States, which held the call sign KJCR from 1984 to 2010
