= KGCE =

KGCE may refer to:

- KGCE-LD, a low-power television station (channel 14, virtual 23) licensed to serve Garden City, Kansas, United States
- KGCE-LP, a low-power radio station (107.9 FM) licensed to serve Modesto, California, United States
- KSSL, a radio station (107.3 FM) licensed to serve Post, Texas, United States, which held the call sign KGCE from 2009 to 2011
