= KWPN =

KWPN may refer to:

- Koninklijk Warmbloed Paard Nederland, the registry for the Dutch Warmblood breed of horse, Koninklijk Warmbloed Paardenstamboek Nederland (Royal Warmblood Studbook of the Netherlands), also sometimes used to designate a horse of the breed
- Former call sign for radio station KTIC-FM
- KWPN (AM), an Oklahoma City radio station associated with ESPN and WWLS-FM
