= WSGJ-LP =

- Bowling Green, Kentucky; United States
- Broadcast area: Warren County and some surrounding areas
- Frequency: 92.1 MHz
- Branding: St. Gabriel Radio at St. Joseph

Programming
- Format: Catholic religious
- Affiliations: EWTN Radio

Ownership
- Owner: St. Joseph Catholic Church; (Columbus Club, Inc.)

History
- First air date: March 2017
- Call sign meaning: Saints Gabriel and Joseph

Technical information
- Licensing authority: FCC
- Facility ID: 192729
- Class: L1
- ERP: 0.1 kW = 100 W
- HAAT: 2.2 feet (0.67 m)
- Transmitter coordinates: 37°0′4.40″N 86°26′46.30″W

Links
- Public license information: LMS

WSGJ-LP (92.1 FM) is a Catholic religious radio station that is licensed to and located in Bowling Green, Kentucky, United States. The low-powered FM radio station is owned by Columbus Club, Inc., and operated by St. Gabriel Catholic Radio, Inc. at the St. Joseph Roman Catholic Church and School in Bowling Green.

== History ==
After the Federal Communications Commission granted a construction permit in February 2014, the St. Joseph Catholic Church began construction of a new religious radio station in the Bowling Green area. The station's transmitter was erected in February 2017, five months after the church purchased the tower. In March 2017, WSGJ-LP went on the air as the Bowling Green area's fourth religious radio station after WAYD/Auburn and WCVK, along with W203BI, which was a translator of WLOG of Markleysburg, Pennsylvania. WSGJ-LP has also become the fifth low-powered FM station in the area not repeating another locally based analog radio station's signal.

WSGP-LP went on the air with an affiliation with EWTN Radio. Some programming outside of the EWTN radio lineup originates from partner station WIMM-LP in Owensboro, thereby simulcasting that station's local programming.

== Coverage area ==
The station's signal mainly serves the Warren County area. If WSGJ gets approval to increase its effective radiated power to 250 watts (0.25 kW), nearby sections of surrounding counties could be added to the station's signal coverage area.

== See also ==
- WEUC: Catholic radio station in Morganfield, Kentucky
