= KSEA =

KSEA may refer to:

- The ICAO code for Seattle–Tacoma International Airport
- KSEA (FM), a radio station (107.9 FM) licensed to Greenfield, California, United States
- KMYX-FM, a radio station (92.5 FM) licensed to Arvin, California, United States, which formerly used the call sign KSEA
- KKWF, a radio station (100.7 FM) licensed to Seattle, Washington, United States, which used the call sign KSEA until April 1991
