= KOXC =

KOXC may refer to:

- KOXC-LP, a low-power radio station (107.9 FM) licensed to serve Oxnard, California, United States
- Waterbury–Oxford Airport (ICAO code KOXC)
