= KMCR =

KMCR may refer to:

- KMCR (FM), a radio station (103.9 FM) licensed to serve Montgomery City, Missouri, United States
- KMCR-LP, a low-power radio station (107.9 FM) licensed to serve Moorpark, California, United States
