= XHNSS-TDT =

Television station in Nogales, Sonora, Mexico

- Nogales, Sonora; Mexico
- Channels: Digital: 31 (UHF); Virtual: 8
- Branding: Más TV

Ownership
- Owner: Mario Gustavo de la Fuente Manríquez
- Sister stations: KCKO

History
- First air date: 1994
- Former channel numbers: 7 (analog and digital virtual, 1994-2016)
- Former affiliations: cadenatres (2010-15)
- Call sign meaning: NogaleS Sonora

Technical information
- Licensing authority: CRT
- ERP: 42.46 kW
- HAAT: 345.2 m (1,133 ft)
- Transmitter coordinates: 31°17′20.7″N 110°59′32.2″W

Links
- Website: Ocho Nogales on Facebook

XHNSS-TDT is a television station on digital channel 31 (virtual channel 8) in Nogales, Sonora. Transmitting from Cerro San Fernando, XHNSS is an independent local station.

== History ==
XHNSS received its concession for analog channel 7 in the early 1990s. It was owned by Raúl Ernesto Osete Espinosa de los Monteros and carried the programming of Galavisión. Eventually, the concession passed to Teleimagen del Noroeste, a Televisa affiliate associated with Grupo Siete Comunicación that owns XHHMA-TV in Hermosillo.

The station was sold to Jaime Juaristi Santos in 2008. Jaime is the son of Francisco Juaristi Santos, whose Grupo Zócalo operates newspapers and broadcast stations throughout the state of Coahuila. In Nogales, Jaime Juaristi Santos also owns the Nuevo Día morning newspaper and KCKO FM radio (the latter through a United States company in which he holds an 18 percent ownership stake). In 2010, XHNSS changed its programming source to cadenatres and ramped up local production; cadenatres was shut down in 2015.

The station began broadcasting in digital in 2013 on physical channel 31, making it the first TV station in Nogales to go digital. In December 2015, the station went digital only.

In 2016, XHNSS moved to channel 8 and rebranded as Ocho Nogales, as a consequence of changes to Mexican virtual channel assignments and the need to vacate channel 7 for the Azteca 7 network. The station, Nuevo Día, and KCKO were sold in separate transactions in 2020 and 2021 to the de la Fuente family.
