= XHTEQ-FM =

Radio station in Tequila, Jalisco

- Tequila, Jalisco; Mexico
- Frequency: 107.9 FM
- Branding: Tequila FM

Ownership
- Owner: Grupo Radiofónico ZER; (Impulsa por el Bien Común de Jalisco, A.C.)

History
- First air date: April 30, 2013 (permit)
- Call sign meaning: TEQuila

Technical information
- Licensing authority: CRT
- Class: A
- ERP: 3 kW
- HAAT: −168 m (−551 ft)

Links
- Website: grupozer.net/radios.php?estacion=19

XHTEQ-FM is a noncommercial radio station on 107.9 FM in Tequila, Jalisco, known as Tequila FM. It is one of two permit stations operated by Grupo Radiofónico ZER via permitholder Impulsa por el Bien Común de Jalisco, A.C.

== History ==
XHTEQ received its permit on April 30, 2013. It broadcasts from the Edificio Mario Talavera.
