= XHTFM-FM =

Indigenous radio station in Mazatlán Villa de Flores, Oaxaca

Mazatlán Villa de Flores, Oaxaca; Mexico
- Frequency: 107.9 FM
- Branding: Radio Nahndiá

Programming
- Format: Community

Ownership
- Owner: Comunidad Mazateca en Mazatlán Villa de Flores, Teotitlán de Flores Magón, Oaxaca (Mie Nillu Mazateco, A.C.)

History
- First air date: December 22, 2004 (permit)
- Call sign meaning: Teotitlán de Flores Magón

Technical information
- Class: A
- ERP: 0.37 kW
- HAAT: 39.2 m
- Transmitter coordinates: 18°02′01″N 96°53′47″W

Links
- Website: www.radionandia.org.mx

XHTFM-FM is a community radio station on 107.9 FM in Mazatlán Villa de Flores, Oaxaca. It is known as Radio Nahndiá.

== History ==
On December 22, 2004, XHTFM-FM 107.9 was permitted. The station was transitioned to an indigenous concession in 2016.
