= WEUC =

- Morganfield, Kentucky; United States
- Broadcast area: Morganfield
- Frequency: 88.7 MHz

Programming
- Format: EWTN's Ave Maria Radio: Religious, Catholic sermons, call-in
- Affiliations: Catholic

Ownership
- Owner: Saint Ann Radio Group, Inc.

History
- First air date: June 23, 2008
- Call sign meaning: Eucharist

Technical information
- Licensing authority: FCC
- Facility ID: 122810
- Class: A
- ERP: 35,000 watts
- HAAT: 795.0 meters (2,608.3 ft)
- Transmitter coordinates: 37°44′9″N 87°59′45″W

Links
- Public license information: Public file; LMS

WEUC (88.7 FM) is a radio station broadcasting the EWTN network's Ave Maria Radio. Licensed to Morganfield, Kentucky, United States, the station serves Morganfield and surrounding areas. The station also comes in around Evansville, Indiana, though the signal there is weak.

"WEUC" used to be the call letters of Emisora Universidad Católica (English: Catholic University Broadcasting), the radio station broadcasting of the Catholic University of Puerto Rico, in Ponce, Puerto Rico until the university changed its name in 1991 after Pope John Paul II bestowed on the university the title of pontifical. The PUCPR's radio station call letters were subsequently changed to "WPUC" (Pontificia Universidad Católica [English: Pontifical Catholic University]) in order to reflect the university's new name.

== See also ==
- WSGJ-LP: Catholic radio station in Bowling Green, Kentucky
