= Bev Sanders =

Bev Sanders is a snowboarder, surfer, and founder of Manifesta Safaris, a women's travel and adventure company based in Carmel-by-the-Sea, CA. The company's holdings includes Las Olas Surf Safaris, the first surf camp for women, and Jennifer's Journey, a women's travel website.

Born Beverly Farrell near Greenfield, Massachusetts in 1953, Sanders became a ski instructor at the age of 16 at Mohawk Mountain Ski Area in Shelburne, MA.

In 1982, Sanders co-founded Avalanche Snowboards with her husband, Chris Sanders, in Lake Tahoe, CA. She inspired "Sanders Design 148", a snowboard designed for women. The design won Snowboard Magazine's award for best free-riding board and initiated higher standards for female-specific snowboard equipment. Avalanche Snowboards was sold in 1994 to businessman Robert Edwards. Sanders stayed on as director of marketing until 1996.

From 1982–1988, Sanders campaigned for the acceptance of snowboards at U.S. ski resorts.

In 1995, Transworld Snowboarding recognized Sanders' contributions to women in the sport, honoring her as a Pioneer Woman of Snowboarding.

In 1997, Sanders was taught to surf by professional surfer Nancy Emerson and started Las Olas Surf Safaris, the first all-inclusive surf vacation for women.

In 1998, Sanders purchased a General Motors EV-1. A proponent of sustainable transportation, Sanders wrote an article entitled "Don’t unplug the electric car" for the San Francisco Chronicle in 2003.

In 2005, Sanders started Artista Creative Safaris, an encaustic and acrylic painting vacation for women. Sanders launched Jennifer's Journey, a women's travel website, in honor of her sister, Jennifer Maher, who died from cancer in 2007.

== Personal life ==
Sanders married Chris Sanders, co-founder of Avalanche Snowboards, in 1985. She lives in Carmel-by-the-Sea, CA.
