= XHRHI-FM =

Radio station in Uruapan, Michoacán

- Uruapan, Michoacán; Mexico
- Frequency: 107.9 MHz
- Branding: Radio Uandárhi

Programming
- Format: Noncommercial community radio

Ownership
- Owner: Uandarhi, A.C.

History
- First air date: 2004
- Call sign meaning: UandáRHI

Technical information
- Class: A
- ERP: 3 kW
- HAAT: -161.4 meters
- Transmitter coordinates: 19°25′37.2″N 102°03′44.6″W

Links
- Website: radiouandarhi.blogspot.com

XHRHI-FM is a community radio station in Uruapan, Michoacán, broadcasting on 107.9 FM. XHRHI is owned by Uandárhi, A.C., and is a member of AMARC México.

== History ==
The station takes its name from the Purépecha word uandárhi, which means "communication agents".

XHRHI came to air after receiving its permit in December 2004. In 2019, the station was approved to increase power to 3,000 watts.
