= St. Joseph's Catholic Church (Bowling Green, Kentucky) =

Historic church in Kentucky, United States

- St. Joseph Roman Catholic Church
- U.S. National Register of Historic Places
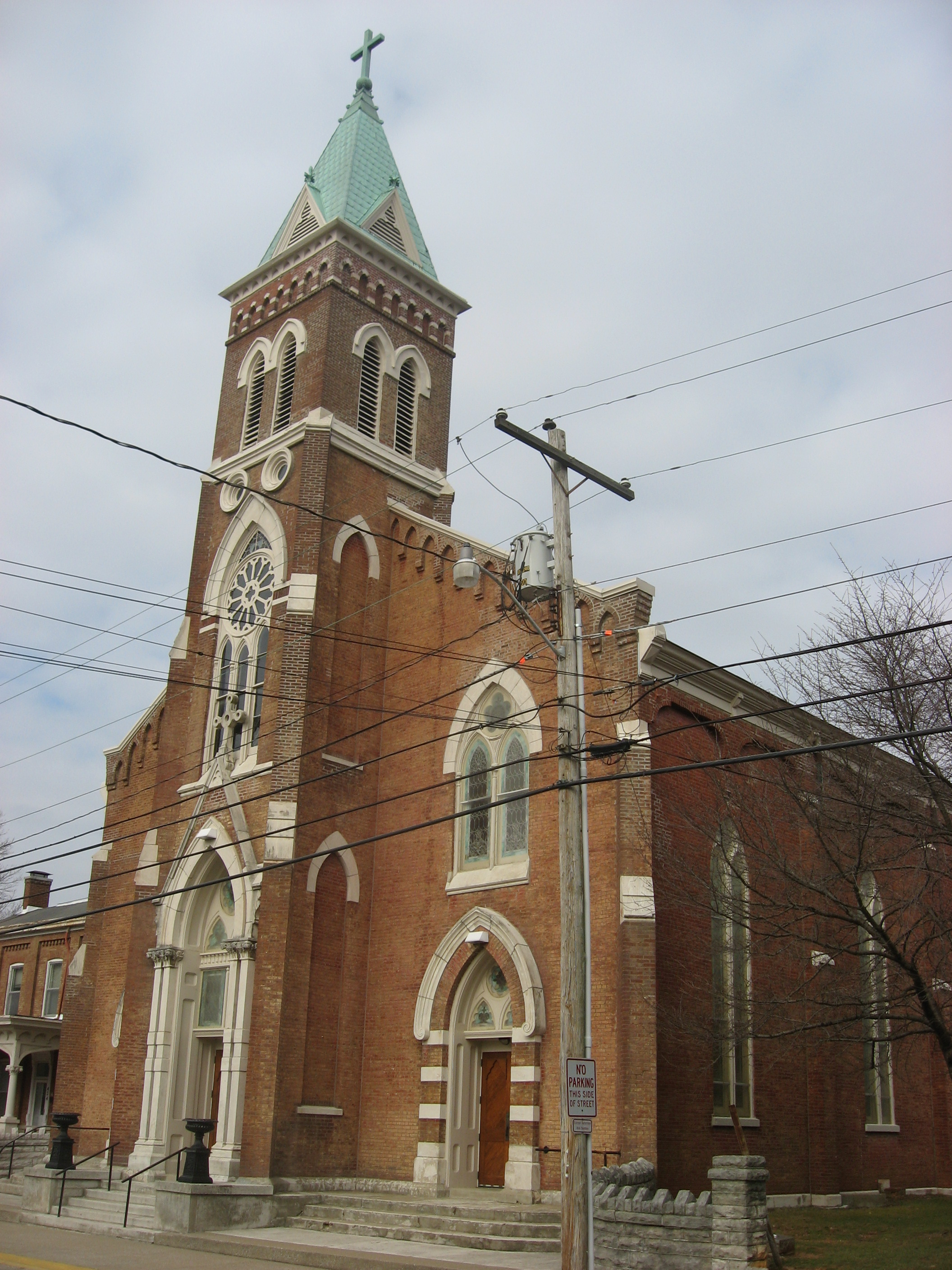
- Front and southern side

- Location within Kentucky Location within the United States
- Location: 434 Church St., Bowling Green, Kentucky
- Coordinates: 37°0′6″N 86°26′49″W
- Area: less than one acre
- Built: 1859
- Architect: Kister, Frank Sr.; Kister, Frank Jr.
- Architectural style: Gothic, Italianate, High Victorian Gothic
- NRHP reference No.: 75000840
- Added to NRHP: July 3, 1975

The St. Joseph Roman Catholic Church in Bowling Green, Kentucky, is a historic church at 434 Church Street. It was built in 1859 and added to the National Register in 1975. It has also been known as St. Joseph's Church. It was added to the National Register because it possesses exceptional interest for its history and architecture.

== Foundations (1853–1888) ==
In 1853, Louisville Bishop John Martin Spalding requested the twenty-two-year-old seminarian, Father Joseph DeVries, to continue the evergrowing mission. Father DeVries and eight other missionaries were ordained in 1855. The Church began its foundations in 1859 when a small frame building was constructed for a school of boys but was used for Mass on Sundays. The Church's deed stated that the Church is designated for the Catholic people of Warren County. Francis Leopold Kister, a master German architect began designing and building the structure. The walls were not yet plastered when the first Easter Sunday Mass was held. The Church was completed in 1889 because the Civil War created interruption to the building process. The bell for the church weighing six-hundred pounds, was cast in Troy, New York. Once brought to Kentucky, it was blessed in 1863 and is still in use today. The steeple is 142 feet tall and the highest in the city at the time.

== Early days (1889-1930) ==
The second pastor, Father Thomas J. Hayes on August 10, 1889, because of the unexpected death of Father DeVries. Father DeVries was buried under the main altar of the Church marked by a marble slab on the sanctuary walls. On Easter Sunday in 1902, the church was badly damaged in a fire. This led to the leaders of the church deciding to decorate the interior of the church with fresco paintings, originally done by Charles and Guido Leber (artists from Louisville, Kentucky). In 1903, additions to the exterior of the church were added. A small stoop was added to the rectory and the church's walls were extended to the street. In August 1912, it was decided that St. Joseph's Catholic Church should open a school. The School and the convent for the Sisters of Charity of Nazareth was built right next to the church. The Sisters of Charity of Nazareth staffed the school for 55 years and the school remained open until 1965 with eight grades.

=== World War I ===
During the years of World War I, St. Joseph's Parish was active in contributing aid by selling handmade paper carnations made by the disabled veterans for about 25 cents each (red if the mother was living and white if the mother was deceased) In 1923, the steeple was destroyed by a cyclone and replaced by the current pyramidal structure which rises to about 87 feet (27 m). This same year the church's street was paved.

== The Depression, World War II, and the 50s (1930-1965) ==
In 1931, columns were added floor to ceiling and finished with faux marble. However, it was not until 1937 that the interior was redecorated. Father Raymond G. Hill conducted a drive to fund the Leber family to redecorate the interior of the church after 34 years. At this same time, new Gothic lanterns replaced existing chandelier light fixtures. "Pew rent" was also introduced that year which was a way for parishioners to pay for their families to have a special seat for Sunday Mass. In the late 50s, Knights of Columbus celebrated their 50th anniversary at St. Josephs Catholic Church. Later that next year in 1959, St. Joseph's parish celebrated its 100th anniversary with a banquet at a local restaurant called Old Fort Restaurant. The Centennial Mass took place on December 7, 1959. However, before the mass Fr. Bowling had the same artist come back and redecorate the interior 21 years after the 1937 redecoration. The majority of the original frescos were painted out because of finances and a new rubber tile floor was installed.

== Late Twentieth Century (1966-1990) ==
Reverend Charles P. Bowling retired in March 1971 after 24 years of service. Father Richard Powers stepped in to fill the position with a music and welcome party. When the parish sent in information to the National Register of Historic Places, it was noted that the original organ from 1898 was still intact. The grand organ has 18 ranked pipes and encases of white quarter oak.

== Present Day (Early Twenty-first Century) ==
St. Joseph sees a generous attendance for Mass on Sundays. Wednesday Mass is also given for the small Catholic school that is attached to it.

== See also ==
- WSGJ-LP: Radio station run by the church
