= WUAF-LP =

Radio station in Lake City, Florida

- Lake City, Florida; United States
- Frequency: 107.9 MHz
- Branding: Angel 107.9

Programming
- Format: Gospel

Ownership
- Owner: Angel Ministries of Lake City Inc.

History
- Former call signs: WDSE-LP (2002–2004); WMJB-LP (2004–2012)

Technical information
- Licensing authority: FCC
- Class: L1
- ERP: 100 watts
- HAAT: 22 meters (72 ft)
- Transmitter coordinates: 30°09′48.00″N 82°38′18.00″W

Links
- Public license information: LMS
- Webcast: Listen live
- Website: WUAF-LP online

WUAF-LP (107.9 FM) is a gospel music formatted radio station primarily serving the Lake City, Florida, area, owned by Angel Ministries of Lake City Inc.
