= XHRCV-FM =

Community radio station in San Antonino Castillo Velasco, Oaxaca

San Antonio Castillo Velasco, Oaxaca; Mexico
- Frequency: 107.9 FM
- Branding: Radio Calenda, La Voz del Valle

Programming
- Format: Community

Ownership
- Owner: Radio Calenda La Voz del Valle, A.C.

History
- First air date: September 15, 2001; April 22, 2005 (permit)
- Call sign meaning: Radio Calenda La Voz del Valle

Technical information
- ERP: 1.09 kW
- Transmitter coordinates: 16°48′15″N 96°41′03″W

Links
- Webcast: radiocalendalavozdelvalle.blogspot.com

XHRCV-FM is a community radio station on 107.9 FM in San Antonino Castillo Velasco, Oaxaca. It is known as Radio Calenda, La Voz del Valle.

== History ==
With roots dating back to 1997, Radio Calenda signed on the air on 104.5 MHz on September 15, 2001. On April 22, 2005, XHRCV-FM 107.9 was permitted.
