= KCKO =

Radio station in Rio Rico, Arizona, United States

- Rio Rico, Arizona; United States
- Broadcast area: Nogales, Arizona; Nogales, Sonora
- Frequency: 107.9 MHz
- Branding: Más Radio

Programming
- Languages: English and Spanish
- Format: Adult contemporary

Ownership
- Owner: De La Fuente Media, LLC
- Sister stations: XHNSS-TDT

Technical information
- Licensing authority: FCC
- Facility ID: 171003
- Class: A
- ERP: 1,800 watts
- HAAT: 150.2 meters (493 ft)
- Transmitter coordinates: 31°23′42″N 110°55′25″W

Links
- Public license information: Public file; LMS
- Website: masfm.com.mx

KCKO (107.9 FM) is a commercial radio station licensed to Rio Rico, Arizona, United States. The station is owned by De la Fuente Media, LLC.

== History ==
KCKO received its construction permit in 2010. It was owned by Ted Tucker by way of Skywest Media and later Cochise Media Licenses.

In 2012, KCKO, still unbuilt, was sold to JJS Media, LLC, a corporation 18% owned by Jaime Juaristi Santos, the Mexican owner of XHNSS-TDT television in Nogales, Sonora, as well as the Nuevo Día newspaper.

Effective December 2, 2020, JJS Media sold KCKO to De la Fuente Media, LLC for $700,030, which changed it from romantic "Amor 107.9" to its present format. In 2021, one of the principals of De la Fuente Media, Mario Gustavo de la Fuente Manríquez, was approved to become the concessionaire of XHNSS.
