= Greenfield, Massachusetts =

Greenfield
- City
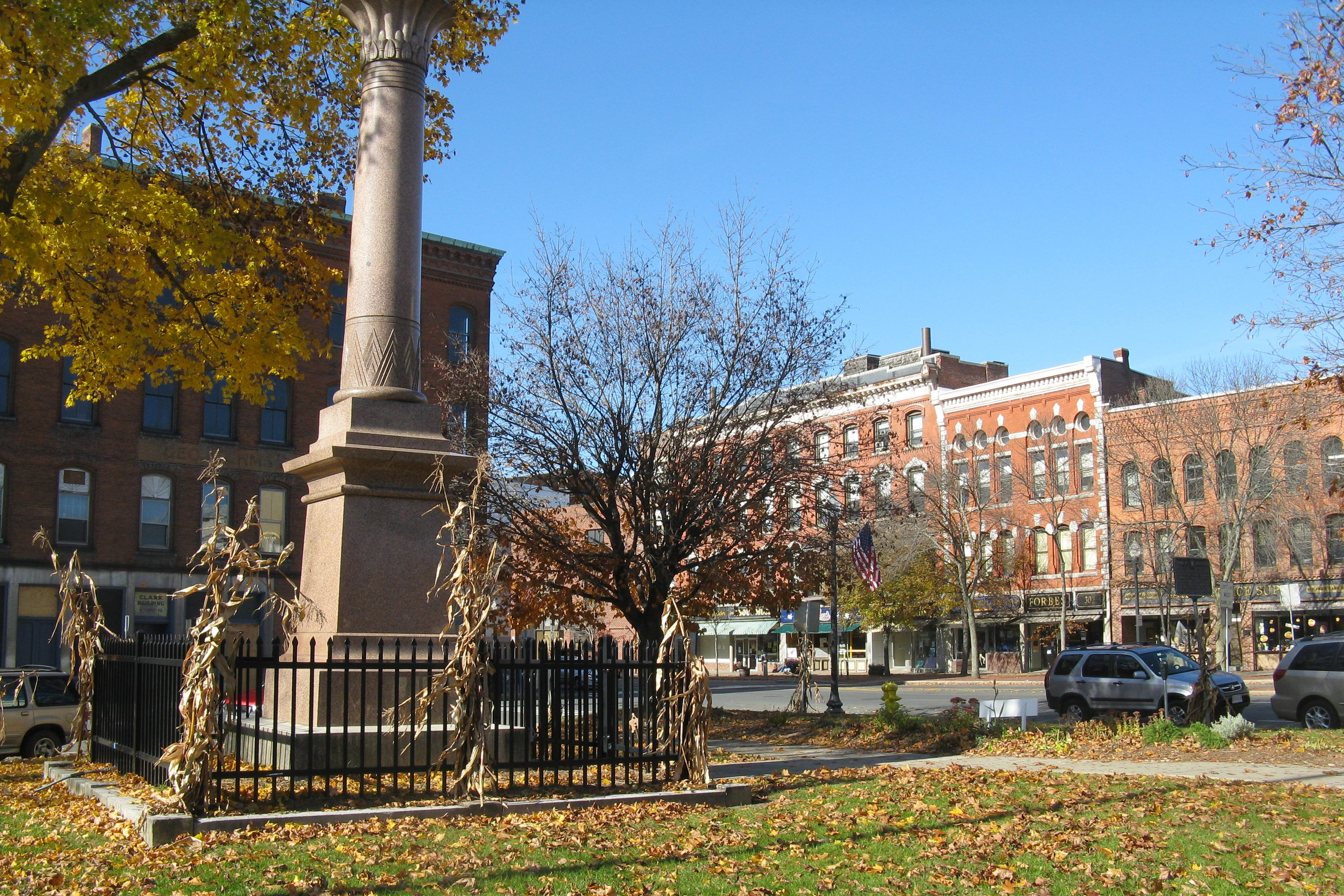
- The Civil War Memorial on Court Square

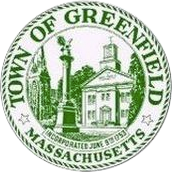
- Flag Seal

- Location in Franklin County in Massachusetts

- Location in the United States
- Coordinates: 42°35′15″N 72°36′00″W
- Country: United States
- State: Massachusetts
- County: Franklin
- Settled: 1686
- Incorporated: 1753

Government
  - Type: Mayor–council city
  - Mayor: Ginny Desorgher

Area
  - Total: 21.87 sq mi (56.65 km^{2})
  - Land: 21.41 sq mi (55.46 km^{2})
  - Water: 0.46 sq mi (1.19 km^{2})
- Elevation: 302 ft (92 m)

Population (2020)
  - Total: 17,768
  - Density: 829.8/sq mi (320.39/km^{2})
- Time zone: UTC−5 (Eastern)
  - Summer (DST): UTC−4 (Eastern)
- ZIP Code: 01301
- Area code: 413
- FIPS code: 25-27060
- GNIS feature ID: 0618166
- Website: greenfield-ma.gov

Greenfield is the county seat and sole city of Franklin County, Massachusetts, United States. Greenfield was first settled in 1686. The population was 17,768 at the 2020 census. Greenfield is home to Greenfield Community College, the Pioneer Valley Symphony Orchestra, the Franklin County Fair, and the Green River Festival. The city has a Main Street Historic District containing fine examples of Federal, Greek Revival, and Victorian architecture.

Greenfield anchors the Greenfield Town, MA Micropolitan Statistical Area, which is included in the Springfield-Greenfield Town, MA Combined Statistical Area.

== History ==
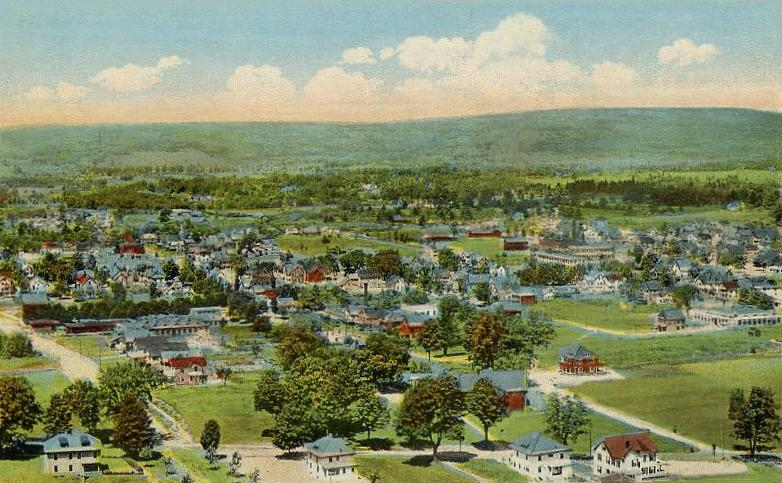
Greenfield from Poet's Seat Tower, 1917

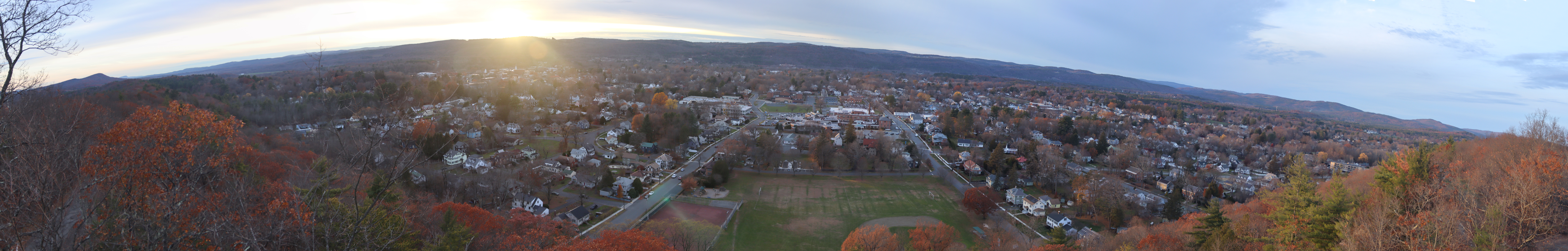
The same view in November 2025

The Pocumtuck nation (an Indigenous American tribe) first settled and originally inhabited the Greenfield area. Native American artifacts found in the area have been dated between 7,000 and 9,000 BCE. The Pocumtucks planted field crops and fished local rivers. Some sources claim that they were wiped out by the Mohawks in 1664 and that the land was left unoccupied. Other sources show that the Pocumtucks joined the Wampanoag chief Metacom in August 1675 in the fight against English encroachment, indicating a continued presence in the area. The Pocumtuck also played an important role in the Battle of Turner's Falls on May 19, 1676, and tribal oral tradition indicates that following the battle, elements of the Pocumtuck fled to and were incorporated into the Abenaki people to the north and the Mahican people to the west.

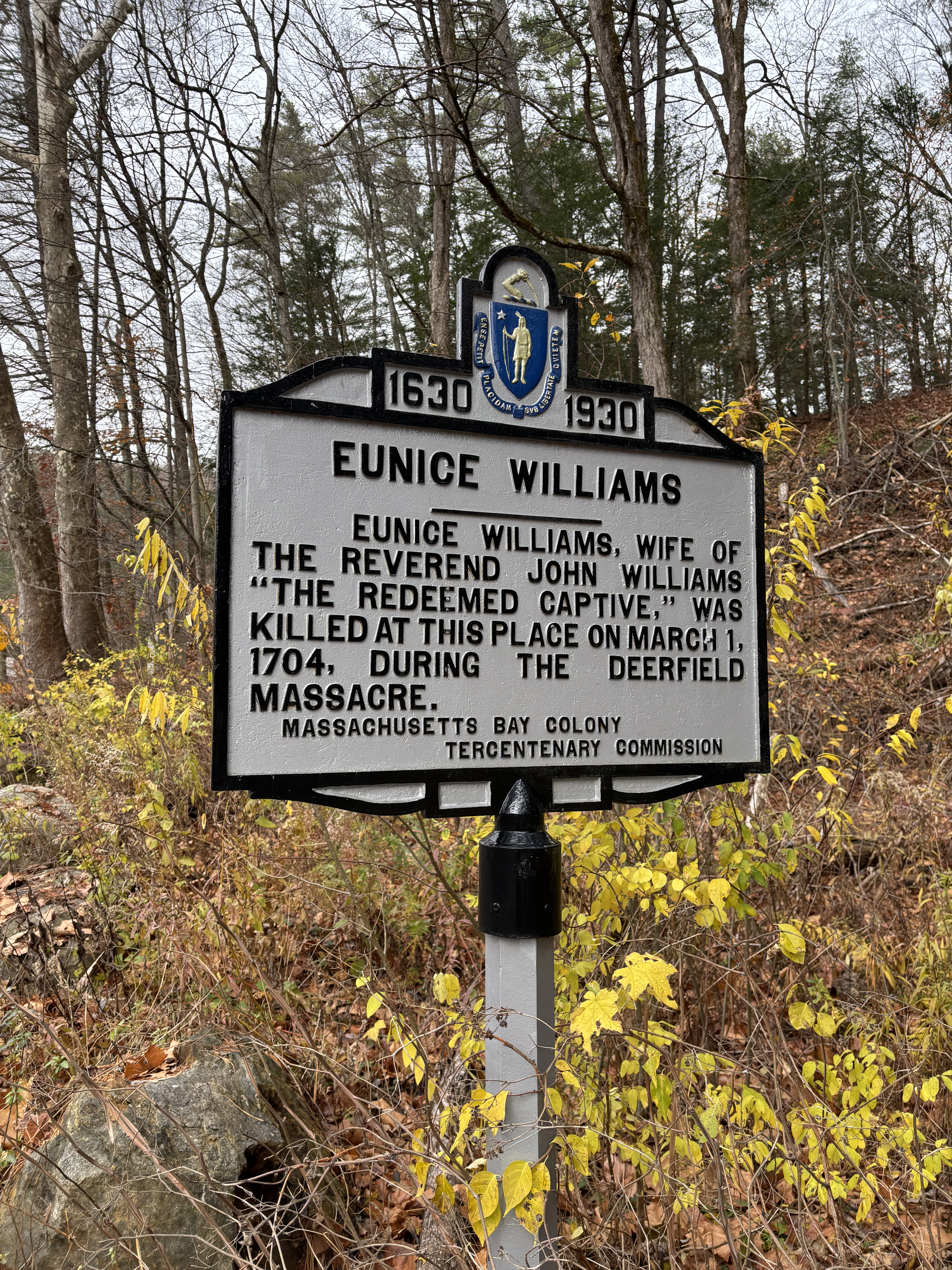
Eunice Williams

The area was colonized as part of Deerfield by the English in 1686. In 1753, Greenfield, named for the Green River, was incorporated as a separate town from Deerfield.

In 1795, the South Hadley Canal opened, enabling boats to bypass the South Hadley falls and reach Greenfield via the Connecticut River. Located at the confluence of the Deerfield and Green rivers, and not far from where they merge into the Connecticut River, Greenfield developed into a trade center. Falls provided water power for industry, and Greenfield grew into a prosperous mill town. John Russell established the Green River Works in 1834, hiring skilled German workers at what was the country's first cutlery factory. The Connecticut River Railroad was the first of several railways to enter the town, replacing the former canal trade. During the 19th and 20th centuries, Greenfield was one of the most important American centers of the tap and die business and was the home of Greenfield Tap & Die Company (GTD).

It was designated the county seat when Franklin County was created from Hampshire County in 1811.

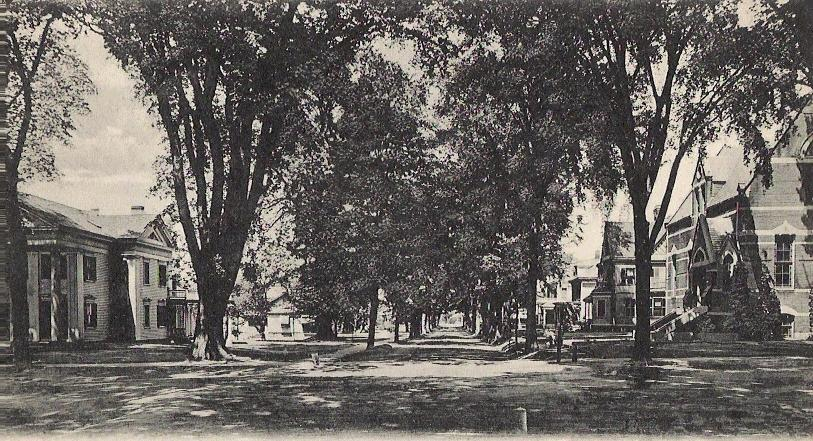
Franklin Street in 1906

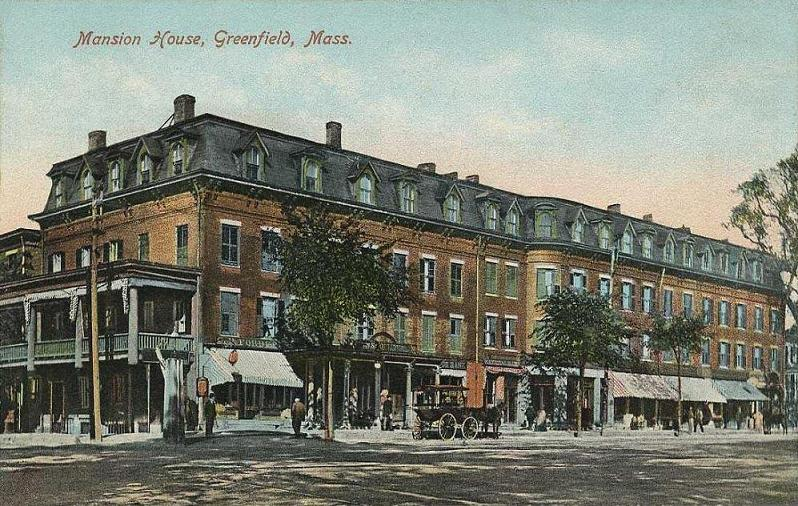
Mansion House c. 1908

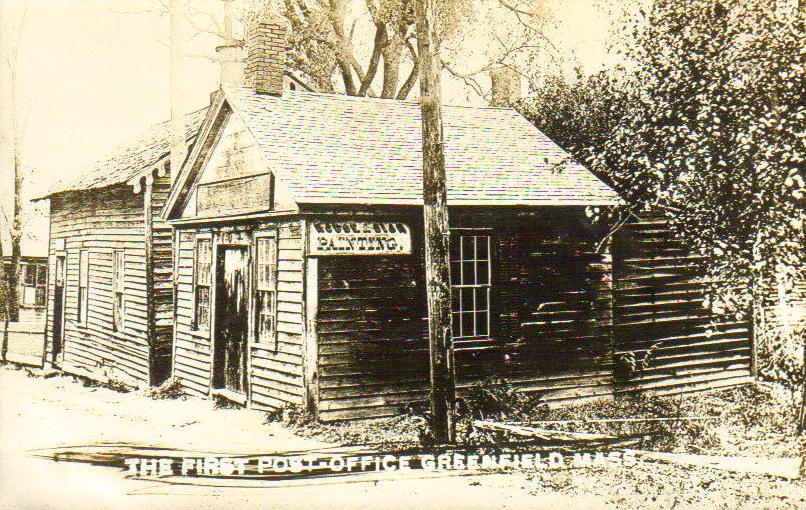
The first post office c. 1910

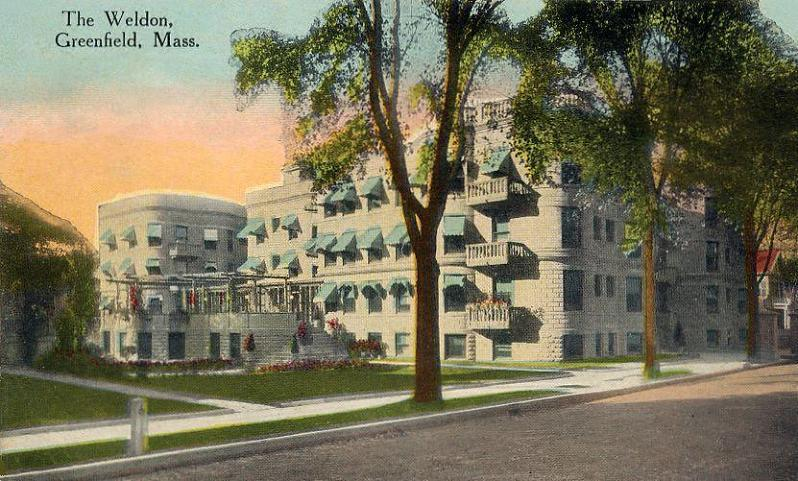
The Weldon Hotel in 1913

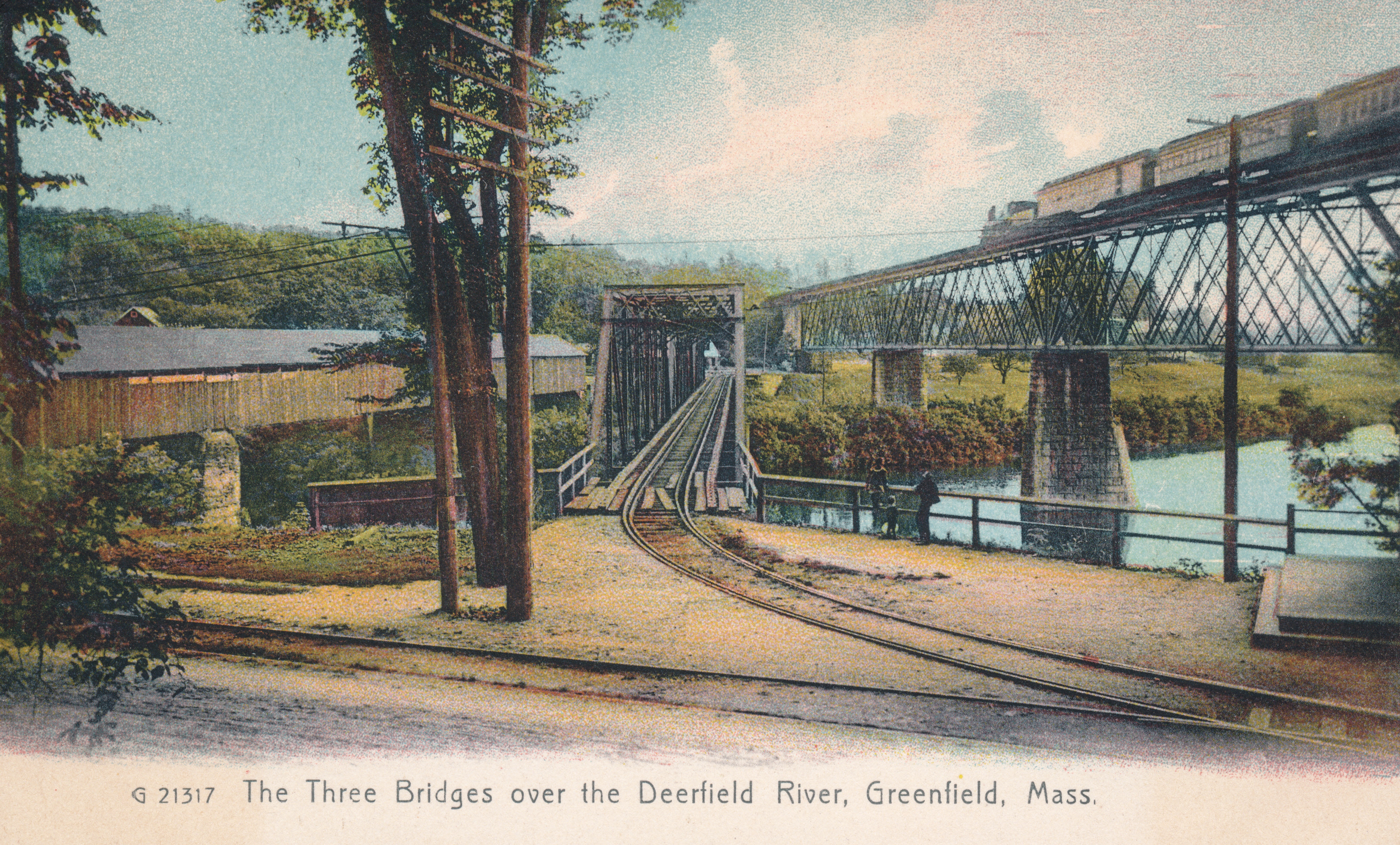
Early bridges over the Deerfield River c. 1915

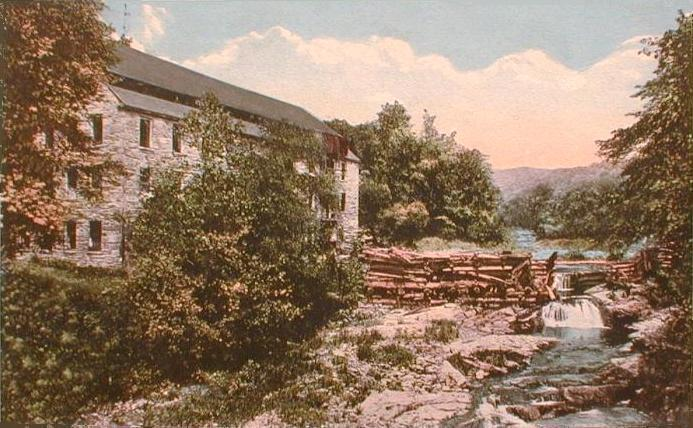
Old Stone Mill c. 1920

== Geography ==
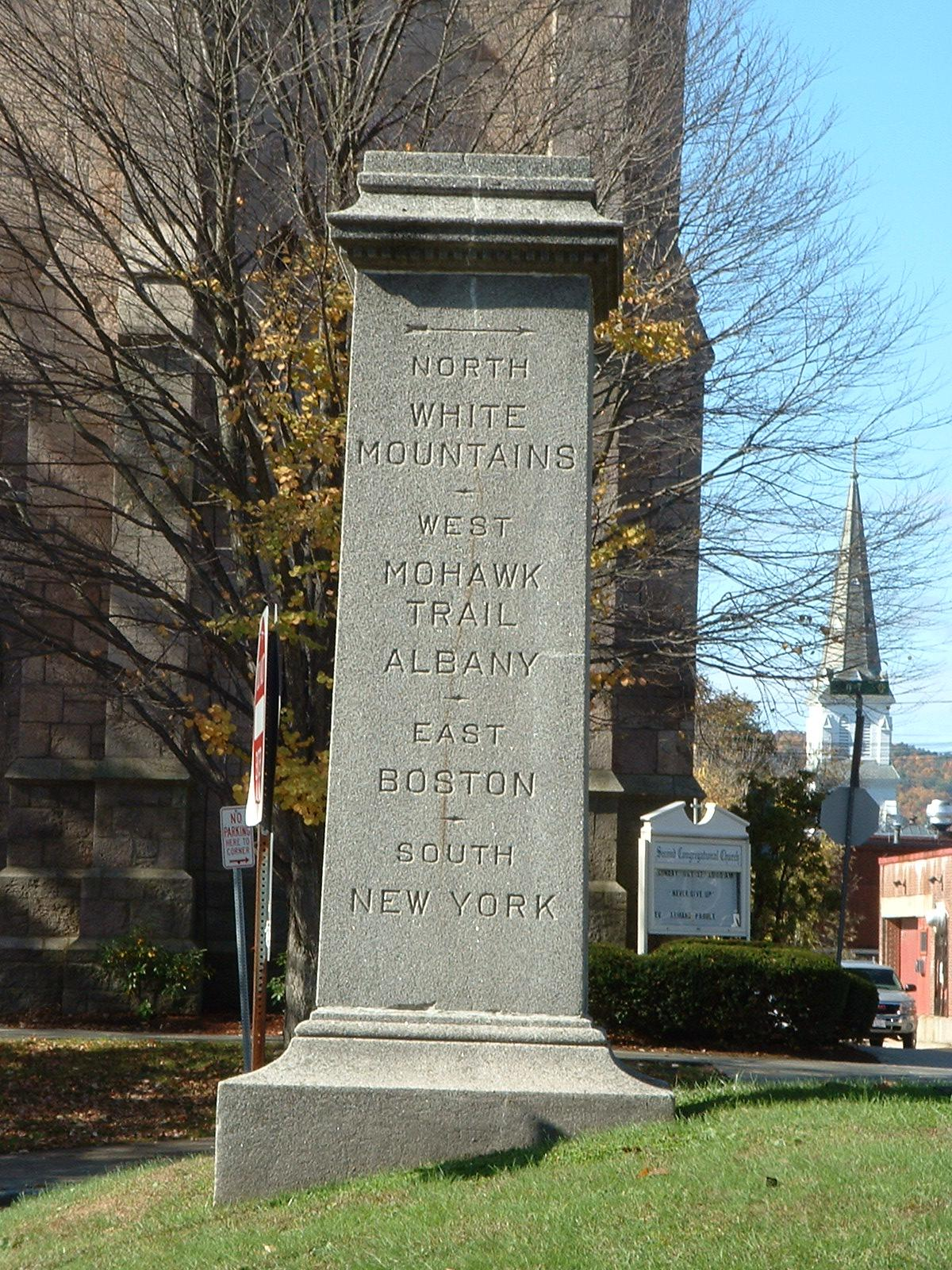
The road marker on the Common

According to the United States Census Bureau, the town has a total area of 22 square miles (56.7 km^{2}), of which 21 square miles (55.5 km^{2}) is land and 0.5 square miles (1.2 km^{2}), or 2.08%, is water. Greenfield is located at the center of the county and is bordered by Colrain, Leyden, and Bernardston to the north; Gill to the east; Montague to the southeast; Deerfield to the south; and Shelburne to the west. Greenfield is located 39 miles (63 km) north of Springfield and 90 miles (145 km) west-northwest of Boston.

Greenfield lies at the confluence of the Deerfield, Green, and Connecticut rivers. The Green River runs from the north, through town to the Deerfield, which lies along the city's southern border. From there, the Deerfield meets the Connecticut, which flows southward along the Montague border before bending eastward briefly before continuing southward. Several brooks flow into the three rivers, as well as a fourth river, the Fall River, which makes up the city's border with Gill. The city is located beside the Pocumtuck Range, the northernmost subridge of the Metacomet Ridge, and is surrounded by hills, with the town center lying on an elevated point above the rivers.

=== Climate ===
Like most of New England, Greenfield has a humid continental climate, exactly on the border between Köppen Dfa and Dfb with its warmest-month (July) mean of 71.6 °F (22.0 °C), with cold, snowy winters and warm, humid summers. Extreme temperatures range from 100 °F (37.8 °C), recorded on July 22, 1926, and August 26, 1948, to −30 °F (−34.4 °C), recorded on January 22, 1961. Precipitation is abundant and well distributed (every month except February receives over three inches) and averages 41.3 inches (1,050 mm) per year.

Climate data for Greenfield, Massachusetts
Month	Jan	Feb	Mar	Apr	May	Jun	Jul	Aug	Sep	Oct	Nov	Dec	Year
Mean daily maximum °F (°C)	32.7 (0.4)	34.5 (1.4)	44.2 (6.8)	57.3 (14.1)	70.0 (21.1)	78.4 (25.8)	83.0 (28.3)	80.6 (27.0)	73.2 (22.9)	62.2 (16.8)	48.3 (9.1)	35.7 (2.1)	58.3 (14.6)
Mean daily minimum °F (°C)	14.0 (−10.0)	14.5 (−9.7)	25.0 (−3.9)	35.2 (1.8)	45.8 (7.7)	55.1 (12.8)	60.2 (15.7)	58.2 (14.6)	50.8 (10.4)	40.1 (4.5)	30.7 (−0.7)	18.9 (−7.3)	37.4 (3.0)
Average precipitation inches (mm)	3.2 (81)	2.8 (71)	3.5 (89)	3.4 (86)	3.6 (91)	3.7 (94)	3.7 (94)	3.8 (97)	3.6 (91)	3.0 (76)	3.6 (91)	3.5 (89)	41.3 (1,050)
Average snowfall inches (cm)	15.3 (39)	15.1 (38)	8.8 (22)	2.0 (5.1)	0 (0)	0 (0)	0 (0)	0 (0)	0 (0)	0 (0)	2.3 (5.8)	9.5 (24)	53.0 (135)
Average precipitation days	10	9	10	10	10	10	10	9	8	8	9	10	113
Source: Weatherbase

== Demographics ==
Historical population
Year	Pop.	±%
1790	1,498	—
1850	2,580	+72.2%
1860	3,198	+24.0%
1870	3,589	+12.2%
1880	3,903	+8.7%
1890	5,252	+34.6%
1900	7,927	+50.9%
1910	10,427	+31.5%
1920	15,462	+48.3%
1930	15,500	+0.2%
1940	15,672	+1.1%
1950	17,349	+10.7%
1960	17,690	+2.0%
1970	18,116	+2.4%
1980	18,436	+1.8%
1990	18,666	+1.2%
2000	18,168	−2.7%
2010	17,456	−3.9%
2020	17,768	+1.8%
2024*	17,633	−0.8%
* = population estimate. Source: United States census records and Population Estimates Program data. Source: U.S. Decennial Census

=== 2020 census ===
As of the 2020 census, Greenfield had a population of 17,768. The median age was 44.6 years. 17.6% of residents were under the age of 18 and 22.3% of residents were 65 years of age or older. For every 100 females there were 92.6 males, and for every 100 females age 18 and over there were 88.7 males age 18 and over.

86.2% of residents lived in urban areas, while 13.8% lived in rural areas.

There were 8,116 households in Greenfield, of which 21.6% had children under the age of 18 living in them. Of all households, 33.7% were married-couple households, 23.0% were households with a male householder and no spouse or partner present, and 35.1% were households with a female householder and no spouse or partner present. About 41.0% of all households were made up of individuals and 18.0% had someone living alone who was 65 years of age or older.

There were 8,646 housing units, of which 6.1% were vacant. The homeowner vacancy rate was 1.1% and the rental vacancy rate was 4.6%.

Racial composition as of the 2020 census
Race	Number	Percent
White	15,054	84.7%
Black or African American	440	2.5%
American Indian and Alaska Native	46	0.3%
Asian	290	1.6%
Native Hawaiian and Other Pacific Islander	4	0.0%
Some other race	534	3.0%
Two or more races	1,400	7.9%
Hispanic or Latino (of any race)	1,468	8.3%

=== 2010 census ===
By the 2010 census, the population had decreased to 17,456. Greenfield, as the only community in the county with a population over 10,000, is the largest community by population or population density in the county. It is also the smallest mainland county seat in the Commonwealth, as only the island towns of Edgartown and Nantucket are smaller.

=== 2000 census ===
As of the census of 2000, there had been 18,168 people, 7,939 households, and 4,374 families residing in the city. The population density was 836.2 inhabitants per square mile (322.9/km^{2}). There were 8,301 housing units at an average density of 382.1 per square mile (147.5/km^{2}). The racial makeup of the city was 93.39% White, 1.34% Black or African American, 0.32% Native American, 1.10% Asian, 0.02% Pacific Islander, 1.41% from other races, and 2.43% from two or more races. Hispanic or Latino of any race were 3.54% of the population.

There were 7,939 households, out of which 26.1% had children under the age of 18 living with them, 38.6% were married couples living together, 12.7% had a female householder with no husband present, and 44.9% were non-families. 36.9% of all households were made up of individuals, and 13.6% had someone living alone who was 65 years of age or older. The average household size was 2.19 and the average family size was 2.88.

In the town the population was spread out, with 21.9% under the age of 18, 8.4% from 18 to 24, 28.7% from 25 to 44, 23.5% from 45 to 64, and 17.5% who were 65 years of age or older. The median age was 40 years. For every 100 females, there were 88.9 males. For every 100 females age 18 and over, there were 85.4 males.

The median income for a household in the town was $33,110, and the median income for a family was $46,412. Males had a median income of $33,903 versus $26,427 for females. The per capita income for the town was $18,830. About 11.4% of families and 14.0% of the population were below the poverty line, including 19.2% of those under age 18 and 11.1% of those age 65 or over.

== Government ==
Greenfield was one of several Massachusetts municipalities that applied for, and were granted, city forms of government but wished to retain "The Town of" in their official names. In December 2017, the Town Council voted to remove "The Town of" designation, making Greenfield known as the City of Greenfield. Since the charter change in 2003 Greenfield has been governed by a town council and a mayor. The former town council is now called the city council and consists of four at-large councilors and nine councilors that are each elected from one of the city's nine electoral precincts. The other city boards are appointed, with the exception of the seven-member school committee, which consists of the mayor plus six members elected at-large.

Voter Registration and Party Enrollment as of October 15, 2008
Party	Number of Voters	Percentage
Independent	6,335	54.96%
Democratic	3,831	33.24%
Republican	1,243	10.78%
Libertarian	117	1.02%
Total	11,526	100%

=== Mayor ===
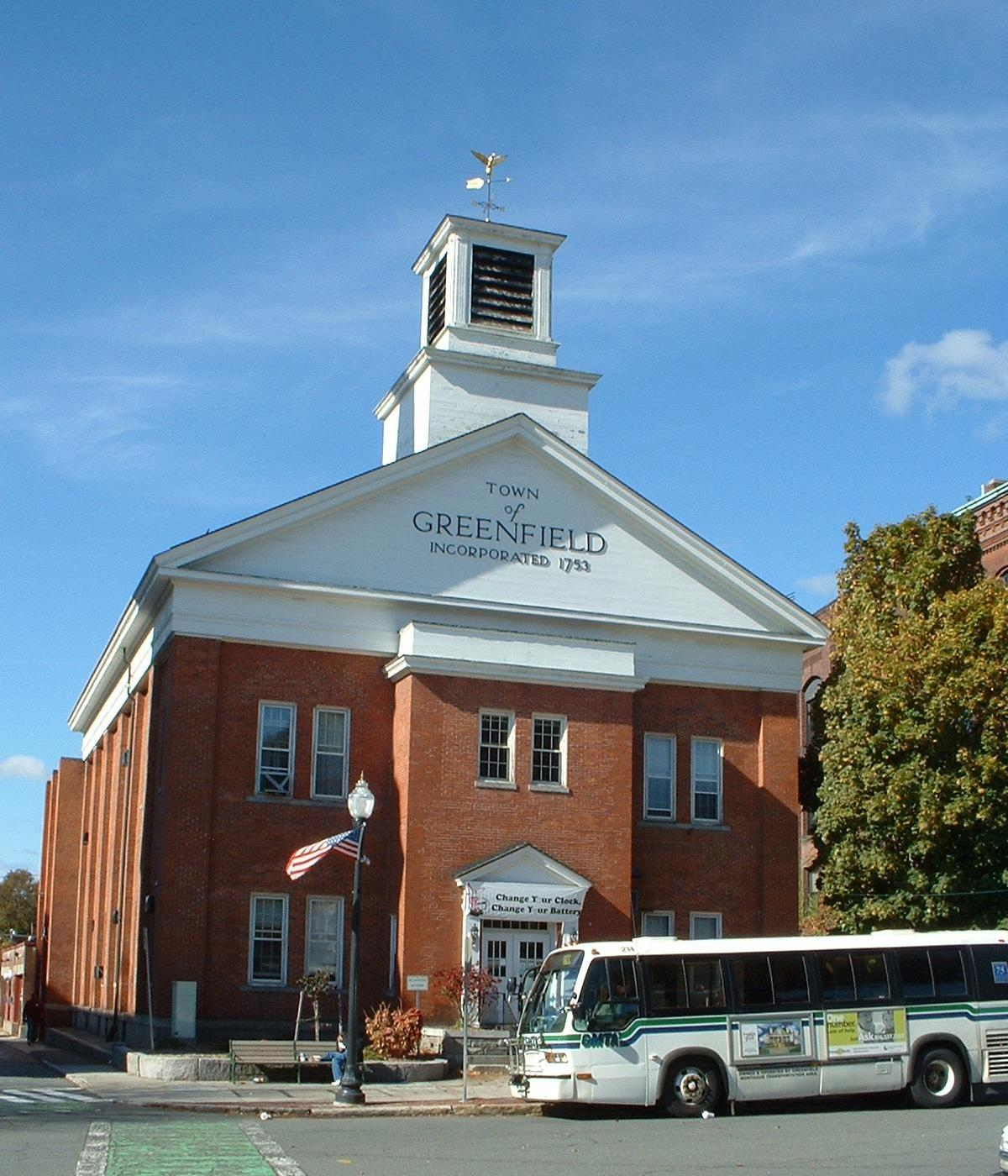
Greenfield City Hall

Greenfield's first mayor, Christine Forgey, served until 2009 when she was defeated in a primary election. Greenfield's second mayor, Bill Martin, took second place in the 2009 primary as a write-in candidate and went on to win the general election in June. Martin's tenure began with a formal inauguration ceremony, the city's first, which also featured a mayoral fanfare, Long Live Our Mayor, written for the occasion in the style of Hail to the Chief. At the inauguration, Martin read a proclamation declaring July 1 as "Inauguration Day" in all following years. After Martin's retirement in 2019, Roxann Wedegartner became Greenfield's third mayor. Virginia "Ginny" Desorgher was sworn in as mayor on January 2, 2024.

In Greenfield, the Mayor appoints most of the members of the various city boards, with the city council approving appointments. The mayor also serves as a voting member of the school committee, but is forbidden to serve as its chairman or vice-chair. In addition, the mayor sits as an ex officio non-voting member on all the other city boards.

=== City Council ===
The City Council consists of 13 members: four "Councilors at Large" and nine "Precinct Councilors" elected to represent each of the nine voting precincts. As of 2025, Lora Wondolowski is the Council President, and John Garrett is the Vice-President.

=== Municipal services ===
Greenfield operates its own police and fire departments. The town is also patrolled by the Second (Shelburne Falls) Barracks of Troop "B" of the Massachusetts State Police. It runs a sizeable public works department and is the home base of the regional waste management system. The Greenfield Public Library had many years in the historic Leavitt–Hovey House built in 1797, but recently moved next door to a brand new building. The new library opened on July 13, 2023. Greenfield also operates numerous municipal parks and recreation areas including a town swimming area on the Green River.

=== County seat ===
As county seat, Greenfield is home to many different state offices, including courthouses and one of the offices of the Northwest District Attorney, Dave Sullivan. The Franklin County Sheriff is based in Greenfield and operates the Franklin County Jail at the corner of Elm and Allen streets. The city also has the central post office for the "013" series of ZIP Codes, which extends through Franklin County and several towns in Worcester County. Greenfield is home to the privately run Baystate Franklin Medical Center, which serves much of the northern Pioneer Valley.

=== Legislative delegation ===
Greenfield is divided between the First Franklin and Second Franklin districts of the Massachusetts House of Representatives. Democrat Natalie Blais and Independent Susannah Whipps are the State Representatives. In the Massachusetts Senate, the town is part of the Hampshire and Franklin district, which includes much of eastern Franklin and Hampshire counties. State Senator Jo Comerford represents this district. Greenfield is part of the Eighth Massachusetts Governor's Council district, represented by Tara Jacobs.

Nationally, Greenfield is represented in the United States House of Representatives as part of Massachusetts's 2nd congressional district, and is represented in the 119th United States Congress by James McGovern.

As of 2026, Massachusetts is represented in the United States Senate by Senators Elizabeth Warren and Ed Markey.

== Culture ==
=== The Bee Connection ===
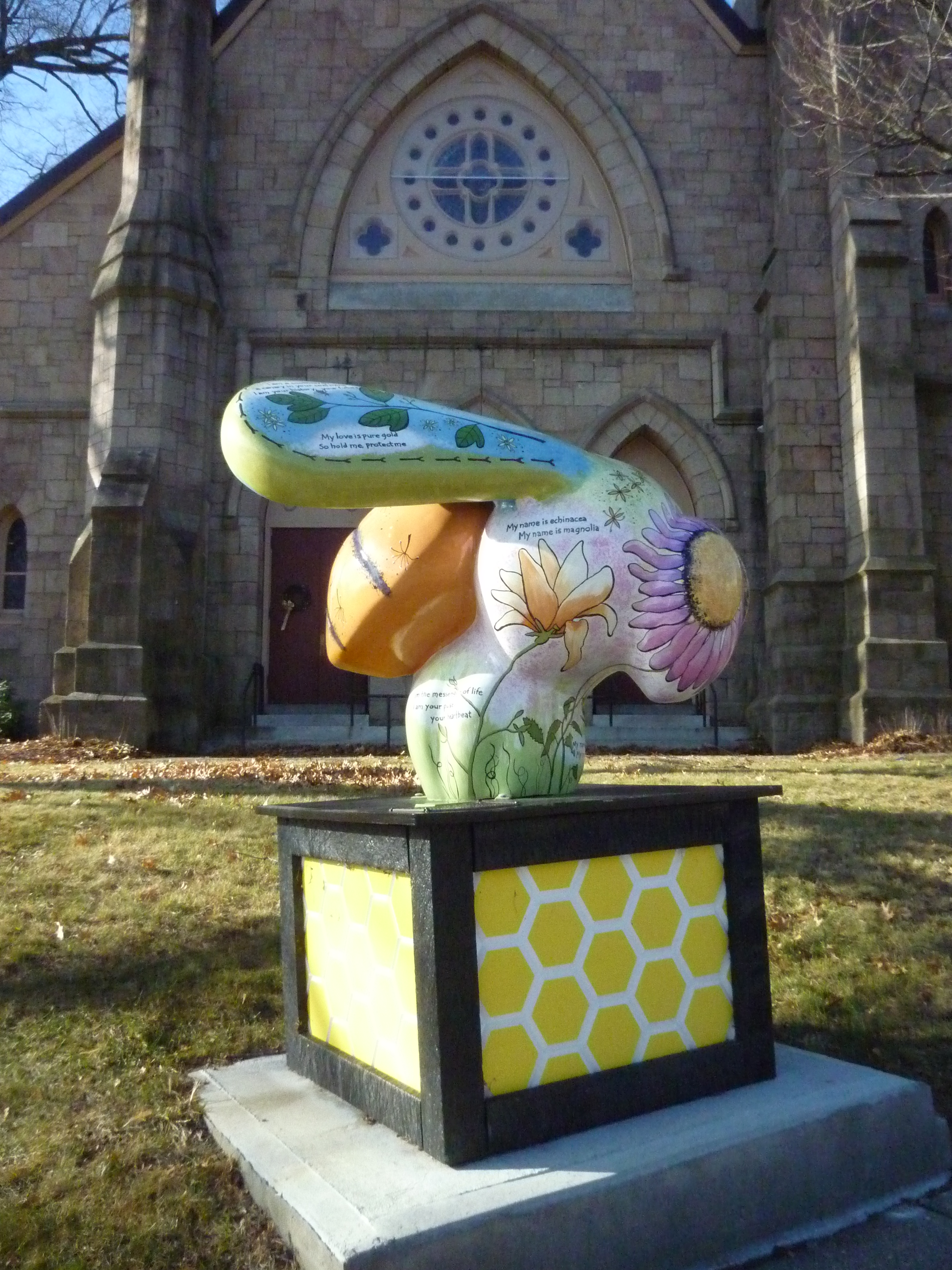
Bee Sculpture "My Name is Life" in front of the Second Congregational Church in Court Square

For many years, Greenfield was the home of Lorenzo Langstroth, known as the "Father of Modern Beekeeping," and the city celebrates Langstroth's life and contributions with bee-themed events and attractions.

==== Bee Fest ====
The Bee Fest was launched in 2010 by Greenfield's Second Congregational Church, where Langstroth was pastor during the late 1840s. The first Bee Fest served to celebrate the 200th anniversary of Langstroth's birth and to highlight the importance of the honeybee in sustaining the environment and in human agriculture. Bee Fest, now an annual celebration held in the spring, overlooks the center of town and Court Square and offers fun and learning for all ages.

==== Downtown Bee Sculptures ====
Greenfield has nine large bee sculptures, six of them installed in 2021 and three in 2022. Local artist Rachael Katz designed the sculptures and was a motive force in the overall project. Other local artists painted the bees in colorful themes. The project received support from the Massachusetts Cultural Council, local businesses and non-profit organizations, and the community.

==== Other Bee-Themed Attractions ====
Greenfield has a pocket park with educational installations, a painted crosswalk, lamppost signage, and parking garage banners, all themed around and celebrating Langstroth and honeybees. In 2021, the entire Franklin County Fair Kick-Off Parade was bee-themed, with many bee-decorated floats and marchers in bee costumes.

=== Contra dancing ===
A contra dance in Greenfield

Greenfield is an epicenter of contra dancing, an American social folk dance.

== Attractions ==
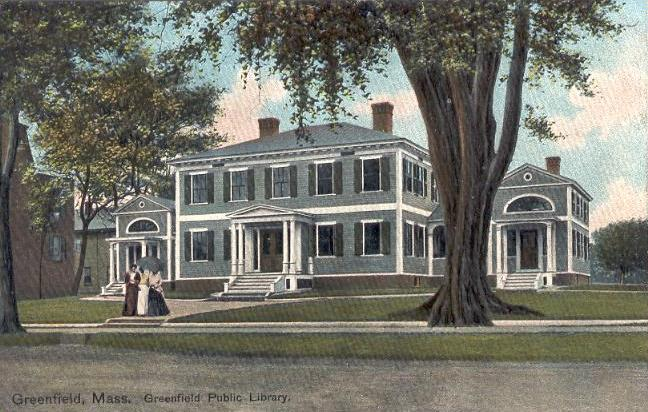
Leavitt-Hovey House c. 1910

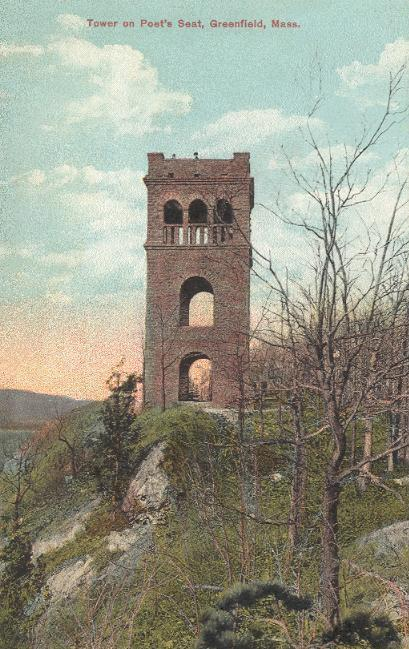
Poet's Seat Tower c. 1915

- The Crossroads Cultural District, named by the Massachusetts Cultural Council and the Commonwealth of Massachusetts in 2016.
- Historical Society of Greenfield, 43 Church Street.
- Greenfield Center School, an independent K–8th grade school, is a site of the Coalition of Essential Schools and the home of the New England Coalition of Progressive Educators.
- Greenfield Energy Park is a community greenspace featuring renewable energy exhibits, gardens, native arboretum, caboose museum, concerts, and public art in the heart of downtown Greenfield. It is the site of the former train station. The park was developed by the Northeast Sustainable Energy Association (NESEA) which was headquartered there, and later turned over to the Town of Greenfield.
- Leavitt-Hovey House, until recently the Greenfield Public Library, built in 1797 by Asher Benjamin for judge Jonathan Leavitt.
- The area is home to an optical illusion known as a gravity hill. It is located on Shelburne Road, while facing Greenfield, immediately after the Route 2 bridge. From under the overpass, the road appears to rise slightly to a crest a few hundred feet away. The illusion is slight, but convincing. A car in neutral at the "bottom" of the rise will appear to crawl uphill.
- Rocky Mountain Park features Poet's Seat Tower, a 1912 sandstone observation tower named for the site's attraction to poets, particularly Frederick Goddard Tuckerman. The annual Fourth of July fireworks celebration takes place at Poet's Seat, which overlooks Beacon Field.
- Wilson's Department Store, opened in 1882 and one of the few old-style large independent family-owned department stores remaining in America, until closing in 2020 after 138 years in business.

== Infrastructure ==
Greenfield lies at the junction of four highways. Interstate 91 travels north and south through the western stretch of the city and is duplexed for a 3-mile (5 km) stretch with Massachusetts Route 2. Route 2, which follows the rough path of (and is nicknamed after) the Mohawk Trail, enters over the Fall River as a surface road before becoming a limited-access highway until its concurrence with I-91. Once it leaves the interstate, Route 2 becomes a surface road again. Between the start of the limited access section of Route 2 and its split from I-91 at Exit 43, the Mohawk Trail follows Massachusetts Route 2A, which uses Route 2's former right of way through the center of Greenfield. At the town center, Route 2A meets the duplexed U.S. Route 5 and Massachusetts Route 10, which comes over the Deerfield River in the south before heading northward through town, with another interchange along the highway portion of Route 2. In October 2016, the administration of Massachusetts Governor Charlie Baker announced a $7.5 million grant to the town government to build a new downtown parking garage.

The nearest general aviation airport is located in the Turners Falls section of Montague, and the nearest national air service is at Bradley International Airport in Windsor Locks, Connecticut.

=== Bus ===
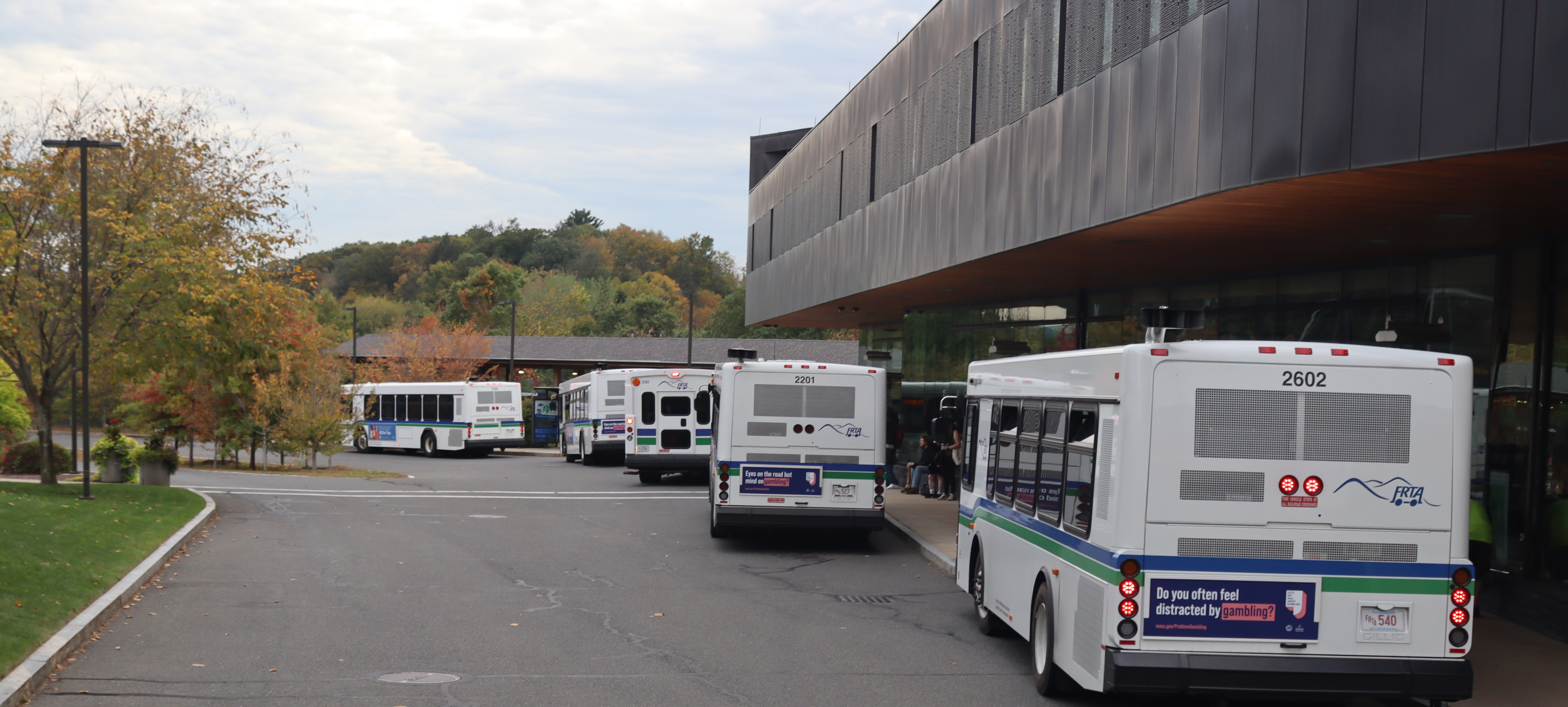
FRTA Buses Lined Up at John W. Olver Transit Center Awaiting Amtrak Passengers in October, 2025.

The town is served by Greyhound bus lines and is the hub of the Franklin Regional Transit Authority (FRTA), whose local service extends from Bernardston to Northampton and from Orange to Charlemont, gradually taking the role of the former Greenfield & Montague Transportation Area, which had been formed following the receivership (bankruptcy) of the Connecticut Valley Street Railway to operate the part of the trolley line between Greenfield & Turners Falls, which it did until the 1930s when the GMTA trustees (on behalf of town selectmen) voted to tear up the tracks following a brief reduction in revenue.

Today, the John W. Olver Transit Center is the hub for FRTA bus service (which traces nearly all of the former routes of the trolley system) and which is also serves as the local stop for Greyhound's intercity service. The FRTA synchronizes bus schedules to align with Amtrak train arrivals and since 2019 has offered a cash-only microtransit dial-a-ride and app service called 'FRTA Access' whick allows anyone to schedule a next-day or same-day ride anywhere within the county.

In January 2026 the three regional transit authorities in Western Mass launched Link413, a joint collaboration that offers customers three new longer-distance, weekday bus routes providing direct service across four counties and enabling out-of-state connections. With the launch of the Link413 service, a new weekday bus was established between Greenfield and North Adams and via the communities of Adams, Savoy, Plainfield, Ashfield and Charlemont.

=== Rail ===
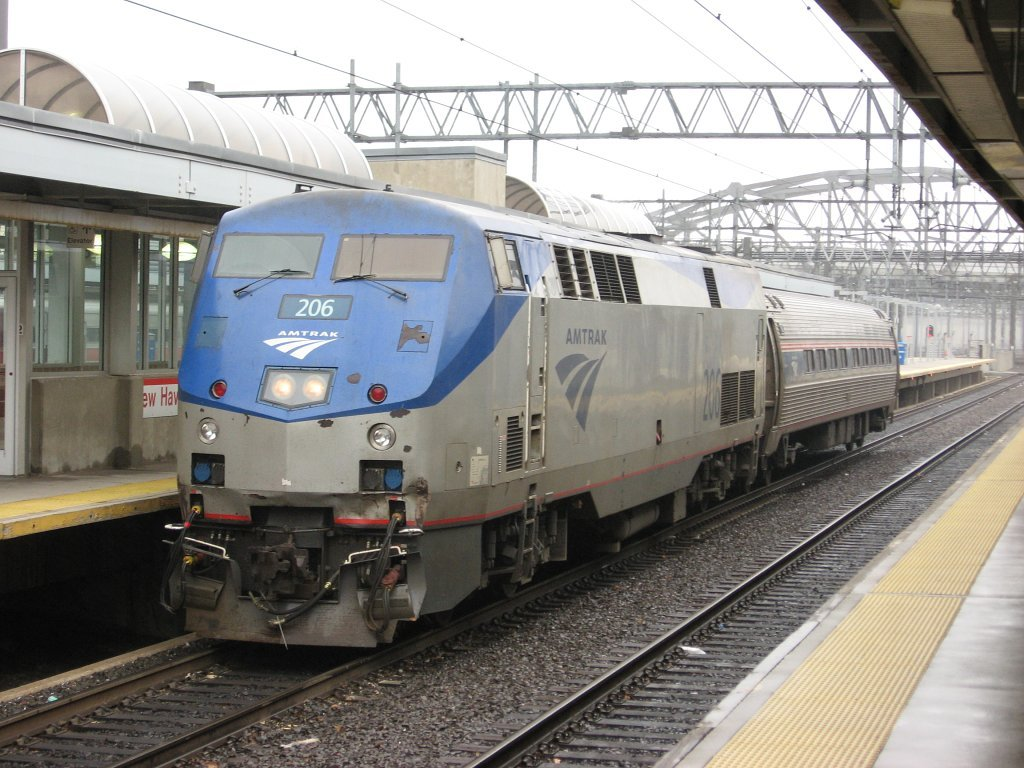
Engine and single-car train for the New Haven–Springfield Shuttle. Expanded train service connecting Greenfield to points south to New Haven began in summer 2019, and has been named the Valley Flyer.

Greenfield lies at the junction of two rail lines, an east–west line heading from the northern points of Worcester County towards the Hoosac Tunnel and Mechanicville, New York, and the north–south line heading from Springfield in the south towards Vermont in the north. Freight service on those lines is operated by the Berkshire and Eastern Railroad, a subsidiary of Genesee & Wyoming operating on behalf of Pan Am Southern, which is a jointly owned venture between CSX and Norfolk Southern.

Passenger rail service resumed in Greenfield on December 29, 2014, with the rerouting of Amtrak's Vermonter, with all trains serving the Olver Transit Center. The former Greenfield train station (torn down in 1966) was located in what is now the Greenfield Energy Park.

In June 2018, it was announced that Greenfield would become the terminus for an extension of the Amtrak-operated Hartford Line service, in a pilot program that was launched by MassDOT. The new service, now dubbed the Valley Flyer, made its first run August 30, 2019. It runs twice in each direction on weekdays and once on weekends, to and from New Haven, Connecticut, with connections to New York City. There is a proposal known as Northern Tier Passenger Rail in the early stages of planning, which would extend Amtrak service from Boston North Station through Greenfield and terminate at North Adams.

== Education ==
Greenfield operates its own public school system for the town's 1,700 students. Greenfield operates the Academy of Early Learning at North Parish for pre-kindergarten students, three elementary schools—the Four Corners School to the north, the Federal Street School centrally, and the Newton Elementary School to the west—for students from kindergarten through fourth grade, the Greenfield Middle School for students from fifth grade through seventh grades, and Greenfield High School for eighth through twelfth grades. 8th grade is separate and not part of the official high school. Greenfield's athletic teams are nicknamed the "Green Wave", and their school colors are green and white.

=== Alternative public schools ===
On July 9, 2009, Greenfield's local school committee approved creation of the Virtual Academy or "MAVA @ Greenfield", a kindergarten-through-twelfth grade distance learning school in the state. The school underperformed and subsequently closed.

=== Private schools ===
Greenfield's oldest private school is the Stoneleigh-Burnham School, a private 7th–12th grade boarding school for girls. The Center School, established in 1981, serves students from preschool through eighth grade with a progressive approach to education.

As of 2014 there are no religious schools in Greenfield; the Cornerstone Christian School closed in 2013, and Holy Trinity School, a K–8 parochial school, closed in 2011.

=== Higher education ===
Greenfield is home to Greenfield Community College, which serves the northern Pioneer Valley and offers some courses to Greenfield High students seeking advanced learning opportunities.

The nearest state university is the University of Massachusetts Amherst. There are also several private colleges, including members of the Five Colleges and Seven Sisters, in the region, as well as Keene State College in Keene, New Hampshire.

== Media ==
Greenfield has five FM radio stations, one FM Translator, one AM radio station, one cable television station, and one daily local newspaper.

FM stations

- 95.3 WPVQ-FM (Country) Saga Communications
- 98.3 WHAI (Adult contemporary) Saga Communications
- 100.5 //WIZZ (Adult Standards) P&M Radio, LLC
- 102.9 W275AS (// WYRY-FM Country) Tri Valley Broadcast Corporation
- 107.9 WMCB-LP (Talk/Information) Greenfield Community Television¹
- 107.9 WLPV-LP (Religious) Living Waters Assembly of God Church¹

¹ – WMCB-LP/WLPV-LP operate under a "share time" agreement with the U.S. Federal Communications Commission.

AM stations

- 1520 WIZZ (Nostalgia) P&M Radio

Cable stations

- 15 (Public Access) Greenfield Community Television

Newspapers

- The Recorder

== Notable people ==
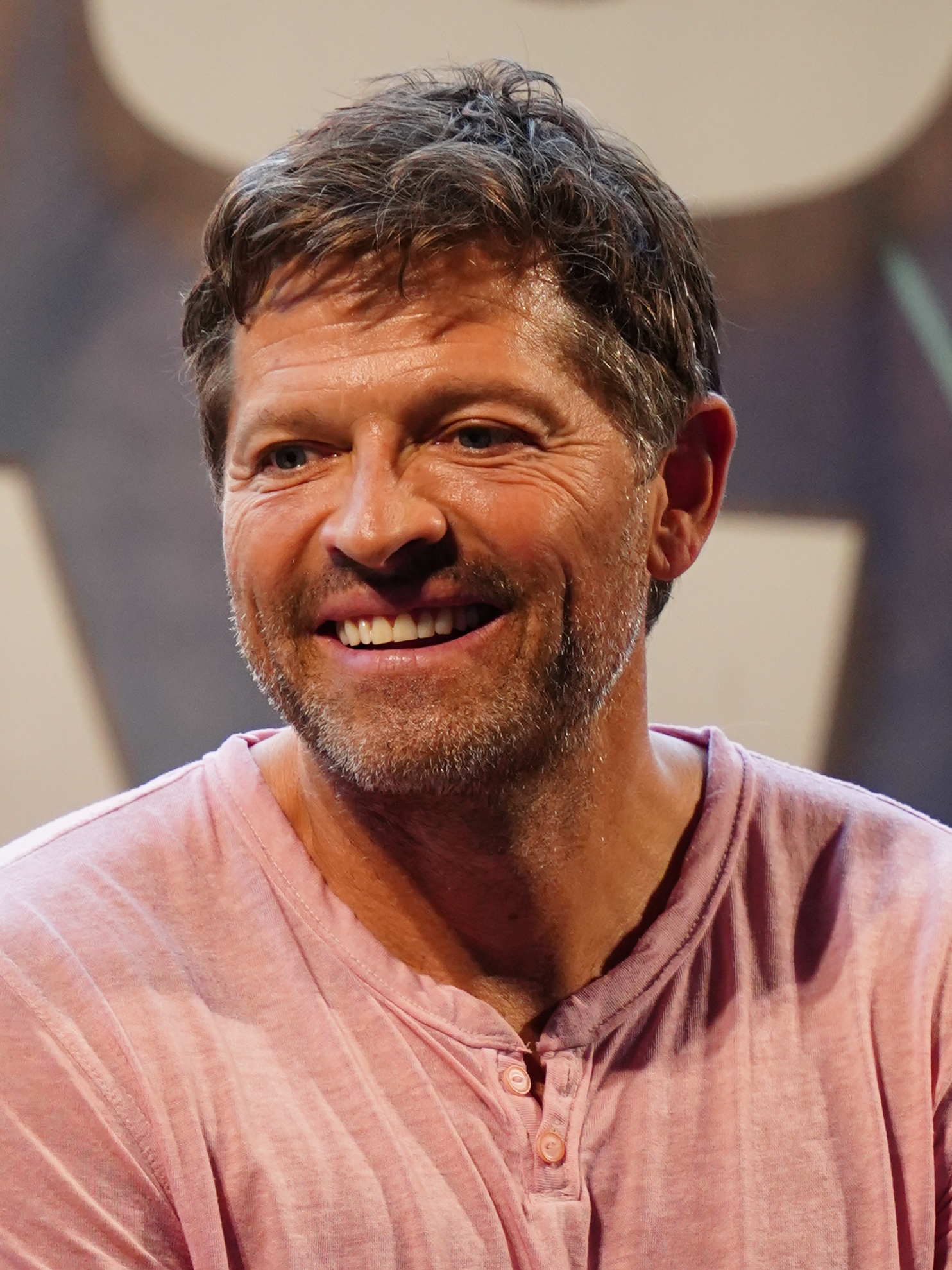
Misha Collins

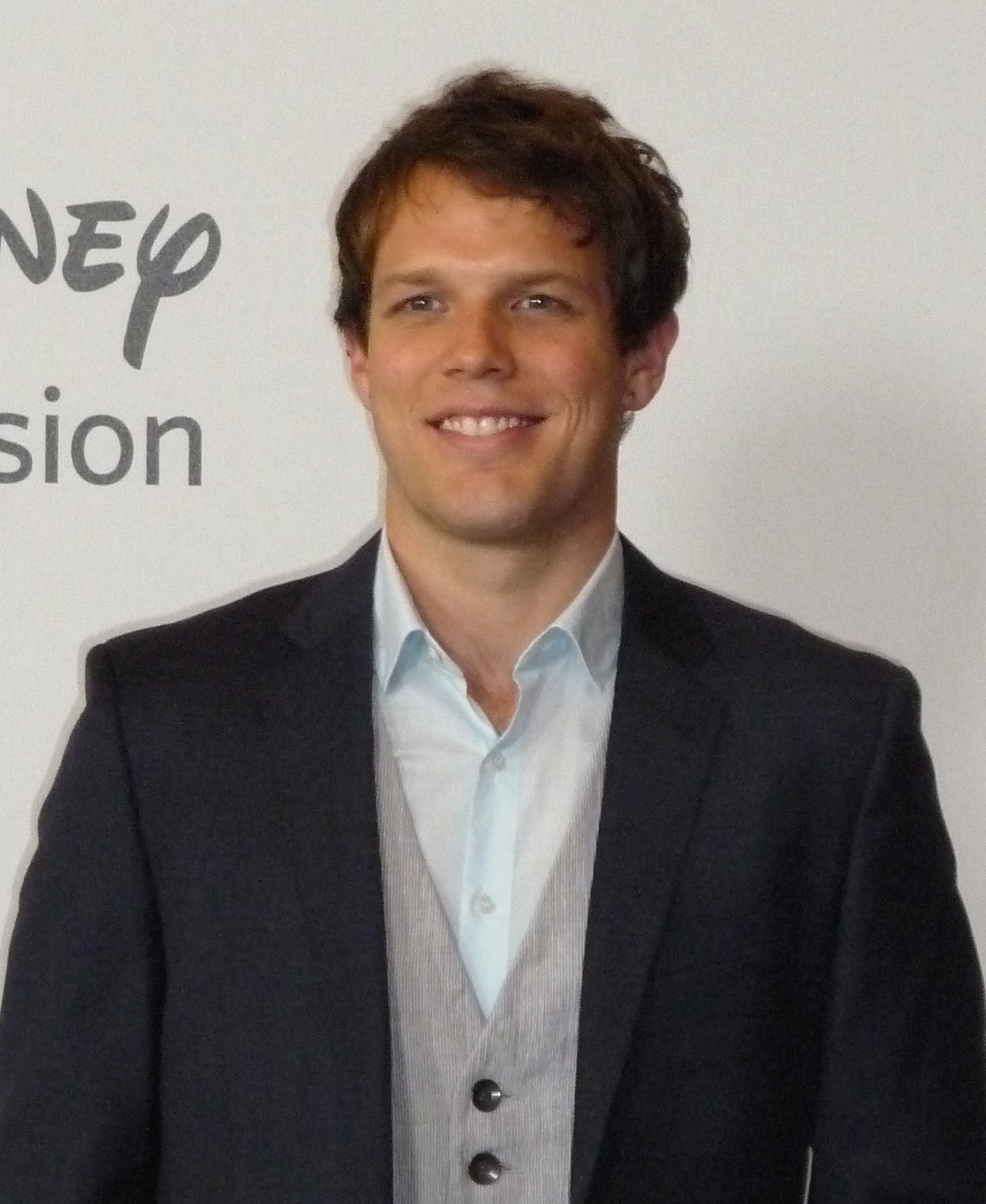
Jake Lacy

- Charles Allen, jurist
- Christopher Baldwin, comic strip artist (Bruno)
- Lou Barlow, musician Dinosaur Jr., Sebadoh, Folk Implosion
- Stan Batinski, football player
- Shenna Bellows (born 1975), Secretary of State of Maine
- Asher Benjamin, architect
- Stan Benjamin, baseball player, teacher, coach and scout
- Peter Bergeron, baseball player
- Titus Billings, religious pioneer
- Silas Bullard, Wisconsin state legislator and jurist
- Misha Collins, television and film actor
- Scott Crago, musician
- Kelly Doton, field hockey player
- Tracy Grammer, singer-songwriter
- George Grennell, Jr., congressman
- John W. Haigis, State of Massachusetts Lieutenant Governor (1929–1933), State House of Representatives, State Senator
- Van Hansis, actor (As the World Turns)
- Kevin Hassett, economist & author (now lives in Washington, D.C.)
- Herbert Huncke, Beat Generation figure
- Penn Jillette, illusionist & comedian, half of Penn & Teller magician team
- John Christopher Jones, actor
- Jake Lacy, actor
- Robin Lane, musician
- L. L. Langstroth, the “Father of American Beekeeping”
- Jonathan Leavitt, lawyer, judge, state senator & banker
- Roger Hooker Leavitt, prominent abolitionist
- Winter Miller, playwright (In Darfur)
- Michael Moschen, juggler
- Nicco, singer songwriter
- Steve Partenheimer, baseball player
- George Ripley, Transcendentalist and founder of the Brook Farm communal experiment
- John E. Russell, congressman
- Paul Fitzpatrick Russell, Roman Catholic archbishop and diplomat
- Bev Sanders, snowboarder, surfer, and company founder
- Rufus Saxton, brigadier general
- Bennett Jones Sims, Episcopal bishop
- Charles Pomeroy Stone, army officer & engineer
- Frederick Goddard Tuckerman, poet
- Fred Wallner, football player
- William B. Washburn, congressman & governor
- Rev. Samuel Merrill Woodbridge (1819–1905), Reformed minister, author, and professor at Rutgers College and New Brunswick Theological Seminary

== See also ==
- List of mill towns in Massachusetts
