= XHJP-FM =

Indigenous radio station in Santa María Tlahuitoltepec, Oaxaca

Santa María Tlahuitoltepec, Oaxaca; Mexico
- Frequency: 107.9 FM
- Branding: Jën Poj

Programming
- Format: Community

Ownership
- Owner: Comunidad de Santa María Tlahuitoltepec, Mixe, Oaxaca

History
- First air date: August 7, 2001; December 6, 2004 (permit)
- Call sign meaning: JënPoj

Technical information
- ERP: 1.06 kW
- Transmitter coordinates: 17°05′44″N 96°03′44″W

Links
- Webcast: web.archive.org/web/20160502155330/http://jenpojradio.info/portal/

XHJP-FM is a community radio station on 107.9 FM in Santa María Tlahuitoltepec, Oaxaca. It is known as Jën Poj (meaning "Winds of Fire" in Mixe) and is operated by Kukoj, A.C.

== History ==
On August 7, 2001, Jënpoj Radio took to the air on 104.9 MHz, without a permit. It was closed by the SCT in 2002, spurring a permit application. On December 6, 2004, XHJP-FM 107.9 was permitted.

In 2016, Jën Poj Radio asked to have its permit transferred to a social-indigenous concession. The change, approved by the IFT in July 2016, required the transfer of the permit from the civil association formed to hold it, Kukoj, A.C., to the Indigenous Community of Santa María Tlahuitoltepec, Mixe, Oaxaca.
