= XHDAB-FM =

Radio station in Hidalgo del Parral, Chihuahua, Mexico

- Hidalgo del Parral, Chihuahua; Mexico
- Frequency: 107.9 FM
- Branding: Radio Familia

Programming
- Format: Religious/community radio

Ownership
- Owner: Dabar Radio, A.C.

History
- First air date: 2012
- Call sign meaning: DABar Radio, A.C.

Technical information
- Licensing authority: CRT
- Class: C
- ERP: 39.070 kW
- HAAT: 551 m (1,808 ft)
- Transmitter coordinates: 26°46′9.9″N 105°53′26.3″W

Links
- Webcast: Listen live
- Website: radiofamilia.com.mx

XHDAB-FM is a radio station in Hidalgo del Parral, Chihuahua, Mexico. Known as Radio Familia, XHDAB is owned by Dabar Radio, A.C.

== History ==
The station received its permit in December 2012. XHDAB is the only permit (noncommercial) station in Parral.
