= WYRY =

- Hinsdale, New Hampshire; United States
- Broadcast area: Keene, New Hampshire
- Frequency: 104.9 MHz
- Branding: 104.9 Nash Icon

Programming
- Format: Country
- Affiliations: Westwood One

Ownership
- Owner: William Tucker and William Steele Jr.; (Tri-Valley Broadcasting)

History
- First air date: 1987

Technical information
- Licensing authority: FCC
- Facility ID: 67813
- Class: A
- ERP: 4,100 watts
- HAAT: 122 meters (400 ft)
- Transmitter coordinates: 42°46′33.3″N 72°27′15.3″W
- Translator: See § Translators

Links
- Public license information: Public file; LMS
- Website: www.1049nashiconradio.com

WYRY (104.9 MHz, "104.9 Nash Icon") is a commercial FM radio station licensed to Hinsdale, New Hampshire, and serving parts of New Hampshire, Vermont and Massachusetts. The station is owned by William Tucker and William Steele Jr., through licensee Tri-Valley Broadcasting. It airs a country music radio format. Many of the shows are syndicated from Westwood One's Nash Icon network.

The station has been assigned the WYRY call letters by the Federal Communications Commission since May 14, 1984.

The transmitter site is on Gunn Mountain, off Old Hinsdale Road in Winchester. There are incorrect reports circulating that it is on the same land that was home to the transmitter of WRLP (channel 32), a local NBC affiliate repeating WWLP's programming, until April 1978, when the channel 32 transmitter was dismantled and shipped to Utah, where channel 32's owner, William L. Putnam, was starting a new station.

On August 3, 2015, WYRY rebranded as "104.9 Nash Icon".

== Translators ==
WYRY also broadcasts on the following translators:

Broadcast translators for WYRY
Call sign	Frequency	City of license	FID	ERP (W)	HAAT	Class	Transmitter coordinates	FCC info
W275AS	102.9 FM	Greenfield, Massachusetts	147371	95	−85.5 m (−281 ft)	D	42°35′16.3″N 72°36′4.3″W	LMS
W288BN	105.5 FM	Keene, New Hampshire	147055	10	174.2 m (572 ft)	D	42°54′53.3″N 72°19′50.3″W	LMS
