= WNBI-LP =

- New Buffalo, Michigan; United States
- Frequency: 107.9 MHz
- Branding: "107.9 WNBI Bison Radio"

Programming
- Format: Variety

Ownership
- Owner: New Buffalo Area Schools

Technical information
- Licensing authority: FCC
- Facility ID: 194898
- Class: L1
- ERP: 100 watts
- HAAT: 43 metres (141 ft)
- Transmitter coordinates: 41.7925°N 86.7317°W

Links
- Public license information: LMS
- Webcast: Listen Live
- Website: Official Website

WNBI-LP (107.9 FM) is a radio station licensed to serve the community of New Buffalo, Michigan. The station is owned by New Buffalo Area Schools, and airs a variety format.

The station was assigned the WNBI-LP call letters by the Federal Communications Commission on September 7, 2015.
