= WDRW-LP =

Low-power radio station in Athens, Georgia, United States

- Athens, Georgia; United States
- Frequency: 107.9 MHz
- Branding: Athens Christian Radio

Programming
- Format: Religious

Ownership
- Owner: Christian Pursuers' Radio, Inc.

Technical information
- Licensing authority: FCC
- Facility ID: 123738
- Class: L1
- ERP: 94 watts
- HAAT: 40 metres (130 ft)
- Transmitter coordinates: 33°57′11″N 83°24′31″W

Links
- Public license information: LMS
- Webcast: [wdrw.org]
- Website: Official Website

WDRW-LP (107.9 FM) is a Christian radio station licensed to serve the community of Athens, Georgia. The station is owned by Christian Pursuers' Radio, Inc. It airs a religious radio format.

The station was assigned the WDRW-LP call letters by the Federal Communications Commission on September 29, 2004.
