= WWAG =

- McKee, Kentucky; United States
- Frequency: 107.9 MHz
- Branding: Wagon Country

Programming
- Format: Country
- Affiliations: Cumulus Media Networks; Real Country

Ownership
- Owner: Dandy Broadcasting, Inc.

Technical information
- Licensing authority: FCC
- Facility ID: 15508
- Class: A
- ERP: 3,900 Watts
- HAAT: 125 meters (410 feet)
- Transmitter coordinates: 37°23′39″N 83°54′27″W

Links
- Public license information: Public file; LMS
- Webcast: Listen Live
- Website: www.wagoncountry.com

WWAG (107.9 FM) is a radio station licensed to McKee, Kentucky. The station is owned by Dandy Broadcasting, Inc and airs a country music format.
