= WFSD-LP =

- Tallahassee, Florida; United States
- Frequency: 107.9 MHz

Programming
- Format: religious

Ownership
- Owner: Tallahassee First Seventh-day Adventist Church

History
- Call sign meaning: First Seventh-day

Technical information
- Licensing authority: FCC
- Facility ID: 133160
- Class: L1
- ERP: 59 watts
- HAAT: 39.2 meters
- Transmitter coordinates: 30°26′36.00″N 84°13′37.00″W

Links
- Public license information: LMS
- Webcast: Live stream
- Website: Official website

WFSD-LP (107.9 FM) is a low-power FM radio station broadcasting a Christian inspirational format. Licensed to Tallahassee, Florida, United States, the station is currently owned by Tallahassee First Seventh-day Adventist Church, affiliated with LifeTalk Radio.
