= CKBG-FM =

Radio station in Amherstburg, Ontario

- Amherstburg, Ontario; Canada
- Frequency: 107.9 MHz
- Branding: The Burg

Programming
- Format: Adult contemporary

Ownership
- Owner: Amherstburg Broadcasting Corporation; (Martyn Adler)

History
- First air date: July 3, 2023
- Call sign meaning: BG from "burg"

Technical information
- ERP: 50 watts
- HAAT: 51.6 m (169 ft)

Links
- Website: https://www.ckbg.ca/

CKBG-FM is a low-power FM adult contemporary radio station licensed to Amherstburg, Ontario, broadcasting on 107.9 MHz, owned by Martyn Adler's Amherstburg Broadcasting Corporation. The station had applied for a license to broadcast in 2021, but was initially denied. However, the station's identical application in 2022 was accepted by the CRTC. The station began on-air testing in late April 2023, along with streaming test programming on their website, before announcing an official launch date of July 3, 2023. CKBG-FM 107.9 is also branded as The Burg.

On February 20, 2024, it was announced that long-time 89X (CIMX-FM) on-air host Mark McKenzie had taken over as morning show host.
