= WMDI-LP =

- Lakewood, New Jersey; United States
- Broadcast area: Monmouth, New Jersey, area
- Frequency: 107.9 MHz

Ownership
- Owner: American Institute For Jewish Education

History
- First air date: August 2003

Technical information
- Licensing authority: FCC
- Facility ID: 134469
- Class: L1
- ERP: 100 watts
- HAAT: 14.4 meters (47 ft)
- Transmitter coordinates: 40°5′46.00″N 74°13′21.00″W

Links
- Public license information: LMS
- Webcast: newyorkjewishradio.com

WMDI-LP (107.9 FM) is low-power FM radio station owned by the American Institute For Jewish Education.

The AIJE was granted a construction permit in March 2003. The WMDI-LP calls were assigned on May 12, 2003. The station, serving the Lakewood area, began broadcasting in August 2003.

Its programming consists of Jewish music, classes and information of special interest to the area's Jewish community.
