= XS (radio station) =

Radio station in Neath Port Talbot, Wales

Coordinates: 51.5901°N 3.8106°W

XS South Wales
- Port Talbot; Wales
- Broadcast area: Neath Port Talbot
- Frequencies: 97.4 MHz (Neath & Neath Valleys); 107.9 MHz (Port Talbot)
- RDS: XS

Programming
- Format: Community radio

Ownership
- Owner: Neath Port Talbot Broadcasting CIC

History
- First air date: 20 April 2007
- Last air date: 14 December 2011

Links
- Webcast: Listen Live
- Website: XS South Wales

XS (formerly Afan FM) was a community radio station which served Neath Port Talbot. The station was owned and operated by Neath Port Talbot Broadcasting CIC and aired a mix of dance and alternative music and local information, targeted at 11-25 year olds. The station was based at studios in the Water Street Business Centre in Port Talbot.

== History ==
Afan FM was established in 2003 and went on to run five restricted service licence (RSL) trial broadcasts before becoming the UK's first new community radio station (following the initial tranche of 16 "Access Radio" trial stations) with the award of licence CR005 by the UK broadcast regulator Ofcom in April 2005. Afan FM began test transmissions on 107.9 MHz on 17 April 2007 and was officially launched at 2pm on 20 April 2007.

The station completed its second coverage phase when it launched its transmitter on 97.4 MHz for the Neath and Neath Valleys area on Thursday 23 October 2008. There were plans for extending coverage to the remainder of the Neath Port Talbot area via a series of relay transmitters. The station also streamed online via its website with a 192 kbit/s MP3 feed. Afan FM was rebranded as XS Wales on 7 January 2011 in order to reposition itself as Neath & Port Talbot's Hit Music Station, complete with a new logo, audio imaging, website, and a launched schedule.

The station ended live programming on Tuesday 13 December 2011 and ceased broadcasting a day later.
