= XHTM-FM =

Radio station in Tepalcatepec, Michoacán

Tepalcatepec, Michoacán; Mexico
- Frequency: 107.9 MHz
- Branding: Cultural FM

Programming
- Format: Community radio

Ownership
- Owner: Radio Cultural de Tepalcatepec, A.C.

History
- First air date: January 17, 2003
- Call sign meaning: "Tepalcatepec, Michoacán"

Technical information
- ERP: 300 watts
- HAAT: -48.5 meters
- Transmitter coordinates: 19°11′34.73″N 102°50′41.31″W

Links
- Website: web.archive.org/web/20160109164122/http://culturalfm.com.mx/

XHTM-FM is a community radio station in Tepalcatepec, Michoacán, Mexico. The station broadcasts on 107.9 FM and is known as Cultural FM.

== History ==
XHTM began unlicensed operations on 99.5 FM on January 17, 2003. Upon receiving a permit to operate on 107.9 MHz in December 2004, Cultural FM moved to that frequency.

XHTM was off the air for a month in 2012 when lightning struck its tower and damaged its transmitter.
