= KXVR-LP =

Corpus Christi, Texas; United States
- Broadcast area: Corpus Christi
- Frequency: 107.9 MHz
- Branding: Alcance Broadcast Network

Programming
- Format: Religious

Ownership
- Owner: Comunidad Cristiana of Corpus Christi

Technical information
- Licensing authority: FCC
- Facility ID: 134465
- Class: L1
- ERP: 93 watts
- HAAT: 30.8 meters (101 ft)
- Transmitter coordinates: 27°46′44.00″N 97°36′48.00″W

Links
- Public license information: LMS

KXVR-LP (107.9 FM, "Alcance Broadcast Network") is a radio station broadcasting a religious format. Licensed to Corpus Christi, Texas, United States, the station serves the Corpus Christi area. The station is currently owned by Comunidad Cristiana of Corpus Christi.
