= WUCR-LP =

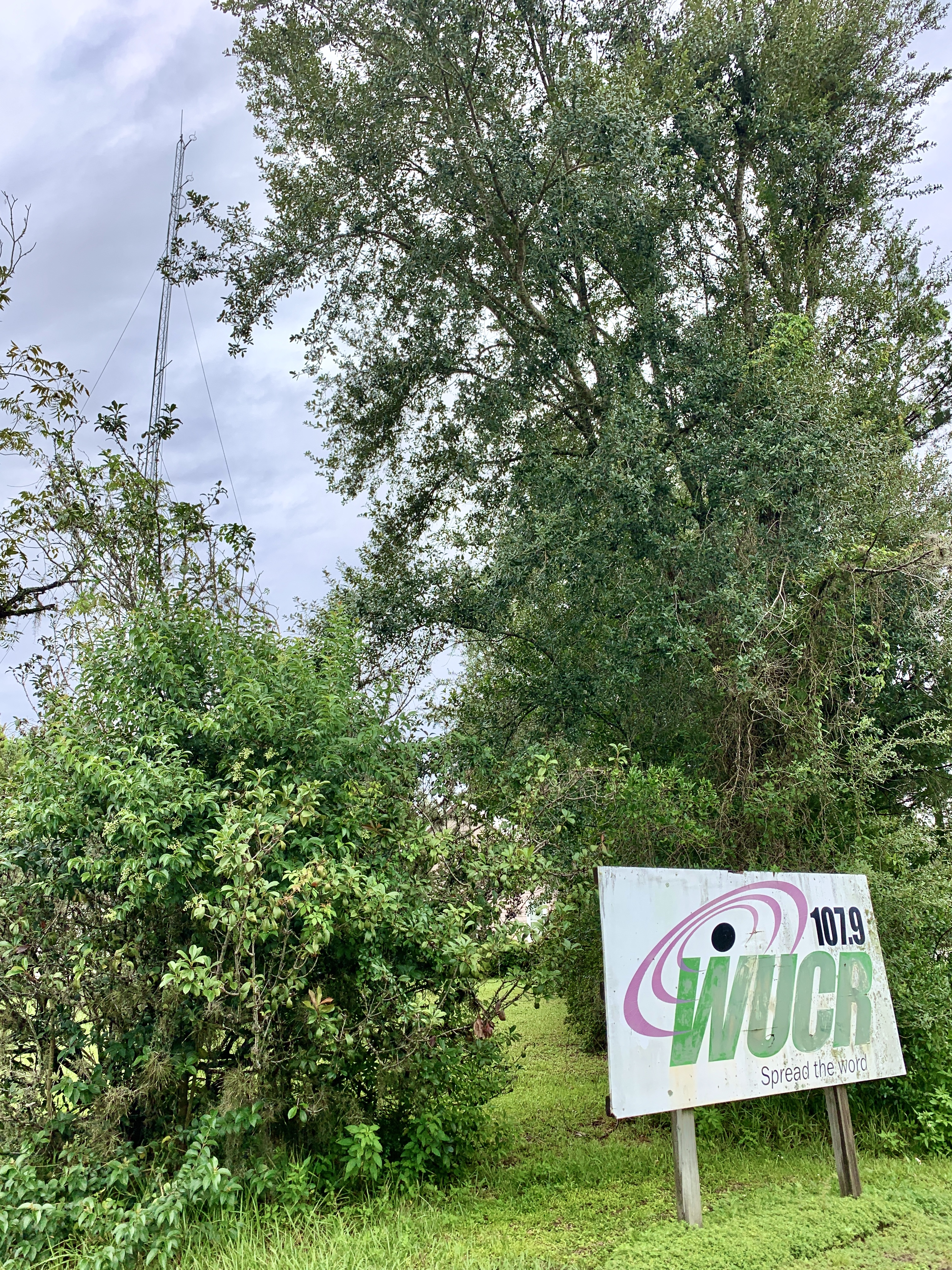
- Lake Butler, Florida; United States
- Frequency: 107.9 MHz

Ownership
- Owner: Synewave Communications, Inc

History
- Call sign meaning: Union County Radio

Technical information
- Licensing authority: FCC
- Facility ID: 134253
- Class: L1
- ERP: 100 watts
- HAAT: 28.8 meters (94 ft)
- Transmitter coordinates: 30°01′6.86″N 82°20′30.41″W

Links
- Public license information: LMS
- Website: unioncountyradio.com

WUCR-LP (107.9 FM) is a radio station licensed to Lake Butler, Florida, United States. The station is currently owned by Synewave Communications, Inc.
