= KFIN =

Country music radio station in Jonesboro, Arkansas, United States

- Jonesboro, Arkansas; United States
- Frequency: 107.9 MHz
- Branding: The Big 107-9 KFIN (pronounced as "K-Fine")

Programming
- Format: Country

Ownership
- Owner: East Arkansas Broadcasters

History
- First air date: March 4, 1974

Technical information
- Licensing authority: FCC
- Facility ID: 17690
- Class: C1
- ERP: 100,000 watts
- HAAT: 183 meters
- Transmitter coordinates: 35.799°N 90.742°W

Links
- Public license information: Public file; LMS
- Website: KFIN Online

KFIN is a commercial radio station located in Jonesboro, Arkansas, broadcasting on 107.9 FM. KFIN airs a country music format. KFIN is a 98,000 watt station, reaching listeners in all of Northeast Arkansas, as well as Southeast Missouri, Western Tennessee, and Western Mississippi.

The station was purchased in 2007 by Bobby Caldwell's East Arkansas Broadcasters from Clear Channel Communications.

Scott Siler has managed the station since May 2007.

KFIN is the flagship station for Arkansas' Morning Show with Brandon & Kelly (starring Brandon Baxter and Kelly Perry).

KFIN is also the flagship station for the EAB Sports Network, Arkansas State Football, and Arkansas State Men's Basketball.
