= KTIC (AM) =

Radio station in West Point, Nebraska

- West Point, Nebraska; United States
- Broadcast area: Eastern Nebraska; Lincoln metropolitan area; Omaha metropolitan area; Sioux City metropolitan area
- Frequency: 840 kHz C-QUAM AM stereo
- Branding: 840 Rural Radio

Programming
- Language: English
- Format: Classic country
- Affiliations: Fox News Radio; Nebraska Cornhuskers

Ownership
- Owner: Nebraska Rural Radio Association
- Sister stations: KTIC-FM

History
- First air date: March 1985
- Former call signs: KWPN (1985–1995)

Technical information
- Licensing authority: FCC
- Facility ID: 33880
- Class: AM & FM: D
- Power: AM: 5,000 watts (daytime only)
- ERP: K252EG: 205 watts; K254CX: 250 watts
- Transmitter coordinates: 41°47′3″N 96°40′47.1″W
- Translators: 98.3 K252EG (West Point); 98.7 K254CX (Norfolk)

Links
- Public license information: Public file; LMS
- Webcast: Listen live
- Website: ruralradio.com/ktic/

KTIC (840 kHz) is an AM radio station broadcasting a classic country format. Like its sister music station KTIC-FM, it is licensed to West Point, Nebraska. The station serves eastern Nebraska, Lincoln metropolitan area, Omaha metropolitan area and the Sioux City metropolitan area. The station is owned by the Nebraska Rural Radio Association and features programming from Fox News Radio and Nebraska Cornhuskers.

== History ==
KTIC first began broadcasting on March 17, 1985, under the original call sign KWPN. At its inception, the station was owned by Kelly Communications, led by David and Sharon Kelly, and operated as a daytime-only station with a power of 2,500 watts. The station’s primary focus from the start was serving the agricultural community with a blend of country music, farm news, and weekend polka programming. In 1988, the station increased its daytime power to 5,000 watts. Although the owners sought a construction permit for unlimited 24-hour operation, the request was denied by the FCC because the 840 AM frequency is a clear-channel signal reserved for WHAS in Louisville, Kentucky at night.

The station officially changed its call letters to KTIC in 1995 to better align with its identity as a farm and market information leader. In August 1997, the station was sold to the Nebraska Rural Radio Association for $1.5 million, becoming part of a farmer-owned cooperative network designed to provide critical market and weather data to rural areas.

== Programming ==
As a primary affiliate of the Rural Radio Network, KTIC provides "Futures Updates" and agricultural news twice every hour during the trading day. The Rural Radio network is a part of the National Association of Farm Broadcasting. The station's commitment to the local community includes dedicated programming slots for regional agricultural organizations and a heavy emphasis on weather updates, which were historically prioritized by the Nebraska Rural Radio Association following devastating blizzards in the late 1940s.

KTIC uses C-QUAM AM Stereo, a broadcasting method that allows the AM signal to be received in stereo by compatible tuners. While many AM stations abandoned the technology in the 1990s, KTIC maintained its commitment to using the technology. In 1992, the station also transitioned into a "Full Service" model, expanding its newsroom focused exclusively on regional events and news relevant to the agribusiness sector.

While the 840 AM signal is required to cease operations at sunset to protect the clear-channel signal of WHAS in Louisville, Kentucky, the station maintains a 24-hour presence through its FM translators. Its programming is currently simulcast on 98.3 FM (K252EG) in West Point and 98.7 FM (K254CX) in Norfolk. These translators operate at a power of 205 watts and 250 watts, respectively, ensuring that the station's farm and market reports remain accessible after the AM transmitter is powered down.

Logo before 98.7 translator sign on
