= KCLQ =

- Lebanon, Missouri; United States
- Frequency: 107.9 MHz
- Branding: 107.9 The Coyote

Programming
- Format: Country

Ownership
- Owner: Go Productions LLC

History
- First air date: 1979
- Former call signs: KLWT-FM (1979–1993)

Technical information
- Licensing authority: FCC
- Facility ID: 36877
- Class: C2
- ERP: 19,000 watts
- HAAT: 204 meters (669 ft)
- Transmitter coordinates: 37°48′11″N 92°33′1″W

Links
- Public license information: Public file; LMS
- Website: 1079thecoyote.com

KCLQ (107.9 FM, "107.9 The Coyote") is a radio station broadcasting a country music format. Licensed to Lebanon, Missouri, United States, the station is currently owned by Go Productions LLC. The Coyote is home to The Crystal and The Bear Show, Jamie Turner and James Clay in the afternoon.
