= XHZV-FM =

Community radio station in Zapotitlán de Vadillo, Jalisco, Mexico

- Zapotitlán de Vadillo, Jalisco; Mexico
- Frequency: 107.9 MHz
- Branding: Radio Zapotitlán

Programming
- Format: Community radio

Ownership
- Owner: Ecos de Manantlán, A.C.

History
- First air date: 2000
- Call sign meaning: Zapotitlán de Vadillo

Technical information
- Licensing authority: CRT
- Class: D
- ERP: .039 kW
- HAAT: −75.3 m (−247 ft)
- Transmitter coordinates: 19°32′52″N 103°48′47″W

Links
- Website: web.archive.org/web/20151018012343/http://radiozapotitlan.com/

XHZV-FM is a community radio station in Zapotitlán de Vadillo, Jalisco. It broadcasts on 107.9 FM and is known as Radio Zapotitlán.

== History ==
XHZV began operations in 2000 and received its permit on December 22, 2004.
