= WIMM One =

Developer device for the WIMM platform produced by WIMM Labs

- Manufacturer: WIMM Labs
- Type: Smartwatch
- Series: WIMM
- First released: November 9, 2011
- Dimensions: 36 mm (1.4 in) H 32 mm (1.3 in) W 12.5 mm (0.49 in) D.
- Weight: 22 g (0.78 oz)
- Operating system: Android 2.1 with Custom UI
- CPU: 667 MHz ARM11
- Memory: 256 MB RAM
- Storage: 2–32 GB (flash nand memory)
- Battery: Lithium ion 3.7 V, 230 mAh; Run time: 30 hours
- Display: 160×160 px, 1.0 in (2.5 cm) at 160 ppi, Multi-touch, capacitive touchscreen, transflective, Always on
- Connectivity: Bluetooth 2.1; Wi-Fi 802.11b/g; 14-pin connector supporting USB 2.0
- Other: Custom UI and Development Addons; 3-axis Magnetometer (Compass); 3-axis accelerometer

The WIMM One is a developer device for the WIMM platform produced by WIMM Labs. It is a wearable computing device running a modified version of the Android operating system. It comes preloaded with several apps. Additional applications can be downloaded from the micro app store or side-loaded over USB.

== Features ==
=== Screen ===
The WIMM One has a transflective bi-modal screen. In high power mode it can reproduce colour images with an 18-bit colour depth (OS limited to 16-bit). In low-power mode it can reproduce 4-bit grayscale images. The WIMM One's screen is on all the time the device is powered on. This allows information to be readily available to the user without them having to interact with the device. When the device is in low power mode the screen is updated once per minute. When the device is woken into high-power mode the screen refreshes at 60 fps and fully interactive apps can be run.

=== Sensors ===
The WIMM One has a complement of sensors similar to that of a smart phone including:

- 3-axis Magnetometer (Compass)
- 3-axis accelerometer

=== 14-pin connector ===
A 14-pin connector runs across the back of the WIMM One. This is used for charging and USB communications. It also supports data communication with accessories developed for the WIMM platform.

=== Communications ===
For access to the outside world the WIMM One has 2 radios. One for Wi-Fi 802.11b/g and one for Bluetooth 2.1. These are aggressively power managed by the OS. The Wi-Fi radio is only turned on for short bursts where it is used to sync data. The Bluetooth radio can be used to maintain a connection with a smart phone running Android, BlackBerryOS or iOS. This allows the WIMM One to react to telephony events such as incoming calls, for example allowing calls to be rejected to voicemail. When paired with Android smartphones, it will also receive SMS and contact information. The Bluetooth link can also be used to sync data by taking advantage of the paired device's internet connectivity. Syncing happens at a user set interval between 30 minutes and 12 hours. Applications can also request an immediate network connection off of schedule.

Due to the form factor of the device being significantly different from the majority of Android devices, many of the default Android UI elements are unwieldy on the WIMM. To compensate for this a set of custom widgets and APIs are provided for developers. These include widgets for text entry and dialog boxes. Applications developed for the WIMM One can be uploaded to the * provided by WIMM Labs. Instead of heavy management on the module's screen, users can manage their apps and standard module settings through a web-based console from their desktop or smartphone. Standard settings include calendar setup (Outlook and Google), global cities, sync intervals, and date/time formats. The WIMM One automatically installs applications that have been selected in the web console.

== Reception ==
The WIMM One has been generally well received with significant press gained from The Verge and Engadget. This has included a front page feature on Engadget's Distro magazine. According to WIMM's Website, in the summer of 2012 WIMM Labs entered into an exclusive, confidential relationship with an unnamed company and ceased sales of the Developer Preview Kit. Existing WIMM One owners can continue to synchronize their devices. As of August 2013 it is known that Google is the partner of this relationship.

== See also ==
- Wearable computer
- Wristwatch computer
