= KQLM =

Radio station in Odessa, Texas

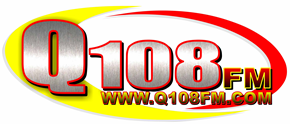
- Odessa, Texas; United States
- Broadcast area: Midland-Odessa
- Frequency: 107.9 MHz
- Branding: Q108 FM

Programming
- Format: Regional Mexican

Ownership
- Owner: Stellar Media Inc.

Technical information
- Licensing authority: FCC
- Facility ID: 57918
- Class: C1
- ERP: 100,000 watts
- HAAT: 258 meters (846 ft)
- Transmitter coordinates: 32.098°N 102.290°W

Links
- Public license information: Public file; LMS
- Website: q108fm.com

KQLM (107.9 FM, "La Nueva Q108") is a radio station that serves the Midland–Odessa metropolitan area with Regional Mexican music. The station is under ownership of Stellar Media Inc.
