= KVTS-LP =

Coordinates: 36.974°N 93.427°W

KVTS
- Republic, Missouri; United States
- Broadcast area: Springfield, Missouri
- Frequency: 107.9 MHz
- Branding: His Wave 107.9 FM

Programming
- Format: Religious

Ownership
- Owner: Calvary Chapel of Republic

History
- First air date: 2007
- Call sign meaning: Knowing Victory Thru Scripture

Technical information
- Licensing authority: FCC
- Facility ID: 132128
- Class: L1
- ERP: 100 watts
- HAAT: 27.2 meters

Links
- Public license information: Public file; LMS
- Website: hiswaveradio.com

KVTS (107.9 FM) is a radio station broadcasting a religious format. Licensed to Republic, Missouri, United States, it serves the Springfield MO area on a LPFM signal that can be heard within the southern portions of Greene County. The station is currently owned by Calvary Chapel of Republic.
