= KLNX-LP =

- Minturn, Colorado; United States
- Broadcast area: Eagle Valley, Colorado
- Frequency: 107.9 MHz

Ownership
- Owner: Minturn Public Radio

Technical information
- Licensing authority: FCC
- Facility ID: 131946
- Class: L1
- ERP: 28 watts
- HAAT: 55.0 meters (180.4 ft)
- Transmitter coordinates: 39°38′5″N 106°26′47″W

Links
- Public license information: LMS
- Webcast: Listen Live
- Website: radiofreeminturn.org

KLNX-LP (107.9 FM) is a radio station licensed to Minturn, Colorado, United States. The station is currently owned by Minturn Public Radio.
