= WMCB-LP =

- Greenfield, Massachusetts; United States
- Frequency: 107.9 MHz

Programming
- Format: Community

Ownership
- Owner: Greenfield Community Television, Inc.

History
- First air date: May 2008
- Call sign meaning: Western Massachusetts Community Broadcasting

Technical information
- Licensing authority: FCC
- Facility ID: 134902
- Class: L1
- ERP: 100 watts
- HAAT: −36.1 meters (−118 ft)
- Transmitter coordinates: 42°36′18″N 72°36′16″W

Links
- Public license information: LMS
- Webcast: Listen live
- Website: www.wmcb.net

WMCB-LP (107.9 FM) is a radio station licensed to serve Greenfield, Massachusetts. The station is owned by Greenfield Community Television, Inc. It airs a community radio format. The station first aired in May 2008.

WMCB-LP previously shared the 107.9 MHz frequency with religious broadcaster WLPV-LP (now at 97.3), with WMCB-LP broadcasting from noon to midnight and WLPV-LP broadcasting from midnight to noon. This ended in the winter of 2020, when WLPV-LP moved to its own frequency and began full 24-hour operations.

The station was assigned the WMCB-LP call letters by the Federal Communications Commission on July 7, 2006.

In December of 2025 GCTV applied to the FCC and was approved a location move from the Sandri warehouse on Chapman Street to the roof of their own building at 393 Main Street. That work was completed in May of 2026. With new equipment, their broadcast footprint expanded to cover all of Greenfield (for the first time since going on the air in 2008) and reach into all bordering communities.

== See also ==
- List of community radio stations in the United States
