= WLDV =

- Frederiksted, U.S. Virgin Islands; United States
- Broadcast area: U.S. Virgin Islands
- Frequency: 107.9 MHz
- Branding: Da Vybe

Programming
- Format: Mainstream Urban

Ownership
- Owner: Creative Minds, LLC

History
- Call sign meaning: Love; Da; Vybe

Technical information
- Licensing authority: FCC
- Facility ID: 18332
- Class: A
- ERP: 3,000 watts
- HAAT: 319 meters
- Transmitter coordinates: 17°44′51″N 64°50′11″W

Links
- Public license information: Public file; LMS
- Website: www.davybe.com

WLDV (107.9 FM) is a radio station broadcasting a Mainstream Urban format. Licensed to Frederiksted, U.S. Virgin Islands, the station is currently owned by Creative Minds, LLC.
