= WLPV-LP =

- Greenfield, Massachusetts; United States
- Broadcast area: Pioneer Valley
- Frequency: 97.3 MHz
- Branding: Radio 97.3

Programming
- Format: Christian

Ownership
- Owner: Living Waters Assembly Of God

History
- First air date: 2005
- Former frequencies: 107.9 MHz (2005–2020)

Technical information
- Licensing authority: FCC
- Facility ID: 132955
- Class: L1
- ERP: 100 watts
- HAAT: −10.6 meters (−35 ft)
- Transmitter coordinates: 42°36′28″N 72°35′57″W

Links
- Public license information: LMS
- Webcast: Listen live
- Website: lwaog.net/radio-97-3/

WLPV-LP (97.3 FM) is a radio station licensed to serve Greenfield, Massachusetts. The station is owned by Living Waters Assembly Of God. It airs a Christian radio format.

The station was assigned the WLPV-LP call letters by the Federal Communications Commission on October 19, 2005.

When WLPV-LP launched they shared the 107.9 MHz frequency with community broadcaster WMCB-LP. WMCB-LP broadcast from noon to midnight while WLPV-LP aired from midnight to noon. WLPV-LP moved to 97.3 in the winter of 2020 and began broadcasting 24 hours a day.
