= KOXC-LP =

Radio station in Oxnard, California

- Oxnard, California; United States
- Broadcast area: Oxnard, California
- Frequency: 107.9 MHz
- Branding: Radio Oasis

Programming
- Language: Spanish
- Format: Spanish Christian

Ownership
- Owner: Centro Evangélico Emmanuel, Inc.

History
- First air date: 2014

Technical information
- Licensing authority: FCC
- Facility ID: 196712
- Class: L1
- ERP: 100 watts
- HAAT: −8 meters (−26 ft)
- Transmitter coordinates: 34°11′14.00″N 119°8′22.00″W

Links
- Public license information: LMS
- Website: Radio Oasis

KOXC-LP (107.9 MHz, "Radio Oasis") is a low-power FM non-commercial educational radio station licensed to Oxnard, California. The station is owned by Centro Evangélico Emmanuel, Inc. and airs Spanish-language Christian programming.
