= KMCR-LP =

- Moorpark, California; United States
- Broadcast area: Moorpark, California
- Frequency: 107.9 MHz

Ownership
- Owner: Ventura County Community College District

History
- First air date: 2007
- Former call signs: KNJR-LP (2006–2023)
- Call sign meaning: Moorpark College Radio

Technical information
- Licensing authority: FCC
- Facility ID: 123947
- Class: L1
- ERP: 100 watts
- HAAT: −10 meters (−33 ft)
- Transmitter coordinates: 34°12′2.00″N 118°52′51.00″W

Links
- Public license information: LMS

KMCR-LP (107.9 FM) was the Campus radio station of Moorpark College. Prior to being acquired by the Ventura County Community College District, it had broadcast religious and J-pop formats.

The station had broadcast a freeform presentation, with programs hosted by students in Film, Television and Media Arts (FTMA) courses As of February 2024, KMCR-LP was airing dead air. On July 26, 2024 the Ventura County Community College District turned the license into the FCC. as of April 7th, 2025 There license got reinstated by the FCC

The Federal Communications Commission cancelled the station’s license on August 1, 2024.

== History ==
The initial construction permit for KNJR-LP was issued to Calvary Community Church, a nondemoniational church in Westlake Village, California, by the Federal Communications Commission on November 19, 2004. On November 6, 2007, the church transferred the license to Conejo Radio Ministries, who started broadcasting soon after.

On May 13, 2021, Conejo announced that the station would shut down, citing that the format was "no longer viable" for the format to continue after 14 years in operation. KNJR-LP went silent as a result. KOXC-LP in Oxnard then had an extended coverage area until November 2021, when KNJR-LP returned to the air to simulcast KBUU HD3, branded as J1 HD.

On October 31, 2022, KNJR-LP filed with the FCC to move its tower site from Thousand Oaks to Moorpark; the station was licensed to serve Moorpark effective December 13, 2022.

On March 1, 2023, Conejo Radio Ministries filed to transfer KNJR-LP's license to Ventura County Community College District. Ahead of the acquisition, J1 announced that it would vacate the frequency and work cooperatively to transition listeners to its webcast and KBUU-HD3, where J1 continues to broadcast. On April 14, 2023, the FCC approved the acquisition, with the sale being completed on April 15. Upon the closure of the acquisition, the station promptly changed to a freeform college radio format, first branded as Raiders Radio, and later rebranding to KMCR. As part of the new brand, the callsign was changed to KMCR-LP on October 11, 2023.
