= KGCE-LP =

- Modesto, California; United States
- Frequency: 107.9 MHz
- Branding: GraceRadio

Ownership
- Owner: Grace Orthodox Presbyterian Church of Modesto, CA

History
- First air date: February 20, 2014
- Former frequencies: 106.1 MHz (2015–2016)

Technical information
- Licensing authority: FCC
- Facility ID: 194780
- Class: L1
- ERP: 100 watts
- HAAT: 22 meters (72 ft)
- Transmitter coordinates: 37°41′21.4″N 121°1′0.8″W

Links
- Public license information: LMS
- Webcast: Listen live
- Website: graceradio.net

KGCE-LP (107.9 FM, "Grace Radio") is a low power radio station licensed to Modesto, California, United States, broadcasting a Reformed Christian radio format. KGCE airs local preaching broadcasts from Grace Church of Modesto as well as Christian religious music from artists such as Shane & Shane, Ellie Holcomb, and Sovereign Grace Music.

On September 16, 2016, KGCE-LP was granted a Federal Communications Commission construction permit to move its antenna 125 feet west northwest of the current location. Effective radiated power will remain 100 watts and the height above average terrain will increase to 25.1 meters.

== History ==
KGCE-LP began internet streaming on June 20, 2014. Full-time, 24/7 FM broadcasting began on June 2, 2015.
