= KJCR-LP =

Radio station in Grants Pass, Oregon

- Grants Pass, Oregon; United States
- Broadcast area: Grants Pass
- Frequency: 107.9 MHz

Programming
- Format: Religious

Ownership
- Owner: His Mercy Radio, Inc.

Technical information
- Licensing authority: FCC
- Facility ID: 135682
- Class: L1
- ERP: 50 watts
- HAAT: −62 meters (−203 ft)
- Transmitter coordinates: 42°27′46.6″N 123°22′47.8″W

Links
- Public license information: LMS

KJCR-LP (107.9 FM) is a radio station licensed to Grants Pass, Oregon, United States. The station is owned by His Mercy Radio, Inc.

It has been granted a U.S. Federal Communications Commission (FCC) construction permit to increase to 100 watts ERP and decrease HAAT to -134 meters.
