= KSEA (FM) =

- Greenfield, California; United States
- Broadcast area: Santa Cruz/Salinas, California
- Frequency: 107.9 MHz
- Branding: La Campesina 107.9 FM

Programming
- Format: Regional Mexican

Ownership
- Owner: Chavez Radio Group

History
- First air date: 1998
- Former call signs: KRGF (1989; KQKZ (1989–1991)

Technical information
- Licensing authority: FCC
- Facility ID: 68169
- Class: B1
- ERP: 870 watts
- HAAT: 499 meters (1,637 ft)
- Transmitter coordinates: 36°23′00″N 121°25′40″W

Links
- Public license information: Public file; LMS
- Webcast: Listen Live
- Website: campesina.com/

KSEA (107.9 MHz, "La Campesina 107.9 FM") is an American FM radio station licensed to serve the community of Greenfield, California, since 1998. The station's broadcast license is held by Chavez Radio Group.

== Programming ==
KSEA broadcasts a Regional Mexican music and educational programming format branded as "La Campesina 107.9 FM" as part of the Radio Campesina Network. ("Campesina" is a Spanish word meaning "peasant" or "farmworker"). Anthony Chavez, president of Farmworker Educational Radio Network, Inc., is the youngest son of American farm worker, labor leader, and civil rights activist César Chávez.

== History ==
In July 1985, Q Prime Inc. applied to the Federal Communications Commission (FCC) for a construction permit for a new broadcast radio station. The FCC granted this permit on May 31, 1989, with a scheduled expiration date of November 30, 1990. The new station was assigned the call sign of "KRGF" on November 29, 1989, but this was changed that same day to "KQKZ."

In November 1989, permit holder Q Prime Inc., applied to transfer the KQKZ permit to the Troposphere Broadcasting Limited Partnership. The FCC approved the move on December 5, 1989, and the transaction was completed on January 30, 1990. At the new owner's request, the station was assigned the new call sign "KSEA" on May 15, 1991. A significantly delayed, ultimately denied engineering request and several extensions pushed completion of the station well into the 1990s.

In January 1997, Troposphere Broadcasting L.P. reached an agreement to sell the permit to build KSEA to Farmworker Educational Radio Network, Inc. The deal gained FCC approval on March 13, 1997, and formal consummation of the transaction took place on June 11, 1997. After more engineering changes, construction and testing were completed in September 1998, and the station was granted its broadcast license on December 4, 1998.
