= WIMM-LP =

- Owensboro, Kentucky; United States
- Frequency: 107.9 MHz
- Branding: Savior Radio Network

Programming
- Format: Catholic Religious
- Affiliations: EWTN Radio

Ownership
- Owner: Trinity Educational Radio Association

Technical information
- Licensing authority: FCC
- Facility ID: 135195
- Class: L1
- ERP: 100 watts
- HAAT: 27.8 meters
- Transmitter coordinates: 37°43′39.00″N 87°3′15.00″W

Links
- Public license information: LMS
- Webcast: WIMM-LP Webstream
- Website: WIMM-LP Online

WIMM-LP (107.9 FM) is a Catholic Religious radio station licensed to Owensboro, Kentucky, United States. The station is currently owned by Trinity Educational Radio Association.
