= KTIC-FM =

- West Point, Nebraska; United States
- Broadcast area: Norfolk, Nebraska; Sioux City, Iowa
- Frequency: 107.9 MHz
- Branding: 107.9 The Bull

Programming
- Language: English
- Format: Country music

Ownership
- Owner: Nebraska Rural Radio Association
- Sister stations: KTIC (AM)

History
- Former call signs: KWPN-FM (1988–2007)

Technical information
- Licensing authority: FCC
- Facility ID: 33881
- Class: C2
- ERP: 33,000 watts
- HAAT: 182 meters (597 ft)
- Transmitter coordinates: 41°52′53″N 97°0′59.1″W

Links
- Public license information: Public file; LMS
- Webcast: Listen live
- Website: ruralradio.com/ktic/

KTIC-FM (107.9 MHz) is a radio station broadcasting a country music format. Like its sister AM station KTIC it is licensed to West Point, Nebraska. The station serves the Norfolk area, which is part of the Sioux City, Iowa, market. KTIC-FM is owned by Nebraska Rural Radio Association. KTIC-FM is a country music station, known commonly as "107.9 The Bull".

== History ==
KTIC-FM first signed on the air on August 1, 1988, under the original call sign KWPN-FM. Founded by David and Sharon Kelly of Kelly Communications, the station initially broadcast with 3,000 watts of power and featured an Adult Contemporary format. The station later transitioned to a country music format and adopted its current call sign, KTIC-FM, on July 2, 2007, to better align with its sister AM station.

Throughout the 1990s, the station underwent several power increases to expand its reach across eastern Nebraska and the Sioux City, Iowa market. In 1995, its power was boosted to 50,000 watts, and it eventually upgraded to its current Class C2 status, operating with an Effective Radiated Power (ERP) of 33,000 watts. In 2006, the station moved to a new tower located approximately 19 miles northwest of West Point, which improved its signal strength in Norfolk while slightly reducing coverage to the south in Fremont. In August 1997, Kelly Communications sold both the AM and FM stations to the Nebraska Rural Radio Association (NRRA) for $1.5 million. This sale integrated the station into a unique farmer-owned cooperative network. Branded as "107.9 The Bull," the station currently provides a mix of contemporary country music and rural-focused information as an affiliate of Cumulus Media Networks.
