= List of FM radio stations in the United States by call sign (initial letters KW–KZ) =

This is a list of FM radio stations in the United States having call signs beginning with the letters KW through KZ. Low-power FM radio stations, those with designations such as KWAH-LP, have not been included in this list.

== KW-- ==
Callsign	Frequency	City of license
KWAA	88.9 FM	Mart, Texas
KWAI	97.7 FM	Los Altos, California
KWAK-FM	105.5 FM	Stuttgart, Arkansas
KWAO	88.1 FM	Vashon, Washington
KWAR	89.1 FM	Waverly, Iowa
KWAS	88.1 FM	Borger, Texas
KWAV	96.9 FM	Monterey, California
KWAW	100.3 FM	Garapan, Northern Mariana Islands
KWAX	91.1 FM	Eugene, Oregon
KWAY-FM	99.3 FM	Waverly, Iowa
KWBB	104.5 FM	Upton, Wyoming
KWBL	106.7 FM	Denver, Colorado
KWBP	90.3 FM	Big Pine, California
KWBT	94.5 FM	Waco, Texas
KWBU-FM	103.3 FM	Waco, Texas
KWBY-FM	98.5 FM	Ranger, Texas
KWBZ	107.5 FM	Monroe City, Missouri
KWCA	101.1 FM	Weaverville, California
KWCC-FM	89.5 FM	Woodland Park, Colorado
KWCD	92.3 FM	Bisbee, Arizona
KWCF	89.3 FM	Sheridan, Wyoming
KWCK-FM	99.9 FM	Searcy, Arkansas
KWCL-FM	96.7 FM	Oak Grove, Louisiana
KWCN	89.9 FM	Pinedale, Wyoming
KWCO-FM	105.5 FM	Chickasha, Oklahoma
KWCQ	106.1 FM	Condon, Oregon
KWCV	88.9 FM	Walnut Ridge, Arkansas
KWCW	90.5 FM	Walla Walla, Washington
KWCX-FM	104.9 FM	Tanque Verde, Arizona
KWDD	94.3 FM	Fairbanks, Alaska
KWDJ-FM	100.9 FM	Johannesburg, California
KWDM	88.7 FM	West Des Moines, Iowa
KWDO	105.5 FM	San Joaquin, California
KWDQ	102.3 FM	Woodward, Oklahoma
KWEN	95.5 FM	Tulsa, Oklahoma
KWES-FM	93.5 FM	Ruidoso, New Mexico
KWEY-FM	95.5 FM	Clinton, Oklahoma
KWFB	100.9 FM	Quanah, Texas
KWFC	89.1 FM	Springfield, Missouri
KWFF	99.7 FM	Mustang, Oklahoma
KWFG-FM	106.5 FM	Knox City, Texas
KWFH	90.1 FM	Parker, Arizona
KWFI-FM	96.1 FM	Aberdeen, Idaho
KWFJ	89.7 FM	Roy, Washington
KWFL	99.5 FM	Roswell, New Mexico
KWFN	97.3 FM	San Diego, California
KWFO-FM	102.1 FM	Driggs, Idaho
KWFR	101.9 FM	San Angelo, Texas
KWFS-FM	102.3 FM	Wichita Falls, Texas
KWFX	100.1 FM	Woodward, Oklahoma
KWGB	97.9 FM	Colby, Kansas
KWGF	101.7 FM	Vaughn, Montana
KWGL	105.7 FM	Ouray, Colorado
KWGO	102.9 FM	Burlington, North Dakota
KWGS	89.5 FM	Tulsa, Oklahoma
KWHA	89.9 FM	West Helena, Arkansas
KWHF	95.9 FM	Harrisburg, Arkansas
KWHK	95.9 FM	Hutchinson, Kansas
KWHL	106.5 FM	Anchorage, Alaska
KWHO	107.1 FM	Lovell, Wyoming
KWHQ-FM	100.1 FM	Kenai, Alaska
KWHT	103.5 FM	Pendleton, Oregon
KWIA	100.9 FM	Newell, Iowa
KWIC	99.3 FM	Topeka, Kansas
KWID	101.9 FM	Las Vegas, Nevada
KWIE	101.3 FM	Hinkley, California
KWIM	104.9 FM	Window Rock, Arizona
KWIN	97.7 FM	Lodi, California
KWIQ-FM	100.5 FM	Moses Lake, Washington
KWIS	88.3 FM	Plummer, Idaho
KWIT	90.3 FM	Sioux City, Iowa
KWIX-FM	92.5 FM	Cairo, Missouri
KWIZ	96.7 FM	Santa Ana, California
KWJC	91.9 FM	Liberty, Missouri
KWJJ-FM	99.5 FM	Portland, Oregon
KWJK	93.1 FM	Boonville, Missouri
KWJP	89.7 FM	Paola, Kansas
KWKJ	98.5 FM	Windsor, Missouri
KWKK	100.9 FM	Russellville, Arkansas
KWKL	89.9 FM	Grandfield, Oklahoma
KWKM	95.7 FM	Saint Johns, Arizona
KWKN	95.3 FM	Wakeeney, Kansas
KWKQ	94.7 FM	Graham, Texas
KWKR	99.9 FM	Leoti, Kansas
KWKZ	106.1 FM	Charleston, Missouri
KWLA	103.1 FM	Anacoco, Louisiana
KWLB	93.1 FM	Red Oak, Oklahoma
KWLD	91.5 FM	Plainview, Texas
KWLF	98.1 FM	Fairbanks, Alaska
KWLK	88.5 FM	Westwood, California
KWLL-FM	106.7 FM	Rayne, Louisiana
KWLN	103.3 FM	Wilson Creek, Washington
KWLP	100.9 FM	Peach Springs, Arizona
KWLR	96.9 FM	Bigelow, Arkansas
KWLS	107.9 FM	Winfield, Kansas
KWLT	102.7 FM	North Crossett, Arkansas
KWLU	98.9 FM	Chester, California
KWLV	107.1 FM	Many, Louisiana
KWLZ	99.3 FM	Shasta Lake City, California
KWME	92.7 FM	Wellington, Kansas
KWMJ	100.7 FM	Cotulla, Texas
KWMN	99.3 FM	Rushford, Minnesota
KWMR	90.5 FM	Point Reyes Station, California
KWMU	90.7 FM	St. Louis, Missouri
KWMV	88.5 FM	Mountain View, Arkansas
KWMW	105.1 FM	Maljamar, New Mexico
KWMX	96.7 FM	Williams, Arizona
KWMY	105.9 FM	Joliet, Montana
KWMZ-FM	104.5 FM	Empire, Louisiana
KWNA-FM	92.7 FM	Winnemucca, Nevada
KWND	88.3 FM	Springfield, Missouri
KWNE	94.5 FM	Ukiah, California
KWNG	105.9 FM	Red Wing, Minnesota
KWNN	98.3 FM	Turlock, California
KWNQ	93.3 FM	Quinhagak, Alaska
KWNR	95.5 FM	Henderson, Nevada
KWNS	104.7 FM	Winnsboro, Texas
KWNW	101.9 FM	Crawfordsville, Arkansas
KWNZ	106.3 FM	Lovelock, Nevada
KWOF	106.3 FM	Waukomis, Oklahoma
KWOL-FM	105.1 FM	Whitefish, Montana
KWOU	88.1 FM	Woodward, Oklahoma
KWOW	104.1 FM	Clifton, Texas
KWOX	101.1 FM	Woodward, Oklahoma
KWOZ	103.3 FM	Mountain View, Arkansas
KWPK-FM	104.1 FM	Sisters, Oregon
KWPR	88.7 FM	Lund, Nevada
KWPS-FM	99.7 FM	Caddo Valley, Arkansas
KWPT	100.3 FM	Fortuna, California
KWPU	88.5 FM	Oskaloosa, Iowa
KWPV	104.5 FM	Wynnewood, Oklahoma
KWPW	107.9 FM	Robinson, Texas
KWPZ	106.5 FM	Lynden, Washington
KWQR	92.5 FM	Willcox, Arizona
KWQW	98.3 FM	Boone, Iowa
KWQX	91.9 FM	Perryville, Arkansas
KWRB	90.9 FM	Bisbee, Arizona
KWRC	90.9 FM	Hermosa, South Dakota
KWRD-FM	100.7 FM	Highland Village, Texas
KWRF-FM	105.5 FM	Warren, Arkansas
KWRK	96.1 FM	Window Rock, Arizona
KWRL	102.3 FM	La Grande, Oregon
KWRQ	102.3 FM	Clifton, Arizona
KWRV	91.9 FM	Sun Valley, Idaho
KWRX	88.5 FM	Redmond, Oregon
KWRY	106.9 FM	Pueblo, Colorado
KWRZ	92.3 FM	Canyonville, Oregon
KWSA	100.1 FM	Price, Utah
KWSB-FM	91.1 FM	Gunnison, Colorado
KWSC	91.9 FM	Wayne, Nebraska
KWSO	91.9 FM	Warm Springs, Oregon
KWTB	92.3 FM	Alakanuk, Alaska
KWTD	91.9 FM	Ridgecrest, California
KWTF	88.1 FM	Bodega Bay, California
KWTG	104.7 FM	Vidalia, Louisiana
KWTH	91.3 FM	Barstow, California
KWTN	100.9 FM	Allen, Nebraska
KWTO-FM	101.3 FM	Buffalo, Missouri
KWTS	91.1 FM	Canyon, Texas
KWTU	88.7 FM	Tulsa, Oklahoma
KWTW	88.5 FM	Bishop, California
KWTX-FM	97.5 FM	Waco, Texas
KWTY	94.5 FM	Cartago, California
KWUF-FM	106.1 FM	Pagosa Springs, Colorado
KWUP	92.5 FM	Navasota, Texas
KWUR	90.3 FM	Clayton, Missouri
KWUT	97.7 FM	Elsinore, Utah
KWUZ	97.5 FM	Poncha Springs, Colorado
KWVA	88.1 FM	Eugene, Oregon
KWVE-FM	107.9 FM	San Clemente, California
KWVF	102.7 FM	Guerneville, California
KWVI	88.9 FM	Waverly, Iowa
KWVN-FM	107.7 FM	Pendleton, Oregon
KWVR-FM	92.1 FM	Enterprise, Oregon
KWVV-FM	103.5 FM	Homer, Alaska
KWVZ	91.5 FM	Florence, Oregon
KWWD	91.3 FM	Canadian, Texas
KWWK	96.5 FM	Rochester, Minnesota
KWWM	91.3 FM	Rock Springs, Wyoming
KWWR	95.7 FM	Mexico, Missouri
KWWS	89.7 FM	Walla Walla, Washington
KWWV	106.1 FM	Santa Margarita, California
KWWW-FM	96.7 FM	Quincy, Washington
KWWY	106.5 FM	Shoshoni, Wyoming
KWXC	88.9 FM	Grove, Oklahoma
KWXD	103.5 FM	Asbury, Missouri
KWXM	102.3 FM	Simsboro, Louisiana
KWXS	107.7 FM	Prineville, Oregon
KWXW	93.7 FM	Kermit, Texas
KWXX-FM	94.7 FM	Hilo, Hawaii
KWYC	90.3 FM	Orchard Valley, Wyoming
KWYD	101.1 FM	Parma, Idaho
KWYE	101.1 FM	Fresno, California
KWYI	106.9 FM	Kawaihae, Hawaii
KWYK-FM	94.9 FM	Aztec, New Mexico
KWYL	102.9 FM	South Lake Tahoe, California
KWYN-FM	92.5 FM	Wynne, Arkansas
KWYR-FM	93.7 FM	Winner, South Dakota
KWYU	96.9 FM	Christine, Texas
KWYW	99.1 FM	Lost Cabin, Wyoming
KWYX	93.5 FM	Casper, Wyoming
KWYY	95.5 FM	Midwest, Wyoming

== KX-- ==
Callsign	Frequency	City of license
KXAA	100.3 FM	Cle Elum, Washington
KXAC	100.5 FM	Saint James, Minnesota
KXAF	97.9 FM	George West, Texas
KXAI	103.7 FM	Odem, Texas
KXAM	102.5 FM	San Diego, Texas
KXAZ	93.3 FM	Page, Arizona
KXBA	93.3 FM	Nikiski, Alaska
KXBB	101.7 FM	Cienega Springs, Arizona
KXBG	97.9 FM	Cheyenne, Wyoming
KXBJ	96.9 FM	El Campo, Texas
KXBL	99.5 FM	Henryetta, Oklahoma
KXBN	92.1 FM	Cedar City, Utah
KXBR	91.9 FM	International Falls, Minnesota
KXBS	95.5 FM	Bethalto, Illinois
KXBT	88.1 FM	Somerville, Texas
KXBX-FM	98.3 FM	Lakeport, California
KXBZ	104.7 FM	Manhattan, Kansas
KXCD	93.5 FM	Fairfield, Idaho
KXCI	91.3 FM	Tucson, Arizona
KXCL	101.7 FM	Rock Creek Park, Colorado
KXCM	96.3 FM	Joshua Tree, California
KXCR	90.7 FM	Florence, Oregon
KXCS	105.5 FM	Coahoma, Texas
KXCV	90.5 FM	Maryville, Missouri
KXDD	104.1 FM	Yakima, Washington
KXDG	97.9 FM	Webb City, Missouri
KXDI	93.9 FM	Belfield, North Dakota
KXDJ	98.3 FM	Spearman, Texas
KXDL	99.7 FM	Browerville, Minnesota
KXDR	106.7 FM	Pinesdale, Montana
KXDZ	100.5 FM	Templeton, California
KXEA	104.9 FM	Lowry City, Missouri
KXEH	88.7 FM	Victor, Montana
KXEI	95.1 FM	Havre, Montana
KXEM	88.1 FM	Roundup, Montana
KXEU	95.5 FM	Ballard, Utah
KXEZ	92.1 FM	Farmersville, Texas
KXFC	105.5 FM	Coalgate, Oklahoma
KXFE	106.9 FM	Dumas, Arkansas
KXFG	92.9 FM	Sun City, California
KXFM	99.1 FM	Santa Maria, California
KXFR	91.9 FM	Socorro, New Mexico
KXFS	93.7 FM	Rankin, Texas
KXFT	99.7 FM	Manson, Iowa
KXGA	90.5 FM	Glennallen, Alaska
KXGE	102.3 FM	Dubuque, Iowa
KXGL	100.9 FM	Amarillo, Texas
KXGM	89.1 FM	Hiawatha, Iowa
KXGO	99.5 FM	Willow Creek, California
KXGR	89.7 FM	Loveland, Colorado
KXGT	98.3 FM	Carrington, North Dakota
KXHM	106.1 FM	Refugio, Texas
KXHT	107.1 FM	Marion, Arkansas
KXIA	101.1 FM	Marshalltown, Iowa
KXIM	98.3 FM	Sanborn, Iowa
KXIN	100.9 FM	Wagner, South Dakota
KXIO	106.9 FM	Clarksville, Arkansas
KXIR	89.9 FM	Freeland, Washington
KXIX	94.1 FM	Sunriver, Oregon
KXJM	107.5 FM	Banks, Oregon
KXJN	97.7 FM	Moose Wilson Road, Wyoming
KXJO	92.1 FM	St. Maries, Idaho
KXJR	96.1 FM	Chama, New Mexico
KXJS	88.7 FM	Sutter, California
KXJT	88.3 FM	Rio Grande City, Texas
KXJZ	90.9 FM	Sacramento, California
KXKC	99.1 FM	New Iberia, Louisiana
KXKK	92.5 FM	Park Rapids, Minnesota
KXKL-FM	105.1 FM	Denver, Colorado
KXKM	89.7 FM	McCarthy, Alaska
KXKQ	94.3 FM	Safford, Arizona
KXKR	101.7 FM	Catalina Foothills, Arizona
KXKS-FM	93.7 FM	Shreveport, Louisiana
KXKT	103.7 FM	Glenwood, Iowa
KXKU	106.1 FM	Lyons, Kansas
KXKX	105.7 FM	Knob Noster, Missouri
KXKZ	107.5 FM	Ruston, Louisiana
KXL-FM	101.1 FM	Portland, Oregon
KXLB	100.7 FM	Churchill, Montana
KXLC	91.1 FM	La Crescent, Minnesota
KXLE-FM	95.3 FM	Ellensburg, Washington
KXLG	99.1 FM	Milbank, South Dakota
KXLI	94.5 FM	Moapa, Nevada
KXLL	100.7 FM	Juneau, Alaska
KXLM	102.9 FM	Oxnard, California
KXLP	94.1 FM	Eagle Lake, Minnesota
KXLR	95.9 FM	Fairbanks, Alaska
KXLS	95.7 FM	Lahoma, Oklahoma
KXLT-FM	107.9 FM	Eagle, Idaho
KXLU	88.9 FM	Los Angeles
KXLV	89.1 FM	Amarillo, Texas
KXLW	96.3 FM	Houston, Alaska
KXLY-FM	99.9 FM	Spokane, Washington
KXMO-FM	95.3 FM	Owensville, Missouri
KXMS	88.7 FM	Joplin, Missouri
KXMT	99.1 FM	Taos, New Mexico
KXMX	105.1 FM	Muldrow, Oklahoma
KXMZ	102.7 FM	Box Elder, South Dakota
KXNA	104.9 FM	Springdale, Arkansas
KXNC	104.7 FM	Ness City, Kansas
KXNE-FM	89.3 FM	Norfolk, Nebraska
KXNG	91.3 FM	Lexington, Nebraska
KXNM	88.7 FM	Encino, New Mexico
KXNO-FM	106.3 FM	Ankeny, Iowa
KXNP	103.5 FM	North Platte, Nebraska
KXNZ	98.9 FM	Wheeler, Texas
KXO-FM	107.5 FM	El Centro, California
KXOJ-FM	94.1 FM	Glenpool, Oklahoma
KXOL-FM	96.3 FM	Los Angeles
KXOO	94.3 FM	Elk City, Oklahoma
KXOQ	104.3 FM	Kennett, Missouri
KXOT	106.3 FM	Los Lunas, New Mexico
KXOX-FM	96.7 FM	Sweetwater, Texas
KXPK	96.5 FM	Evergreen, Colorado
KXPR	88.9 FM	Sacramento, California
KXPT	97.1 FM	Las Vegas, Nevada
KXPZ	99.5 FM	Las Cruces, New Mexico
KXQJ	90.1 FM	Clarksville, Texas
KXQQ-FM	100.5 FM	Henderson, Nevada
KXQT	105.9 FM	Stanton, Texas
KXQX	92.3	Tusayan, Arizona
KXRA-FM	92.3 FM	Alexandria, Minnesota
KXRB-FM	100.1 FM	Brandon, South Dakota
KXRC	105.3 FM	Durango, Colorado
KXRD	96.7 FM	Fayetteville, Arkansas
KXRI	91.9 FM	Amarillo, Texas
KXRJ	91.9 FM	Russellville, Arkansas
KXRK	96.3 FM	Provo, Utah
KXRP	91.3 FM	Bismarck, North Dakota
KXRQ	94.3 FM	Roosevelt, Utah
KXRR	106.1 FM	Monroe, Louisiana
KXRS	105.7 FM	Hemet, California
KXRT	90.9 FM	Idabel, Oklahoma
KXRV	107.5 FM	Cannon Ball, North Dakota
KXRX	97.1 FM	Walla Walla, Washington
KXRY	91.1 FM	Portland, Oregon
KXRZ	99.3 FM	Alexandria, Minnesota
KXSA-FM	103.1 FM	Dermott, Arkansas
KXSB	101.7 FM	Big Bear Lake, California
KXSC	104.9 FM	Sunnyvale, California
KXSE	104.3 FM	Davis, California
KXSM	93.1 FM	Chualar, California
KXSN	98.1 FM	San Diego, California
KXSR	91.7 FM	Groveland, California
KXSS-FM	96.9 FM	Amarillo, Texas
KXSW	89.9 FM	Sisseton, South Dakota
KXTA-FM	99.1 FM	Gooding, Idaho
KXTC	99.9 FM	Thoreau, New Mexico
KXTE	107.5 FM	Pahrump, Nevada
KXTH	89.1 FM	Seminole, Oklahoma
KXTM	94.3 FM	Benavides, Texas
KXTQ	106.5 FM	Lubbock, Texas
KXTS	98.7 FM	Geyserville, California
KXTT	94.9 FM	Maricopa, California
KXTZ	95.3 FM	Pismo Beach, California
KXUA	88.3 FM	Fayetteville, Arkansas
KXUL	91.1 FM	Monroe, Louisiana
KXUS	97.3 FM	Springfield, Missouri
KXUW	89.9 FM	Alta, Wyoming
KXVB	101.5 FM	Greenland, Arkansas
KXVV	103.1 FM	Victorville, California
KXWA	101.9 FM	Centennial, Colorado
KXWB	88.9 FM	Nipomo, California
KXWI	98.5 FM	Williston, North Dakota
KXWT	91.3 FM	Odessa, Texas
KXWX	93.7 FM	Mohave Valley, Arizona
KXWY	102.9 FM	Hudson, Wyoming
KXXE	92.5 FM	San Augustine, Texas
KXXF	106.5 FM	Springer, New Mexico
KXXI	93.7 FM	Gallup, New Mexico
KXXK	95.3 FM	Hoquiam, Washington
KXXL	106.1 FM	Moorcroft, Wyoming
KXXM	96.1 FM	San Antonio, Texas
KXXN	97.5 FM	Iowa Park, Texas
KXXO	96.1 FM	Olympia, Washington
KXXQ	100.7 FM	Milan, New Mexico
KXXR	93.7 FM	Minneapolis, Minnesota
KXXU	104.3 FM	Santa Anna, Texas
KXXY-FM	96.1 FM	Oklahoma City, Oklahoma
KXXZ	95.9 FM	Barstow, California
KXYL-FM	102.3 FM	Coleman, Texas
KXZK	103.7 FM	Vail, Arizona
KXZM	93.7 FM	Felton, California
KXZT	107.9 FM	Newell, South Dakota
KXZZ	100.1 FM	Dayton, Nevada

== KY-- ==
Callsign	Frequency	City of license
KYAC	90.1 FM	Mill City, Oregon
KYAI	89.3 FM	McKee, Kentucky
KYAL-FM	97.1 FM	Muskogee, Oklahoma
KYAP	96.9 FM	Centennial, Wyoming
KYAQ	91.7 FM	Siletz, Oregon
KYAR	98.3 FM	Lorena, Texas
KYAT	94.5 FM	Gallup, New Mexico
KYAY	91.1 FM	San Carlos, Arizona
KYBA	105.3 FM	Stewartville, Minnesota
KYBB	102.7 FM	Canton, South Dakota
KYBE	95.7 FM	Frederick, Oklahoma
KYBF	90.1 FM	Scottsbluff, Nebraska
KYBG	102.1 FM	Basile, Louisiana
KYBI	100.1 FM	Lufkin, Texas
KYBR	92.9 FM	Espanola, New Mexico
KYBU	96.9 FM	Covelo, California
KYCC	90.1 FM	Stockton, California
KYCH-FM	97.1 FM	Portland, Oregon
KYCK	97.1 FM	Crookston, Minnesota
KYCL-FM	88.9 FM	Clarendon, Texas
KYCM	89.9 FM	Alamogordo, New Mexico
KYCS	95.1 FM	Rock Springs, Wyoming
KYCT	92.7 FM	Shasta Lake, California
KYDA	101.7 FM	Azle, Texas
KYDN	95.3 FM	Monte Vista, Colorado
KYDO	96.1 FM	Campo, California
KYDS	91.5 FM	Sacramento, California
KYDT	103.1 FM	Pine Haven, Wyoming
KYEC	88.3 FM	Doniphan, Missouri
KYEE	94.3 FM	Alamogordo, New Mexico
KYEJ	90.1 FM	Fairmont, Minnesota
KYEL	105.5 FM	Danville, Arkansas
KYEZ	93.7 FM	Salina, Kansas
KYFA-FM	91.5 FM	Ginger, Texas
KYFB	91.5 FM	Denison, Texas
KYFG	88.9 FM	Omaha, Nebraska
KYFJ	93.7 FM	New Iberia, Louisiana
KYFL	89.5 FM	Monroe, Louisiana
KYFM	100.1 FM	Bartlesville, Oklahoma
KYFO-FM	95.5 FM	Ogden, Utah
KYFP	89.1 FM	Palestine, Texas
KYFQ	91.7 FM	Tacoma, Washington
KYFS	90.9 FM	San Antonio, Texas
KYFV	107.1 FM	Armijo, New Mexico
KYFW	88.3 FM	Wichita, Kansas
KYGL	106.3 FM	Texarkana, Arkansas
KYGO-FM	98.5 FM	Denver, Colorado
KYHD	94.7 FM	Valliant, Oklahoma
KYHK	89.5 FM	Kearney, Nebraska
KYIS	98.9 FM	Oklahoma City, Oklahoma
KYIX	104.9 FM	South Oroville, California
KYJC	91.3 FM	Commerce, Texas
KYJJ	94.1 FM	Boardman, Oregon
KYJK	105.9 FM	Missoula, Montana
KYKA	104.9 FM	Meadow Lakes, Alaska
KYKC	100.1 FM	Byng, Oklahoma
KYKD	100.1 FM	Bethel, Alaska
KYKK	93.5 FM	Junction, Texas
KYKL	90.7 FM	Tracy, California
KYKM	94.3 FM	Yoakum, Texas
KYKR	95.1 FM	Beaumont, Texas
KYKS	105.1 FM	Lufkin, Texas
KYKT	91.9 FM	Yakutat, Alaska
KYKV	103.1 FM	Selah, Washington
KYKX	105.7 FM	Longview, Texas
KYKY	98.1 FM	St. Louis, Missouri
KYKZ	96.1 FM	Lake Charles, Louisiana
KYLA	92.7 FM	Fountain Valley, California
KYLB	96.7 FM	Turkey, Texas
KYLC	90.3 FM	Lake Charles, Louisiana
KYLD	94.9 FM	San Francisco, California
KYLF	88.9 FM	Adrian, Missouri
KYLI	96.7 FM	Bunkerville, Nevada
KYLQ	99.7 FM	Encinal, Texas
KYLR	92.1 FM	Hutto, Texas
KYLS-FM	95.9 FM	Ironton, Missouri
KYLV	88.9 FM	Oklahoma City, Oklahoma
KYLZ	101.3 FM	Albuquerque, New Mexico
KYMG	98.9 FM	Anchorage, Alaska
KYMI	97.5 FM	Charlo, Montana
KYMK-FM	106.3 FM	Maurice, Louisiana
KYMO-FM	105.3 FM	East Prairie, Missouri
KYMR-FM	88.9 FM	Metlakatla, Alaska
KYMS	89.9 FM	Rathdrum, Idaho
KYMV	100.7 FM	Woodruff, Utah
KYMX	96.1 FM	Sacramento, California
KYMZ	99.9 FM	Somerton, Arizona
KYNU	95.5 FM	Jamestown, North Dakota
KYNZ	107.1 FM	Lone Grove, Oklahoma
KYOA	98.7 FM	Kiowa, Oklahoma
KYOE	102.3 FM	Point Arena, California
KYOL	91.7 FM	Chama, New Mexico
KYOO-FM	99.1 FM	Half Way, Missouri
KYOR	88.9 FM	Newport, Oregon
KYOT	95.5 FM	Phoenix, Arizona
KYOX	94.3 FM	Comanche, Texas
KYOY	92.3 FM	Hillsdale, Wyoming
KYPB	89.3 FM	Big Timber, Montana
KYPC	89.9 FM	Colstrip, Montana
KYPF	89.5 FM	Stanford, Montana
KYPH	88.5 FM	Helena, Montana
KYPL	91.1 FM	Yakima, Washington
KYPM	89.9 FM	Livingston, Montana
KYPR	90.7 FM	Miles City, Montana
KYPW	88.3 FM	Wolf Point, Montana
KYPX	106.5 FM	Helena Valley SE, Montana
KYPZ	96.1 FM	Fort Benton, Montana
KYQQ	106.5 FM	Arkansas City, Kansas
KYQX	89.5 FM	Weatherford, Texas
KYRK	106.5 FM	Taft, Texas
KYRM	91.9 FM	Yuma, Arizona
KYRN	102.1 FM	Socorro, New Mexico
KYRQ	90.3 FM	Natalia, Texas
KYRS	88.1 FM	Medical Lake, Washington
KYRT	97.7 FM	Hunt, Texas
KYRV	93.7 FM	Roseville, California
KYRX	97.3 FM	Marble Hill, Missouri
KYSA	88.3 FM	Sparks, Nevada
KYSC	96.9 FM	Fairbanks, Alaska
KYSD	91.9 FM	Spearfish, South Dakota
KYSE	94.7 FM	El Paso, Texas
KYSF	97.5 FM	Bonanza, Oregon
KYSK	88.7 FM	Ririe, Idaho
KYSL	93.9 FM	Frisco, Colorado
KYSM-FM	103.5 FM	Mankato, Minnesota
KYSN	97.7 FM	East Wenatchee, Washington
KYSO	88.7 FM	Selma, Oregon
KYSR	98.7 FM	Los Angeles
KYSS-FM	94.9 FM	Missoula, Montana
KYSX	105.1 FM	Billings, Montana
KYTC	102.7 FM	Northwood, Iowa
KYTE	105.5 FM	Garibaldi, Oregon
KYTI	93.7 FM	Sheridan, Wyoming
KYTM	99.3 FM	Corrigan, Texas
KYTN	104.9 FM	Union City, Tennessee
KYTO	96.1 FM	Shingletown, California
KYTR	88.1 FM	Union Gap, Washington
KYTT-FM	98.7 FM	Coos Bay, Oregon
KYTZ	106.7 FM	Walhalla, North Dakota
KYUA	88.5 FM	Inyokern, California
KYUK-FM	90.3 FM	Bethel, Alaska
KYUN	102.1 FM	Twin Falls, Idaho
KYUP	91.9 FM	Scammon Bay, Alaska
KYUS-FM	92.3 FM	Miles City, Montana
KYVA-FM	103.7 FM	Grants, New Mexico
KYVT	88.5 FM	Yakima, Washington
KYVZ	106.1 FM	Atwood, Kansas
KYWA	90.7 FM	Wichita, Kansas
KYWY	95.5 FM	Pine Bluffs, Wyoming
KYXA	106.7 FM	Homer, Louisiana
KYXE	104.9 FM	Union Gap, Washington
KYXK	106.9 FM	Gurdon, Arkansas
KYXX	94.3 FM	Ozona, Texas
KYXY	96.5 FM	San Diego, California
KYYI	104.7 FM	Burkburnett, Texas
KYYK	98.3 FM	Palestine, Texas
KYYO	96.9 FM	McCleary, Washington
KYYT	102.3 FM	Goldendale, Washington
KYYX	97.1 FM	Minot, North Dakota
KYYY	92.9 FM	Bismarck, North Dakota
KYYZ	96.1 FM	Williston, North Dakota
KYZA	92.7 FM	Adelanto, California
KYZK	107.5 FM	Sun Valley, Idaho

== KZ-- ==
Callsign	Frequency	City of license
KZAH	99.1 FM	Harper, Texas
KZAI	103.7 FM	Balcones Heights, Texas
KZAL	94.7 FM	Manson, Washington
KZAM	98.7 FM	Pleasant Valley, Texas
KZAN	91.7 FM	Hays, Kansas
KZAO	89.3 FM	Ajo, Arizona
KZAP	96.7 FM	Paradise, California
KZAR	97.7 FM	McQueeney, Texas
KZAT-FM	95.5 FM	Belle Plaine, Iowa
KZAZ	91.7 FM	Bellingham, Washington
KZBB	97.9 FM	Poteau, Oklahoma
KZBD	105.7 FM	Spokane, Washington
KZBE	104.3 FM	Omak, Washington
KZBG	97.7 FM	Lapwai, Idaho
KZBH	107.7 FM	Hico, Texas
KZBI	92.9 FM	Marlin, Texas
KZBK	96.9 FM	Brookfield, Missouri
KZBL	100.7 FM	Natchitoches, Louisiana
KZBN	90.3 FM	Bozeman, Montana
KZBQ	93.9 FM	Pocatello, Idaho
KZBR	97.1 FM	La Jara, Colorado
KZBS	104.3 FM	Granite, Oklahoma
KZBT	93.3 FM	Midland, Texas
KZBV	91.3 FM	Carmel Valley, California
KZBY	90.5 FM	Coos Bay, Oregon
KZCD	94.1 FM	Lawton, Oklahoma
KZCE	101.1 FM	Cordes Lakes, Arizona
KZCF	91.5 FM	Atwater, California
KZCH	96.3 FM	Derby, Kansas
KZCK	88.1 FM	Colby, Kansas
KZCR	103.3 FM	Fergus Falls, Minnesota
KZCT	89.5 FM	Vallejo, California
KZDB	100.5 FM	Roswell, New Mexico
KZDV	99.5 FM	Rattan, Oklahoma
KZDX	99.9 FM	Burley, Idaho
KZDY	96.3 FM	Cawker City, Kansas
KZEG	104.9 FM	Sequim, Washington
KZEL-FM	96.1 FM	Eugene, Oregon
KZEN	100.3 FM	Central City, Nebraska
KZEP-FM	104.5 FM	San Antonio, Texas
KZES-FM	91.3 FM	Estelline, Texas
KZET	90.5 FM	Towaoc, Colorado
KZEW	101.7 FM	Wheatland, Wyoming
KZFM	95.5 FM	Corpus Christi, Texas
KZFN	106.1 FM	Moscow, Idaho
KZFR	90.1 FM	Chico, California
KZFT	90.5 FM	Fannett, Texas
KZFX	93.7 FM	Ridgecrest, California
KZGC-FM	91.9 FM	Garden City, Kansas
KZGF	94.7 FM	Grand Forks, North Dakota
KZGI	105.7 FM	Sedro-Woolley, Washington
KZGL	103.7 FM	Flagstaff, Arizona
KZGM	88.1 FM	Cabool, Missouri
KZGU	99.5 FM	Garapan, Northern Mariana Islands
KZGZ	97.5 FM	Agana, Guam
KZHC-FM	92.7 FM	Burns, Oregon
KZHE	100.5 FM	Stamps, Arkansas
KZHK	95.9 FM	Saint George, Utah
KZHM	95.9 FM	Alamogordo, New Mexico
KZHR	92.5 FM	Dayton, Washington
KZHT	97.1 FM	Salt Lake City, Utah
KZIA	102.9 FM	Cedar Rapids, Iowa
KZIC	89.9 FM	Hondo, Texas
KZID	98.5 FM	Culdesac, Idaho
KZIG	107.5 FM	Wapanucka, Oklahoma
KZII-FM	102.5 FM	Lubbock, Texas
KZIN-FM	96.7 FM	Shelby, Montana
KZIO	104.3 FM	Two Harbors, Minnesota
KZIQ-FM	92.7 FM	Ridgecrest, California
KZIS	107.9 FM	Sacramento, California
KZJB	90.3 FM	Pocatello, Idaho
KZJH	95.3 FM	Jackson, Wyoming
KZJJ	104.5 FM	Mesa, Washington
KZJK	104.1 FM	Saint Louis Park, Minnesota
KZJZ	106.7 FM	Babbitt, Minnesota
KZKE	103.3 FM	Seligman, Arizona
KZKL	90.5 FM	Wichita Falls, Texas
KZKR	105.1 FM	Jonesville, Louisiana
KZKS	105.3 FM	Rifle, Colorado
KZKV	103.1 FM	Karnes City, Texas
KZKX	96.9 FM	Seward, Nebraska
KZKY	104.5 FM	Ucon, Idaho
KZKZ-FM	106.3 FM	Greenwood, Arkansas
KZLA	98.3 FM	Riverdale, California
KZLB	92.1 FM	Fort Dodge, Iowa
KZLE	93.1 FM	Batesville, Arkansas
KZLF	97.5 FM	Alva, Oklahoma
KZLG	95.9 FM	Mansura, Louisiana
KZLK	106.3 FM	Rapid City, South Dakota
KZLM	107.9 FM	Lewistown, Montana
KZLO	88.7 FM	Kilgore, Texas
KZLR	88.3 FM	Fairbanks, Alaska
KZLT-FM	104.3 FM	East Grand Forks, Minnesota
KZLV	91.3 FM	Lytle, Texas
KZLW	90.1 FM	Gretna, Nebraska
KZLY	99.5 FM	Ione, Oregon
KZLZ	105.3 FM	Casas Adobes, Arizona
KZMA	99.9 FM	Naylor, Missouri
KZMC	102.1 FM	McCook, Nebraska
KZMG	102.7 FM	Melba, Idaho
KZMI	103.9 FM	Garapan, Northern Mariana Islands
KZMJ	94.5 FM	Gainesville, Texas
KZMK	100.9 FM	Sierra Vista, Arizona
KZML	95.9 FM	Quincy, Washington
KZMN	103.9 FM	Kalispell, Montana
KZMO	93.7 FM	Fair Grove, Missouri
KZMP-FM	104.9 FM	Pilot Point, Texas
KZMQ-FM	100.3 FM	Greybull, Wyoming
KZMT	101.1 FM	Helena, Montana
KZMU	90.1 FM	Moab, Utah
KZMX-FM	96.3 FM	Hot Springs, South Dakota
KZMY	103.5 FM	Bozeman, Montana
KZMZ	96.9 FM	Alexandria, Louisiana
KZNA	90.5 FM	Hill City, Kansas
KZNC	91.9 FM	Red Dog Mine Port, Alaska
KZND-FM	94.7 FM	Houston, Alaska
KZNK	90.1 FM	Brewster, Kansas
KZNM	100.9 FM	Towaoc, Colorado
KZNN	105.3 FM	Rolla, Missouri
KZNP	90.7 FM	Mullan, Idaho
KZNR	91.1 FM	Red Dog Mine, Alaska
KZNS-FM	97.5 FM	Coalville, Utah
KZNW	103.3 FM	Oak Harbor, Washington
KZNZ	91.5 FM	Elkhart, Kansas
KZOK-FM	102.5 FM	Seattle, Washington
KZON	95.1 FM	Sun City West, Arizona
KZOQ-FM	100.1 FM	Missoula, Montana
KZOR	94.1 FM	Hobbs, New Mexico
KZOW	91.9 FM	Forest City, Iowa
KZOZ	93.3 FM	San Luis Obispo, California
KZPK	98.9 FM	Paynesville, Minnesota
KZPL	105.1 FM	Encinal, Texas
KZPO	103.3 FM	Lindsay, California
KZPR	105.3 FM	Minot, North Dakota
KZPS	92.5 FM	Dallas, Texas
KZPT	99.7 FM	Kansas City, Missouri
KZQD	105.1 FM	Liberal, Kansas
KZQL	105.5 FM	Mills, Wyoming
KZQX	100.3 FM	Tatum, Texas
KZRB	103.5 FM	New Boston, Texas
KZRC	96.1 FM	Bennington, Oklahoma
KZRD	93.9 FM	Dodge City, Kansas
KZRF-FM	91.9 FM	Sulphur Springs, Texas
KZRI	88.7 FM	Sandy, Oregon
KZRK-FM	107.9 FM	Canyon, Texas
KZRN	102.3 FM	Hettinger, North Dakota
KZRO	100.1 FM	Dunsmuir, California
KZRR	94.1 FM	Albuquerque, New Mexico
KZRS	107.9 FM	Great Bend, Kansas
KZRV	96.7 FM	Sartell, Minnesota
KZRX	92.1 FM	Dickinson, North Dakota
KZRZ	98.3 FM	West Monroe, Louisiana
KZSC	88.1 FM	Santa Cruz, California
KZSD-FM	102.5 FM	Martin, South Dakota
KZSE	91.7 FM	Rochester, Minnesota
KZSN	102.1 FM	Hutchinson, Kansas
KZSQ-FM	92.7 FM	Sonora, California
KZST	100.1 FM	Santa Rosa, California
KZSU	90.1 FM	Stanford, California
KZSZ	107.5 FM	Colusa, California
KZTA	96.9 FM	Naches, Washington
KZTB	97.9 FM	Milton-Freewater, Oregon
KZTH	88.5 FM	Piedmont, Oklahoma
KZTI	105.3 FM	Fallon Station, Nevada
KZTK	103.9 FM	Arthur, North Dakota
KZTL	93.5 FM	Paxton, Nebraska
KZTM	102.9 FM	McKenna, Washington
KZTP	104.3 FM	Sibley, Iowa
KZTU-FM	90.5 FM	Tucumcari, New Mexico
KZTW	104.1 FM	Tioga, North Dakota
KZTX	91.1 FM	Encino, Texas
KZTZ	92.1 FM	Cottonwood, California
KZUA	92.1 FM	Holbrook, Arizona
KZUH	92.7 FM	Minneapolis, Kansas
KZUL-FM	104.5 FM	Lake Havasu City, Arizona
KZUM	89.3 FM	Lincoln, Nebraska
KZUS	92.3 FM	Ephrata, Washington
KZUU	90.7 FM	Pullman, Washington
KZUW	88.5 FM	Reliance, Wyoming
KZUZ	93.5 FM	Show Low, Arizona
KZWA	104.9 FM	Moss Bluff, Louisiana
KZWB	97.9 FM	Green River, Wyoming
KZWL	94.3 FM	Bullard, Texas
KZWV	101.9 FM	Eldon, Missouri
KZWY	94.9 FM	Sheridan, Wyoming
KZXK	98.9 FM	Doney Park, Arizona
KZXL	96.3 FM	Hudson, Texas
KZXQ	104.5 FM	Reserve, New Mexico
KZXR-FM	101.7 FM	Prosser, Washington
KZXT	93.5 FM	Eureka, Montana
KZXY-FM	102.3 FM	Apple Valley, California
KZYK	88.9 FM	Santee, Nebraska
KZYN	104.1 FM	Toquerville, Utah
KZYQ	101.5 FM	Eudora, Arkansas
KZYR	97.7 FM	Avon, Colorado
KZYX	90.7 FM	Philo, California
KZYZ	91.5 FM	Willits, California
KZZA	106.7 FM	Muenster, Texas
KZZI	95.9 FM	Belle Fourche, South Dakota
KZZK	105.9 FM	New London, Missouri
KZZL-FM	99.5 FM	Pullman, Washington
KZZM	101.7 FM	Mason, Texas
KZZO	100.5 FM	Sacramento, California
KZZP	104.7 FM	Mesa, Arizona
KZZQ	101.9 FM	Richardton, North Dakota
KZZR	94.3 FM	Government Camp, Oregon
KZZS	98.3 FM	Story, Wyoming
KZZT	105.5 FM	Moberly, Missouri
KZZU-FM	92.9 FM	Spokane, Washington
KZZW	104.5 FM	Mooreland, Oklahoma
KZZX	105.3 FM	Alamogordo, New Mexico
KZZY	103.5 FM	Devils Lake, North Dakota

== See also ==
- North American call sign
