= 106.1 FM =

FM radio frequency

The following radio stations broadcast on FM frequency 106.1 MHz:

== Argentina ==
- Aprender in Buenos Aires
- Atomika in San Martín, Buenos Aires
- LRJ925 Capilla de Rodríguez in Villa Ascasubi, Córdoba
- Enterprice in Mendoza
- Imagen in San Antonio De Areco, Buenos Aires
- OH! in Casilda, Santa Fe
- Plus in Buenos Aires
- Radio María in Las Toninas, Buenos Aires
- Radio María in Villa Cañas, Santa Fe
- Rio in Río Segundo, Córdoba
- Uno in Franck, Santa Fe
- Víctor in Córdoba

== Australia ==
- 5TCB in Bordertown, South Australia
- ABC Classic in Newcastle, New South Wales
- ABC Classic in Brisbane, Queensland
- ABC North and West SA in Coober Pedy, South Australia
- Triple J in Longreach, Queensland

== Canada (Channel 291) ==
- CBAM-FM in Moncton, New Brunswick
- CBAX-FM-3 in Yarmouth, Nova Scotia
- CBCS-FM-1 in Temagami, Ontario
- CBGA-11-FM in Mont-Louis, Quebec
- CBSI-FM-24 in Baie-Comeau, Quebec
- CFAF-FM in La Grande-1, Quebec
- CFIT-FM in Airdrie, Alberta
- CFKX-FM in High Level, Alberta
- CHEZ-FM in Ottawa, Ontario
- CHWE-FM in Winnipeg, Manitoba
- CIEU-FM-1 in Paspebiac, Quebec
- CIMJ-FM in Guelph, Ontario
- CIMO-FM in Magog, Quebec
- CKCR-FM in Revelstoke, British Columbia
- CKHH-FM in Hudson's Hope, British Columbia
- CKJM-FM in Chéticamp, Nova Scotia
- CKKX-FM in Peace River, Alberta
- CKLM-FM in Lloydminster, Alberta/Saskatchewan
- CKSE-FM in Estevan, Saskatchewan
- CKWC-FM in Whale Cove, Nunavut
- VF2145 in Arctic Red River, Northwest Territories
- VF2161 in Haines Junction, Yukon
- VF2219 in Seton Portage, British Columbia
- VF2259 in Ferry Hill, Yukon
- VF2536 in Grand Forks, British Columbia
- VF2567 in Clearwater, British Columbia
- VF7308 in Oakville, Ontario

== China ==
- CNR The Voice of China in Beijing and Fangchenggang
- Guangzhou Traffic & Emergency Radio

== Indonesia ==
- Geronimo FM in Yogyakarta, Special Region of Yogyakarta

== Malaysia ==
- Ai FM in Kuantan, Pahang and Taiping, Perak
- Suria in Kota Bharu, Kelantan

== Mexico ==
- XHCDMX-FM in Mexico City
- XHCHIL-FM in Chilchota, Michoacán
- XHEDI-FM in Oaxaca-San Sebastián Tutla, Oaxaca
- XHETF-FM in Veracruz, Veracruz
- XHGCY-FM in Juchitán de Zaragoza, Oaxaca
- XHITS-FM in Monterrey, Nuevo León
- XHLTZ-FM in Aguascalientes, Aguascalientes
- XHPCA-FM in Pachuca, Hidalgo
- XHRRA-FM in Fresnillo, Zacatecas
- XHSU-FM in Chihuahua, Chihuahua
- XHTUT-FM in Villa de Tututepec de Melchor Ocampo, Oaxaca
- XHUAEM-FM in Cuernavaca, Morelos

== Philippines ==
- DYJV in Boracay, Aklan

== Romania ==
- Radio Chișinău in Tighina

== United Kingdom ==
- Capital Scotland in Glasgow
- Heart South Wales in Ebbw Vale
- The Voice in Barnstaple
- Radio X 90s in Manchester, England

== United States (Channel 291) ==
- KBKS-FM in Tacoma, Washington
- KBZI in Mooreland, Oklahoma
- KCEV-LP in Marshall, Texas
- KCFA in Arnold, California
- KCII-FM in Washington, Iowa
- KDXU-FM in Colorado City, Arizona
- KEAC-LP in Cardwell, Montana
- KEXS-FM in Ravenwood, Missouri
- KFCX in Floydada, Texas
- KFFB in Fairfield Bay, Arkansas
- KFMQ in Gallup, New Mexico
- KFSZ in Munds Park, Arizona
- KGIG-LP in Salida, California
- KHKS in Denton, Texas
- KIOC in Orange, Texas
- KIXO in Sulphur, Oklahoma
- KIYX in Sageville, Iowa
- KJOE in Slayton, Minnesota
- KKBI in Broken Bow, Oklahoma
- KKMV in Rupert, Idaho
- KKVR in Kerrville, Texas
- KLCI in Elk River, Minnesota
- KLEO in Kahaluu, Hawaii
- KLMI in Rock River, Wyoming
- KLSS-FM in Mason City, Iowa
- KMDX in San Angelo, Texas
- KMEL in San Francisco, California
- KNEX (FM) in Laredo, Texas
- KNFO in Basalt, Colorado
- KNUZ (FM) in San Saba, Texas
- KONR-LP in Anchorage, Alaska
- KOQL in Ashland, Missouri
- KPLM in Palm Springs, California
- KPQP in Panhandle, Texas
- KPYM in Matagorda, Texas
- KPZE-FM in Carlsbad, New Mexico
- KQDI-FM in Highwood, Montana
- KQLX-FM in Lisbon, North Dakota
- KRAB in Greenacres, California
- KRRX in Burney, California
- KRZX in Redlands, Colorado
- KTGX in Owasso, Oklahoma
- KTTX in Brenham, Texas
- KURE-LP in Eloy, Arizona
- KWCQ in Condon, Oregon
- KWKZ in Charleston, Missouri
- KWUF-FM in Pagosa Springs, Colorado
- KWWV in Santa Margarita, California
- KXHM in Refugio, Texas
- KXKU in Lyons, Kansas
- KXRR in Monroe, Louisiana
- KXXL in Moorcroft, Wyoming
- KYVZ in Atwood, Kansas
- KZCC-LP in Conroe, Texas
- KZFN in Moscow, Idaho
- WACD in Antigo, Wisconsin
- WAKT-LP in Toledo, Ohio
- WATO in Oliver Springs, Tennessee
- WBBG in Niles, Ohio
- WBBX in Pocomoke City, Maryland
- WBLI in Patchogue, New York
- WBMH in Grove Hill, Alabama
- WCGH in Farmington Township, Pennsylvania
- WCNR in Keswick, Virginia
- WCOD-FM in Hyannis, Massachusetts
- WCWI in Adams, Wisconsin
- WDKS in Newburgh, Indiana
- WDSJ-LP in Ooltewah, Tennessee
- WFXH-FM in Hilton Head Island, South Carolina
- WHDQ in Claremont, New Hampshire
- WHKV in Sylvester, Georgia
- WJNX-FM in Okeechobee, Florida
- WJXQ in Charlotte, Michigan
- WJZS in Live Oak, Florida
- WLRX in Vinton, Virginia
- WKTM in Soperton, Georgia
- WLZD-LP in Hazard, Kentucky
- WMEM (FM) in Presque Isle, Maine
- WMIL-FM in Waukesha, Wisconsin
- WMMY in Jefferson, North Carolina
- WMOR-FM in Morehead, Kentucky
- WMXU in Starkville, Mississippi
- WNGC in Arcade, Georgia
- WNKI in Corning, New York
- WNNA in Beaver Springs, Pennsylvania
- WOBS-LP in Orangeburg, South Carolina
- WOLS in Waxhaw, North Carolina
- WPDA in Jeffersonville, New York
- WQTL in Tallahassee, Florida
- WQTR-LP in Savannah, Tennessee
- WRKN in Picayune, Mississippi
- WRQE in Cumberland, Maryland
- WRRH in Hormigueros, Puerto Rico
- WRRX in Gulf Breeze, Florida
- WRZZ in Parkersburg, West Virginia
- WSCA-LP in Portsmouth, New Hampshire
- WSMI-FM in Litchfield, Illinois
- WSTH-FM in Alexander City, Alabama
- WTAK-FM in Hartselle, Alabama
- WTKK in Knightdale, North Carolina
- WTQT-LP in Baton Rouge, Louisiana
- WTUA in Saint Stephen, South Carolina
- WTZM in Tawas City, Michigan
- WUGM-LP in Muskegon, Michigan
- WUMR in Philadelphia, Pennsylvania
- WUSH in Poquoson, Virginia
- WVIS in Vieques, Puerto Rico
- WVNO-FM in Mansfield, Ohio
- WWWY in North Vernon, Indiana
- WYCO-LP in York, Pennsylvania
- WYKY in Science Hill, Kentucky
- WYYS in Streator, Illinois
