= List of radio stations in Oaxaca =

This is a list of radio stations in the Mexican state of Oaxaca, which can be sorted by their call signs, frequencies, location, ownership, names, and programming formats.

Radio stations in Oaxaca
Call sign	Frequency	Location	Owner	Name	Format
XEOA-AM (Note: Linked to XHEOA-FM, which must keep XEOA-AM on the air until there are no listeners in its service area unserved by other radio stations or the IFT orders it to cease to make way for a new station.)	570 AM	Oaxaca de Juárez	Radiodifusora XEOA-AM, S.A. de C.V.	La Mexicana	Regional Mexican
XEPX-AM (Note: Linked to XHEPX-FM, which must keep XEPX-AM on the air until there are no listeners in its service area unserved by other radio stations or the IFT orders it to cease to make way for a new station.)	650 AM	Puerto Ángel (El Vigía)	Radio Solución, S.A. de C.V.	La Voz del Ángel	
XEYG-AM (Note: Linked to XHYG-FM, which must keep XEYG-AM on the air until there are no listeners in its service area unserved by other radio stations or the IFT orders it to cease to make way for a new station.)	660 AM	Matías Romero	Complejo Satelital, S.A. de C.V.	Ke Buena	Regional Mexican
XEOAEP-AM	710 AM	Oaxaca de Juárez	Escápate al Paraíso, S.A. de C.V.	—	—
XEPOR-AM (Note: Linked to XHPOR-FM, which must keep XEPOR-AM on the air until there are no listeners in its service area unserved by other radio stations or the IFT orders it to cease to make way for a new station.)	740 AM	Putla Villa de Guerrero	Michael Amando Meneses Olaya	Tprende	Regional Mexican
XEGLO-AM	780 AM	Guelatao de Juarez	Instituto Nacional de los Pueblos Indígenas	La Voz de la Sierra Juárez	Indigenous radio
XEACC-AM (Note: Linked to XHACC-FM, which must keep XEACC-AM on the air until there are no listeners in its service area unserved by other radio stations or the IFT orders it to cease to make way for a new station.)	870 AM	Puerto Escondido	Radio Solución, S.A. de C.V.	La Voz del Puerto	
XETLA-AM	930 AM	Tlaxiaco	Instituto Nacional de los Pueblos Indígenas	La Voz de la Mixteca	Indigenous radio
XEOJN-AM	950 AM	San Lucas Ojitlan	Instituto Nacional de los Pueblos Indígenas	La Voz de la Chinantla	Indigenous
XEIU-AM (Note: Combo with XHIU-FM 105.7)	990 AM	Oaxaca de Juarez	Radio XEIU, S.A. de C.V.	La Z	Regional Mexican
XEJAM-AM	1260 AM	Santiago Jamiltepec	Instituto Nacional de los Pueblos Indígenas	La Voz de la Costa Chica	Indigenous
XHÑUC-FM	88.1 FM	Chalcatongo de Hidalgo y San Agustín Tlacotepec	Ñucuaha, A.C.	La Favorita	Community radio
XHSCGB-FM	88.1 FM	San Baltazar Chichicápam	La Esperanza Zapoteca, A.C.	La Zapoteca, La Frecuencia Comunitaria	Community radio
XHGJO-FM	88.3 FM	Guelatao de Juárez	Instituto Nacional de los Pueblos Indígenas	La Voz de la Sierra Juárez	Indigenous radio
XHPLEO-FM	88.5 FM	Huajuapan de León	La Puerta de la Mixteca, S. de R.L. de C.V.	La GranDiosa de Huajuapan	Regional Mexican
XHTLJ-FM	88.9 FM	Tlaxiaco	Gobierno del Estado de Oaxaca	Oaxaqueña Radio	Public radio
XHAXA-FM	88.9 FM	Oaxaca de Juárez	Fundación Ecoforestal, A.C.	La Lupe	Spanish adult hits
XHSBC-FM	88.9 FM	San Juan Bautista Cuicatlán	Gobierno del Estado de Oaxaca	Oaxaqueña Radio	Public radio
XHIKE-FM	89.1 FM	Salina Cruz	Ike Siidi Viaa, A.C.	Radio Activa	Community radio
XHJBC-FM	89.3 FM	San Juan Bautista Coixtlahuaca	Gobierno del Estado de Oaxaca	Oaxaqueña Radio	Public radio
XHOCA-FM	89.7 FM	Oaxaca de Juárez	Radio XHOCA, S. de R.L. de C.V.	Los 40	Contemporary hit radio
XHSMJ-FM	89.7 FM	Santa María Jalapa del Marqués	Gobierno del Estado de Oaxaca	Oaxaqueña Radio	Public radio
XHTXP-FM	89.9 FM	San Juan Bautista Tuxtepec	Asociación de Medios de Comunicación Comunitaria, A.C.	Radio Cuenca	Variety
XHSCLX-FM	89.9 FM	Santa María Colotepec	Radio Comunitaria Colotepec, A.C.	—	—
XHCHT-FM	90.1 FM	Chalcatongo de Hidalgo	Gobierno del Estado de Oaxaca	Oaxaqueña Radio	Public radio
XHAH-FM	90.1 FM	Juchitán de Zaragoza	Radiodifusoras Unidas del Sureste, S.A.	Radio Hit	
XHCSIP-FM	90.3 FM	San Martín Peras	Rubí Jazmín Paz Aparicio	—	—
XHYG-FM	90.5 FM	Matías Romero	Complejo Satelital, S.A. de C.V.	Ke Buena	Regional Mexican
XHCPBO-FM	90.7 FM	Santiago Jamiltepec	Instituto Nacional de los Pueblos Indígenas	—	—
XHMPD-FM	90.9 FM	Miahuatlán de Porfirio Díaz	Gobierno del Estado de Oaxaca	Oaxaqueña Radio	Public radio
XHSCFM-FM	91.3 FM	Cuilápam de Guerrero	Jaguar Mixteco Coo Dzahul, A.C.	Radio Cuilapam	Community radio
XHCMA-FM	91.5 FM	El Camarón	Gobierno del Estado de Oaxaca	Oaxaqueña Radio	Public radio
XHTEKA-FM	91.7 FM	Juchitán de Zaragoza	Bertha Cruz Toledo	Radio Teka	
XHPLH-FM	91.7 FM	Pluma Hidalgo	Gobierno del Estado de Oaxaca	Oaxaqueña Radio	Public radio
XHHPL-FM	91.9 FM	Huajuapan de León	Gobierno del Estado de Oaxaca	Oaxaqueña Radio	Public radio
XHOJF-FM	92.1 FM	Ocotlán de Morelos	Municipio de Ocotlán de Morelos	Stereo Arkangel, El Patrón	Variety
XHPUV-FM	92.1 FM	Putla Villa de Guerrero	Gobierno del Estado de Oaxaca	Oaxaqueña Radio	Public radio
XHPSJB-FM	92.3 FM	San Juan Bautista Tuxtepec	Centrado Corporativo, S.A. de C.V.	Arre en Acustik	Regional Mexican
XHSCFI-FM	92.5 FM	San Lorenzo Cacaotepec	Voces de Cacaotepec, A.C.	La Consentida	Community radio
XHPVTP-FM	92.7 FM	Villa de Tamazulápam del Progreso	Servicios Inmobiliarios Tierra Mojada, S.A. de C.V.	La Picosita	Regional Mexican
XHSLC-FM	92.9 FM	Salina Cruz	Gobierno del Estado de Oaxaca	Oaxaqueña Radio	Public radio
XHCRR-FM	92.9 FM	Zoquiápam	Gobierno del Estado de Oaxaca	Oaxaqueña Radio	Public radio
XHSCKC-FM	93.1 FM	San Juan Bautista Tuxtepec	Por el Derecho a la Información y la Libre Expresión, A.C.	Stereo Chaquiste	
XHACC-FM	93.3 FM	Puerto Escondido	Radio Solución, S.A. de C.V.	La Voz del Puerto	
XHSCCF-FM	93.3 FM	Tlacolula de Matamoros	Fundación Guish Bac, Abriendo los Cielos, A.C.	Estéreo Guish-Bac	Community radio
XHVSE-FM	93.3 FM	Villa Sola de Vega	Gobierno del Estado de Oaxaca	Oaxaqueña Radio	Public radio
XHAX-FM	93.7 FM	Oaxaca de Juárez	Organización XHAX, S.A. de C.V.	Radio Fórmula	News/talk
XHYAT-FM	94.1 FM	Ciudad Ixtepec	Yati Ne Casti, A.C.	Oaxaca Radio	Community radio
XHEDO-FM	94.1 FM	Puerto Escondido	Nueva Esmeralda 94.1, S.A. de C.V.	La Mejor	Regional Mexican
XHTRO-FM	94.1 FM	Santa María Asunción Tlaxiaco	Tlaxiaqueños Radicados en Oaxaca, A.C.	La GranDiosa	Regional Mexican
XHPBLM-FM	94.3 FM	Loma Bonita	Juntos por Loma Bonita, A.C.	—	—
XHTFO-FM	94.3 FM	Teotitlán de Flores Magón	Gobierno del Estado de Oaxaca	Oaxaqueña Radio	Public radio
XHPCRU-FM	94.5 FM	Salina Cruz	Enza Telecom, S.A. de C.V.	Hits 94.5	Contemporary hit radio
XHSTH-FM	94.5 FM	Santa María Tlahuitoltepec	Gobierno del Estado de Oaxaca	Oaxaqueña Radio	Public radio
XHJUX-FM	94.7 FM	Santiago Juxtlahuaca	Rutilio Carlos Méndez Martínez	Radio InspiraZion	Christian
XHEOA-FM	94.9 FM	Oaxaca de Juárez	Radiodifusora XEOA-AM, S.A. de C.V.	La Mexicana	Regional Mexican
XHEJU-FM	95.3 FM	Ejutla de Crespo	Colectivo Oaxaqueño para Difusión de Cultura y las Artes, A.C.	La Ejuteca Radio	Community radio
XHPSAL-FM	95.3 FM	Salina Cruz	Centrado Corporativo, S.A. de C.V.	Arre en Acustik	Regional Mexican
XHSJB-FM	95.3 FM	San Juan Bautista Valle Nacional	Gobierno del Estado de Oaxaca	Oaxaqueña Radio	Public radio
XHPEDN-FM	95.5 FM	Puerto Escondido	Rate Cultural y Educativa de México, A.C.	—	—
XHCE-FM	95.7 FM	Oaxaca de Juarez	Complejo Satelital, S.A. de C.V.	W Radio	News/talk
XHPBSD-FM	95.9 FM	Tlaxiaco (San Diego)	Instituto Nacional de los Pueblos Indígenas	La Voz de la Mixteca	Indigenous radio
XHSCO-FM	96.3 FM	Salina Cruz	Instituto Mexicano de la Radio	Estéreo Istmo	Public radio
XHZAA-FM	96.3 FM	Villa de Zaachila	Cultura y Comunicación de Zaachila, A.C.	Zaachila Radio	Community radio
XHPNOC-FM	96.5 FM	Asunción Nochixtlán	Enza Telecom, S.A. de C.V.	Hits 96.5	Contemporary hit radio
XHSPH-FM	96.7 FM	San Pedro Huamelula	Gobierno del Estado de Oaxaca	Oaxaqueña Radio	Public radio
XHOAX-FM	96.9 FM	Oaxaca de Juárez	Gobierno del Estado de Oaxaca	Global 96.9	Public radio
XHUH-FM	96.9 FM	San Juan Bautista Tuxtepec	Teresa de Jesús Bravo Sobrón	Universal	Adult contemporary
XHHLL-FM	97.1 FM	Salina Cruz	Sucesión Humberto Alejandro López Lena Robles	Los 40	Regional Mexican
XHUAU-FM	97.3 FM	Huautla de Jiménez	Gobierno del Estado de Oaxaca	Oaxaqueña Radio	Public radio
XHSPN-FM	97.3 FM	Santiago Pinotepa Nacional	Gobierno del Estado de Oaxaca	Oaxaqueña Radio	Public radio
XHRPO-FM	97.7 FM	Santa Cruz Amilpas	R.R. Televisión y Valores Para la Innovación, S.A. de C.V.	El Heraldo Radio	News/talk
XHASU-FM	98.1 FM	Asunción Nochixtlán	Abel Santiago Miguel	Asunción FM	Variety
XHPNX-FM	98.1 FM	Santiago Pinotepa Nacional	Complejo Satelital, S.A. de C.V.	Ke Buena	Regional Mexican
XHKZ-FM	98.1 FM	Santo Domingo Tehuantepec	Radiodifusora XEKZ-AM, S.A. de C.V.	La Poderosa	Regional Mexican
XHNR-FM	98.5 FM	Oaxaca de Juárez	Organización XHNR, S.A. de C.V.	Exa FM	Contemporary hit radio
XHPVTS-FM	98.5 FM	Villa Tututepec	Radio Casandoo, S.A. de C.V.	W Radio	News/talk
XHPOR-FM	98.7 FM	Putla Villa de Guerrero	Michael Amando Meneses Olaya	Tprende	Regional Mexican
XHPIXT-FM	98.9 FM	Asuncion Nochixtlán	El Sol Nochixteco, S. de R.L. de C.V.	La GranDiosa de Nochixtlán	Regional Mexican
XHPBJZ-FM	98.9 FM	Juchitán de Zaragoza y Unión Hidalgo	Publicando Valores, A.C.	Omega Radio	Catholic
XHPTEC-FM	99.1 FM	Santiago Juxtlahuaca	Corporativo Empresarial 2 Ríos, S. de R.L. de C.V.	G-Pop	Contemporary hit radio
XHCSAN-FM	99.3 FM	Salina Cruz	Instituto Michoacano de Radiodifusión, A.C.	—	—
XHSAJ-FM	99.3 FM	Santa Catarina Juquila	Gobierno del Estado de Oaxaca	Oaxaqueña Radio	Public radio
XHSMT-FM	99.5 FM	Santa María Tecomavaca	Gobierno del Estado de Oaxaca	Oaxaqueña Radio	Public radio
XHSCJI-FM	99.7 FM	Ocotlán de Morelos	Comunicación Radiofónica Arkangel Miguel el Patrón, A.C.	—	—
XHEPX-FM	99.9 FM	Puerto Ángel	Radio Solución, S.A. de C.V.	La Voz del Ángel	
XHPHUA-FM	100.1 FM	Huajuapan de León	Enza Telecom, S.A. de C.V.	Hits 100.1	Contemporary hit radio
XHOQ-FM	100.1 FM	Oaxaca de Juárez	Radiodifusora XHOQ-FM, S.A. de C.V.	La Poderosa	Regional Mexican
XHDCA-FM	100.5 FM	Miahuatlán de Porfirio Diaz	Colectivo Oaxaqueño Para Difusión de Cultura y Las Artes, A.C.	Estéreo Dinastia	Community radio
XHTLX-FM	100.5 FM	Santa María Asunción Tlaxiaco	Radiodifusora Tlaxiaqueña, S.A. de C.V.	La Poderosa	Regional Mexican
XHLAB-FM	100.9 FM	Lagunas Barrio de la Soledad	Gobierno del Estado de Oaxaca	Oaxaqueña Radio	Public radio
XHMAJ-FM	100.9 FM	Mariscala de Juárez	Gobierno del Estado de Oaxaca	Oaxaqueña Radio	Public radio
XHKC-FM	100.9 FM	Oaxaca de Juárez	Grupo Radiodigital Siglo XXI, S.A. de C.V.	La Z	Regional Mexican
XHSJO-FM	101.1 FM	Santiago Juxtlahuaca	Gobierno del Estado de Oaxaca	Oaxaqueña Radio	Public radio
XHSCDL-FM	101.3 FM	Juchitán de Zaragoza	Binni Za Gunaa Lu Xhono Cubidxa Beu Riguibashigaa, Grupo de Mujeres 8 de Marzo, A.C.	Radio Cultural Stipa Gunaa	Community radio
XHPTUX-FM	101.3 FM	San Juan Bautista Tuxtepec	Radio Casandoo, S.A. de C.V.	Exa FM	contemporary hit radio
XHZB-FM	101.7 FM	Oaxaca de Juárez	Radiodifusora XHZB, S.A. de C.V.	La Mejor	Regional Mexican
XHSCCW-FM	102.1 FM	San Antonio de la Cal	Por el Oaxaca Que Todos Queremos, A.C.	Aire Libre	Community radio
XHSIBX-FM	102.3 FM	San Andrés Chicahuaxtla	Comunidad Indígena de San Andrés Chicahuaxtla Asentada en Putla Villa de Guerrero, Oaxaca	Radiu Yuma'an	Indigenous
XHSPP-FM	102.3 FM	San Pedro Pochutla	Radio Pochutla, S.A. de C.V.	Radio Crystal	Regional Mexican
XHVTM-FM	102.5 FM	Villa de Tamazulapam del Progreso	Gobierno del Estado de Oaxaca	Oaxaqueña Radio	Public radio
XHJBT-FM	102.7 FM	San Juan Bautista Tuxtepec	Gobierno del Estado de Oaxaca	Oaxaqueña Radio	Public radio
XHUAT-FM	103.1 FM	Santa María Huatulco	Casio Carlos Enrique Narváez y Lidolf	Estéreo Huatulco	
XHSCBV-FM	103.3 FM	San Antonio Castillo Velasco	Comunicación y Desarrollo Laní Nashí, A.C.	—	—
XHCA-FM	103.9 FM	Lagunas, Barrio de la Soledad	Club Deportivo Social y Cultural Cruz Azul, A.C.	Azul FM	Variety
XHSFJ-FM	103.9 FM	San Felipe Jalapa de Díaz	Gobierno del Estado de Oaxaca	Oaxaqueña Radio	Public radio
XHPEP-FM	104.1 FM	San Pedro y San Pablo Teposcolula	Gobierno del Estado de Oaxaca	Oaxaqueña Radio	Public radio
XHCSBU-FM	104.3 FM	San Pedro Mixtepec Distrito 22	Fundación Aire Libre, A.C.	—	—
XHPSEB-FM	104.9 FM	Santiago Juxtlahuaca	Los Ojos del Cielo, S. de R.L. de C.V.	La GranDiosa de Juxtlahuaca	Regional Mexican
XHOU-FM	105.3 FM	Huajuapan de León	Radiodifusora XEOU, S.A. de C.V.	La Mejor	Regional Mexican
XHIU-FM	105.7 FM	Oaxaca de Juarez	Radio XEIU, S.A. de C.V.	Oreja FM	Contemporary hit radio
XHSCKD-FM	105.7 FM	Santa María Huazolotitlán	Unión General de Obreros y Campesinos de los Estados de México, Lázaro Cárdenas, Comité Ejecutivo Regional, A.C.	—	—
XHSCBX-FM	105.7 FM	Santiago Juxtlahuaca	Abrazando a los Pueblos, Juxtlahuaca, A.C.	La Patrona	Community radio
XHPES-FM	105.9 FM	Puerto Escondido	Gobierno del Estado de Oaxaca	Oaxaqueña Radio	Public radio
XHSCEU-FM	106.1 FM	Huajuapan de León	Tequio y Voz por Mi Pueblo, A.C.	—	—
XHGCY-FM	106.1 FM	Juchitán	Guna Caa Yuni Xhiña, A.C.	Órbita Digital	Community radio
XHEDI-FM	106.1 FM	San Sebastián Tutla, Santa Lucía del Camino, Santa Cruz Xoxocotlán, San Agustín de las Juntas, San Antonio de la Cal, Santa Cruz Amilpas, Villa de Zaachila, San Raymundo Jalpan, Trinidad Zaachila, La Ciénega Zimatlán, San Bartolo Coyotepec y Reyes Mantecón	Esperanza, Destino e Identidad Global, A.C.	Stereo Uno	Community radio
XHTUT-FM	106.1 FM	Villa de Tututepec de Melchor Ocampo	Comunidad Indígena Mixteca de San Pedro Tututepec	Estéreo Lluvia	Indigenous
XHHDH-FM	106.3 FM	Santa María Huatulco	Haciendo Efectivos los Derechos Humanos, A.C.	Radio Mar	Community radio
XHSIAA-FM	106.3 FM	Santa María Yucuhiti	Comunidad Indígena Mixteca en el Municipio de Santa María Yucuhiti, Oaxaca	Radio Yucuhiti	Community radio
XHSCCK-FM	106.5 FM	Salina Cruz	Bianiiluuneza, A.C.	Heraldo Radio Istmo	News/talk
XHXP-FM	106.5 FM	San Juan Bautista Tuxtepec	Sóstenes Bravo Rodríguez	La Mejor	Regional Mexico
XHSIAX-FM	106.7 FM	Rancho Viejo	Comunidad Chatina de Rancho Viejo (Variante de Zenzontepec), Asentada en Rancho Viejo, Municipio de Santa Cruz Zenzontepec	La Voz de la Mujer Chatina	Indigenous
XHSCEW-FM	106.7 FM	San Pedro y San Pablo Teposcolula	Rivemen Mágico, A.C.	—	—
XHVMT-FM	106.9 FM	Santiago Juxtlahuaca	La Voz de la Mixteca, A.C.	Los Ojos del Cielo	Variety
XHSOM-FM	106.9 FM	Tlacolula de Matamoros	Somos Uno Radio La Voz de la Comunidad, A.C.	Somos Uno Radio	Community radio
XHSICS-FM	107.1 FM	San Pedro Amuzgos	Comunidad Indígena Amuzga Tzjon Noan Asentada en San Pedro Amuzgos, Oaxaca	—	—
XHSCJJ-FM	107.1 FM	Santa María Huatulco	Sigamos Haciendo Cultura, A.C.	La Huatulqueña	Community radio
XHSIAB-FM	107.3 FM	San Felipe de la Peña	Un Sonido de Esperanza, A.C.	Radio Embajador	Community radio
XHSCMW-FM	107.3 FM	San Marquitos	Coconatu Colectiva de la Costa de Oaxaca Na a Tundaa, A.C.	—	—
XHSCKI-FM	107.3 FM	Santa Cruz Amilpas	Ka Tsi Yetsi, A.C.	—	—
XHSICD-FM	107.5 FM	San Juan Bautista Coixtlahuaca	Consejo de Gobierno Tradicional del Pueblo Chocholteco Ngigua-Ngiba	Radio Indígena Voces Chocholtecas	Indigenous
XHSCDA-FM	107.5 FM	San Pedro Mixtepec Distrito 22	Comunicación Radiofónica Arkangel Miguel el Patrón, A.C.	Stereo Arkangel, El Patrón	Variety
XHSTC-FM	107.5 FM	Santiago Choápam	Gobierno del Estado de Oaxaca	Oaxaqueña Radio	Public radio
XHSCAP-FM	107.7 FM	Miahuatlán de Porfirio Díaz	Soley Sin Barreras, A.C.	Radio Soley	Community radio
XHTFM-FM	107.9 FM	Mazatlán Villa de Flores	Comunidad Mazateca de Mazatlán Villa de Flores, Teotitlán de Flores Magón, Oaxaca	Radio Nahndía	Indigenous
XHRIG-FM	107.9 FM	Río Grande	Gobierno del Estado de Oaxaca	Oaxaqueña Radio	Public radio
XHRCV-FM	107.9 FM	San Antonino Castillo Velasco	Radio Calenda la Voz del Valle, A.C.	Radio Calenda	Community radio
XHPED-FM	107.9 FM	San Pedro Tapanatepec	Gobierno del Estado de Oaxaca	Oaxaqueña Radio	Public radio
XHJP-FM	107.9 FM	Santa María Tlahuitoltepec, Mixe	Comunidad de Santa María Tlahuitoltepec, Mixe, Oaxaca	Radio Jënpoj	Indigenous

== Defunct stations ==
- XHCORO-FM 98.7, Loma Bonita (1979–2023)
