= KOZI =

KOZI may refer to:

- KOZI (AM), a radio station (1230 AM) licensed to Chelan, Washington, United States
- KOZI-FM, a radio station (93.5 FM) licensed to Chelan, Washington, United States
