= KWKM =

KWKM may refer to:

- KWKM (FM), a radio station (95.7 FM) licensed to St. Johns, Arizona, United States
- KWKM-LP, a defunct low-power television station (channel 10) formerly licensed to Show Low, Arizona
