= KSYY =

KSYY may refer to:

- KDHT (FM) a radio station (95.7 FM) licensed to Denver, Colorado, United States, which held the call sign KSYY-FM from June 1987 to February 1991
- KFXE (FM), a radio station (96.5 FM) licensed to Ingram, Texas, United States, which held the call sign KSYY from 2008 to 2013
- KFCO, a radio station (107.1 FM) licensed to Bennett, Colorado, which held the call sign KSYY-FM from March 2006 to February 2008
