= XHSU-FM =

XHSU-FM may refer to:

- XHSU-FM (Chihuahua), El Lobo 106.1 FM
- XHSU-FM (Mexicali), La Dinámica 105.9 FM and 790 AM
