= KEXS =

KEXS may refer to:

- KEXS (AM), a radio station (1090 AM) licensed to Excelsior Springs, Missouri, United States
- KEXS-FM, a radio station (106.1 FM) licensed to Ravenwood, Missouri, United States
