= KBMF =

KBMF may refer to:

- KBMF-LP, a low-power radio station (102.5 FM) in Butte, Montana
- KMCV, a radio station (89.9 FM) in High Point, Missouri, which held the call sign KBMF from 1999 to 2001
- KXDJ, a radio station (98.3 in Spearman, Texas, which held the call sign KBMF-FM from 1963 to 1978
