= KWYR =

KWYR may refer to:

- KWYR-FM, a radio station (93.7 FM) licensed to Winner, South Dakota, United States
- KWYR (AM), a radio station (1260 AM) licensed to Winner, South Dakota, United States
