= KXBX =

KXBX may refer to:

- KXBX (AM), a radio station (1270 AM) licensed to Lakeport, California, United States
- KXBX-FM, a radio station (98.3 FM) licensed to Lakeport, California, United States
