= KWUF =

KWUF may refer to:

- KWUF (AM), a radio station (1400 AM) licensed to Pagosa Springs, Colorado, United States
- KWUF-FM, a radio station (106.1 FM) licensed to Pagosa Springs, Colorado
