= KWCK =

KWCK may refer to:

- KWCK-FM, a radio station (99.9 FM) licensed to serve Searcy, Arkansas, United States
- KSMD (AM), a radio station (1300 AM) licensed to serve Searcy, Arkansas, which held the call sign KWCK until 2014
