= KZKZ =

KZKZ may refer to:

- KZKZ-FM, a radio station (106.3 FM) licensed to Greenwood, Arkansas, United States
- KZKZ (Philippines), a defunct radio station (540 AM) licensed to Manila, Philippines
