= KWSB =

KWSB may stand for:

- Karachi Water and Sewerage Board, is responsible for production, transmission and distribution of potable water to the citizens of Karachi, Sindh, Pakistan.
- KWSB-FM, a college radio station based at Western State College of Colorado in Gunnison.
