= WDKM =

WDKM may refer to:

- WDKM (FM), a radio station (92.5 FM) licensed to serve Poultney, Vermont, United States
- WCWI, a radio station (106.1 FM) licensed to serve Adams, Wisconsin, United States, which held the call sign WDKM from 1992 to 2014
