= WBLQ =

WBLQ may refer to:

- WBLQ (AM), a radio station (1230 AM) licensed to Westerly, Rhode Island, United States
- WSUB-LP, a radio station (96.7 FM) licensed to Ashaway, Rhode Island, United States, which used the call sign WBLQ-LP from 2005 to 2009
- WKIV, a radio station (88.1 FM) licensed to Westerly, Rhode Island, United States, which used the call sign WBLQ from 1997 to 2005
- WMNP, a radio station (99.3 FM) licensed to Block Island, Rhode Island, United States, which used the call sign WBLQ from 1988 to 1996
- WJET (AM), a radio station (1400 AM) licensed to Erie, Pennsylvania, United States, which used the call sign WBLQ from 1986 to 1988
