= KYCC =

Christian radio station in Stockton, California, United States

KYCC and KCJH

KYCC: Stockton, California; KCJH: Livingston, California; United States
- Broadcast area: KYCC: Stockton; KCJH: Modesto/Turlock, California
- Frequencies: KYCC: 90.1 MHz; KCJH: 89.1 MHz

Programming
- Format: Christian music

Ownership
- Owner: Your Christian Companion Network, Inc.

History
- First air date: KYCC: February 24, 1975; KCJH: 1997
- Call sign meaning: KYCC: Your Christian Companion

Technical information
- Facility ID: KYCC: 63464; KCJH: 63466
- Class: KYCC: B; KCJH: B1
- ERP: KYCC: 41,000 watts; KCJH: 13,500 watts
- HAAT: KYCC: 107 meters (351 ft); KCJH: 93 meters (305 ft)
- Transmitter coordinates: KYCC: 37°57′30″N 121°16′55″W; KCJH: 37°18′57″N 120°43′20″W
- Repeater(s): KYCC: 89.9 KYCM (Alamogordo, New Mexico)

Links
- Webcast: Listen live
- Website: kycc.org

KYCC (90.1 FM), KCJH (89.1 FM), and KYCM (89.9 FM) are radio stations broadcasting a Christian music format. Licensed respectively to Stockton, California, Livingston, California, and Alamogordo, New Mexico, the stations are currently owned by Your Christian Companion Network, Inc. The station also has several satellites and repeaters throughout the western US.

== Additional frequencies ==
In addition to the main station, KYCC is relayed by these stations and translators to widen its broadcast area.

Call sign	Frequency	City of license	FID	ERP (W)	Class	FCC info
K212BJ	90.3 FM	Dublin, California	83192	200	D	LMS
K275BH	102.9 FM	Elk Grove, California	156442	23	D	LMS
K211DF	90.1 FM	Foothill Farms, California	63459	245	D	LMS
K228DM	93.5 FM	Vacaville, California	63458	10	D	LMS
K241MK	96.1 FM	San Bruno, California	96335	50	D	LMS
K201HO	88.1 FM	Reno, Nevada	21091	75	D	LMS
K259AY	99.7 FM	Reno, Nevada	154473	6	D	LMS
K217EU	91.3 FM	Farmington, New Mexico	106693	62	D	LMS
K206CS	89.1 FM	El Paso, Texas	121807	10	D	LMS
