= Richard J. Dalton =

American dance music DJ

Richard J. Dalton (born 19 September 1972 in Eagleswood Township, New Jersey) is an American electronic dance music DJ. He is an international mixshow deejay and has opened for major artists such as Beyoncé and Lady Gaga. In 2009, he was named "Best Hope for High-School Freaks" and in 2011, "Best Club DJ" by Seattle Weekly.

He has electro and techno formatted mixshows on KNHC 89.5 FM in Seattle, WA, XHSU 106.1 FM in Chihuahua, Mexico, and is featured on the Remix Top30 Countdown, which runs on stations across The Americas, hosted by Hollywood Hamilton, including WKTU 103.5 in New York City and WHYI 100.7 in Miami

Dalton also hosts a morning drive time radio program in Seattle, WA.

== Discography ==
DJ Mix Albums

- C89.5 Volume 1 Double CD: Richard J. Dalton (2007)
- C89.5 Volume 2 Double CD: Richard J. Dalton (2007)
- C89.5 Volume 3 Double CD: Richard J. Dalton (2008)
- C89.5 Volume 4 Double CD: Richard J. Dalton (2008)
- C89.5 Volume 5 Double CD: Richard J. Dalton vs. DJ Kyler (2009)
- C89.5 Volume 6 Double CD: Richard J. Dalton vs. DJ Lifeguard (2009)
- C89.5 Volume 7 Double CD: Richard J. Dalton vs. DJ Lifeguard, "The Rematch" (2010)
- C89.5 Volume 8 Double CD: Richard J. Dalton vs. DJ Skiddle (2010)
- C89.5 Volume 9 Double CD: Richard J. Dalton vs. DJ Lifeguard (2011)
- C89.5 Volume 10 Double CD: Richard J. Dalton vs. DJ Skiddle (2011)
- C89.5 Volume 11 Double CD: Richard J. Dalton vs. DJ Lightray (2012)
