= KRNH =

Radio station in Kerrville, Texas

Coordinates: 30.0893°N 99.0863°W

- Kerrville, Texas; United States
- Broadcast area: Kerrville, Texas; Fredericksburg, Texas
- Frequency: 92.3 MHz (HD Radio)
- Branding: 92.3 The Ranch

Programming
- Format: Country
- Subchannels: HD2: Conservative talk; HD3: Classic rock (KFXE); HD4: Country
- Affiliations: Townhall News

Ownership
- Owner: Lyndell Grubbs; (Radio Ranch, Ltd.)
- Sister stations: KKVR, KFXE

History
- First air date: 1990
- Former call signs: KITE (1990–2000)
- Former frequencies: 92.1 MHz (1990–1994)
- Call sign meaning: Ranch

Technical information
- Licensing authority: FCC
- Facility ID: 41061
- Class: C2
- ERP: 20,000 watts
- HAAT: 203 meters (666 ft)

Links
- Public license information: Public file; LMS
- Webcast: Listen Live; Listen Live (HD2); Listen live (HD4)
- Website: 923theranch.com; hillcountrypatriot.com (HD2); hillcountryfox.com (HD4)

KRNH (92.3 FM, "The Ranch") is a radio station licensed to Kerrville, Texas. The station broadcasts a country music format and is owned by Lyndell Grubbs, through licensee Radio Ranch, LLC.

== History ==
The station began broadcasting in October 1990, holding the call sign KITE and airing a soft adult contemporary format. It originally broadcast at 92.1 MHz, but moved to 92.3 MHz in 1994, concurrent with a power increase. Its format shifted to mainstream AC in 1997. In 1998, the station adopted a classic rock format. In 2000, the station was sold to Lyndell Grubbs's Radio Ranch, LLC, for $245,000. In September 2000, the station's call sign was changed to KRNH and it adopted a country music format, with programming from ABC Radio's Real Country network.

== Subchannels ==
=== Hill Country Patriot ===
In March 2018, KRNH launched a news-talk format branded as "The Hill Country Patriot" on its HD2 subchannel, which is simulcast on translators at 104.3 FM in Kerrville and 102.1 FM in Fredericksburg, Texas.

Broadcast translators for KRNH-HD2
Call sign	Frequency	City of license	FID	ERP (W)	HAAT	Class	FCC info
K282BI	104.3 FM	Kerrville, Texas	140641	250	199 m (653 ft)	D	LMS
K271CH	102.1 FM	Fredericksburg, Texas	140636	250	97 m (318 ft)	D	LMS

=== The Raptor ===
On October 1, 2020, KRNH launched a classic rock format on its HD4 subchannel, branded as "106.5 The Raptor", which is simulcast on 106.5 K293CY.

=== The Fox ===
On July 1, 2024, KRNH-HD4 changed their format from classic rock (which moved to KFXE 96.5 FM Ingram and KRNH-HD3) to country, branded as "106.5 The Fox".

Broadcast translator for KRNH-HD4
Call sign	Frequency	City of license	FID	ERP (W)	HAAT	Class	FCC info
K293CY	106.5 FM	Kerrville, Texas	140628	250	199 m (653 ft)	D	LMS
