= KMNA =

- Mabton, Washington; United States
- Broadcast area: Yakima, Washington
- Frequency: 98.7 MHz
- Branding: La Maquina

Programming
- Format: Regional Mexican

Ownership
- Owner: Amador and Rosalie Bustos; (Bustos Media Holdings, LLC)
- Sister stations: KYXE, KZXR-FM, KZTA

History
- First air date: March 5, 1997 (as KLES)
- Former call signs: KLES (1997–2006)

Technical information
- Licensing authority: FCC
- Facility ID: 21602
- Class: C2
- ERP: 11,500 watts
- HAAT: 266.4 meters
- Transmitter coordinates: 46°28′33″N 120°8′37″W

Links
- Public license information: Public file; LMS
- Webcast: Listen Live
- Website: laradiodeaqui.com

KMNA (98.7 FM) is a radio station broadcasting a Regional Mexican format. Licensed to Mabton, Washington, United States, the station serves the Yakima area. The station is currently owned by Amador and Rosalie Bustos' Bustos Media, through licensee Bustos Media Holdings, LLC.

== History ==
The station went on the air as KLES on 1997-03-05. On 2006-05-25, the station changed its call sign to the current KMNA.
