= KRRX =

Coordinates: 40.906°N 121.828°W

- Burney, California; United States
- Broadcast area: Redding / Red Bluff / Corning
- Frequency: 106.1 MHz
- Branding: 106 X

Programming
- Format: Active rock

Ownership
- Owner: Stephens Media Group; (SMG Redding, LLC)

History
- First air date: 1985 (as KARZ)
- Former call signs: KARZ (1983–1997)
- Call sign meaning: K Redding's Rock X

Technical information
- Licensing authority: FCC
- Facility ID: 41241
- Class: C
- ERP: 100,000 watts
- HAAT: 600 meters
- Translator: 104.9 K285DD (Burney)

Links
- Public license information: Public file; LMS
- Webcast: Listen live
- Website: 106x.com

KRRX is a commercial radio station licensed in Burney, California, broadcasting to the Redding, California and Red Bluff, California areas on 106.1 FM. KRRX airs an active rock music format branded as "106 X".

KRRX is owned by Stephens Media Group.
