= XHLTZ-FM =

Radio station in Aguascalientes, Aguascalientes, Mexico

- Aguascalientes, Aguascalientes; Mexico
- Frequency: 106.1 FM
- Branding: La Ranchera

Programming
- Format: Regional Mexican

Ownership
- Owner: Grupo Radiofónico ZER; (Cosmorradial, S.A. de C.V.)

History
- First air date: April 30, 1979 (concession)
- Former frequencies: 740 AM
- Call sign meaning: Loreto, Zacatecas (original community allocated the frequency)

Technical information
- Licensing authority: CRT
- Class: B
- ERP: 25,000 watts
- HAAT: 52.5 meters (172 ft)
- Transmitter coordinates: 21°55′11.05″N 102°15′57.49″W

Links
- Webcast: Listen live
- Website: grupozer.mx

XHLTZ-FM is a radio station in Aguascalientes, Aguascalientes. It is owned by Grupo Radiofónico ZER and broadcasts a Regional Mexican format on 106.1 FM known as La Ranchera.

== History ==
XELTZ-AM 740 received its concession on April 30, 1979. It was moved from Loreto, Zacatecas in two stages, first to El Puertecito de la Virgen, and then to the city of Aguascalientes in December 2002.

XELTZ migrated to FM in 2010 and carried the FM Globo English and Spanish-language romantic music format from MVS Radio and Radio Universal. In May 2011, the station was sold to Grupo Radiofónico ZER, which changed the station's format to Regional Mexican and renamed it as La Tremenda. The current La Ranchera format was adopted in 2012.
