= XHCHIL-FM =

Community radio station in Chilchota, Michoacán

San Juan Carapan, Chilchota, Michoacán; Mexico
- Frequency: 106.1 MHz
- Branding: Radio Eraxamani

Programming
- Format: Community radio

Ownership
- Owner: Ojtakuarhu, A.C.

History
- First air date: February 3, 2018
- Former frequencies: 97.3 MHz (as a pirate)
- Call sign meaning: CHILchota

Technical information
- Class: A

XHCHIL-FM is a community radio station on 106.1 FM in Chilchota, Michoacán. It is known as Radio Eraxamani. Eraxamani originally broadcast as a pirate on 97.3 MHz. The concession for 106.1 was approved on October 4, 2017, with the station signing on February 3, 2018.
