= XHEJU-FM =

Radio station in Ejutla de Crespo, Oaxaca, Mexico

Ejutla de Crespo, Oaxaca; Mexico
- Frequency: 95.3 FM
- Branding: La Ejuteca Radio

Programming
- Format: Community radio

Ownership
- Owner: Colectivo Oaxaqueño para la Difusión de la Cultura y las Artes, A.C. (Codiculta)
- Sister stations: XHDCA-FM (Miahuatlán)

History
- First air date: March 27, 2018; 7 years ago (on 95.3 MHz)
- Former frequencies: 98.1 (as a pirate)
- Call sign meaning: EJUtla de Crespo

Technical information
- Class: A
- ERP: 3 kW
- HAAT: -153.21 m
- Transmitter coordinates: 16°34′01.8″N 96°43′50.4″W

Links
- Webcast: https://tunein.com/radio/La-Ejuteca-953-s344022/
- Website: https://ejuteca.com.mx/

XHEJU-FM is a community radio station on 95.3 FM in Ejutla de Crespo, Oaxaca. It is known as La Ejuteca Radio and owned by the civil association Colectivo Oaxaqueño para la Difusión de la Cultura y las Artes, A.C.

== History ==
XHEJU began broadcasting in 2010 as a pirate on 98.1 MHz. The station received its concession in December 2016 and in March 2018, 15 months later, finally moved to its newly assigned frequency of 95.3.
