= XHRRA-FM =

Radio station in Fresnillo, Zacatecas

- Fresnillo, Zacatecas; Mexico
- Frequency: 91.1 MHz
- Branding: Stereo Fresnillo

Programming
- Format: Spanish adult hits

Ownership
- Owner: Grupo Radiofónico ZER; (Josefina Reyes Sahagún)

History
- First air date: August 1, 2012 (permit)
- Former frequencies: 106.1 MHz (2012-2024)

Technical information
- Class: A
- ERP: 3 kW
- HAAT: 28.6 m (94 ft)
- Transmitter coordinates: 23°10′29″N 102°52′12″W

Links
- Website: Grupo Radiofónico ZER

XHRRA-FM is a noncommercial radio station on 91.1 FM in Fresnillo, Zacatecas. The station is owned by Grupo Radiofónico Zer and carries a Spanish-language adult hits format known as Stereo Fresnillo.

== History ==
Logo on the 106.1 frequency

XHRRA was permitted on August 1, 2012. In April 2024, XHRRA-FM was moved from 106.1 MHz to 91.1 MHz in order to clear 106-108 MHz for community and indigenous stations, as a condition of the renewal of its concession authorized in December 2023.
