= XHSU-FM (Chihuahua) =

Radio station in Chihuahua, Chihuahua, Mexico

- Chihuahua, Chihuahua; Mexico
- Frequency: 106.1 MHz
- Branding: El Lobo

Programming
- Format: Top 40 (CHR)

Ownership
- Owner: Sistema Radio Lobo; (Comunicación Canal 106, S.A. de C.V.)
- Sister stations: XHLO-FM

History
- First air date: December 11, 1972 (concession)
- Call sign meaning: Salvador Uranga (original concessionaire)

Technical information
- Licensing authority: CRT
- Class: B
- ERP: 40,000 watts
- HAAT: 1.4 m (4 ft 7 in)

Links
- Website: www.ellobo106.com

XHSU-FM is a radio station in Chihuahua, Chihuahua, Mexico. Broadcasting on 106.1 FM, XHSU is known as El Lobo and carries a Top 40 (CHR) format.

== History ==
After the petition was made for an FM station in Chihuahua in 1966 and Salvador Uranga was approved to operate a station on 95.3 MHz in 1968, Salvador Uranga received the concession for XHSU late in 1972. Salvador was the brother of Ramiro Uranga, who owned three AM radio stations in the city.

In the 1980s, the station was affiliated to the OIR syndication arm of Grupo Radio Centro; in 1993, the concession transferred to Frecuencia Modulada del Chuviscar, S.A. de C.V. Today, it carries some programming from MVS Radio but not either of its national formats. The station jingles are in English while most of the programming is in Spanish.

Some of the notable programs that air are American Top 40 with Ryan Seacrest (Saturday and Monday nights), the World Chart Show with Lara Scott (Sunday afternoons), Richard J. Dalton (Saturday nights), and the House of Hair with Dee Snider (Sunday nights).

On August 22, 2018, the IFT approved the transfer of the station's concession to Comunicación Canal 106, S.A. de C.V.
