= KZUA =

Coordinates: 34.920°N 110.132°W

Holbrook, Arizona; United States
- Broadcast area: Northeast Arizona
- Frequency: 92.1 MHz
- Branding: Z92

Programming
- Format: Country

Ownership
- Owner: Petracom of Holbrook, LLC

Technical information
- Licensing authority: FCC
- Class: C1
- ERP: 100,000 watts
- HAAT: 78.0 meters (255.9 ft)

Links
- Public license information: Public file; LMS
- Webcast: Listen Live
- Website: 921kzua.com

KZUA (92.1 FM, "Z92") is a commercial radio station in Holbrook, Arizona, United States. It is owned by Petracom of Holbrook, LLC (a subsidiary of Petracom Media). The station broadcasts a country music format to Northeast Arizona. In January 2011, KZUA began simulcasting on KZUZ (93.5 FM Show Low)
