= XHAH-FM =

Radio station in Juchitán de Zaragoza, Oaxaca

Juchitán de Zaragoza, Oaxaca; Mexico
- Frequency: 90.1 FM
- Branding: Radio Hit

Programming
- Format: Romantic/Pop

Ownership
- Owner: CMI Oaxaca; (Radiodifusoras Unidas del Sureste, S.A.)
- Sister stations: XHTEKA-FM

History
- First air date: October 1, 1968 (concession)

Technical information
- ERP: 25 kW
- Transmitter coordinates: 16°27′22″N 95°01′46″W

Links
- Webcast: Listen live
- Website: encuentroradiotv.com

XHAH-FM is a radio station on 90.1 FM in Juchitán de Zaragoza, Oaxaca, Mexico. It is part of CMI, the media company owned by the López Lena family, and is known as Radio Hit.

== History ==
XEAH-AM received its concession on October 1, 1968. It was owned by Elida Haydee Campos Calvo and broadcast with 500 watts on 1330 kHz. It was sold to its current concessionaire in 1991 and moved to 1180 kHz in December 1995.

XEAH received approval to migrate to FM in 2010. Until the mid-2010s, it carried the Exa FM pop format from MVS Radio; at that time, it switched to the Encuentro news/talk format run on other CMI stations before flipping to the Vox Love Station romantic format from Radiópolis in October 2020. This was abandoned in March 2023, with the station becoming known as Radio Hit.
