= KZUZ =

- Show Low, Arizona; United States
- Frequency: 93.5 MHz
- Branding: Wild West Country

Programming
- Format: Country music

Ownership
- Owner: Petracom of Holbrook, LLC

History
- First air date: September 13, 1964
- Former call signs: KVWM-FM (1964–1998); KSNX (1998–2010)

Technical information
- Licensing authority: FCC
- Facility ID: 17337
- Class: C3
- ERP: 25,000 watts
- HAAT: 45.0 meters (147.6 ft)
- Transmitter coordinates: 34°13′14″N 110°1′49″W

Links
- Public license information: Public file; LMS
- Website: KZUZ website

KZUZ (93.5 FM) is a radio station licensed to Show Low, Arizona, United States. The station is currently owned by Petracom of Holbrook, LLC. It has a country music format simulcast with KZUA in Holbrook.
