= KKBI =

- Broken Bow, Oklahoma; United States
- Broadcast area: Idabel, Oklahoma
- Frequency: 106.1 MHz
- Branding: Best Country 106

Programming
- Format: Country music
- Affiliations: Westwood One Radio Network, ABC Radio

Ownership
- Owner: Jay and Laura Lindly; (JL Radio LLC)
- Sister stations: KQIB

Technical information
- Licensing authority: FCC
- Facility ID: 8782
- Class: C2
- ERP: 17,000 watts
- HAAT: 249.0 meters (816.9 ft)
- Transmitter coordinates: 34°14′45.00″N 94°46′58.00″W

Links
- Public license information: Public file; LMS
- Webcast: listen live
- Website: KKBI FM

KKBI (106.1 FM) is a radio station broadcasting a country music format. The station is licensed to Broken Bow, Oklahoma, United States, and is owned by Jay and Laura Lindley, through licensee JL Radio LLC. KKBI features programming from Westwood One Radio Network and ABC Radio.
