= XHTUT-FM =

Indigenous radio station in Villa de Tututepec de Melchor Ocampo, Oaxaca

Villa de Tututepec de Melchor Ocampo, Oaxaca; Mexico
- Frequency: 106.1 FM
- Branding: Estéreo Lluvia

Programming
- Format: Community

Ownership
- Owner: Comunidad Indígena Mixteca de San Pedro Tututepec

History
- First air date: 2002 (unlicensed); 26 April 2017 (with concession)
- Call sign meaning: TUTutepec

Technical information
- Class: A
- ERP: 0.483 kW
- HAAT: 159.6 meters
- Transmitter coordinates: 16°07′40.6″N 97°36′04.3″W

XHTUT-FM is an indigenous radio station on 106.1 FM in Villa de Tututepec de Melchor Ocampo, Oaxaca. It is known as Estéreo Lluvia ("Stereo Rain"); its concession is held by the Mixtec indigenous community of San Pedro Tututepec.

== History ==
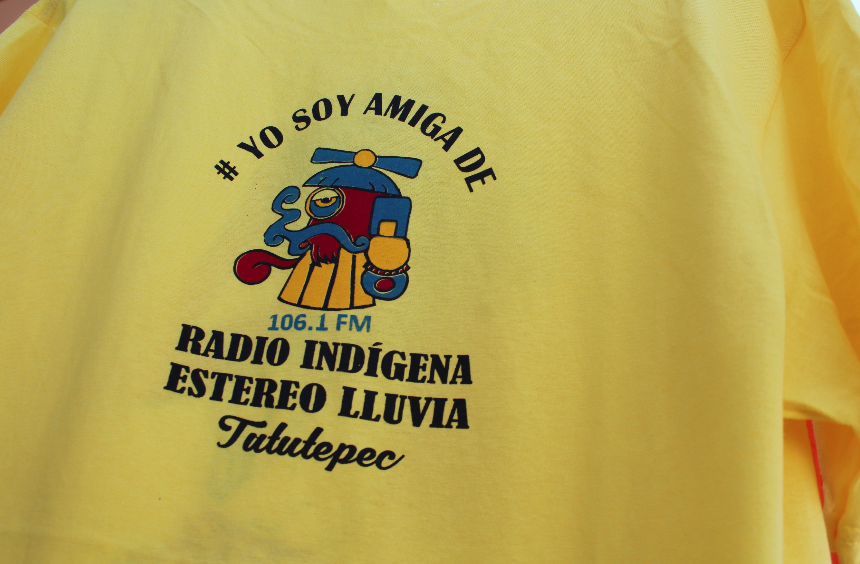
"I'm a Friend of Estéreo Lluvia" T-shirt

Estéreo Lluvia has been broadcasting in one form or another since 2002, initially on 103.5 MHz. Its founders had previously hosted shows at XEJAM in Santiago Jamiltepec. The name for the station came from a contest; the winning entry drew from the fact that the Mixtec people are known as the pueblo de la lluvia (People of the Rain). Attempts to obtain a permit legally were met by denials alleging a radio station could not be economically or technically viable, and when a legal action was turned away, Estéreo Lluvia began unlicensed operations. Operating in this manner exposed the station to potential raids by federal police. The first came either in 2002 or 2003 and saw members of the Federal Police break down the door to the municipal government offices in order to seize the station's assets. By April 2004, the station was back on air, broadcasting from a new building; additionally, a civil association had been set up to hold the station's assets.

In 2006, federal police returned to Tututepec to raid Estéreo Lluvia. At the time, a host was on the air, and she had time to alert the residents to the police action; within minutes, hundreds of residents surrounded the federal police forces and managed to recover most of the seized station equipment.

In March 2017, Estéreo Lluvia received a concession for an indigenous radio station to operate on 106.1 MHz, within the Article 90 reserved band for community and indigenous stations; it also received the callsign XHTUT-FM at this time.
