= KOZI (AM) =

- Chelan, Washington; United States
- Frequency: 1230 kHz
- Branding: Radio Lake Chelan

Programming
- Format: News/talk
- Affiliations: [Seattle Mariners Radio Network]

Ownership
- Owner: (AudioSphere LLC)
- Sister stations: KOZI-FM, KZAL

History
- First air date: March 1, 1957

Technical information
- Licensing authority: FCC
- Facility ID: 49370
- Class: C
- Power: 1,000 watts
- Transmitter coordinates: 47°51′00″N 120°00′20″W

Links
- Public license information: Public file; LMS
- Webcast: Listen Live
- Website: kozi.com

KOZI (1230 kHz) is an AM radio station broadcasting a news/talk format. Licensed to Chelan, Washington, United States, the station is currently owned by licensee AudioSphere LLC.
