= XHTEKA-FM =

Radio station in Juchitán de Zaragoza, Oaxaca, Mexico

Juchitán de Zaragoza, Oaxaca; Mexico
- Frequency: 91.7 FM
- Branding: Radio Teka

Programming
- Format: Salsa-Tropical

Ownership
- Owner: CMI Oaxaca; (Bertha Cruz Toledo)
- Sister stations: XHAH-FM

History
- First air date: March 27, 1960
- Call sign meaning: Radio TECA

Technical information
- ERP: 25 kW
- Transmitter coordinates: 16°27′22″N 95°01′46″W

Links
- Webcast: Listen live
- Website: encuentroradiotv.com

XHTEKA-FM is a radio station on 91.7 FM in Juchitán de Zaragoza, Oaxaca, Mexico. It is part of CMI, the media company owned by the López Lena family, and known as Radio Teka.

== History ==
XECA-AM 1480, based in Ciudad Ixtepec, received its concession on March 19, 1960 and signed on eight days later. It was owned by José Becerra Flores. It was sold to Bertha Cruz Toledo de López Lena in 1982 and moved to 1430 kHz. It moved again to 1030 and to Juchitán, this time as 500-watt XETEKA-AM, in January 1996.

XETEKA received approval to migrate to FM in 2010.
