= Geronimo FM =

Geronimo FM is a youngsters hits radio based in Yogyakarta, Indonesia. It first went on-air as a pirate station called Gembel Rapi in 1968. Geronimo got its license in 1971 and May 31 was selected as its official start date. The station was, at first, an AM station on 1602 kHz and has since retained its top hits format. In 5 March 1990, Geronimo was the first station in Yogyakarta to move to FM on 105.8. That was after the Indonesian government opened the frequency for commercial radio stations, but in 2003 Indonesia's Communications Minister issued a decree in the FM Radio Frequency Master Plan that forced Geronimo to move to 106.1 FM.
