= KYXE =

- Union Gap, Washington; United States
- Broadcast area: Yakima, Washington
- Frequency: 104.9 MHz
- Branding: La Zeta

Programming
- Language: Spanish
- Format: Regional Mexican

Ownership
- Owner: Amador Bustos; (Bustos Media Holdings, LLC)
- Sister stations: KZXR-FM, KZTA, KMNA

History
- First air date: October 10, 2012

Technical information
- Licensing authority: FCC
- Facility ID: 183328
- Class: A
- ERP: 680 watts
- HAAT: 297 meters
- Transmitter coordinates: 46°30′48″N 120°24′03″W

Links
- Public license information: Public file; LMS
- Webcast: Listen Live
- Website: laradiodeaqui.com

KYXE (104.9 FM) is a radio station broadcasting to the Yakima, Washington area, licensed to serve Union Gap.

== History ==
In 2012, KYXE was the first station in the country to begin playing all Christmas music, doing so on October 10.

On January 7, 2013, an application was filed with the Federal Communications Commission indicating that the station had fallen silent. As of October 2013, the station has returned to the air with Christmas music.

On November 27, 2013, KYXE changed their format to Spanish religious, branded as "La Estacion de Familia".

On October 13, 2017, KYXE changed their format to regional Mexican, branded as "La Zeta". (info taken from stationintel.com). Per the FCC application, Bustos Media operated the station under a Time Brokerage Agreement prior to Bustos acquiring the license for $215,500 effective May 14, 2018.
