= XHDCA-FM =

Community radio station in Miahuatlán de Porfirio Díaz, Oaxaca, Mexico

Miahuatlán de Porfirio Díaz, Oaxaca; Mexico
- Frequency: 100.5 FM
- Branding: Estéreo Dinastia

Programming
- Format: Community radio

Ownership
- Owner: Colectivo Oaxaqueño para la Difusión de la Cultura y las Artes, A.C. (Codiculta)
- Sister stations: XHEJU-FM (Ejutla de Crespo)

History
- First air date: May 2018 (on 100.5 MHz)
- Former frequencies: 91.3 (as a pirate)
- Call sign meaning: Colectivo Oaxaqueño para la Difusión de la Cultura y las Artes

Technical information
- Class: A
- ERP: 3 kW
- HAAT: -164.3 m
- Transmitter coordinates: 16°19′42″N 96°35′46″W

Links
- Webcast: XHDCA-FM on Facebook

XHDCA-FM is a community radio station on 100.5 FM in Miahuatlán de Porfirio Díaz, Oaxaca. It is known as Estéreo Dinastia and owned by the civil association Colectivo Oaxaqueño para la Difusión de la Cultura y las Artes, A.C.

== History ==
XHDCA began broadcasting as a pirate on 91.3 MHz. The station received its concession in December 2016, and in May 2018, 17 months later, it finally moved to its newly assigned frequency of 100.5.
