= KXCL =

- Rock Creek Park, Colorado; United States
- Frequency: 101.7 MHz

Programming
- Format: Contemporary Christian music

Ownership
- Owner: Calvary Chapel Aurora

Technical information
- Licensing authority: FCC
- Facility ID: 164277
- Class: A
- ERP: 2,100 watts
- HAAT: −9.0 meters (−29.5 ft)
- Transmitter coordinates: 38°43′11″N 104°43′16″W

Links
- Public license information: Public file; LMS
- Webcast: Listen live
- Website: gracefm.com

KXCL (101.7 FM) is a radio station licensed to Rock Creek Park, Colorado, United States. The station is currently owned by Calvary Church with Ed Taylor. The station received approval from the Federal Communications Commission on November 1, 2013, to change its city of license from Westcliffe, Colorado, to Rock Creek Park (southwest of Colorado Springs) and increase its power from 180 watts to 2,100 watts to serve the Colorado Springs area.

Calvary Chapel Aurora agreed to purchase KXCL from United States CP, LLC for $400,000. The purchase was consummated on October 31, 2013. Calvary plans to use KXCL to bring its "Grace FM" programming from KXGR into the Colorado Springs market.
