= KKVR =

Radio station in Kerrville, Texas

- Kerrville, Texas; United States
- Broadcast area: Ingram, Texas; Harper, Texas
- Frequency: 106.1 MHz
- Branding: The River 106.1

Programming
- Format: Classic hits

Ownership
- Owner: Lyndell Grubbs; (Radio Ranch, Ltd.)
- Sister stations: KRNH

History
- First air date: 2007

Technical information
- Licensing authority: FCC
- Facility ID: 164166
- Class: A
- ERP: 6,000 watts
- HAAT: 100 meters (330 ft)
- Transmitter coordinates: 30°02′27″N 99°10′19″W

Links
- Public license information: Public file; LMS
- Webcast: Listen live
- Website: theriver1061.com

KKVR (106.1 FM, "The River") is a radio station broadcasting a classic hits format. Licensed to Kerrville, Texas, the station is owned by Lyndell Grubbs, through licensee Radio Ranch, LLC.
