= XHPHUA-FM =

Radio station in Huajuapan de León, Oaxaca

Huajuapan de León, Oaxaca; Mexico
- Frequency: 100.1 FM
- Branding: Hits 100.1 FM

Programming
- Format: Full-service

Ownership
- Owner: Enza Telecom, S.A. de C.V.
- Sister stations: XHPNOC-FM Asunción Nochixtlán, XHPCRU-FM Salina Cruz

History
- First air date: December 20, 2018
- Call sign meaning: HUAjuapan de León

Technical information
- Class: A
- ERP: 3 kW
- HAAT: -158.2 m
- Transmitter coordinates: 17°48′40.24″N 97°46′33.41″W

Links
- Website: XHPHUA-FM on Facebook

XHPHUA-FM is a radio station on 100.1 FM in Huajuapan de León, Oaxaca, known as Hits 100.1 FM.

== History ==
XHPHUA was awarded in the IFT-4 radio auction of 2017. The station began testing in October 2018 and was formally inaugurated on December 20 of that year.
