= KXGR =

- Loveland, Colorado; United States
- Broadcast area: Denver-Fort Collins-Greeley
- Frequency: 89.7 MHz
- Branding: 89.7 GRACEfm

Programming
- Format: Contemporary Christian music

Ownership
- Owner: Calvary Chapel Aurora

History
- First air date: 2005
- Former call signs: KXWA (2004–2010)
- Call sign meaning: "Grace"

Technical information
- Licensing authority: FCC
- Facility ID: 89401
- Class: C0
- ERP: 80,000 watts (vert.); 100 watts (horiz.)
- HAAT: 372 meters (1,220 ft)
- Transmitter coordinates: 40°37′3″N 105°19′40″W
- Translator: 101.7 K299AO (Sterling)

Links
- Public license information: Public file; LMS
- Webcast: Listen live
- Website: gracefm.com

KXGR (89.7 FM, "GRACEfm") is a noncommercial radio station broadcasting a Christian format. Licensed to Loveland, Colorado, United States, it serves Northern Colorado including Fort Collins-Greeley and the Denver-Boulder metropolitan area. Programming is simulcast on 101.7 KXCL in Rock Creek Park, Colorado, which serves Colorado Springs, and on low-power FM translator 101.7 K299AO in Sterling, Colorado. The stations are owned by Calvary Church with Ed Taylor.

KXGR and KXCL air a mix of Christian contemporary music and programs on Christian teaching from national and local religious leaders.

== History ==
On March 11, 2004, the station received a construction permit to begin work from the Federal Communications Commission. It had the call sign KXWA and was owned by the WAY-FM Media Group. Way-FM is a chain of Contemporary Christian music stations. The station signed on the following year.

In December 2010, the station was transferred to Calvary Church with Ed Taylor (formerly "Calvary Chapel Aurora") to start a different religious radio network. The call letters changed to KXGR.
