= KZXR-FM =

- Prosser, Washington; United States
- Frequency: 101.7 MHz
- Branding: La Zeta

Programming
- Format: Regional Mexican

Ownership
- Owner: Amador and Rosalie Bustos; (Bustos Media Holdings, LLC)
- Sister stations: KYXE, KZTA, KMNA

History
- First air date: September 6, 1962
- Former call signs: KACA (1963–1992); KZXR (1992–1998); KZXR-FM (1998–2000); KMNA (2000–2006); KLES (2006–2017)

Technical information
- Licensing authority: FCC
- Facility ID: 6266
- Class: C3
- ERP: 3,500 watts
- HAAT: 265 meters (869 ft)
- Transmitter coordinates: 46°11′12″N 119°45′13″W

Links
- Public license information: Public file; LMS
- Webcast: Listen Live
- Website: laradiodeaqui.com

KZXR-FM (101.7 FM) is a radio station broadcasting a regional Mexican music format. Licensed to Prosser, Washington, United States, the station is currently owned by Amador and Rosalie Bustos' Bustos Media, through licensee Bustos Media Holdings, LLC.

== History ==
The station was assigned the call letters KACA on February 3, 1963. The station has since held a number of call signs over its history, changing to KZXR on May 20, 1992, to KZXR-FM on September 14, 1998, to KMNA on June 16, 2000, to KLES on May 25, 2006, and to KZXR-FM again on October 11, 2017.
