= KZTA =

- Naches, Washington; United States
- Broadcast area: Yakima, Washington
- Frequency: 96.9 MHz
- Branding: La Gran D

Programming
- Format: Regional Mexican

Ownership
- Owner: Amador and Rosalie Bustos; (Bustos Media Holdings, LLC)
- Sister stations: KYXE, KMNA, KZXR-FM

History
- First air date: 1987 (as KRKN)
- Former call signs: KRKN (1986–1988); KYKA (1988–1996)

Technical information
- Licensing authority: FCC
- Facility ID: 36006
- Class: C2
- ERP: 14,000 watts
- HAAT: 285 meters
- Transmitter coordinates: 46°35′59.00″N 120°52′8.00″W

Links
- Public license information: Public file; LMS
- Webcast: Listen Live
- Website: laradiodeaqui.com

KZTA (96.9 FM) is a radio station broadcasting a Regional Mexican format. Licensed to Naches, Washington, United States, the station serves the Yakima area. The station is currently owned by Amador and Rosalie Bustos, through licensee Bustos Media Holdings, LLC.

== History ==
The station went on the air as KRKN on 1986-11-25. on 1988-10-26, the station changed its call sign to KYKA, on 1996-12-09 to the current KZTA,

Bustos Media used to own the station. In September 2010, Bustos transferred most of its licenses to Adelante Media Group as part of a settlement with its lenders.

Effective December 10, 2014, Bustos Media repurchased KZTA from Adelante Media, along with eight other stations and a translator, for $6 million.
