= XHYAT-FM =

Community radio station in Ciudad Ixtepec, Oaxaca

Ciudad Ixtepec, Oaxaca; Mexico
- Broadcast area: Ixtepec, Comitancillo, Juchitán, Ixtaltepec, Santo Domingo Chihuitán and Santiago Laollaga
- Frequency: 94.1 FM
- Branding: Oaxaca Radio

Programming
- Format: Community radio

Ownership
- Owner: Yati Ne Casti, A.C.

History
- First air date: 2019
- Call sign meaning: YATi Ne Casti

Technical information
- Class: A
- ERP: 3 kW
- HAAT: -9 m
- Transmitter coordinates: 16°32′51.3″N 95°05′09.4″W

Links
- Website: XHYAT-FM on Facebook

XHYAT-FM is a community radio station on 94.1 FM in Ciudad Ixtepec, Oaxaca. It is known as Oaxaca Radio and owned by the civil association Yati Ne Casti, A.C.

== History ==
Yati Ne Casti applied for a new community radio station on November 30, 2015. The Federal Telecommunications Institute approved the application on November 15, 2017.
