= KOZI-FM =

- Chelan, Washington; United States
- Frequency: 93.5 MHz
- Branding: KOZI FM 93.5

Programming
- Format: Adult contemporary

Ownership
- Owner: (AudioSphere LLC)
- Sister stations: KOZI, KZAL

History
- First air date: August 26, 1981

Technical information
- Licensing authority: FCC
- Facility ID: 49366
- Class: A
- ERP: 600 watts
- HAAT: 316 meters (1,037 ft)
- Transmitter coordinates: 47°51′2.00″N 119°52′26.00″W
- Translators: 100.9 K265AX (Chelan and Manson); 103.1 K276CY (Manson); 103.1 K276CT (Twisp); 103.1 K276BY (Pateros)

Links
- Public license information: Public file; LMS
- Webcast: Listen Live
- Website: kozi.com

KOZI-FM (93.5 MHz) is a radio station broadcasting an adult contemporary music format. Licensed to Chelan, Washington, United States, the station is currently owned by licensee AudioSphere LLC.
