= KGIG-LP =

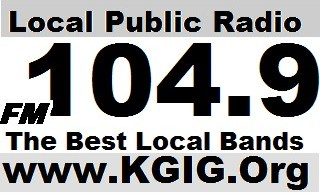
- Modesto, California; United States
- Frequency: 104.9 MHz
- Branding: 104.9 The Gig

Programming
- Format: Community, talk

Ownership
- Owner: Fellowship of the Earth

History
- First air date: 2005
- Former call signs: KQRP-LP (2003–2012)

Technical information
- Licensing authority: FCC
- Facility ID: 123802
- Class: L1
- ERP: 100 watts
- HAAT: 6.0 meters (19.7 ft)
- Transmitter coordinates: 37°42′29.1″N 121°06′10.6″W

Links
- Public license information: LMS
- Webcast: Listen live
- Website: valleymedia.org/kgig

KGIG-LP (104.9 FM, "104.9 The Gig") is a low-power FM radio station broadcasting a talk format with some music programming devoted to local bands. Licensed to Modesto, California, United States, the station is currently owned by Fellowship of the Earth.

== History ==
The Federal Communications Commission issued a construction permit for the station on June 30, 2003. The station was assigned the KQRP-LP call sign on July 10, 2003, and received its license to cover on May 2, 2005. On April 17, 2012, the station changed its call sign to the current KGIG-LP.
