= XHEDI-FM =

Oaxaca de Juárez-San Sebastián Tutla, Oaxaca; Mexico
- Frequency: 106.1 FM
- Branding: Stereo Uno

Programming
- Format: Community radio

Ownership
- Owner: Esperanza, Destino e Identidad Global, A.C.

History
- First air date: November 12, 2018
- Call sign meaning: From the name of the concessionaire, Esperanza, Destino e Identidad Global

Technical information
- Class: A
- ERP: 1.8 kW
- HAAT: -38.7 m
- Transmitter coordinates: 17°04′22″N 96°43′57.5″W

Links
- Website: stereounoradio.com

XHEDI-FM is a community radio station on 106.1 FM in Oaxaca de Juárez, Oaxaca, in Mexico. It is known as Stereo Uno and owned by the civil association Esperanza, Destino e Identidad Global, A.C. Stereo Uno broadcasts from a transmitter in Santa Cruz Amilpas.

== History ==
Esperanza, Destino e Identidad Global was approved for its concession on October 4, 2017, after applying in November 2015. The station signed on November 12, 2018. It originally broadcast from Santa Cruz Amilpas before being approved to use Cerro el Fortín, a mountaintop home to major Oaxaca TV stations, in 2022.
