= KRZX =

- Redlands, Colorado; United States
- Frequency: 106.1 MHz
- Branding: KRZX 106.1 FM

Programming
- Format: Classic rock

Ownership
- Owner: Ted and Jana Tucker; (Cochise Media Licenses LLC)

History
- First air date: 2010

Technical information
- Licensing authority: FCC
- Facility ID: 164260
- Class: C3
- ERP: 870 watts
- HAAT: 383 metres (1,257 ft)
- Transmitter coordinates: 39°04′1″N 108°44′39″W

Links
- Public license information: Public file; LMS
- Website: krzxfm.com

KRZX (106.1 FM) is a radio station licensed to serve the community of Redlands, Colorado. The station is owned by Ted and Jana Tucker, through licensee Cochise Media Licenses LLC, and airs a classic rock format.

The station was assigned the KRZX call letters by the Federal Communications Commission on May 1, 2006.
