= XHGCY-FM =

Community radio station in Juchitán de Zaragoza, Oaxaca

- Juchitán de Zaragoza, Oaxaca; Mexico
- Frequency: 106.1 FM
- Branding: Órbita Digital

Programming
- Format: Community radio

Ownership
- Owner: Guna Caa Yuni Xhiña, A.C.

History
- First air date: 2017 (social community concession)
- Former frequencies: 90.9 FM, 92.5 FM (as a pirate)
- Call sign meaning: Guna Caa Yuni Xhiña

Technical information
- Class: A
- ERP: 2.16 kW
- HAAT: 33.6 m
- Transmitter coordinates: 16°26′52.1″N 95°01′15.8″W

Links
- Website: orbitadigital.com.mx

XHGCY-FM is a community radio station on 106.1 FM in Juchitán de Zaragoza, Oaxaca. It is known as Órbita Digital and owned by the civil association Guna Caa Yuni Xhiña, A.C.

== History ==
Órbita Digital operated as a pirate station until it was raided in November 2014 along with other unlicensed radio stations in the region. The Federal Telecommunications Institute (IFT) later imposed a fine.

In September 2017, weeks after a major earthquake struck Juchitán, the IFT approved a new social community radio concession for Órbita Digital (incorporated as Guna Caa Yuni Xhiña, A.C.). With the concession, the newly minted XHGCY-FM moved to 106.1 MHz.
