= XHPNOC-FM =

Radio station in Asunción Nochixtlán, Oaxaca

Asunción Nochixtlán, Oaxaca; Mexico
- Frequency: 96.5 FM
- Branding: Hits 96.5 FM

Programming
- Format: Full-service

Ownership
- Owner: Enza Telecom, S.A. de C.V.
- Sister stations: XHPHUA-FM Huajuapan de León, XHPCRU-FM Salina Cruz

History
- First air date: February 2019
- Call sign meaning: Asunción NOChixtlán

Technical information
- Class: A
- ERP: 3 kW
- HAAT: -56.3 m
- Transmitter coordinates: 17°27′39.3″N 97°13′29.7″W

Links
- Website: XHPNOC-FM on Facebook

XHPNOC-FM is a radio station on 96.5 FM in Asunción Nochixtlán, Oaxaca, known as Hits 96.5 FM.

== History ==
XHPNOC was awarded in the IFT-4 radio auction of 2017. The station began operations in February 2019.
