= KZAL =

- Manson, Washington; United States
- Broadcast area: Wenatchee, Washington
- Frequency: 94.7 MHz
- Branding: 94.7 The Bull

Programming
- Format: Classic country

Ownership
- Owner: (AudioSphere LLC)
- Sister stations: KOZI, KOZI-FM

History
- First air date: 2007

Technical information
- Licensing authority: FCC
- Facility ID: 162412
- Class: C3
- ERP: 10,300 watts
- HAAT: 158 meters
- Transmitter coordinates: 47°51′16.00″N 120°9′59.00″W

Links
- Public license information: Public file; LMS
- Webcast: Listen Live
- Website: 947thebull.com

KZAL (94.7 FM) is a Radio station broadcasting a classic country music format. Licensed to Manson, Washington, United States, the station serves the Lake Chelan and Greater Wenatchee area. KZAL is known as "94.7 The Bull". The station is currently owned by licensee AudioSphere LLC.

In July 2026, KZAL relaunched with a shift from country to classic country as "94.7 The Bull".
