= KFXE (FM) =

Radio station in Ingram, Texas

Coordinates: 30°07′04″N 99°11′40″W

- Ingram, Texas; United States
- Broadcast area: Kerrville, Texas
- Frequency: 96.5 MHz
- Branding: 96.5 and 93.9 The Raptor

Programming
- Format: Classic rock

Ownership
- Owner: Lyndell Grubbs; (Radio Ranch, LLC)

History
- First air date: 2007
- Former call signs: KAKI (2006–2007); KEVE (2007–2008); KSYY (2008–2013); KKGN (2013–2016)

Technical information
- Licensing authority: FCC
- Facility ID: 164252
- Class: C3
- ERP: 8,400 watts
- HAAT: 131 meters (430 ft)
- Translator: 93.9 K230AL (Boerne)
- Repeater: 92.3-3 KRNH-HD3

Links
- Public license information: Public file; LMS
- Webcast: Listen live
- Website: theraptorrocks.com

KFXE 96.5 FM is a radio station licensed to Ingram, Texas. The station broadcasts a classic rock music format and is owned by Lyndell Grubbs, through licensee Radio Ranch, LLC.

KFXE began broadcasting in 2007 and held the call sign KEVE. In July 2008, the station changed its call sign to KSYY and the station aired a hot adult contemporary format as Sunny 96.5. In September 2013, the station adopted the call sign KKGN, and began airing its current Country music format as 96 Gun. On April 13, 2016, the station changed its call sign to the current KFXE.

On July 1, 2024, KFXE changed their format from country to classic rock, branded as "96.5/93.9 The Raptor".
