= WSUB-LP =

- Baton Rouge, Louisiana; United States
- Frequency: 106.1 MHz
- Branding: The Bluff

Programming
- Format: Urban gospel, hip-hop, R&B

Ownership
- Owner: Louisiana Community Development Capital Fund
- Operator: Southern University

History
- First air date: October 2003
- Former call signs: WTQT-LP (2004–2025)
- Former frequencies: 94.9 MHz (2004–2013)
- Call sign meaning: Southern University/Bluff

Technical information
- Licensing authority: FCC
- Facility ID: 124366
- Class: L1
- ERP: 71 watts
- HAAT: 35.5 meters
- Transmitter coordinates: 30°26′58.00″N 91°9′24.00″W

Links
- Public license information: LMS
- Website: wsub.org

WSUB-LP (106.1 FM) is a low-power FM radio station in Baton Rouge, Louisiana, United States. It is owned by the Louisiana Community Development Capital Fund and operated by students at Southern University as "The Bluff", airing gospel, hip-hop, R&B and pop music.

WTQT-LP began broadcasting on 94.9 MHz in October 2003 from space in a studio on Government Street. Station equipment at the site fit inside the former vault of Pelican Savings and Loan. It aired gospel music, soul and R&B music and at launch had two on-air personalities, Guy Brody and A. B. Welch, both familiar in local radio. Welch had been the morning host at KQXL-FM for 17 years before being replaced with a syndicated show. WTQT-LP moved to 3313 Government Street in 2009 and relaunched as a gospel-based station.

In 2025, operation of the station came under the aegis of Southern University under an agreement with the Louisiana Community Development Capital Fund. The station changed call signs from WTQT-LP to WSUB-LP and became known as "The Bluff", airing a student-produced format of gospel, hip-hop, R&B and pop music.
