= KEXS-FM =

Ravenwood, Missouri; United States
- Frequency: 106.1 MHz

Programming
- Format: Religious

Ownership
- Owner: Catholic Radio Network

History
- First air date: 1972

Technical information
- Licensing authority: FCC
- Facility ID: 165948
- Class: C2
- ERP: 50,000 watts
- HAAT: 129.0 meters (423.2 ft)
- Transmitter coordinates: 40°25′15″N 94°43′20″W

Links
- Public license information: Public file; LMS

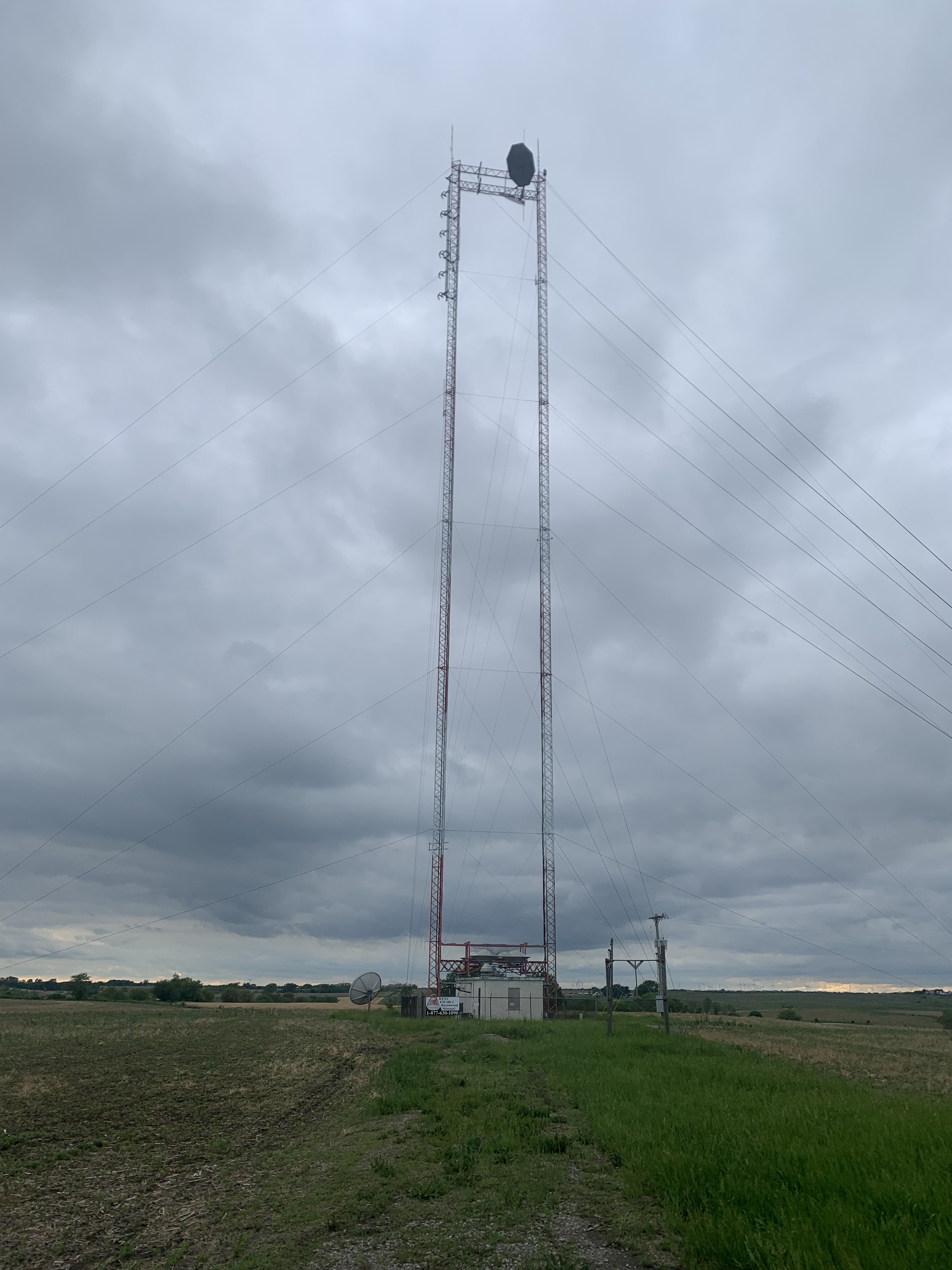
KEXS-FM tower

KEXS-FM (106.1 FM) is a radio station licensed to Ravenwood, Missouri, United States, broadcasting a religious format. The station is currently owned by Catholic Radio Network.
