= KZFN =

- Moscow, Idaho; United States
- Broadcast area: Moscow-Pullman area
- Frequency: 106.1 MHz
- Branding: Z-Fun 106

Programming
- Format: Contemporary hit radio
- Affiliations: Compass Media Networks; Premiere Networks

Ownership
- Owner: Inland Northwest Broadcasting

History
- First air date: August 1985

Technical information
- Licensing authority: FCC
- Facility ID: 35560
- Class: C1
- ERP: 63,000 watts
- HAAT: 281 meters (922 ft)
- Transmitter coordinates: 46°40′51″N 116°58′26″W

Links
- Public license information: Public file; LMS
- Website: inlandnwbroadcasting.com/radio-products/kzfn

KZFN (106.1 FM, "ZFun 106") is a radio station based in Moscow, Idaho. KZFN launched in August 1985 and serves Moscow, Pullman, Washington, and the Lewiston–Clarkston metropolitan area.

The transmitter and tower, located on Paradise Ridge (just south of Moscow), provides coverage to the north, west, and south. It has an effective radiated power of 63,000 watts and covers the Palouse listening area, centered in Moscow and nearby Pullman, Washington. To the east, the broadcast signal is limited by the Bitterroot mountain range. Until early 2008, KZFN was also carried on K237DP-FM 95.3 FM, a 34-watt broadcast translator in the "Tri-Cities" of Richland, Pasco, and Kennewick. The simulcast of the station ended due to the sale of the translator.
