= WCWI =

- Adams, Wisconsin; United States
- Broadcast area: Wisconsin Dells, Wisconsin
- Frequency: 106.1 MHz
- Branding: Wisconsin 106

Programming
- Format: Variety
- Affiliations: Premiere Networks

Ownership
- Owner: Marcus Jaeger; (Heart of Wisconsin Media, LLC)

History
- First air date: October 8, 1993 (as WDKM)
- Former call signs: WDKM (1992–2014)

Technical information
- Licensing authority: FCC
- Facility ID: 57267
- Class: A
- ERP: 6,000 watts
- HAAT: 100 meters (328 feet)
- Transmitter coordinates: 43°57′29.00″N 89°49′43.00″W

Links
- Public license information: Public file; LMS
- Webcast: Listen Live
- Website: wisconsin106.com

WCWI (106.1 FM) is a radio station broadcasting a variety format. Licensed to Adams, Wisconsin, United States, the station was built by original owners Roche-a-Cri Broadcasting. It is currently owned by Marcus Jaeger, through licensee Heart of Wisconsin Media, LLC.

In May 2009, the then-WDKM dropped the K106 branding and switched to an adult hits format. The station changed its call sign to WCWI on January 21, 2014.

On May 17, 2020, WCWI changed to its current variety format.
