= KWSB-FM =

- Gunnison, Colorado; United States
- Broadcast area: Gunnison area
- Frequency: 91.1 MHz

Programming
- Format: Variety hits

Ownership
- Owner: Western Colorado University

History
- First air date: January 26, 1968
- Former frequencies: 91.9 MHz

Technical information
- Licensing authority: FCC
- Class: A
- ERP: 135 watts
- HAAT: 91 meters (299 ft)
- Transmitter coordinates: 38°31′22″N 106°54′28″W

Links
- Public license information: Public file; LMS
- Webcast: Listen live
- Website: kwsb.org

KWSB-FM (91.1 FM) is a college radio station licensed to Gunnison, Colorado, United States, and based at Western Colorado University. The station has been in continuous operation since January 1968 and recently celebrated its 40th anniversary with alumni and former staff. For a long period throughout the 1970s, it was the only station in the Gunnison area that played popular music, that is, played more than simply country music. This reputation for free and hip music gives it notoriety among students and locals. It has one of the largest vinyl collections in the state collegiate radio station system. Members have received multiple awards for excellent broadcasting from the Colorado Broadcasters Association over the years and is considered a major asset to the university. The station provides non-commercial service to Gunnison and relies on the communications budget and local underwriting to stay afloat. The staff is made up entirely of students and is advised by a professor in the communications department. The station is also known as "The Penguin" and phonetic "Quizbee" by students and staff. The station provides live DJing experience to any students who take the Communication and Theatre 261 course, and provides news to the community.

== History ==
On January 26, 1968 KWSB was born. It was created to fulfill the need for sports broadcasting, as well as provide listeners with folk, jazz, easy listening, and rock and roll. KWSB offered news and weather from the UPI Teletype service and Educational programming from the Intercollegiate Broadcasting System. Special Feature shows consisted of classical, music, dramatic and literary productions, as well as local talent, editorials, debates, lectures, panel discussions, and call-in shows. The staff was 11 strong including the first station manager, Jack Rickards. KWSB's signal was originally 10 watts from the basement of the old College Union on the frequency 91.9, with an antenna on the roof of Taylor Hall. In the beginning, DJs were on the air from 4pm until midnight, seven days a week.

In March 2026, station manager Lorena Ayala announced that KWSB will cease broadcasting on FM and transition to streaming-only.
