= KYCM =

- Alamogordo, New Mexico; United States
- Frequency: 89.9 MHz

Programming
- Format: Religious

Ownership
- Owner: Your Christian Companion Network, Inc.

Technical information
- Licensing authority: FCC
- Facility ID: 93483
- Class: C3
- ERP: 800 watts
- HAAT: 497 meters (1632 feet)
- Transmitter coordinates: 32°49′47″N 105°53′13″W

Links
- Public license information: Public file; LMS
- Webcast: Listen Live
- Website: http://www.kycc.org/

KYCM (89.9 FM) is a radio station licensed to serve Alamogordo, New Mexico. The station is owned by Your Christian Companion Network, Inc. It airs a Religious radio format.

The station was assigned the KYCM call letters by the Federal Communications Commission on May 26, 2006.
