= KWYR-FM =

South Dakota radio station

- Winner, South Dakota; United States
- Broadcast area: Winner, South Dakota
- Frequency: 93.7 MHz
- Branding: Magic 93

Programming
- Format: Mainstream rock

Ownership
- Owner: Midwest Radio Corp.

History
- First air date: November 25, 1971

Technical information
- Licensing authority: FCC
- Facility ID: 42109
- Class: C1
- ERP: 100,000 watts
- HAAT: 171 meters
- Transmitter coordinates: 43°17′46″N 99°52′2″W

Links
- Public license information: Public file; LMS
- Webcast: Listen Live
- Website: kwyr.com

KWYR-FM (93.7 FM) is a radio station broadcasting a broad rock music format. Licensed to Winner, South Dakota, United States. The station is currently owned by Midwest Radio Corp.

== History ==
KWYR commenced its AM operation on September 27, 1957 from studios on the second floor of the Wally Laudenslager building at the corner of Second and Polk streets in Winner, SD. Its transmitter building and 176' tower were located just one mile (1.6 km) north of town on city property. The owners were a Nebraska optometrist and two Nebraska broadcasters.

In the summer of 1958 the station was purchased by a group of investors from Winner, South Dakota and the Black Hills, headed by Al Clark of Rapid City, who had been a radio-TV personality there for the previous ten years. In the summer of 1962, KWYR moved its studios to the former McCormick Hardware building on the station's fifth birthday. In the summer of 1967, the company celebrated its tenth anniversary by moving its transmitting facilities to its own 10-acre (40,000 m^{2}) site, three miles (5 km) west on Highway 18 in Winner, South Dakota. The new building there included an emergency studio, restroom facilities, and an engine room with a standby generator to provide operating power during extended power outages. The new tower at the site was 100 feet (30 m) taller than the previous.

In early 1971, the FM station was launched, transmitting from a 500-watt tower on Rock Hill south of Winner. With a power of 100,000 watts, and broadcasting in stereo, KWYR gave South Dakota its first nighttime radio service.

The station is formerly an affiliate of ABC News Radio in the 1980s. KWYR went under MOR and Top 40/CHR formats throughout the years.

Previously known to thousands of listeners as "Sound One Radio," the KWYR stations have been Number One in many ways. They brought central South Dakota and Nebraska their first wide-area AM radio station, their first stations with a national network, the first FM station between Rapid City and Sioux Falls, the first high powered nighttime radio service, the first coverage area wide coverage of high school sporting events, the first coverage of NCAA sports, the first coverage of the Indianapolis 500 race... and the first with ABC radio network and Paul Harvey News.

On May 1, 2017 KWYR-FM changed their format from hot adult contemporary to a rock music mix, still branded as "Magic 93".
