= KWCQ =

- Condon, Oregon; United States
- Frequency: 106.1 MHz
- Branding: 107.3 The Beat

Programming
- Format: Adult Top 40
- Affiliations: Cumulus Media

Ownership
- Owner: Jeffery Huffman; (Jacobs Radio Programming)
- Sister stations: KLKY

History
- First air date: 2008 (as KHAL at 93.5)
- Former call signs: KHAL (2005–2009)
- Former frequencies: 93.5 MHz (2008–2011)

Technical information
- Licensing authority: FCC
- Facility ID: 164221
- Class: C1
- ERP: 17,000 watts
- HAAT: 279.1 meters (916 ft)
- Transmitter coordinates: 45°14′09″N 120°18′09″W
- Translators: 107.3 K297BE (Kennewick, WA)

Links
- Public license information: Public file; LMS

KWCQ (106.1 FM, "The Beat") is an American radio station licensed to serve the community of Condon, Oregon, United States. The station is currently owned by Jeffery Huffman, through licensee Jacobs Radio Programming, and features a Hot AC format using programming from Cumulus Media's Today's Best Hits network. Until falling silent in June 2011, the station broadcast an adult contemporary music format and featured programming from Dial Global.

== History ==
In 2005, NT Radio LLC applied to the Federal Communications Commission (FCC) for a construction permit for a new broadcast radio station. The FCC granted this permit on June 9, 2005, with a scheduled expiration date of June 9, 2008. The new station was assigned call sign "KHAL" on June 3, 2005. After construction and testing were completed, the station was granted its broadcast license on September 2, 2008. The station changed its call sign to KWCQ on May 18, 2009.

The station fell temporarily dark on June 9, 2011. In its filing with the FCC seeking authorization to remain silent for up to six months, the station asserted that it had "been unable to generate sufficient revenue to cover basic operating costs" and that they would attempt to "restructure the operation" and seek "new financing".

On July 13, 2012 KWCQ returned to the air with hot adult contemporary, branded as "103.1 Star FM", the frequency used in the branding is for translator K276EE 103.1 FM The Dalles, Oregon.

On October 15, 2012, KWCQ relaunched as "The Beat" as a result of a sale from Haystack Broadcasting to Jacobs Radio Programming. The sale was consummated on April 24, 2013 at a purchase price of $12,500.

== Translators ==
KWCQ programming is also carried on a broadcast translator station to extend or improve the coverage area of the station on 107.3 FM in Kennewick, Washington. There is a construction permit with the FCC to move the translator frequency to 106.9 MHz.

Call sign	Frequency	City of license	FID	ERP (W)	Class	FCC info
K297BE	107.3 FM	Kennewick, Washington	156733	50	D	LMS
