= KWKM (FM) =

- St. Johns, Arizona; United States
- Frequency: 95.7 MHz
- Branding: Power 95.7

Programming
- Format: Hot adult contemporary
- Affiliations: ABC Radio

Ownership
- Owner: KM Communications; (Km Radio of St. Johns, L.L.C.)

Technical information
- Licensing authority: FCC
- Facility ID: 78436
- Class: C0
- ERP: 100,000 watts
- HAAT: 363.5 meters (1,193 ft)
- Transmitter coordinates: 34°14′58″N 109°35′11″W

Links
- Public license information: Public file; LMS
- Webcast: Listen Live
- Website: kwkm.com

KWKM (95.7 FM) is a radio station broadcasting a hot adult contemporary format. It is licensed to St. Johns, Arizona, United States. The station is owned by Km Radio of St. Johns, L.L.C. and features programming from ABC Radio.
