= KWKZ =

Radio station in Cape Girardeau, Missouri

Coordinates: 37.061°N 89.624°W

- Cape Girardeau, Missouri; United States
- Frequency: 106.1 FM
- Branding: C106

Programming
- Format: Talk show

Ownership
- Owner: Fred Dockins; (Dockins Broadcast Group, LLC)

Technical information
- Licensing authority: FCC
- Class: C2
- ERP: 34,000 watts
- HAAT: 178 meters

Links
- Public license information: Public file; LMS

KWKZ (106.1 FM, "C106") is a radio station with studios located in Cape Girardeau, Missouri.
