= KXBX-FM =

- Lakeport, California; United States
- Frequency: 98.3 MHz

Programming
- Format: Hot adult contemporary
- Affiliations: Westwood One

Ownership
- Owner: Bicoastal Media Licenses, LLC

History
- First air date: December 14, 1984

Technical information
- Licensing authority: FCC
- Facility ID: 49198
- Class: A
- ERP: 4,800 watts
- HAAT: 112 meters (367 ft)
- Transmitter coordinates: 39°2′56.37″N 122°46′6.96″W

Links
- Public license information: Public file; LMS
- Webcast: Listen live
- Website: kxbxfm.com

KXBX-FM (98.3 FM) is a radio station broadcasting a hot adult contemporary format. Licensed to Lakeport, California, United States, the station is currently owned by Bicoastal Media Licenses, LLC and features programming from Westwood One.

== History ==
Former logo

The station went on the air as KXBX on 1984-12-14.
