= KZKZ-FM =

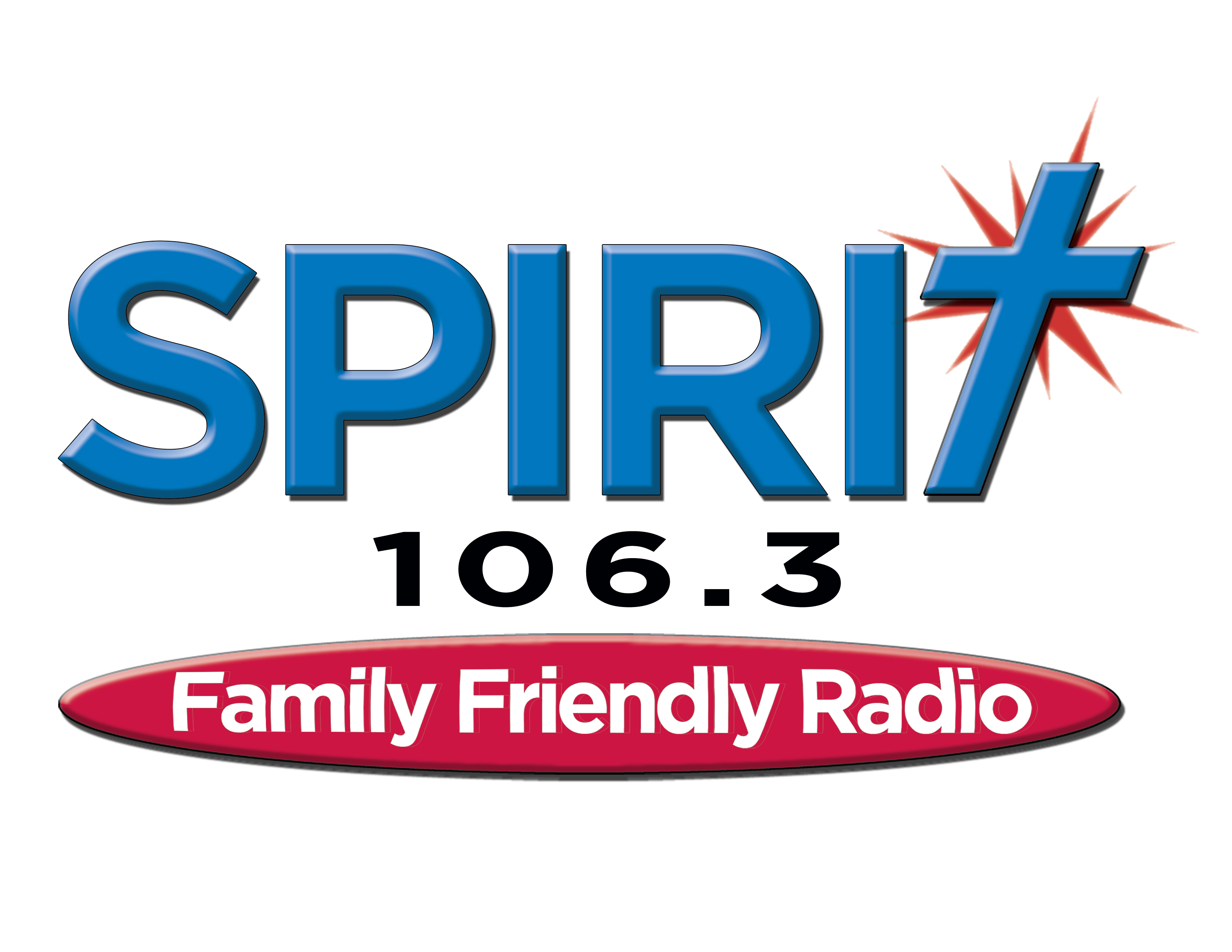
- Greenwood, Arkansas; United States
- Broadcast area: Fort Smith, Arkansas
- Frequency: 106.3 MHz
- Branding: Spirit FM 106.3

Programming
- Format: Christian Contemporary

Ownership
- Owner: Family Communications, Inc.
- Sister stations: KBHN

History
- First air date: August 7, 1989
- Former call signs: KAJJ, KZKZ

Technical information
- Licensing authority: FCC
- Facility ID: 20611
- Class: C3
- ERP: 15,000 watts
- HAAT: 121 meters (397 feet)
- Transmitter coordinates: 35°13′44″N 94°15′45″W

Links
- Public license information: Public file; LMS
- Webcast: http://www.kzkzfm.com/listenonline
- Website: http://www.kzkzfm.com/

KZKZ-FM is a radio station licensed to serve Greenwood, Arkansas, United States. The station is owned by Family Communications, Inc. It airs a Christian Contemporary music format.

The station was assigned the KZKZ-FM call letters by the Federal Communications Commission on August 7, 1989.
