= KXDJ =

- Spearman, Texas; United States
- Broadcast area: Amarillo, Texas
- Frequency: 98.3 MHz

Programming
- Format: Country

Ownership
- Owner: Chris Samples

History
- Former call signs: KBMF-FM (1963–1978); KRDF-FM (1978–2005)

Technical information
- Licensing authority: FCC
- Facility ID: 61684
- Class: C2
- ERP: 17,500 Watts
- HAAT: 255.0 meters (836.6 ft)
- Transmitter coordinates: 36°3′44.00″N 101°1′56.00″W

Links
- Public license information: Public file; LMS
- Website: http://www.kxdjradio.com

KXDJ (98.3 FM) is an American radio station broadcasting a country music format. It is licensed to Spearman, Texas, United States, and serves the Amarillo area. The station is owned by Chris Samples.
