= KYVZ =

- Atwood, Kansas; United States
- Frequency: 106.1 MHz
- Branding: Super Hits 106.1

Programming
- Format: Classic hits

Ownership
- Owner: Joseph J. Vyzourek

History
- First air date: 2016

Technical information
- Licensing authority: FCC
- Facility ID: 191550
- Class: C1
- ERP: 60,000 watts
- HAAT: 108 metres (354 ft)
- Transmitter coordinates: 39°47′3″N 101°15′46″W

Links
- Public license information: Public file; LMS
- Website: www.kyvzradio.com

KYVZ (106.1 FM) is a radio station licensed to serve the community of Atwood, Kansas. The station is owned by Joseph J. Vyzourek, and airs a classic hits format.

The station was assigned the KYVZ call letters by the Federal Communications Commission on March 14, 2014.
