= KWCK-FM =

- Searcy, Arkansas; United States
- Broadcast area: Searcy; Heber Springs; Batesville; Mountain View
- Frequency: 99.9 MHz

Programming
- Format: Country music

Ownership
- Owner: Crain Media Group, LLC

Technical information
- Licensing authority: FCC
- Facility ID: 11744
- Class: C2
- ERP: 50,000 watts
- HAAT: 150 meters (490 ft)
- Transmitter coordinates: 35°26′51″N 91°56′52″W

Links
- Public license information: Public file; LMS
- Webcast: Listen live
- Website: kwck999.com

KWCK-FM is a radio station airing a country music format licensed to Searcy, Arkansas, broadcasting on 99.9 FM. The station serves the areas of Searcy, Heber Springs, Batesville and Mountain View, and is owned by Crain Media Group, LLC.
