= KWUF-FM =

- Pagosa Springs, Colorado; United States
- Frequency: 106.1 MHz
- Branding: The Wolf

Programming
- Format: Adult hits

Ownership
- Owner: Wolf Creek Broadcasting, LLC

History
- First air date: 1986
- Former call signs: KRQS (1984–1997)
- Former frequencies: 106.3 MHz (1986–2013)

Technical information
- Licensing authority: FCC
- Facility ID: 51286
- Class: C3
- ERP: 500 watts
- HAAT: 389 meters (1,276 ft)
- Transmitter coordinates: 37°11′32″N 107°5′55″W

Links
- Public license information: Public file; LMS
- Website: kwuf.com/fm1063.html

KWUF-FM (106.1 FM) is a radio station licensed to Pagosa Springs, Colorado, United States. The station is currently owned by Wolf Creek Broadcasting, LLC.

== History ==
The station was assigned the call letters KRQS on 1984-09-12. On 1997-05-16, the station changed its call sign to the current KWUF-FM.

On December 13, 2013, KWUF-FM moved from 106.3 FM to 106.1 FM.
