= 106.9 FM =

FM radio frequency

The following radio stations broadcast on FM frequency 106.9 MHz:

== Argentina ==
- Mix in Capitán Bermudez, Santa Fe

== Australia ==
- Hill FM in Broken Hill, New South Wales
- Nova 106.9 in Brisbane, Queensland
- Hit106.9 Newcastle in Newcastle, New South Wales
- TUNE! FM in Armidale, New South Wales
- VOX FM in Wollongong, New South Wales

== Brazil ==
- Omega FM 106.9 in São Paulo.

== Canada (Channel 295) ==
- CBAF-FM-19 in Urbainville, Prince Edward Island
- CBL-FM-1 in Huntsville, Ontario
- CBN-FM in St. John's, Newfoundland and Labrador
- CBU-FM-6 in Quesnel, British Columbia
- CFYT-FM in Dawson City, Yukon
- CHKA-FM in Schefferville, Quebec
- CHMA-FM in Sackville, New Brunswick
- CHRQ-FM in Restigouche, Quebec
- CHWF-FM in Nanaimo, British Columbia
- CIBX-FM in Fredericton, New Brunswick
- CIMO-FM-1 in Sherbrooke, Quebec
- CIXX-FM in London, Ontario
- CJHP-FM in High Prairie, Alberta
- CKJF-FM in Quebec City, Quebec
- CKKC-FM in Nelson, British Columbia
- CKKF-FM in Fairview, Alberta
- CKOB-FM in Trois-Rivieres, Quebec
- CKQB-FM in Ottawa, Ontario
- VF2320 in Fording River Mine, British Columbia
- VF2547 in Cawston, British Columbia
- VF7353 in Saskatoon, Saskatchewan

== China ==
- CNR Business Radio in Rizhao

== Malaysia ==
- Sinar in Sandakan, Sabah
- Suria in Kedah, Perlis & Penang

== Mexico ==
- XHAC-FM in Aguascalientes, Aguascalientes
- XHAPU-FM in Tepeapulco, Hidalgo
- XHAQ-FM in Agua Prieta, Sonora
- XHCVC-FM in Cuernavaca, Morelos
- XHERIO-FM in Ixtlán del Río, Nayarit
- XHERU-FM in Chihuahua, Chihuahua
- XHGUA-FM in Guaymas, Sonora
- XHHT-FM in Ignacio Zaragoza, Tlaxcala
- XHJON-FM in Jonuta, Tabasco
- XHPJ-FM in Monterrey, Nuevo León
- XHQT-FM in Veracruz, Veracruz
- XHREL-FM in Morelia, Michoacán
- XHSCCA-FM in Mexico City
- XHSCCT-FM in Jocotitlán, State of Mexico
- XHSCCQ-FM in La Huerta, Jalisco
- XHSOM-FM in Tlacolula de Matamoros, Oaxaca
- XHVMT-FM in Santiago Juxtlahuaca, Oaxaca

== New Zealand ==
- Various low-power stations up to 1 watt

== Philippines ==
- DXGR in Cotabato City

== South Korea ==
- FEBC FM in Seoul Metropolitan Area

== United Kingdom ==
- 106.9 SFM in Sittingbourne
- BFBS Catterick
- Drystone Radio in Cowling, North Yorkshire
- Gulshan Radio in Wolverhampton
- Heart Hertfordshire in Welwyn Garden City, Letchworth Garden City, Hatfield, Ware, Hertford, Hitchin and Baldock.
- Heart North & Mid Wales in Mold and Flint
- Humber Wave Radio in Hull
- Nation Radio Scotland in Helensburgh
- NLive Radio in Northampton
- Cheshire's Silk Radio in Macclesfield, Cheshire
- Takeover Radio in Sutton-in-Ashfield

== United States (Channel 295) ==
- KAGA-LP in San Angelo, Texas
- KARP-FM in Dassel, Minnesota
- KASS in Casper, Wyoming
- KAZE in Ore City, Texas
- KBGL in Larned, Kansas
- KBRS in Belle Rose, Louisiana
- KCCJ-LP in Batesville, Arkansas
- KCPK-LP in Pine Mountain Club, California
- KCST-FM in Florence, Oregon
- KDGL in Yucca Valley, California
- KDRX in Laughlin AFB, Texas
- KEDG in Alexandria, Louisiana
- KEGK in Wahpeton, North Dakota
- KFRC-FM in San Francisco, California
- KFSE in Kasilof, Alaska
- KGCA-LP in Tumon, Guam
- KHEN-LP in Salida, Colorado
- KHPP-LP in Sterlington, Louisiana
- KHPT in Conroe, Texas
- KHRT-FM in Minot, North Dakota
- KHTT in Muskogee, Oklahoma
- KIGI in Iguigig, Alaska
- KIHK in Rock Valley, Iowa
- KKRB in Klamath Falls, Oregon
- KKYN-FM in Plainview, Texas
- KLGD in Stamford, Texas
- KLUB in Bloomington, Texas
- KMOK in Lewiston, Idaho
- KMRG-LP in Pahrump, Nevada
- KMVE in California City, California
- KMZK in Clifton, Colorado
- KOOV in Kempner, Texas
- KOPW in Plattsmouth, Nebraska
- KPPV in Prescott Valley, Arizona
- KQLB in Los Banos, California
- KRGW in Fairbanks, Alaska
- KRNO in Incline Village, Nevada
- KROC-FM in Rochester, Minnesota
- KRVF in Kerens, Texas
- KRWM in Bremerton, Washington
- KSCY in Four Corners, Montana
- KTIJ in Elk City, Oklahoma
- KTPK in Topeka, Kansas
- KTXY in Jefferson City, Missouri
- KUDV in Bloomfield, Iowa
- KVGQ in Overton, Nevada
- KWEC-LP in Saint Charles, Missouri
- KWRY in Pueblo, Colorado
- KWYI in Kawaihae, Hawaii
- KXFE in Dumas, Arkansas
- KXIO in Clarksville, Arkansas
- KYHO-LP in Poplar Bluff, Missouri
- KYXK in Gurdon, Arkansas
- KZZG-LP in Hugo, Oklahoma
- WAFX in Suffolk, Virginia
- WAXE-LP in St. Albans, West Virginia
- WBIS-LP in Winterville, North Carolina
- WBPT in Homewood, Alabama
- WBQX in Thomaston, Maine
- WCCC (FM) in Hartford, Connecticut
- WDML in Woodlawn, Illinois
- WEXR in Stonewall, Mississippi
- WEZX in Scranton, Pennsylvania
- WFSC-LP in Florence, South Carolina
- WGSW in Americus, Georgia
- WHKL in Crenshaw, Mississippi
- WHRD in Freeport, Illinois
- WIIS in Key West, Florida
- WJDS-LP in Palm Coast, Florida
- WJHF-LP in Florence, Alabama
- WKVP in Camden, New Jersey
- WKXD-FM in Monterey, Tennessee
- WKZA in Lakewood, New York
- WLGE in Baileys Harbor, Wisconsin
- WLGX in Bedford, Virginia
- WLRU-LP in Hillsboro, Ohio
- WMEG in Guayama, Puerto Rico
- WMGU in Southern Pines, North Carolina
- WMIT in Black Mountain, North Carolina
- WMOZ in Moose Lake, Minnesota
- WNNO-FM in Wisconsin Dells, Wisconsin
- WOOA-LP in Albany, New York
- WOOD-FM in Muskegon, Michigan
- WPAK-FM in Tigerton, Wisconsin
- WPLL in Cross City, Florida
- WQTA-LP in Tampa, Florida
- WRBE-FM in Lucedale, Mississippi
- WRPG-LP in Pikeville, North Carolina
- WRQK-FM in Canton, Ohio
- WRXS in Brookfield, Wisconsin
- WSAE in Spring Arbor, Michigan
- WSCY in Moultonborough, New Hampshire
- WSRQ-FM in Zolfo Springs, Florida
- WVSQ in Renovo, Pennsylvania
- WSWT in Peoria, Illinois
- WSYR-FM in Solvay, New York
- WTTL-FM in Madisonville, Kentucky
- WUBB in Bluffton, South Carolina
- WUBN-LP in Wilson, North Carolina
- WUKL in Masontown, Pennsylvania
- WUPM in Ironwood, Michigan
- WVEZ in Saint Matthews, Kentucky
- WVTI in Brighton, Vermont
- WWEG in Myersville, Maryland
- WWSU in Fairborn, Ohio
- WWYN in Mckenzie, Tennessee
- WXXC in Marion, Indiana
- WYPO in Ocean City, Maryland
- WZAA-LP in Jeffersonville, Ohio
