= Media in Campbellton, New Brunswick =

Lists of newspapers, radio and television stations serving Campbellton, New Brunswick:

== Newspapers ==
- The Tribune (English weekly; published by Brunswick News)
- La Voix du Restigouche (French weekly; published by Brunswick News)
- L'Aviron (French weekly; published by Quebecor Media)

== Television ==
All stations are available on Rogers Cable, the local cable provider for Campbellton.

Campbellton and the surrounding area is not designated as a mandatory market for digital television conversion; only CHAU-TV, CFTF-DT and Télé-Québec announced their intentions to convert all their transmitters to digital, regardless of location. Since the digital conversion, CBC Television (via CBAT-DT) and Radio-Canada (via CBAFT-DT) have only been available on cable.

All stations are analog unless specified otherwise.

City of licence	Channel	Callsign	Network	Notes
Carleton, Quebec	5^{Digital}	CHAU-DT	TVA	
Campbellton	7	CKCD-TV	CTV Atlantic	Analogue satellite of CKCW-DT ch. 2 Moncton
Upsalquitch	12	CKAM-TV	CTV Atlantic	Analogue satellite of CKCW-DT ch. 2 Moncton
Carleton, Quebec	15^{Digital}	CIVK-DT	Télé-Québec	satellite of CIVM-DT ch. 17 Montreal
Carleton, Quebec	44^{Digital}	CFTF-DT-11	Noovo	satellite of CFTF-DT ch. 29 Rivière-du-Loup, Quebec

CHNB-DT, CJBR-DT, CBMT-DT and CTV Two Atlantic have also been available on cable for decades.

== Radio ==
Call sign	Frequency	City of License	Owner	Format
CBAL-FM-3	88.9 FM	Campbellton	Radio-Canada	Ici Musique (French)
CBAE-FM	90.5 FM	Campbellton	CBC	CBC Radio One
CBAF-FM-3	91.5 FM	Campbellton	Radio-Canada	Ici Radio-Canada Première (French)
CKNB-FM	100.7 FM	Campbellton	Maritime Broadcasting System	adult contemporary
CIMS-FM	103.9 FM	Balmoral	La Coopérative Radio Restigouche	community radio (French)
CFIC-FM	105.1 FM	Listuguj, Quebec	Micmac Historical Cultural Art Society	country
CHRQ-FM	106.9 FM	Listuguj, Quebec	Gespegewag Communications Society	First Nations community radio
