= List of television stations in New Brunswick =

This is a list of broadcast television stations serving cities in the Canadian province of New Brunswick.

City of licence	Analogue channel	Digital channel	Virtual channel	Callsign	Network	Notes
Boiestown	7			CKLT-TV-2	CTV	
Campbellton	7			CKCD-TV	CTV	satellite of CKCW-DT Moncton
Chatham	10			CKAM-TV	CTV	(Miramichi) satellite of CKCW-DT Moncton
Doaktown	10			CKAM-TV-4	CTV	satellite of CKCW-DT Moncton
Edmundston		42	42.1	CFTF-DT-1	Noovo	satellite of CFTF-DT Rivière-du-Loup Currently On Uhf 18
Edmundston		4	4.1	CIMT-DT-1	TVA	satellite of CIMT-DT Rivière-du-Loup
Florenceville	3			CKLT-TV-1	CTV	
Fredericton		31	4.1	CBAT-DT	CBC	
Fredericton		44	11.1	CHNB-DT-1	Global	Currently On Uhf 16
Kedgwick		27	3.1	CHAU-DT-11	TVA	satellite of CHAU-DT Carleton-sur-Mer, Quebec
Moncton		27	27.1	CHNB-DT-3	Global	
Moncton		29	2.1	CKCW-DT	CTV	
Moncton		11	11.1	CBAFT-DT	Ici Radio-Canada	
Miramichi	40			CHNB-TV-11	Global	
Miramichi River Valley	9			CKAM-TV-3	CTV	satellite of CKCW-DT Moncton
Newcastle	10			CKAM-TV-1	CTV	(Miramichi) satellite of CKCW-DT Moncton
Saint John		12	12.1	CHNB-DT	Global	
Saint John		9	9.1	CKLT-DT	CTV	
Saint-Quentin		31	31.1	CHAU-DT-11	TVA	satellite of CHAU-DT Carleton-sur-Mer, Quebec
St. Andrews		26	26.1	CHCO-TV	Ind	
St. Stephen	21			CHNB-TV-12	Global	
Tracadie		9	9.1	CHAU-DT-10	TVA	satellite of CHAU-DT Carleton-sur-Mer, Quebec
Upsalquitch	12			CKAM-TV	CTV	satellite of CKCW-TV Moncton
Woodstock	38			CHNB-TV-11	Global	

== See also ==
- List of television stations in Canada
- Lists of television stations in Atlantic Canada
- Media in Canada
