= CJCB =

CJCB may refer to:

- CJCB (AM), a radio station (1270 AM) licensed to Sydney, Nova Scotia, Canada
- CJCB-DT, a television station (channel 4) licensed to Sydney, Nova Scotia, Canada
- CKPE-FM, a radio station (94.9 FM) licensed to Sydney, Nova Scotia, Canada, which held the call sign CJCB-FM from 1957 to 1981
