= XHPIXT-FM =

Radio station in Asunción Nochixtlán, Oaxaca

Asunción Nochixtlán, Oaxaca; Mexico
- Frequency: 98.9 FM
- Branding: La Grandiosa de Nochixtlán

Ownership
- Owner: Vera Hernández family; (El Sol Nochixteco, S. de R.L. de C.V.)

History
- First air date: April 2018
- Call sign meaning: NochIXTlán

Technical information
- Class: A
- ERP: 3 kW

Links
- Website: XHPIXT-FM on Facebook

XHPIXT-FM is a radio station on 98.9 FM in Asunción Nochixtlán, Oaxaca. It is owned by the Vera Hernández family and is known as La Grandiosa de Nochixtlán.

== History ==
XHPIXT was awarded in the IFT-4 radio auction of 2017 and came to air in April 2018. The Vera Hernández family, which owns the concessionaires of XHPIXT-FM as well as XHPSEB-FM in Santiago Juxtlahuaca and XHPLEO-FM in Huajuapan de León, is involved in the leather business.
