= XHPSEB-FM =

Radio station in Santiago Juxtlahuaca, Oaxaca, Mexico

- Santiago Juxtlahuaca, Oaxaca; Mexico
- Frequency: 104.9 FM (HD Radio)
- Branding: La GranDiosa de Juxtlahuaca

Programming
- Format: Grupera

Ownership
- Owner: Vera Hernández family; (Los Ojos del Cielo, S. de R.L. de C.V.)
- Sister stations: XHVMT-FM

History
- First air date: June 2019
- Call sign meaning: San SEBastián Tecomaxtlahuaca

Technical information
- Class: A
- ERP: 3 kW
- HAAT: -423.2 m
- Transmitter coordinates: 17°20′08.6″N 98°00′52″W

XHPSEB-FM is a radio station on 104.9 FM in Santiago Juxtlahuaca, Oaxaca, Mexico. It is owned by the Vera Hernández family and is known as La GranDiosa de Huajuapan.

XHPSEB broadcasts from studios in Col. Jardín de la Soledad in Juxtlahuaca and shares its tower with co-owned XHVMT-FM 106.9, a community radio station, and XHPTEC-FM 99.1.

== History ==
XHPSEB was awarded in the IFT-4 radio auction of 2017 and came to air in June 2019 alongside XHVMT and XHPTEC. The Vera Hernández family, which owns the concessionaires of XHPIXT-FM as well as XHPLEO-FM in Huajuapan de León and XHPIXT-FM in Asunción Nochixtlán, is involved in the leather business.
