= CJCH =

CJCH is the callsign of two broadcast stations in Halifax, Nova Scotia, which had a common ownership until 1997 and have been commonly owned again since 2007:

- CJCH-FM ("101.3 Virgin Radio"), an FM radio station owned by Bell Media, formerly at 920 AM
- CJCH-DT, a television station owned by Bell Media and affiliated with the CTV television network
