= XHPLEO-FM =

Radio station in Huajuapan de León, Oaxaca

- Huajuapan de León, Oaxaca; Mexico
- Frequency: 88.5 FM
- Branding: La GranDiosa de Huajuapan

Programming
- Format: Regional Mexican

Ownership
- Owner: Vera Hernández family; (La Puerta de la Mixteca, S. de R.L. de C.V.)

History
- First air date: April 2018
- Call sign meaning: Huajuapan de LEÓn

Technical information
- Class: AA
- ERP: 3 kW
- HAAT: -34.1 m
- Transmitter coordinates: 17°48′23.4″N 97°48′31.0″W

Links
- Webcast: cento02.mipanelradio.com/..
- Website: lagrandiosa.mx

XHPLEO-FM is a radio station on 88.5 FM in Huajuapan de León, Oaxaca. It is owned by the Vera Hernández family and is known as La GranDiosa de Huajuapan, which offers a Regional Mexican format.

== History ==
XHPLEO was awarded in the IFT-4 radio auction of 2017 and came to air in April 2018. The Vera Hernández family, which owns the concessionaires of XHPIXT-FM as well as XHPSEB-FM in Santiago Juxtlahuaca and XHPIXT-FM in Asunción Nochixtlán, is involved in the leather business.
