= Fernando Cuéllar =

Fernando Cuéllar may refer to:

- Fernando Cuéllar (footballer) (1945–2008), Peruvian footballer and football manager
- Fernando Cuéllar Reyes (born 1963), Mexican politician
