= CIOO-FM =

Radio station in Halifax, Nova Scotia

Coordinates: 44°39′N 63°40′W

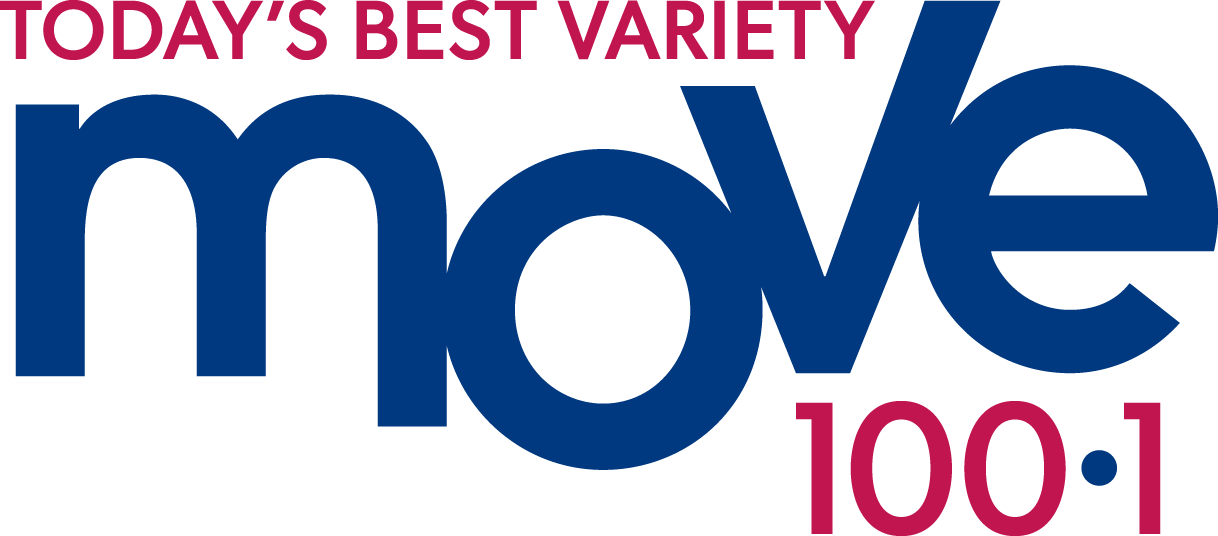
- Halifax, Nova Scotia; Canada
- Broadcast area: Halifax Regional Municipality
- Frequency: 100.1 MHz
- Branding: Move 100

Programming
- Format: Adult contemporary
- Affiliations: Premiere Networks

Ownership
- Owner: Bell Media; (Bell Media Radio)
- Sister stations: CJCH-FM, CJCH-DT

History
- First air date: November 1, 1977
- Call sign meaning: Looks similar to 100; station branded as C100

Technical information
- Class: C
- ERP: 100,000 watts
- HAAT: 185.1 metres (607 ft)

Links
- Webcast: Listen Live
- Website: iheartradio.ca/move/halifax

CIOO-FM is a Canadian adult contemporary formatted radio station, broadcasting at 100.1 FM in Halifax, Nova Scotia serving the Halifax Regional Municipality. The station uses the on-air brand name Move 100 and broadcasts an adult contemporary format switching to Christmas music for much of November and December. It was originally owned by Toronto based CHUM Limited until the company's buy-out by CTVglobemedia in 2007, and then Bell Media in 2011. CIOO's studios are located at the intersection of Russell and Agricola Streets in Halifax (right behind sister station CJCH-DT), with its transmitter located on Washmill Lake Drive in Clayton Park.

== History ==
In 1976, Radio 920, Ltd., a division of CHUM Limited, applied to the Canadian Radio-television and Telecommunications Commission for a new FM radio station broadcasting at 100,000 watts with a dial position of 100.1 MHz. This would be the third FM radio station in Halifax after FM stations CBH-FM and CHFX-FM. Radio 920, Ltd. also owned CTV affiliate CJCH-TV and CJCH-AM. The CRTC subsequently approved the application.

On November 1, 1977, CIOO began broadcasting as an easy listening station using the branding C100. As a new decade approached, CIOO changed its programming format to album rock. This gave listeners an opportunity to hear more than just the top 40 hits from a particular artist, such as other songs not yet on AM radio. In 1983, CHUM Limited tested a simulcast project with new TV station ASN by airing Atlantic Canada's Choice, counting down the week's best albums from 20 to 1 that was simulcast on both radio and TV and hosted by Geoff Banks. This lasted until spring 1985, where the station again reformatted its programming.

The spring of 1985 saw the station take on another programming angle, Top 40 along with oldies, such as The Beach Boys among others. This format was phased out not long after, when the station moved towards adult contemporary. The station utilized such slogans as "Lite Rock... Less Talk", "Great Light Rock Hits" and "...Even More Lite Rock Hits". CIOO moved to a Hot AC format in 1993. Like most hot AC stations in Canada, CIOO leaned rhythmic, though not as heavy as sister station CHUM-FM/Toronto. With sister station CJCH-FM adopting a Rhythmic/Dance Top 40 presentation by 2013, CIOO modified its playlist towards a conventional Adult Top 40 direction. New sister stations since 2013 are Truro-based CKTY-FM and CKTO-FM.

On December 21, 1984, CHUM Limited was denied a license to add an FM transmitter at 94.9 MHz in Middleton to rebroadcast the programming of CIOO.

On December 27, 2020, as part of a mass format reorganization by Bell Media, CIOO rebranded as Move 100, ending 43 years of the "C100" branding. While the station would run jockless for the first week of the format, on-air staff would return on January 4, 2021.

In 2022, CIOO flipped to adult contemporary.

== Features (as "C100") ==
- The Breakfast Club was the weekday morning program on CIOO. The show aired from 6:30am–10:00am, having extended from its old hours of 6:00am–9:00am. It was originally hosted by Kelly Latremouille, Peter Harrison and Moya Farrell until mid-2007. Latremouille had debuted with the station in the summer of 1993, replacing John Biggs, who took Latremouille's position with 92 CJCH AM at that time. After Latremouille's departure in late June 2007, Adam Marriott became an interim host along with Harrison and Farrell. On August 17, 2008, Brad Dryden joined the Breakfast Club as Latremouille's replacement. In August 2015, JC Douglas became Dryden's replacement on the Show. In January 2017, Melody Rose became Farrell's replacement after she retired from the station after 35 years. In November 2020, Douglas and Rose were released by Bell Media citing "programming changes". In January 2021, Erin Hopkins joined Peter Harrison on the MOVE 100 Morning Show.

Long before the Breakfast Club, the station used one DJ personality. Geoff Banks hosted the morning show for the better part of the 1980s, before Biggs took over and shortly thereafter.

- The Top 9 at 9 was a countdown of the day's most requested songs. It was heard each weekday morning and weeknight at 9:00. When this show first aired in 1993, it was the Top 7 at 7. Currently, it moved back to the latter name.
- Retro Request Sunday with Nicolle, heard every Sunday morning from 8am-noon, focused on music from the 1980s. When the 80's boom started its resurgence in 1995, CIOO ran the program from 8–10:00am on Saturday mornings. This time slot lasted for around 8 years, with the format sometimes running from 8:00 till noon.
- The Atlantic Canada Countdown with Matt & Deb was CIOO's weekly countdown of the most popular music of the week in Atlantic Canada. It was heard Sunday mornings from 8 to 10 AM.

CIOO formerly broadcast the radio version of the MuchMoreMusic countdown, but stopped airing it sometime in 2007.

- The C100 Summer Cruiser was a mobile prize machine team who broadcast their secret location around the Halifax Regional Municipality multiple times throughout the day all summer. Prizes varied every summer but have included free concert tickets, movie passes, museum passes, gift certificates, C100 "gear" and a chance to fill out a ballot to win a weekly prize or $1,000 prize. A later addition to the prize rotation were C100 window stickers. Although no official contest regarding the stickers had been announced, there was growing speculation that it would be something quite worthwhile.

CIOO branded itself as playing the most music for Halifax with:

- 100 Minutes of Commercial Free Music aired weekdays 9:00am – 10:40am.
- 60 Minutes of Commercial Free Drive Home aired weekdays 4:00pm – 5:00pm.
- 40 Minutes of Commercial Free Music aired every hour, every day.

Every Year on New Year's Eve, CIOO played the top 100 songs of the radio stations of that year.

== Former Logos ==
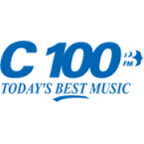
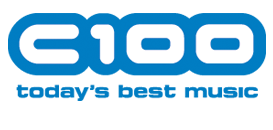
