= XHFM =

XHFM can refer to three Mexican broadcasting stations:

- XHFM-TV channel 2 in Veracruz, Veracruz
- XHFM-FM 94.9 in Veracruz, Veracruz
- XHFM-FM 94.1 in Mexico City, on the air from 1952 to 1957
