= Virgilio Caballero Pedraza =

Mexican journalist and federal deputy

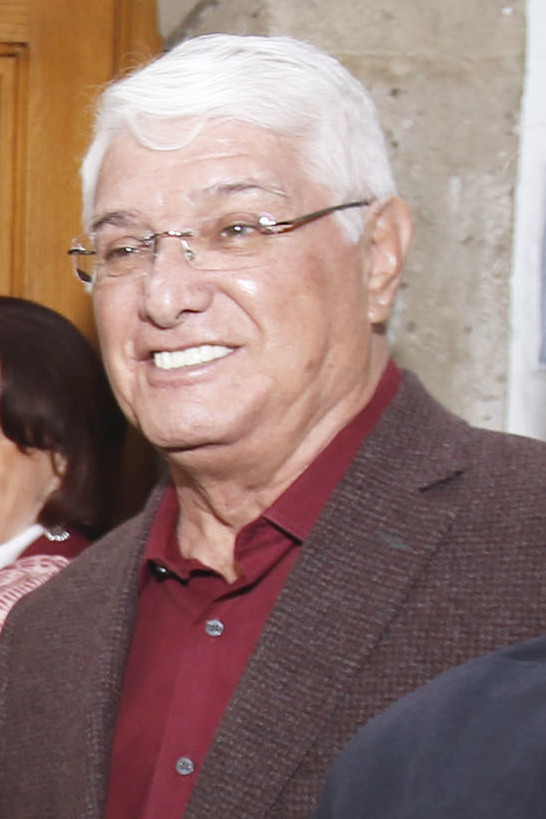
- Caballero in 2016

Deputy to the Congress of Mexico City from Azcapotzalco
- In office 17 September 2018 – 24 March 2019

Deputy to the Congress of the Union from Mexico City's 3rd district (Azcapotzalco)
- In office 29 August 2015 – 31 August 2018

Personal details
- Born: Virgilio Dante Caballero Pedraza; 24 February 1942 Tampico, Tamaulipas, Mexico
- Died: 25 March 2019 (aged 77) Mexico City, Mexico
- Party: MORENA
- Occupation: Politician, journalist

Virgilio Dante Caballero Pedraza (24 February 1942 – 25 March 2019) was a Mexican journalist, media researcher and politician. He served as a federal deputy from 2015 to 2018 in the 63rd Congress and as a deputy to the Congress of Mexico City, in addition to having enjoyed a long career in media.

== Early life and career ==
Caballero was born in Tampico, Tamaulipas, into a family of 11 children, moving to Mexico City at a young age and was a normal school teacher who also studied anthropology. However, he first fell in love with radio at the age of seven, when he participated in a kids' radio program at XEB, a station known as "La B Grande de México". As a professor of communications, he was instrumental in establishing the communications program at the Universidad Autónoma Metropolitana Cuajimalpa campus.

In 1977, Caballero began hosting a show on Canal Once and was eventually named the channel's director of news, the first in a series of public media leadership posts that Caballero would hold. In 1981, he was tapped to head Canal 13, at the time state-owned, leaving soon after to help establish and lead state broadcast systems in Sonora (1982–1984), Quintana Roo (1983–1988), and Oaxaca (1988–1992).

After a pair of two-year stints in the press offices of the Secretariat of Tourism and National Savings Bonds, Caballero returned to television in 1996, hosting the successful series Realidades for CNI Canal 40. In 1999, he became the first director of the new Canal del Congreso, a tenure that would make him a lightning rod for controversy. The head of the Chamber of Deputies, Beatriz Paredes Rangel, opted to remove Caballero from the post in 2002 after a series of controversial decisions, including covering demonstrations by striking teachers, placing former students of his in high-paying positions, and staging three straight hours of coverage of an EZLN event. Caballero remained active in journalism and communications, founding the Mexican Association for the Right to Information (AMEDI) in 2001 and hosting a program on TV UNAM from 2012 to 2014. In 2014, he was honored by the Universidad de Guadalajara with the Fernando Benítez Cultural Journalism Award.

=== Federal and local legislator ===
In 2014, Caballero became a founding member of the new National Regeneration Movement (MORENA) party. The next year, he was elected from Mexico City's third electoral district, in Azcapotzalco, to the Chamber of Deputies for the 63rd Congress. During his three years in San Lázaro, Caballero was a secretary on the Radio and Television Commission and also sat on the special commission set up to investigate the 2016 conflict in Nochixtlán, Oaxaca. While a legislator, Caballero's apartment was destroyed by the 2017 Mexico City earthquake.

After his three years in the federal legislature, Caballero successfully ran to represent a portion of Azcapotzalco in the Congress of Mexico City and became the spokesman for the MORENA caucus in the city legislature. After a brief illness, Caballero died on 25 March 2019.
