= XHPTEC-FM =

Radio station in Santiago Juxtlahuaca, Oaxaca

Santiago Juxtlahuaca, Oaxaca; Mexico
- Frequency: 99.1 FM
- Branding: G-Pop

Programming
- Format: Pop

Ownership
- Owner: Corporación Empresarial 2 Ríos, S. de R.L. de C.V.

History
- First air date: June 2019
- Call sign meaning: San Sebastián TEComaxtlahuaca

Technical information
- Class: A
- ERP: 3 kW
- HAAT: -427.6 m
- Transmitter coordinates: 17°20′08.6″N 98°00′52″W

XHPTEC-FM is a radio station on 99.1 FM in Santiago Juxtlahuaca, Oaxaca. It is owned by Corporación Empresarial 2 Ríos, S. de R.L. de C.V., and is known as G-Pop with a pop format.

XHPTEC shares its tower in Col. Jardín de la Soledad in Juxtlahuaca with XHVMT-FM 106.9, a community radio station, and XHPSEB-FM 104.9.

== History ==
XHPTEC was awarded in the IFT-4 radio auction of 2017 and came to air in June 2019 alongside XHVMT and XHPSEB, which are separately owned.
