= WHRD (disambiguation) =

WHRD is a radio station (106.9 FM) licensed to Freeport, Illinois.

WHRD may also refer to:

- WNRJ (AM), a radio station (1200 AM) licensed to Huntington, West Virginia, which held the call sign WHRD from 1987 to 2004
- WYCZ, a radio station (1030 AM) licensed to White Bluff, Tennessee, which held the call sign WHRD from 1985 to 1986
- Women human rights defenders, a designation for women who defend human rights
