= Kaga =

Kaga may refer to:

== Places ==
- Kaga, Ishikawa, a city in Japan.
- Kaga Province, an old province of Japan, now part of Ishikawa prefecture.
- Kaga Domain, an old feudal domain (han) in Kaga Province
- Kaga, Nigeria, a Local Government Area in Borno State, Nigeria
- Kaga, Afghanistan, in Nangarhar province
- Kaga, a parish with a 12th-century church, just north-west of Linköping, Sweden
- Kaga (village), a village in the district of Beloretsk, in Bashkortostan, Russia
- Kaga River, a river in Bashkortostan, Russia

== People ==
- Kaga Takeshi, better known as Chairman Kaga of Iron Chef.
- Shouzou Kaga, a Japanese video game designer.

== Other ==
- Japanese aircraft carrier Kaga, an aircraft carrier of the Imperial Japanese Navy, named after the province.
- JS Kaga (DDH-184), a helicopter carrier of the Japan Maritime Self-Defense Force, named after the province.
- KAGA-LP, a low-power radio station (106.9 FM) licensed to serve San Angelo, Texas, United States
