= XHVMT-FM =

Community radio station in Santiago Juxtlahuaca, Oaxaca

Santiago Juxtlahuaca, Oaxaca; Mexico
- Frequency: 106.9 FM
- Branding: Los Ojos del Cielo

Programming
- Format: Community radio

Ownership
- Owner: La Voz de la Mixteca, A.C.
- Sister stations: XHPSEB-FM

History
- First air date: June 2019
- Call sign meaning: La Voz de la MixTeca

Technical information
- Class: AA
- ERP: 6 kW
- HAAT: -425 m
- Transmitter coordinates: 17°20′08.6″N 98°00′52″W

XHVMT-FM is a community radio station on 106.9 FM in Santiago Juxtlahuaca, Oaxaca. It is owned by La Voz de la Mixteca, A.C., and is known as Los Ojos del Cielo.

XHVMT shares its tower in Col. Jardín de la Soledad in Juxtlahuaca with XHPSEB-FM 104.9, a commercial radio station won by the same Vera Hernández family that also owns part of XHVMT in the IFT-4 auction of 2017, and XHPTEC-FM 99.1.

== History ==
After filing for the station in 2015, XHVMT was approved for its concession on February 8, 2017. It would be more than two years, however, before the station came to air in June 2019.

XHVMT is the successor to a previous pirate community station, La Nueva 100.3, operated by the same principals from the same location. In February 2013, station director Jorge Alberto Vera Carrizal was found dead after being kidnapped two months prior.
