= Pablo Franco Hernández =

Mexican lawyer and politician

- Born: 28 April 1963 (age 63); Mexico City, Mexico
- Education: UNAM
- Occupations: Lawyer and politician
- Political party: PRD

Pablo Franco Hernández (born 28 April 1963) is a Mexican lawyer and politician affiliated with the Party of the Democratic Revolution. In 2003–2006 he served as a deputy in the LIX Legislature of the Mexican Congress representing the Federal District's third district.
