= Balfre Vargas Cortez =

Mexican politician

- Born: 30 January 1959; Mexico City, Mexico
- Died: 26 November 2020 (aged 61); Mexico City, Mexico
- Occupation: Politician
- Political party: PRD

Balfre Vargas Cortez (30 January 1959 – 26 November 2020) was a Mexican politician from the Party of the Democratic Revolution. From 2009 to 2012 he served as Deputy of the LXI Legislature of the Mexican Congress representing the Federal District's third district.

He was killed by COVID-19 in 2020.
