= 3rd federal electoral district of Mexico City =

Federal electoral district of Mexico

Mexico City's 3rd
- Electoral district of the Chamber of Deputies of Mexico

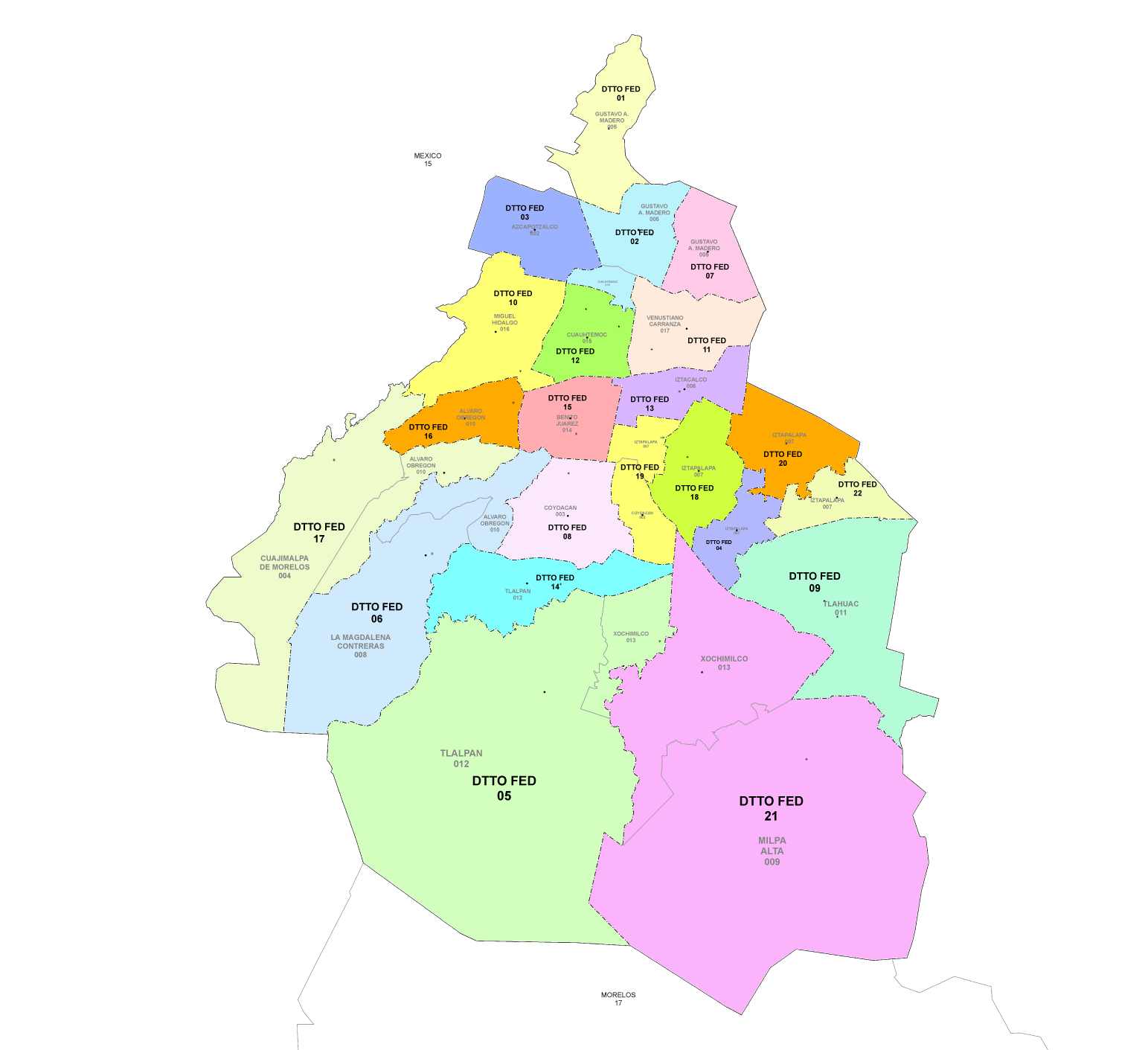
- 3rd district since 2023

Incumbent
- Member: Gabriela Jiménez Godoy
- Party: ▌Morena
- Congress: 66th (2024–2027)

District
- State: Mexico City
- Head town: Azcapotzalco
- Coordinates: 19°28′20″N 99°11′00″W
- Covers: Azcapotzalco
- PR region: Fourth
- Precincts: 187
- Population: 432,205 (2020 census)

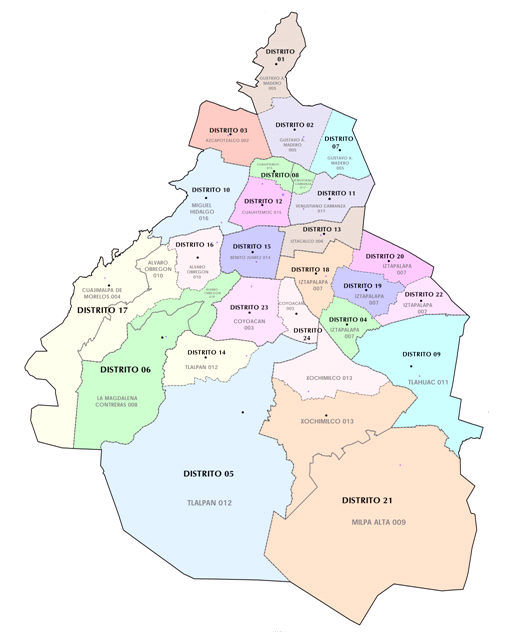
Mexico City under the 2017–2022 districting plan

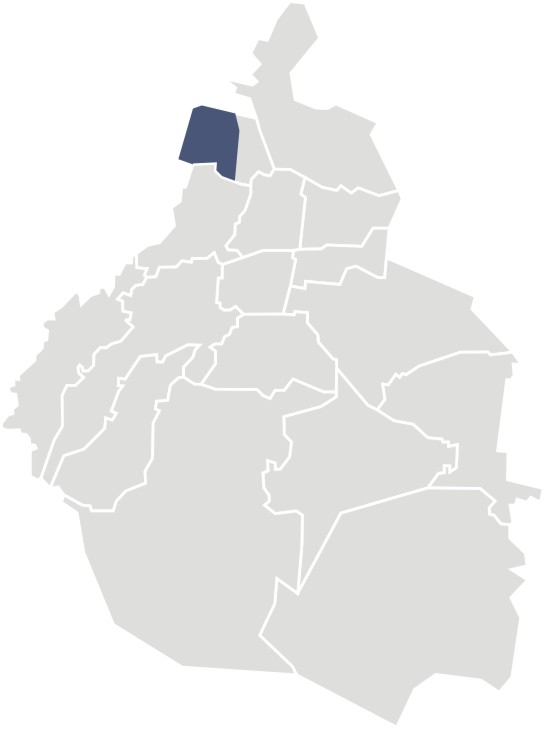
3rd district in 2005–2017

The 3rd federal electoral district of Mexico City (Spanish: Distrito electoral federal 03 de la Ciudad de México; previously "of the Federal District") is one of the 300 electoral districts into which Mexico is divided for elections to the federal Chamber of Deputies and one of 22 such districts in Mexico City.

It elects one deputy to the lower house of Congress for each three-year legislative session by means of the first-past-the-post system. Votes cast in the district also count towards the calculation of proportional representation ("plurinominal") deputies elected from the fourth region.

The current member for the district, elected in the 2024 general election, is Gabriela Jiménez Godoy of the National Regeneration Movement (Morena).

== District territory ==
Under the 2023 districting plan adopted by the National Electoral Institute (INE), which is to be used for the 2024, 2027 and 2030 federal elections, the 3rd district covers the 187 electoral precincts (secciones electorales) that make up the borough (alcaldía) of Azcapotzalco.

The district reported a population of 432,205 in the 2020 census.

== Previous districting schemes ==
Evolution of electoral district numbers
	1974	1978	1996	2005	2017	2023
Mexico City (Federal District)	27	40	30	27	24	22
Chamber of Deputies	196	300				

2017–2022

From 2017 to 2022, as in the later plan, the district covered the whole of Azcapotzalco.

2005–2017

Under the 2005 districting scheme, the district covered the western portion of Azcapotzalco.

1996–2005

Between 1996 and 2005, the district covered the central portion of Azcapotzalco only.

1978–1996

The districting scheme in force from 1978 to 1996 was the result of the 1977 electoral reforms, which increased the number of single-member seats in the Chamber of Deputies from 196 to 300. Under that plan, the Federal District's seat allocation rose from 27 to 40. The 3rd district covered a portion of the borough of Cuauhtémoc.

== Deputies returned to Congress ==
(Mexico) National parties
- Current
- PAN
- PRI
- PT
- PVEM
- MC
- Morena
- PAZ
- Somos
- Defunct or local only
- PLM
- PNR
- PRM
- PNM
- PP
- PPS
- PARM
- PFCRN
- CON
- PANAL
- PSD
- PES
- PES
- PRD

Mexico City's 3rd district
Election	Deputy	Party	Term	Legislature
1916	Gerzayn Ugarte		1916–1917	Constituent Congress of Querétaro
1917	Filomeno Mata		1917–1918	27th Congress
1918	Rafael L. de los Ríos	PLN	1918–1920	28th Congress
1920	José Inés Novelo	PLC	1920–1922	29th Congress
1922	Carlos Argüelles		1922–1924	30th Congress
1924	Luis L. León		1924–1926	31st Congress
1926	Manuel Balderas		1926–1928	32nd Congress
1928	Manuel Balderas	PO	1928–1930	33rd Congress
1930	Ismael M. Lozano	Institutional Revolutionary Party	1930–1932	34th Congress
1932	Ismael M. Lozano	Institutional Revolutionary Party	1932–1934	35th Congress
1934	Donaciano Carreón	Institutional Revolutionary Party	1934–1937	36th Congress
1937	Maximino Molina	Institutional Revolutionary Party	1937–1940	37th Congress
1940	Rafael Cárdenas R.	Institutional Revolutionary Party	1940–1943	38th Congress
1943	Filemón Manrique	Institutional Revolutionary Party	1943-1946	39th Congress
1946	Antonio Vega García	Institutional Revolutionary Party	1946-1949	40th Congress
1949	Adolfo Omaña Avelar	Institutional Revolutionary Party	1949–1952	41st Congress
1952	Felipe Gómez Mont	National Action Party (Mexico)	1952–1955	42nd Congress
1955	Patricio Aguirre Andrade	National Action Party (Mexico)	1955–1958	43rd Congress
1958	Vacant (Note: Felipe Gómez Mont won the district election but declined to attend his swearing-in. The National Action Party decided not to accept Gómez Mont's victory in the district, in protest at what it perceived as irregularities in the election.)		1958–1961	44th Congress
1961	Javier Blanco Sánchez	National Action Party (Mexico)	1961–1964	45th Congress
1964	Enrique Ramírez y Ramírez	Institutional Revolutionary Party	1964–1967	46th Congress
1967	Ernesto Quiñones López	Institutional Revolutionary Party	1967–1970	47th Congress
1970	José Luis Alonzo Sandoval	Institutional Revolutionary Party	1970–1973	48th Congress
1973	Ofelia Casillas Ontiveros	Institutional Revolutionary Party	1973–1976	49th Congress
1976	Carlos Riva Palacio Velazco	Institutional Revolutionary Party	1976–1979	50th Congress
1979	Hugo Domenzáin Guzmán	Institutional Revolutionary Party	1979–1982	51st Congress
1982	Carlos Jiménez Macías	Institutional Revolutionary Party	1982–1985	52nd Congress
1985	Rodolfo Mario Campos Bravo	Institutional Revolutionary Party	1985–1988	53rd Congress
1988	Juan Francisco Díaz Aguirre	Institutional Revolutionary Party	1988–1991	54th Congress
1991	Gloria Brasdefer Hernández	Institutional Revolutionary Party	1991–1994	55th Congress
1994	Rogelio Zamora Barradas	Institutional Revolutionary Party	1994–1997	56th Congress
1997	Antonio Palomino Rivera	Party of the Democratic Revolution	1997–2000	57th Congress
2000	José Antonio Arévalo González	Ecologist Green Party of Mexico	2000–2003	58th Congress
2003	Pablo Franco Hernández	Party of the Democratic Revolution	2003–2006	59th Congress
2006	Ramón Pacheco Llanes	Party of the Democratic Revolution	2006–2009	60th Congress
2009	Balfre Vargas Cortez	Party of the Democratic Revolution	2009–2012	61st Congress
2012	Fernando Cuéllar Reyes	Party of the Democratic Revolution	2012–2015	62nd Congress
2015	Virgilio Caballero Pedraza	National Regeneration Movement	2015–2018	63rd Congress
2018	Miguel Ángel Jáuregui	National Regeneration Movement	2018–2021	64th Congress
2021	Wendy González Urrutia	National Action Party (Mexico)	2021–2024	65th Congress
2024	Gabriela Jiménez Godoy	National Regeneration Movement	2024–2027	66th Congress

== Presidential elections ==
Mexico City's 3rd district
Election	District won by	Party or coalition	%
2018	Andrés Manuel López Obrador	Juntos Haremos Historia	57.6550
2024	Claudia Sheinbaum Pardo	Sigamos Haciendo Historia	54.6876
