= XHQT-FM (Veracruz) =

Radio station in Veracruz, Veracruz, Mexico

- Veracruz, Veracruz; Mexico
- Frequency: 106.9 FM
- Branding: La Poderosa

Programming
- Format: Regional Mexican

Ownership
- Owner: Grupo Avanradio Radiorama; (XEQT, S.A. de C.V.)
- Sister stations: XHFM-FM

History
- First air date: August 2, 1969 (AM); November 1994 (FM)
- Former call signs: XEQT-AM
- Former frequencies: 1600 kHz, 800 kHz (to 2022)

Technical information
- Licensing authority: CRT
- Class: B1
- ERP: 10 kW
- HAAT: 38.60 m

Links
- Website: avaradioveracruz.com

XHQT-FM is a radio station in Veracruz, Veracruz. It broadcasts on 106.9 FM and carries a Regional Mexican format known as La Poderosa. The station is jointly owned by Grupo Radiorama (the Pérez family) and the Ferráez family of Avanradio.

== History ==
Carlos Ferráez Matos received the concession for XEQT-AM, then on 1600 kHz, on July 30, 1969. The station was originally known as La Pantera when it signed on two days later. In November 1994, the FM combo station was authorized, and in the 2000s, the station was moved to 800 kHz on AM.

The AM frequency was turned off on May 12, 2022.
