= XHSOM-FM =

Community radio station in Tlacolula de Matamoros, Oaxaca, Mexico

Tlacolula de Matamoros, Oaxaca; Mexico
- Frequency: 106.9 FM
- Branding: Somos Uno Radio, La Voz de la Comunidad

Programming
- Format: Community radio

Ownership
- Owner: Somos Uno Radio, La Voz de la Comunidad, A.C.

History
- First air date: June 9, 2019
- Former frequencies: 88.7 FM (as a pirate)
- Call sign meaning: SOMos Uno Radio

Technical information
- Class: A
- ERP: 255 watts
- HAAT: −226.1 m (−742 ft)
- Transmitter coordinates: 16°57′10″N 96°28′38.86″W

Links
- Website: somosunoradiotlacolula.com

XHSOM-FM is a community radio station on 106.9 FM in Tlacolula de Matamoros, Oaxaca. The station is owned by the civil association Somos Uno Radio, La Voz de la Comunidad, A.C.

== History ==
The station was awarded on August 8, 2018. Somos Uno Radio had been operating as a pirate station since 2015; it relocated to its assigned 106.9 frequency on June 9, 2019.
