= Ramón Pacheco Llanes =

Mexican politician

- Born: 31 August 1954 (age 71); Mexico City, Mexico
- Occupation: Politician
- Political party: PRD

Ramón Félix Pacheco Llanes (born 31 August 1954) is a Mexican politician affiliated with the Party of the Democratic Revolution. In 2006–2009 he served as a deputy in the LX Legislature of the Mexican Congress representing the Federal District's third district.
