= Canadian Press Cable Service =

Canadian text-only headline news service

The Canadian Press Cable Service (formerly CableStream) is a text-only headline news service provided by the Canadian Press (CP) and distributed by Canadian cable television companies. The service is also commonly known as "Broadcast News", after the former CP division originally responsible for CableStream. The CP Cable Service usually appears as a dedicated cable channel, either as scrolling text or a series of text panels. However, the service does not have a uniform appearance, as its presentation varies from one cable company to the next, and it may appear with or without advertising. Typically it is accompanied with Muzak-type background music. As alphanumeric data, the CP Cable Service has never been subject to Canadian Radio-television and Telecommunications Commission (CRTC) licensing.

In the early days of cable TV, many Canadian cable companies would carry the service on a "restricted" channel, i.e. a frequency on which a local TV station was broadcasting over-the-air. Since the broadcast station might interfere with whatever channel was placed at that position by the cable company, CableStream provided an easy, low-risk means of filling that position. However, with increased pressures on analog cable capacity since the late 1990s, many systems have dropped the channel or moved it to digital cable. In St. John's, Newfoundland and Labrador, Cable Atlantic (and later Rogers Cable) used CableStream until 2006 in place of blacked-out commercial breaks on the regional cable channel ASN, due to a since-removed CRTC condition of licence intended to protect local station NTV.
