= José Antonio Arévalo González =

Mexican politician

- Born: 5 October 1971 (age 54); Mexico City
- Occupation: Politician
- Political party: PVEM

José Antonio Arévalo González (born 5 October 1971) is a Mexican politician from the Ecologist Green Party of Mexico (PVEM). He currently represents San Luis Potosí and the second electoral region in the LXIII Legislature of the Mexican Congress.

== Life ==
Arévalo joined the PVEM in 1992, while he pursued his degree in business administration from the Universidad Anáhuac and served as the commercial director of Argo Artes Gráficas, S.A., a company where he would later work as finance director. After a three-year stint as an advisor to PVEM deputies in the LVII Legislature, Arévalo became a deputy himself, winning the seat from the third district of Mexico City in the LVIII Legislature. He sat on the commissions for the Federal District and Oversight for the Superior Auditor of the Federation. When his term ended, he became a deputy in the Legislative Assembly of the Federal District, where he was the president of the Commission for Attention to Vulnerable Groups and served on commissions for Health and Social Security, Accounting Oversight, Finance, Housing, Special on Land Subsidence, and Special for Support of Firefighters.

The PVEM returned Arévalo to San Lázaro in 2006 for the LX Legislature, this time representing the state of Durango as a proportional representation deputy; he presided over the Radio, Television and Film Commission and sat on those related to Energy, Labor and Social Welfare, and Special on the Defense of Water Rights and Protection of Aquatic Environments. Fresh off his second term, he became a town councilor in Huixquilucan, State of Mexico, from 2009 to 2012.

In order to send Arévalo back to the Chamber of Deputies in 2015, the PVEM placed him on its list from the second electoral region in representation of San Luis Potosí — his third federative entity represented in three tours of duty in the Chamber of Deputies; he presides over the Hydraulic Resources Commission and also serves on the Administration Committee and the Energy and Finances and Public Credit Commissions. His selection as a deputy from San Luis Potosí, which is not his home state, prompted the head of the PVEM in the state to declare that he had no hand in the matter; since Arévalo resides in Zacatecas, also in the second electoral region he could run for a seat representing any state in the region. Additionally, his participation in the legislature has been so minimal that not even other deputies from the state recognized Arévalo's face.

== Personal ==
Arévalo González is the cousin of Jorge Emilio González Martínez, one-time president of the PVEM.
