= XHCVC-FM =

Radio station in Cuernavaca, Morelos

Cuernavaca, Morelos; Mexico
- Frequency: 106.9 FM
- Branding: Radio Fórmula

Programming
- Format: News/talk

Ownership
- Owner: Grupo Fórmula; (Transmisora Regional Radio Fórmula, S.A. de C.V.)

History
- First air date: March 26, 1993 (concession)
- Call sign meaning: CuernaVaCa

Technical information
- Class: B
- ERP: 46.94 kW

Links
- Website: radioformulamorelos.com

XHCVC-FM is a radio station on 106.9 FM in Cuernavaca, Morelos. It is owned by Grupo Fórmula and carries its news and talk programming.

== History ==
XHCVC received its concession on March 26, 1993. It was owned by Irene Abigail Moreno Cobar. Radio Fórmula acquired the station in 2006.
