= KMOK =

- Lewiston, Idaho; United States
- Broadcast area: Lewiston area
- Frequency: 106.9 MHz
- Branding: Canyon Country 106.9

Programming
- Format: Country

Ownership
- Owner: Lee and Angela McVey; (McVey Entertainment Group, LLC)

History
- First air date: March 5, 1983

Technical information
- Licensing authority: FCC
- Facility ID: 28214
- Class: C
- ERP: 99,000 watts
- HAAT: 375 meters (1,230 ft)
- Transmitter coordinates: 46°27′33″N 117°2′18″W

Links
- Public license information: Public file; LMS
- Website: canyoncountry1069.com

KMOK (106.9 FM) is a radio station in the western United States, broadcasting a country music format. Licensed to Lewiston, Idaho, the station serves north central Idaho and southeastern Washington, and is currently owned by Lee and Angela McVey, through licensee McVey Entertainment Group, LLC. KMOK once was CHR known as K107 with on-air personalities such as Keith Havens (now a meteorologist with KLEW-TV), Aaron Taylor, Johnny Mann, Sean Rivers, Bobby Knight, Kevin Chase before making the change to Country in the mid-1990s.

KMOK was launched in 1983 as an adult rock station for the Quad Cities (Lewiston-Clarkston and Moscow-Pullman), and debuted on March 5.

On June 7, 2021, KMOK rebranded as "Canyon Country 106.9".
