= KQLB =

- Los Banos, California; United States
- Broadcast area: San Joaquin Valley
- Frequency: 106.9 MHz
- Branding: La Favorita

Programming
- Format: Regional Mexican

Ownership
- Owner: Nelson Gomez; (Golden Pegasus LLC)

Technical information
- Licensing authority: FCC
- Facility ID: 70431
- Class: A
- ERP: 6,000 watts
- HAAT: 100 meters (330 ft)
- Transmitter coordinates: 36°55′35″N 120°50′42″W

Links
- Public license information: Public file; LMS
- Webcast: Listen live
- Website: kqlb.com

KQLB 106.9 FM is a radio station licensed to Los Banos in the San Joaquin Valley and Merced County, California.

The station broadcasts a Regional Mexican format and is owned by Nelson Gomez, through licensee Golden Pegasus LLC.
