= CKLT-DT =

Television station in Saint John, New Brunswick

Satellite of CKCW-DT, Moncton, New Brunswick
- Saint John, New Brunswick; Canada
- Channels: Digital: 9 (VHF); Virtual: 9
- Branding: CTV Atlantic (general); CTV News Atlantic (newscasts)

Programming
- Network: CTV Atlantic
- Affiliations: 9.1: CTV

Ownership
- Owner: Bell Media Inc.

History
- First air date: September 21, 1969
- Former call signs: CKLT-TV (1969–2011)
- Former channel numbers: Analogue: 9 (VHF, 1969–2011)
- Call sign meaning: Lionel Television

Technical information
- Licensing authority: CRTC
- ERP: 7.6 kW
- HAAT: 445.9 m (1,463 ft)
- Transmitter coordinates: 45°28′39″N 66°13′59″W
- Translator(s): see § Transmitters

Links
- Website: CTV Atlantic

CKLT-DT (channel 9) is a television station in Saint John, New Brunswick, Canada, owned and operated by the CTV Television Network, a division of Bell Media. The station has studios on Brunswick Square in Saint John, and its transmitter is located near Whitaker Lake in Petersville. It also operates analogue rebroadcast transmitters in Woodstock and Boiestown.

CKLT-DT is part of the CTV Atlantic regional system in The Maritimes. Although separately licensed, the station (along with its two rebroadcasters) is considered a full-time satellite of CKCW-DT in Moncton. Master control and most internal operations are based at CKCW's studios on Halifax and George Streets in Moncton.

Its programming is the same as that of CTV Atlantic flagship CJCH-DT in Halifax, Nova Scotia, with commercials provided from Moncton.

== History ==
CKLT signed on for the first time on September 21, 1969, owned by Moncton Broadcasting along with CKCW-TV. As part of a complex realignment of television affiliations in the Maritimes, Saint John's original station, CHSJ-TV (now CBAT-DT) set up a translator in Moncton, enabling CKCW-TV to switch to CTV. CHUM Limited bought CKCW-TV and CKLT-TV in 1972 and merged them into the Atlantic Television System (ATV) later that year. Along with the rest of the ATV stations, it was sold to Baton Broadcasting on February 26, 1997 (with CRTC approval given on August 28, 1997), enabling Baton to take control of CTV.

== Technical information ==
=== Subchannel ===
Subchannel of CKLT-DT
Channel	Res.	Short name	Programming
9.1	1080i	CKLT	CTV

=== Transmitters ===
Station	City of licence	Channel	ERP	HAAT	Transmitter coordinates
CKLT-TV-1	Florenceville	3 (VHF)	35 kW	194.8 m	46°25′12″N 67°33′32″W
CKLT-TV-2	Boiestown	7 (VHF)	0.009 kW	NA	46°27′12″N 66°27′33″W

On July 30, 2019, Bell Media was granted permission to close down CKLT-TV-2 as part of Broadcasting Decision CRTC 2019–268. This transmitter was shut down by December 3, 2021.
