= KZZG-LP =

Radio station at Goodland Academy in Hugo, Oklahoma

- Hugo, Oklahoma; United States
- Broadcast area: Hugo, Oklahoma
- Frequency: 106.9 MHz

Programming
- Format: Variety

Ownership
- Owner: Goodland Academy

History
- First air date: 2016

Technical information
- Licensing authority: FCC
- Facility ID: 192947
- Class: LP1
- ERP: 49 watts
- HAAT: 43 meters (141 ft)
- Transmitter coordinates: 33°58′49.30″N 95°33′30.80″W

Links
- Public license information: LMS

KZZG-LP (106.9 FM) is a low-power FM radio station licensed to Hugo, Oklahoma, United States. The station is currently owned by Goodland Academy

== History ==
The callsign was KZZG-LP on December 8, 2016.
