= Fernando Cuéllar Reyes =

Mexican politician

- Born: 22 September 1963 (age 62); Coyoacán, Federal District, Mexico
- Education: UNAM (Lic.); Universidad CUGS (Lic.)
- Occupation: Deputy
- Political party: PRD

Fernando Cuéllar Reyes (born 22 September 1963) is a Mexican politician affiliated with the Party of the Democratic Revolution (PRD). In 2012–2015 he served as a deputy in the 62nd Congress representing the Federal District's third district.
