= WUBN-LP =

WUBN-FM
- Wilson, North Carolina; United States
- Frequency: 106.9 MHz
- Branding: The Spirit 106.9

Programming
- Format: Urban Gospel

Ownership
- Owner: Miracle Christian International Life Center

Technical information
- Licensing authority: FCC
- Facility ID: 135130
- Class: L1
- ERP: 100 watts
- HAAT: 9.8 meters (32 ft)
- Transmitter coordinates: 35°45′32.90″N 77°57′11.90″W

Links
- Public license information: Public file; LMS

WUBN-LP (106.9 FM, "The Spirit") is a radio station broadcasting an Urban Gospel format. Licensed to Wilson, North Carolina, United States, the station is currently owned by Miracle Christian International Life Center.
