= 2016 conflict in Nochixtlán =

The 2016 conflict in Nochixtlán refers to the acts that occurred in the community of Asunción Nochixtlán in Oaxaca, Mexico on June 19, 2016, when federal policemen tried to move protesting professors and students' parents out of blocked highways. They were protesting against the educational reforms implemented during the government of Mexican President Enrique Peña Nieto. The protests left at least six dead and 108 people injured, according to the figures by the National Commission of Security.

== Antecedents ==
During 2012 and 2013, the government of Enrique Peña Nieto promoted a major educational reform, with the National System for the Evaluation of the Education. Ever since, the National Coordinator of Workers of the Education (CNTE) has shown its dissatisfaction and has conducted various actions of resistance.

Since May 2016, members of CNTE have made multiple public protests in diverse States of Mexico, including Chiapas, Mexico City, Guerrero, Oaxaca and Veracruz.

The arrest of Rubén Núnez and Francisco Villalobos, two leaders of the CNTE apprehended on June 13, kickstarted a series of blockades in highways in 37 zones in Oaxaca; among them, the road that connects Huajuapan de León with the city of Oaxaca, where the municipality of Nochixtlán lies.

On June 17, Petróleos Mexicanos (the Mexican state-owned petroleum company) issued an official statement warning that, if blockades continued, the plant of Salina Cruz would have to halt activities, which in turn "could lead to a low supply of fuels, diesel and turbosine in the nearby zones". On that same day, a group of federal and state policemen lifted CNTE's blockade to the main access to Salina Cruz, deploying nearly 800 elements, in a clash that lasted four hours.

== Public statements ==
According to the National Commission of Security, the governor of Oaxaca, Gabino Cué Monteagudo, issued a formal request to the federal police to lend their support to the state police to free those highways blocked by the CNTE, "with the main objective to allow free transit, particularly of units with first need products, and thus avoid a low supply of groceries."

The morning of Sunday June 19, the federal police initiated a clash with the members of the CNTE in Nochixtlán, where they used firearms, tear gas and rubber bullets.

The Federal Police declared that the group that participated in the operation did not carry either firearms nor batons, however, the photographs of agencies like Associated Press and Xinhua denied this affirmation. The National Commission of Security reacted to these images by branding them as "fake", and said that "the performance of the federal elements is always obedient to the protocols established in order to enforce the law without violating any human rights of the citizenship"

Later, the police did recognize the use of firearms, although according to their version, it occurred when "radical groups" began shooting at the population and at federal agents, which forced them to "change strategies"; and that "at the very end of the process, some armed personnel arrived; it was after it all had happened, the tactical retreat order had already been issued".

Enrique Galindo, general commissioner of the National Commission of Security, described the reaction against the police as "an ambush", whereas Oaxaca governor Cué justified the operative action in order to "reinstate order and the rule of higher law" in the entity.

== Aftermath ==
According to figures from the government of Oaxaca and the National Commission of Security, the balance of the clash rises to 108 people injured and six dead persons. Of the people injured, 53 were civil and 55 policemen. The deceased civilians have been identified as Andrés Aguilar Sanabria, Yalid Jiménez Santiago, Anselmo Cruz Aquino, Jesús Chain and Oscar Nicolás Santiago. Governor Cué Indicated that none of the civil casualties was a teacher.

The CNTE mentions that the number of casualties resulted by the clash amounts to eight people, who all were inhabitants of Nochixtlán that had gone out to defend to the teachers.
