= CJCB (AM) =

Radio station in Sydney, Nova Scotia

Coordinates: 46.1379°N 60.1949°W

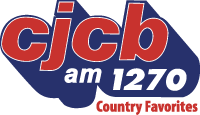
- Sydney, Nova Scotia; Canada
- Broadcast area: Cape Breton Island
- Frequency: 1270 kHz
- Branding: 1270 CJCB

Programming
- Format: Country
- Affiliations: Cape Breton Eagles

Ownership
- Owner: Maritime Broadcasting System
- Sister stations: CHER-FM, CKPE-FM

History
- First air date: February 14, 1929
- Call sign meaning: Cape Breton Island (broadcast area)

Technical information
- Class: B
- Power: 10,000 watts day; 1,350 watts night

Links
- Webcast: Listen live
- Website: cjcbradio.com

CJCB is a Canadian radio station broadcasting from Sydney, Nova Scotia at 1270 AM. The station is the third oldest radio station in Nova Scotia, hitting the airwaves on February 14, 1929. The station's current format is country. CJCB is the only commercial radio station in Canada to broadcast on 1270 AM. The station is owned and operated by the Maritime Broadcasting System, a company that owns several other radio stations in Nova Scotia, New Brunswick, and Prince Edward Island. CKPE-FM and CHER-FM are its sister stations. CJCB is the current broadcast partner of the Cape Breton Eagles hockey team of the QMJHL.

== History ==
CJCB became an affiliate of CBC Radio when it launched in 1936. It was affiliated with the Trans-Canada Network until 1948, when it transferred its affiliation to the CBC's second network, the Dominion Network. When the Dominion Network dissolved in 1962, the station became independent. On Christmas Day, 1983, CJCB began broadcasting in C-QUAM AM stereo.

CJCB played a wide variety of formats Adult Contemporary, Oldies, Top 40 etc., prior to switching formats with longtime country station CKPE-FM in June 1998 after MBS took over the stations. Over the years, CJCB used monikers such as "The Spirit of Cape Breton", "Cape Breton's Variety Station", "Cape Breton's Superstation", and "Cape Breton's Country Favorites".

On May 28, 2019, the CRTC approved an application by Maritime Broadcasting System Limited to change the authorized nighttime contours of the English-language commercial radio programming undertaking CJCB Sydney, Nova Scotia by decreasing the nighttime transmitter power from 10,000 to 1,350 watts. The daytime power would remain at 10,000 watts with all other technical parameters would remain unchanged. CJCB would also remain at 1270 kHz. Due to an antenna system failure, CJCB had been operating at 1,350 watts at night for several years. No listener complaints were received about CJCB's poor reception so it was decided to make the nighttime power reduction permanent to keep operational costs at a minimum.

=== Sister stations ===
==== CJCB-FM ====
CJCB added FM service with CJCB-FM 94.9 signing on in 1957. In 1981, CJCB-FM became CKPE-FM.

==== CJCB-TV ====
CJCB added TV service on October 9, 1954, with the debut of CJCB-TV. The station was sold in 1971.

==== CJCX ====
From 1938 to 1976, CJCB was broadcast on shortwave radio under the call sign CJCX at 6.01 MHz.

=== An earlier CJCB ===
CJCB was formerly the callsign of a radio station in Nelson, British Columbia that operated in 1923–24.
