= CJCB-DT =

Television station in Sydney, Nova Scotia

Semi-satellite of CJCH-DT, Halifax, Nova Scotia

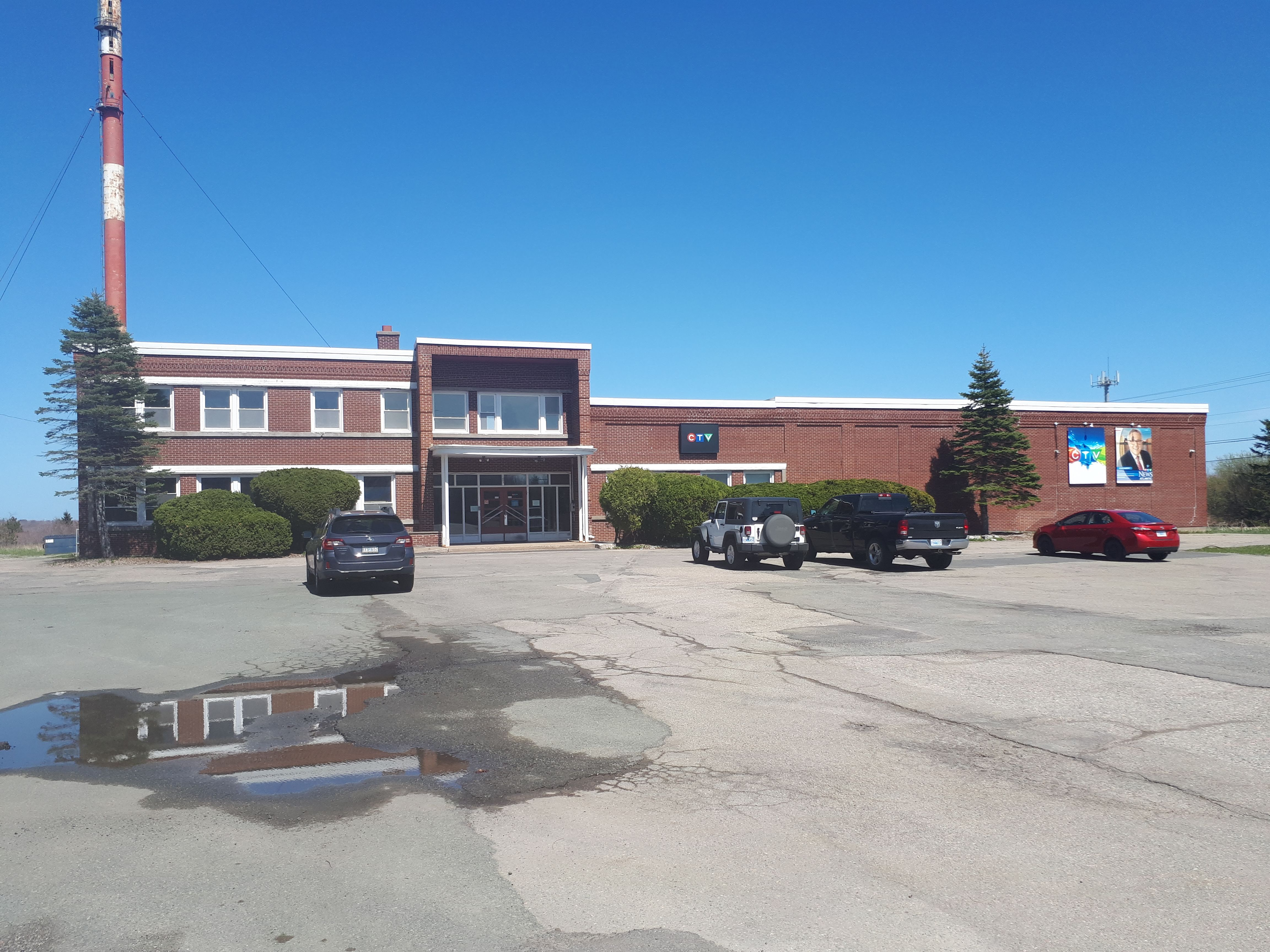
- CJCB-TV television studio and transmitter tower in 2018.
- Sydney, Nova Scotia; Canada
- Channels: Digital: 25 (UHF); Virtual: 4
- Branding: CTV Atlantic (general); CTV News Atlantic (newscasts)

Programming
- Network: CTV Atlantic
- Affiliations: 4.1: CTV

Ownership
- Owner: Bell Media Inc.

History
- First air date: October 9, 1954
- Former call signs: CJCB-TV (1954–2022)
- Former channel numbers: Analog: 4 (VHF, 1954–2022)
- Former affiliations: CBC Television (1954–1972)
- Call sign meaning: Canada Jennie Cape Breton (callsign originates with former sister station CJCB/1270)

Technical information
- Licensing authority: CRTC
- ERP: 37 kW
- HAAT: 190 m (623 ft)
- Transmitter coordinates: 46°5′53″N 60°18′43″W
- Translator(s): see § Transmitters

Links
- Website: CTV Atlantic

CJCB-DT (channel 4) is a repeater television station in Sydney, Nova Scotia, Canada, owned and operated by the CTV Television Network, a division of Bell Media. The station's transmitter is located in Blacketts Lake southwest of the city. It operated a TV studio in Sydney from 1954 until 2021, with all production and master control work now done in Halifax at CJCH-DT.

On August 1, 2012, CJCB-DT—at the time known as CJCB-TV—became the only terrestrial broadcaster in the market. CBC repeater station, CBIT-TV, was closed the previous evening. CJCB-TV became CJCB-DT in January 2022 when it switched to digital broadcasting.

CJCB-DT is part of the CTV Atlantic regional system in the Maritimes, carrying the same programming as sister station CJCH-DT at all times, except for some commercials and an annual telethon. Mass for Shut-ins is the last original program still associated with the station that is still broadcasting. Currently, it is a two-person news bureau covering Cape Breton Island for CTV News.

== History ==
=== CBC affiliate ===
CJCB-TV was the first television station to broadcast in Nova Scotia, when it signed on for the first time on October 9, 1954, beating CBHT-TV in Halifax by two months. Nate Nathanson named the station after his wife and the island he lived on. So, its call sign means "Canada Jennie Cape Breton" (CJCB) which originated at its sister radio station CJCB (AM). It was originally a CBC affiliate. It joined the Trans Canada Microwave network on July 1, 1958, linking all CBC stations between Sydney to British Columbia. Prior to the microwave connection, programming was either from live local studio productions or kinescope 16mm film copies of CBC network shows.

=== Ownership, CTV affiliation ===
CJCB was originally owned by the Nathanson family, who also owned CJCB radio at the time. CHUM Limited, owner of CJCH-TV, bought CJCB-TV in 1971 and applied to the Canadian Radio-television and Telecommunications Commission (CRTC) to switch it to the CTV network. The switch occurred on September 26, 1972, when the CBC put CBIT-TV on the air in Sydney. After the switch occurred, it immediately joined the newly formed Atlantic Television Network (ATV), CHUM's network of CTV affiliates in the Maritimes.

As part of CBIT's licence, it was not allowed to show local advertising, leaving CJCB with a monopoly in local advertising. CJCB's monopoly was reaffirmed in a CRTC decision in 1985 that denied a CBIT request to enter that part of the market. CHUM continued to own CJCB-TV until February 26, 1997, when it swapped the entire ATV group to Baton Broadcasting. The CRTC approved the deal on August 28, 1997. With the deal approved by CRTC, Baton became the majority owner of CTV.

Baton changed its name to CTV Inc. and was bought by Bell Canada Enterprises Inc. (BCE) in 2000 but BCE divested most of its shares in 2005. In October 2005, all CTV owned-and-operated stations stopped using their call sign as their brand name, meaning CJCB-TV became "CTV Sydney". BCE purchased 100 percent of CTV Inc.'s shares in a $1.3 billion CAD deal and changed the name of its division that dealt with CTV and CJCB-TV to Bell Media when the acquisition was finalized on April 1, 2011.

=== Facilities ===
CJCB-TV maintained offices, studios and the main transmitter tower at 1283 George Street in Sydney since it opened in 1954. It was the last of the three ATV stations to get colour production equipment. The station fully converted to NTSC colour production in 1975, though it was able to transmit colour programming originated through the network starting in September 1966. The offices and studio were permanently closed in February 2021, after being temporarily closed due to the COVID-19 lockdowns in 2020. After the switch to ATSC digital broadcasting, in January 2022, the old analog NTSC transmitter was turned off. Bell Media had the unmaintained 98-metre-tall (322 ft) steel tower (guyed) demolished in July 2023. A 91-metre-tall (299 ft) freestanding lattice tower used for cellular service now stands in its place. The main 190-metre-tall (623 ft) CJCB digital transmitter tower (guyed) is located at 345 McMillan Road, in Blacketts Lake, southwest of Sydney.

== Programming ==
One of Canada's longest-running TV programs, Mass for Shut-ins, originates at CJCB-TV. It premiered on March 3, 1963. Since before the closure of the TV studio, in 2021, the show is recorded at various churches in Cape Breton and on the eastern mainland. The program continues to be telecast across the CTV Atlantic system.

Shantytown was another TV program that originated at CJCB-TV; it was aimed at children and ran from 1978 to 1984. Like Mass for Shut-ins, it was also telecast to all three Maritime provinces. Characters include Sam the Sailor, Katie the Craft Lady, Marjorie the Music Lady and their puppet friends.

Local broadcaster, and occasional CBC-TV Front Page Challenge panelist, Anne Terry, worked on many programs from the station's debut, until she left broadcasting in August 1972. She was known for hosting "women's feature" and interview programs at CJCB.

CJCB had an evening weekday newscast until 1980, when all newscasts were centralized at ATV's studios in Halifax. Until the pandemic, the CJCB studio was used for filing reports from the various reporters that worked on Cape Breton stories. When Bell Media closed the Sydney studio, in 2021, it only had two reporters remaining. Bell went through many rounds of layoffs in January and February 2024, and that caused CTV Sydney to lose reporter Kyle Moore. The remaining reporter is Ryan MacDonald, and a producer.

== Technical information ==
=== Subchannel ===
Subchannel of CJCB-DT
| Subchannel | Res. | Short name | Programming |
|---|---|---|---|
| 4.1 | 1080i | CJCB | CTV |

=== Analog-to-digital conversion ===
The station ceased broadcasting in analog NTSC on January 28, 2022, and began broadcasting in digital ATSC on the same date.

=== Transmitters ===
The station has analog rebroadcast transmitters in the following communities:

Rebroadcasters of CJCB-DT (NTSC)
| Station | City of licence | Channel | ERP | HAAT | Transmitter coordinates | Notes |
|---|---|---|---|---|---|---|
| CJCB-TV-2 | Antigonish | 9 (VHF) | 260 kW | 274.9 m (902 ft) | 45°32′44″N 62°15′38″W | formerly CFXU-TV; DTV conversion pending at CRTC |
| CJCB-TV-6 | Port Hawkesbury | 3 (VHF) | 15 kW | 89.6 m (294 ft) | 45°37′44″N 61°19′34″W | |

Former rebroadcasters of CJCB-TV (NTSC)
| Station | City of licence | Channel | ERP | HAAT | Transmitter coordinates | Notes |
|---|---|---|---|---|---|---|
| CJCB-TV-1 | Inverness | 6 (VHF) | 9.4 kW | 310 m (1,017 ft) | 46°9′13″N 61°22′58″W | |
| CJCB-TV-3 | Dingwall | 9 (VHF) | 0.008 kW | NA | 46°56′58″N 60°28′2″W | Closed 2021 |
| CJCB-TV-4 | New Glasgow | 2 (VHF) | 0.005 kW | NA | - | Closed 2012 |
| CJCB-TV-5 | Bay St. Lawrence | 7 (VHF) | 0.001 kW | NA | 46°58′35″N 60°27′34″W | Closed 2017 |

The station originally operated CJCB-TV-4 (channel 2) in New Glasgow, until that transmitter closed in late 2010. The transmitter was closed down for years, as the area was also being served by the CJCB-TV-2 transmitter in nearby Antigonish.

During the CRTC's licence renewal period in 2016, Bell Media applied for its regular license renewals, which included applications to delete 40 rebroadcast transmitters, including CJCB-TV-5. Bell Media's rationale for deleting these analog repeaters was they were costly to operate and maintain; they did not generate much revenue; and viewers mostly had direct-to-home satellite subscriptions that carried these same signals.

On July 30, 2019, Bell Media was granted permission to close down an additional transmitter as part of Broadcasting Decision CRTC 2019–268. The transmitter for CJCB-TV-3 was shut down in 2021.
