= Steve Murphy (news anchor) =

Canadian journalist

Steve Murphy CM
- Murphy in 2016
- Born: Stephen Douglas Murphy; June 18, 1960 (age 66); Saint John, New Brunswick
- Occupation: News anchor
- Years active: 1977–present
- Known for: CTV News
- Spouse: Jocelyn Murphy
- Children: 2

Steve Murphy CM (born June 18, 1960) is a Canadian news anchor. He is the former anchor of weekday editions of CTV News at 6:00 p.m. on the stations of CTV Atlantic.

== Early life ==
Stephen Douglas Murphy on June 18, 1960, in Saint John, New Brunswick, to W. Douglas Murphy and Frances Lillian Theresa Murphy (née Legere) (December 8, 1927 - August 21, 2004).

== Broadcasting career ==
Murphy started his career in the spring of 1977 at CFBC Saint John. Murphy then moved to CJCH-AM Halifax in May 1980. While at CJCH-AM, Murphy moved from reporter and newsreader to being the host of The Hotline, a mid-morning call-in show.

Murphy replaced Dave Wright, who moved into television full-time at CTV Atlantic as the host of Live At 5. Murphy also started doing commentaries on Live At 5 on CTV Atlantic in 1982 and was featured on the very first episode. Murphy would eventually stop doing his commentaries on Live At 5 and become a co-host of that program in 1986, replacing Wright, who moved to Boston to anchor at WNEV-TV. He continued to host The Hotline in the morning and Live At 5 at night until 1988, when Murphy decided to focus his energies on hosting and producing Live At 5.

Murphy would continue hosting Live At 5 until 1993. Wright, then anchor of the ATV Evening News, went into retirement and Murphy was tapped as his replacement in 1993. Murphy continued to anchor CTV News at 6:00 p.m. until Nov. 30, 2021, and the newscast is the Maritimes' number one rated supper-time newscast. Murphy is also the longest serving anchor of CTV News at 6:00 p.m., having anchored the newscast for almost 30 years. Murphy is also one of the few CTV local anchors to have filled in for the anchor on CTV National News; he filled in for then-anchor Lloyd Robertson for two newscasts in 2003.

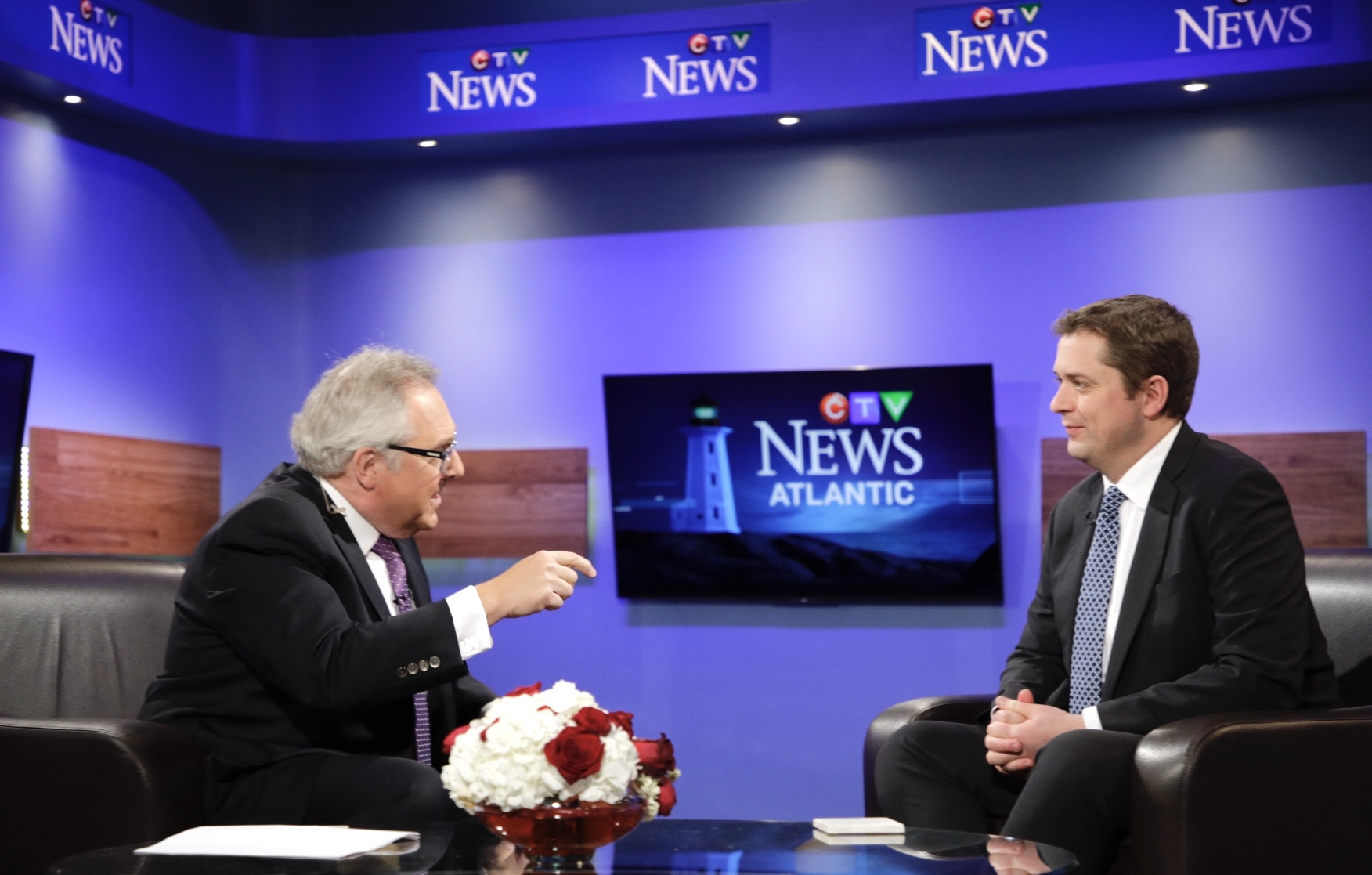
Murphy interviewing Andrew Scheer in 2019.

In September 2011, CTV Atlantic celebrated Murphy's 25 years of being an anchor and host on CTV Atlantic with a special tribute and interview on Live at 5.

On September 22, 2021, Murphy announced during the evening's broadcast of CTV News at Six his decision to step aside from his role as CTV News Atlantic's Executive News Editor and Chief Anchor for the flagship news program. After 45 years in broadcasting, Murphy's last appearance as Anchor of CTV News at Six took place on November 30.

== Stéphane Dion controversy ==
Murphy was at the centre of controversy when on October 9, 2008, during the Federal election campaign, CTV News at 6:00 p.m. chose to air an unedited version of an interview Murphy conducted with Stéphane Dion in which he had trouble understanding some of the questions Murphy was asking him in English even though Dion had an interpreter with him and they had to restart the interview several times. Many viewers thought it was Murphy himself who chose to air the interview uncut. After the interview was aired, Management at CTV Atlantic and CTV News made it clear that Murphy had no role in the decision. After an arbiter of ethics ruled that CTV violated industry code, the Canadian Broadcast Standards Council found the interview was "discourteous and inconsiderate". It also found that Murphy didn't have the authority to offer restarts, but that once it was agreed that CTV as the broadcaster should have honoured the agreement. CTV had to provide a statement saying it violated the RTNDA Code of Ethics, and air it during the supper hour broadcast.

== Personal life ==
Murphy has written three books: Live At 5: The Story Of Its Success (Nimbus, 2002) and Before The Camera: A Memoir (Nimbus, 2006). Murphy donated his profits from both books to Christmas Daddies and the IWK Health Centre. Murphy is also very involved in the community and serves as chair of Christmas Daddies, a charity that holds a telethon every year to raise money for underprivileged Maritime children. The charity is administered by The Salvation Army. Murphy also hosts the Christmas Daddies Telethon (Since 1980) and The IWK Telethon for Children (since 1996). Murphy currently lives in Halifax, Nova Scotia. Murphy also has two children. Nora, from his first marriage and Brendan from his second who excels at geography. He also wrote Murphy's Logic in 2023.

In December 2024, he was appointed a Member to the Order of Canada.
