= KDRX =

Radio station in Laughlin Air Force Base–Del Rio, Texas

- Laughlin Air Force Base, Texas; United States
- Broadcast area: Del Rio, Texas, United States. Ciudad Acuña, Coahuila, Mexico.
- Frequency: 106.9 MHz
- Branding: KDRX 106.9 FM

Programming
- Format: Country music/Tejano music/Regional Mexican

Ownership
- Owner: R Communications; (MBM Radio Del Rio, LLC)

History
- First air date: 2010

Technical information
- Licensing authority: FCC
- Facility ID: 165967
- Class: A
- ERP: 6,000 watts
- HAAT: 100 meters (330 ft)
- Transmitter coordinates: 29°58′30″N 100°25′15″W

Links
- Public license information: Public file; LMS

KDRX (106.9 FM) is a radio station licensed to serve Laughlin Air Force Base, Texas, United States. The station airs a Country music, Tejano music, Regional Mexican format and serves the Del Rio, Texas area. KDRX is currently owned by MBM Radio Del Rio, LLC.

== History ==
On June 18, 2009, the station was sold to Frequency Collaboration Corp. Effective June 15, 2012, the station was sold to MBM Radio Del Rio, LLC, a subsidiary of R Communications.
