= KXIO =

KMVM
- Clarksville, Arkansas; United States
- Broadcast area: Johnston County, Arkansas/ River Valley
- Frequency: 106.9 MHz
- Branding: 106.9 The Maverick

Programming
- Format: Country
- Affiliations: ABC News Radio

Ownership
- Owner: EAB of Clarksville, LLC

History
- First air date: 1992
- Former call signs: KXIO (1990-2024)
- Call sign meaning: "Maverick Music"

Technical information
- Licensing authority: FCC
- Facility ID: 29496
- Class: A
- ERP: 5,900 watts
- HAAT: 34 meters (112 ft)
- Transmitter coordinates: 35°33′07″N 93°24′32″W

Links
- Public license information: Public file; LMS
- Website: KMVM Online

KMVM (106.9 FM) is a radio station airing a country music format licensed to Clarksville, Arkansas. The station is owned by EAB of Clarksville, LLC.

On March 3, 2017, KXIO changed their format from classic rock to country, branded as "KIC 106.9".

On September 19, 2024, KXIO rebranded as "106.9 The Maverick". On September 25, 2024, KXIO changed its callsign to KMVM.
