= WIIS =

Coordinates: 24.555°N 81.802°W

- Key West, Florida; United States
- Broadcast area: Key West, Florida
- Frequency: 106.9 MHz
- Branding: Island 106.9

Programming
- Format: Alternative rock

Ownership
- Owner: Keyed Up Communications

History
- First air date: 1978 (at 107.1)
- Former frequencies: 107.1 MHz (1978–2016)

Technical information
- Licensing authority: FCC
- Facility ID: 72196
- Class: A
- ERP: 5,700 watts
- HAAT: 59 meters (194 ft)

Links
- Public license information: Public file; LMS
- Webcast: Listen Live
- Website: island1069.com

WIIS is a commercial radio station located in Key West, Florida, broadcasting on 106.9 FM. WIIS airs a modern rock/alternative rock music format branded as "Island 106.9".

WIIS-FM has been on the air since 1978. Island 106.9 is an alternative rock station that is known as "The Keys New Rock Alternative." It is an independent station that belongs to Keyed Up Communications in Hollywood, Florida.

== On-Air Staff ==
Island 106.9 has dedicated DJs contributing to the station's tropical vibe. Trice hosts the Friday evening's Happy Hour. Gwen Filosa hosts the mid-morning show “It's Too Early” featuring interviews, news, and weather. Shannon B. hosts the early morning training session.

== History ==
Notable former on-air staff include Dave Wurmlinger (Just Dave) who has returned to his southern California home and is doing acting work. Lou Perdomo is working as a tattoo artist in Key West. Kent Baker is missing somehow, but was popular in his morning and afternoon shifts. Former GM and morning co-host (along with Perdomo and Baker), Bryan Hollenbaugh is owner 45 North Media, which owns WMJZ-FM and WMTE-FM in Northern Michigan. "Big Giant" Chris Lepperd, who is still big and giant, is now selling classic cars in Miami, and doing some acting work. Former personality Brett Guizetti is now performing in the DC-area rock trio Hermanos Rodriquez. Rachel and "Condom Girl" were popular voices. Lazlo from KRBZ Kansas City made a stop here in his formative years. Prior to the station switching formats (Adult Alternative to Alt-Rock), in the early 90's, Deric Peace hosted a show called, "Island's Edge", which was a precursor to the station going full on alternative. Deric is currently doing weekends at WJSE 106.3 in south NJ. WIIS cannot be discussed without mentioning long time morning show host, Bill Hoebee. Bill originated popular radio segments like "Bum Chat" and airing the Crime Report from the local paper, Key West Citizen.

== Shows ==
Island 106.9 prides itself on true alternative programming. The station plays primarily alternative rock music and reggae on Sundays. The station is also the Florida Keys' only host for the live Saturday matinee from the Metropolitan Opera in New York City during the opera season, December to May.
