= CTV Atlantic =

Group of CTV-branded stations in the Maritime Provinces

- Type: Broadcast television system
- Country: Canada
- First air date: September 26, 1972; 54 years ago
- TV stations: CJCH-DT; CJCB-DT; CKCW-DT/CKLT-DT
- Broadcast area: Nova Scotia, New Brunswick, and Prince Edward Island; portions of Maine and Quebec
- Owner: BCE Inc.
- Parent: Bell Media
- Key people: Trent McGrath, general manager
- Former names: Atlantic Television System (ATV) (September 26, 1972–October 10, 2005)
- Affiliation: CTV Television Network
- Official website: CTV Atlantic

CTV Atlantic (formerly known as the Atlantic Television System, or ATV) is a system of four television stations in the Maritimes, owned and operated by the CTV Television Network, a division of Bell Media. Despite the name, it is not available over the air or on basic cable in Newfoundland and Labrador even though that province is part of Atlantic Canada.

The CTV Atlantic stations are:

- CJCH-DT – Halifax, Nova Scotia (flagship station)
- CJCB-DT – Sydney, Nova Scotia
- CKCW-DT – Moncton, New Brunswick/Charlottetown, Prince Edward Island
- CKLT-DT – Saint John, New Brunswick

All four stations refer to themselves on air as CTV, not by their call letters. CJCB and CKCW simulcast CJCH for most of the day, but air separate commercials and local telethons. CKLT is a full repeater of CKCW. However, all four stations are separately licensed by the Canadian Radio-television and Telecommunications Commission (CRTC). Station information and history is discussed in each station's own article.

== History ==
The original ATV logo, used from 1972 to 1998.

CJCH was a charter CTV affiliate when that network began on October 1, 1961. CJCB and CKCW were established as CBC Television stations in 1954. CKCW affiliated with CTV in 1969, adding sister station CKLT the same year. Between 1969 and 1976, CKCW's relay stations in Northern New Brunswick (Campbellton, Upsalquitch Lake and Newcastle [Miramichi], plus three relay stations in Quebec) carried a combined CBC/CTV schedule, becoming full relays of CKCW after CHSJ-TV in Saint John, the CBC affiliate in New Brunswick, established its own relays in the area.

CHUM Limited, a Toronto broadcaster, bought CJCH in 1970, CJCB in 1971 and CKCW and CKLT in 1972. After the CBC opened a relay in Sydney, CHUM switched CJCB's affiliation to CTV and merged its four Maritimes CTV affiliates into the ATV system. Shortly afterward, CKCW opened a rebroadcaster in Charlottetown, making Prince Edward Island the last province to get CTV. On February 26, 1997 (with CRTC approval given on August 28, 1997), as part of a group deal, the ATV stations were sold to CTV.

ATV primary logo from 1998–2005

Although each station originally produced its own news and local programming, these were progressively cut back from the 1980s onward. Today, nearly all programming originates from Halifax. However, CJCB and CKCW break off from CJCH's signal to air separate commercials and locally produced telethons.

As with many regional networks, this creates a balancing act where local stories in one community or province are of little interest in another area of CTV Atlantic's coverage area, and viewers in each province feel the news division focuses too much on either New Brunswick or Nova Scotia, along with a lesser focus on Prince Edward Island. However, CTV Atlantic has had some of the highest ratings of any local newscasts in Canada, although its presence and viewing audience is somewhat less in PEI mainly as a result of competition from CBCT in Charlottetown, which provides the province's only PEI-specific newscast.

On October 11, 2005, ATV was renamed "CTV Atlantic". Most other CTV owned-and-operated stations had been renamed the prior week. Due to it being in the Atlantic Time Zone and ahead an hour of the Eastern Time Zone, some programming on CTV Atlantic airs at different times than on the master main Eastern/Central CTV feed and for programming from the United States, is actually carried ahead of its first airing on their original American networks.

== Newscasts and regionally-produced programming ==
CTV Atlantic produces 25.5 hours of local programming each week. All news programs are produced in 16:9 high definition as of July 13, 2014 at CJCH's Robie Street studio in Halifax. CTV News also has news bureaus in Sydney, New Glasgow, Saint John, Fredericton and Moncton.

CTV Atlantic has been airing the IWK Telethon since 1996 (host by Steve Murphy).

=== Current on-air news staff ===
- Todd Battis – Current chief anchor of CTV News at 6
- Bruce Frisko – 11:30 PM Anchor, former host of CTV News at 5 (Maritimes)
- Maria Panopalis – Current Host of CTV News at 5 (Maritimes)
- Kalin Mitchell - Chief Meteorologist of CTV News at 5 (Maritimes), CTV News at Six (Weekdays) and CTV News at 11:30 (Weekdays)
- Amanda Debison - Co-host of CTV Morning Live
- Crystal Garrett - Co-host of CTV Morning Live

=== Notable former personalities ===
- Steve Murphy – Host of Christmas Daddies Telethon, Host of the IWK Telethon. Stepped down as Chief Anchor on Nov. 30, 2021.
- Nancy Regan – co-host of Live at 5 (1988-2003)
- Eric Sorensen – New Brunswick News Director/anchor; now senior national affairs correspondent for Global National
- Sharon Dunn – Cape Breton weather
- Janet Stewart – reporter/weekend and fill-in anchor; now at CBWT Winnipeg
- Allan Rowe – fill in anchor; now deceased
- Heather Hiscox — Host of Lunch Television; Now at CBC News Network
- Peter Coade – Meteorologist, ATV News and ASN News; now deceased
- Colleen Jones - Sports Anchor, ATV Sports; Later worked at CBC Television and now deceased.

== Controversy ==
On November 28, 2023, CTV Atlantic fired Palestinian-Canadian journalist Yara Jamal for her advocacy for Palestine.
