= CKCW-DT =

Television station in Moncton

- Moncton, New Brunswick; Canada
- Channels: Digital: 29 (UHF); Virtual: 2
- Branding: CTV Atlantic (general); CTV News Atlantic (newscasts)

Programming
- Network: CTV Atlantic
- Affiliations: 2.1: CTV

Ownership
- Owner: Bell Media Inc.

History
- First air date: November 30, 1954
- Former call signs: CKCW-TV (1954–2011)
- Former channel numbers: Analog: 2 (VHF, 1954–2011)
- Former affiliations: CBC (1954–1969)
- Call sign meaning: derived from its former sister radio station

Technical information
- Licensing authority: CRTC
- ERP: 390 kW
- HAAT: 304.4 m (999 ft)
- Transmitter coordinates: 45°51′6″N 64°48′44″W
- Translator(s): see § Transmitters

Links
- Website: CTV Atlantic

CKCW-DT (channel 2) is a television station in Moncton, New Brunswick, Canada, owned and operated by the CTV Television Network, a division of Bell Media. It serves as the network's outlet for both New Brunswick and Prince Edward Island (by way of a repeater in Charlottetown). CKCW-DT maintains studios at Halifax and George Streets in Moncton, with a PEI bureau on Kent Street in Charlottetown. Its transmitter is located on Wilson Road in Hillsborough.

CKCW-DT is part of the CTV Atlantic regional system in the Maritimes. It is a sister station to CKLT-DT in Saint John, which essentially operates as a CKCW rebroadcaster even though it is separately licensed.

== History ==
The station first went on the air in 1954 and was founded by Fred A. Lynds and his company, Moncton Broadcasting, along with CKCW radio (AM 1220, now 94.5 FM). It was originally the CBC Television affiliate for central and northern New Brunswick. CKCW was part of a regional network of stations called the Lionel Television System. Its mascot was called Lionel the Lobster.

On September 21, 1969, as part of a complex realignment of television affiliations in the Maritimes, Saint John's original station, CHSJ-TV (now CBAT-DT) set up a rebroadcaster in Moncton, enabling CKCW-TV to switch to CTV. CKCW then built a full-time satellite in Saint John, CKLT. However, since CHSJ-TV needed time to build rebroadcasters in the northern part of the province, CKCW's rebroadcasters in Campbellton, Upsalquitch and Newcastle aired a mixed CBC-CTV schedule until October 1976.

The two stations were bought by CHUM Limited and merged into the Atlantic Television System, forerunner of CTV Atlantic, in 1972. At the same time, CKCW signed on a repeater in Charlottetown, making PEI the last portion of eastern Canada to receive CTV.

Although for many years the station continued to air local programming, since the mid-1990s it has been a semi-satellite of CTV Atlantic flagship CJCH-DT in Halifax, Nova Scotia, except for local news inserts and some commercials.

== Technical information ==
=== Subchannel ===
Subchannel of CKCW-DT
Subchannel	Res.	Short name	Programming
2.1	1080i	CKCW	CTV

=== Transmitters ===
Station	City of licence	Channel	ERP	HAAT	Transmitter coordinates
CKCW-DT-1	Charlottetown, PEI	8 (VHF); Virtual: 8.1	9.6 kW	150.3 m	46°16′0″N 63°20′27″W
CKCW-TV-2^{*}	St. Edward, PEI	5 (VHF)	1.1 kW	103.9 m	46°53′34″N 64°8′53″W
CKAM-TV-1	Newcastle, NB	10 (VHF)	0.009 kW	NA	47°0′22″N 65°35′12″W
CKAM-TV-2	Chatham, NB	10 (VHF)	0.009 kW	NA	47°0′22″N 65°35′12″W
CKAM-TV-3	Miramichi River Valley, NB	9 (VHF)	0.009 kW	NA	46°44′52″N 65°50′31″W
CKAM-TV-4	Doaktown, NB	10 (VHF)	0.009 kW	NA	46°34′17″N 66°7′49″W
CKCD-TV^{*}	Campbellton, NB	7 (VHF) (to move to 21 (UHF))	1.8 kW	245.9 m	48°4′58″N 66°34′50″W

^{*} These and a long list of CTV rebroadcasters nationwide were to shut down on or before August 31, 2009, as part of a political dispute with Canadian authorities on paid fee-for-carriage requirements for cable television operators. A subsequent change in ownership assigned full control of CTVglobemedia to Bell Canada; as of 2011, these transmitters remain in normal licensed broadcast operation.

Additionally, CKLT (and its associated rebroadcasters) is considered a full-time satellite of CKCW.

On February 11, 2016, Bell Media applied for its regular license renewals, which included applications to delete a long list of transmitters, including CKAM-TV-1, CKAM-TV-2, CKCW-TV-2, and CKCD-TV. Bell Media's rationale for deleting these analog repeaters is below:

"We are electing to delete these analog transmitters from the main licence with which they are associated. These analog transmitters generate no incremental revenue, attract little to no viewership given the growth of BDU or DTH subscriptions and are costly to maintain, repair or replace. In addition, none of the highlighted transmitters offer any programming that differs from the main channels. The Commission has determined that broadcasters may elect to shut down transmitters but will lose certain regulatory privileges (distribution on the basic service, the ability to request simultaneous substitution) as noted in Broadcasting Regulatory Policy CRTC 2015–24, Over-the-air transmission of television signals and local programming. We are fully aware of the loss of these regulatory privileges as a result of any transmitter shutdown."

At the same time, Bell Media applied to convert the licenses of CTV2 Atlantic (formerly ASN) and CTV2 Alberta (formerly ACCESS) from satellite-to-cable undertakings into television stations without transmitters (similar to cable-only network affiliates in the United States), and to reduce the level of educational content on CTV2 Alberta.

On July 30, 2019, Bell Media was granted permission to close down two additional transmitters as part of Broadcasting Decision CRTC 2019–268. The transmitters for CKAM-TV-3 and CKAM-TV-4 will be shut down by December 3, 2021.

=== Former repeaters ===
Station	City of licence	Channel	ERP	HAAT	Transmitter coordinates
CKAM-TV^{*}	Upsalquitch	12 (VHF)	230 kW	424.9 m	47°27′19″N 66°25′4″W

On January 27, 2016, Bell Media was granted approval by the CRTC to delete their analog repeater (CKAM-TV) in Upsalquitch, New Brunswick. Bell estimated that only 200 viewers were served by this transmitter, and had received zero complaints or questions about the proposed shut-down. To further complicate matters, the high-powered VHF transmitter cost a great deal to maintain and operate, as well being expensive on electricity, and does not bring in any revenue of its own. Since CKCW-DT would remain available on local cable and satellite providers, there would be no loss of coverage or CTV programming to the area.
