= XHFM-FM =

Radio station in Veracruz, Veracruz, Mexico

- Veracruz, Veracruz; Mexico
- Frequency: 94.9 MHz
- Branding: Fiesta

Programming
- Format: Latin urban
- Affiliations: Grupo Radiorama

Ownership
- Owner: Grupo Avanradio; (XEFM, S.A.)
- Sister stations: XHQT-FM

History
- First air date: 1963
- Former call signs: XEFM-AM
- Former frequencies: 1010 kHz
- Call sign meaning: Initials of founder Carlos Ferráez Matos

Technical information
- Licensing authority: CRT
- Class: B1
- ERP: 25 kW
- HAAT: 70.5 m
- Transmitter coordinates: 19°11′29.4″N 96°7′54.2″W

Links
- Website: avanradioveracruz.com

XHFM-FM is a radio station in Veracruz, Veracruz, Mexico. It broadcasts on 94.9 FM and carries an Latin urbanmusic format known as Fiesta.

== History ==
One FM logo used until 2022

XEFM-AM 1010 received its concession in 1963 and was originally owned by José L. Bravo. Despite this, it was part of the growing broadcast empire of Carlos Ferráez Matos, which also grew to include new television station XHFM-TV channel 2, one of the first affiliates of Televisión Independiente de México, in the decade. The station migrated to FM in the late 2000s, becoming the first station with the XHFM call sign since the first FM in Mexico, XHFM 94.1 (now XEJP-FM 93.7), which operated from 1952 to 1957.

On March 31, 2022, it dropped its "One FM" format of electronic music. A new permanent format, Spanish latin urban as "Fiesta", debuted on May 1, 2022.
