= WLGE =

- Baileys Harbor, Wisconsin; United States
- Broadcast area: Central and Northern Door County, Wisconsin
- Frequency: 106.9 MHz
- Branding: FM106.9 The Lodge

Programming
- Format: Adult album alternative

Ownership
- Owner: Case Communications, LLC; (Michael J. Mesic)

History
- First air date: June 3, 2008
- Call sign meaning: Lodge

Technical information
- Licensing authority: FCC
- Facility ID: 170981
- Class: A
- ERP: 6,000 watts
- HAAT: 56 meters (184 ft)
- Transmitter coordinates: 45°3′14.0″N 87°8′37.0″W

Links
- Public license information: Public file; LMS
- Webcast: Listen live
- Website: 1069thelodge.com

WLGE is an Adult Album Alternative formatted broadcast radio station licensed to Baileys Harbor, Wisconsin, serving Central and Northern Door County, Wisconsin. WLGE is owned and operated by Case Communications, LLC.

== Translator ==
In addition to the main station, WLGE is relayed by an FM translator to widen its broadcast area.

Call sign	Frequency	City of license	FID	ERP (W)	HAAT	Class	FCC info
W227CH	93.3 FM	Sturgeon Bay, Wisconsin	150015	80	37 m (121 ft)	D	LMS
