= WWSU =

Fairborn, Ohio; United States
- Broadcast area: Ohio college
- Frequency: 106.9 MHz
- Branding: ‘’Dayton’s Wright Choice’’

Programming
- Format: College radio

Ownership
- Owner: Wright State University

History
- First air date: 1976 (at 88.5), recognized by the FCC on April 4, 1977.
- Call sign meaning: Wright State University

Technical information
- Licensing authority: FCC
- Facility ID: 73952
- Class: D
- ERP: 26 watts
- HAAT: 64.0 meters
- Transmitter coordinates: 39°46′58.00″N 84°3′43.00″W

Links
- Public license information: Public file; LMS
- Webcast: Listen live
- Website: www.wwsu1069.org

WWSU (106.9 FM) is a radio station broadcasting a Variety format. Licensed to Fairborn, Ohio, United States, the station serves the Ohio college area. The station is owned by Wright State University. Along with music, WWSU broadcasts select Wright State Raiders sporting events.

WWSU broadcasts in an open format. This means that the DJ has nearly complete control over what gets played on the air. Shows typically average two hours, with an automation system playing when no DJs are on the air.

== Operations ==
The station staff is made up of Wright State students. Members of the faculty also assist with the station, but mostly in a hands-off fashion, as the radio station is intended to be a student-run environment. DJs consist of current Wright State students.

== Awards ==
In 2010 and 2011, WWSU was rated “Best Radio Station in Dayton” by Active Dayton. WWSU had a programming schedule that spanned from about 7am-2am with back to back live DJ shows and an average show length of 2 hours. In 2021, WWSU was awarded one of the top ten student ran radio stations in the world.

== Programming ==
While WWSU broadcasts in an open format, the current main genre on the station shifts between Hip-Hop and Rock. The station also puts a spotlight on Dayton music, broadcasting both larger and smaller acts from the area. Local artists occasionally perform live on various shows on the station.

WWSU carries all home Wright State men’s and women’s basketball games. Along with game coverage, WWSU’s sports department generates video blogs with sports highlights and commentary.
