= WAXE-LP =

- St. Albans, West Virginia; United States
- Broadcast area: St. Albans; Nitro; Scott Depot
- Frequency: 106.9 MHz
- Branding: 106.9 The Axe

Programming
- Format: Classic hits and classic rock

Ownership
- Owner: Coal Mountain Broadcasting, Inc.

History
- First air date: April 2016
- Call sign meaning: "Axe" is a slang term for an electric guitar

Technical information
- Licensing authority: FCC
- Facility ID: 194320
- Class: L1
- ERP: 5 watts
- HAAT: 137 meters (449 ft)
- Transmitter coordinates: 38°24′14.0″N 81°53′49.0″W

Links
- Public license information: LMS

WAXE-LP is a Classic Hits and Classic Rock formatted broadcast radio station licensed to St. Albans, West Virginia, serving St. Albans, Nitro, and Scott Depot in West Virginia. WAXE-LP is owned and operated by Coal Mountain Broadcasting, Inc.
