= CJCH-FM =

Radio station in Halifax, Nova Scotia

Coordinates: 44°39′33.6″N 63°35′58.8″W

- Halifax, Nova Scotia; Canada
- Broadcast area: Halifax Regional Municipality
- Frequency: 101.3 MHz (FM)
- Branding: 101.3 Virgin Radio

Programming
- Language: English
- Format: Contemporary hit radio
- Affiliations: Premiere Networks

Ownership
- Owner: Bell Media; (Bell Media Radio)
- Sister stations: CIOO-FM, CJCH-DT

History
- First air date: November 14, 1944
- Former call signs: CJCH (1944–2008)
- Former frequencies: 1320 kHz (1944–1945); 920 kHz (1945–2008)
- Call sign meaning: The Chronicle Herald newspaper, founding owner

Technical information
- Class: C1
- ERP: 43,000 watts vertical polarization: 100,000 watts horizontal polarization
- HAAT: 160.1 meters (525 ft)

Links
- Webcast: Listen Live
- Website: iheartradio.ca/virginradio/halifax

CJCH-FM (101.3 MHz) is a commercial radio station in Halifax, Nova Scotia, Canada. The station broadcasts a Contemporary hit radio format branded on-air as 101.3 Virgin Radio, and is owned by Bell Media. CJCH's studios and offices are located at the intersection of Russell and Agricola streets in Halifax (behind TV sister station CJCH-DT). The transmitter is located on Washmill Lake Drive in Clayton Park.

== History ==
=== AM early years (1944–1978) ===
The station was established on November 14, 1944, by The Halifax Chronicle at 1320 AM. It was the second radio station to sign on in Halifax, after CHNS, which was founded in 1926. In 1945, CJCH was authorized to increase output power and move to a lower frequency on the AM dial (920 kHz). By the 1960s, CJCH was broadcasting with 10,000 watts by day and 5,000 watts at night. In 1961, it put a TV station on the air, CJCH-TV, which later that year became a CTV Network affiliate.

CJCH-AM-TV were acquired in 1970 by Toronto-based CHUM Limited. In 1997, CHUM Limited sold the television station to CTV. On June 22, 2007, the approval by the Canadian Radio-television and Telecommunications Commission (CRTC) of the acquisition of CHUM Ltd. by CTVglobemedia has again brought the stations under common ownership.

In 1978, CJCH got a boost to 25,000 watts around the clock. This made the station Halifax's second highest powered AM station after CFDR, which was at 50,000 watts.

=== Top 40 and Classic rock ===
Through the 1960s and 1970s, CJCH was a popular Top 40 station, the first to play all contemporary hits in the Halifax area. In 1983, it began broadcasting in AM Stereo, the first in Atlantic Canada. In the 1970s, it had a rivalry with CHNS in the Top 40 format. However, in the 1980s, listening to contemporary music shifted to the FM dial. In 1987, CJCH flipped to an oldies-based adult contemporary format, as it focused on listeners who had grown up with the station but were now over 40. In August 1993, the station switched to a Classic rock format as Arrow 92 (with Arrow standing for All Rock and Roll Oldies). In January 1994, CJCH switched its moniker to All Rock and Roll Oldies 92/CJCH. In May 1995, it flipped to a hybrid talk/oldies format; by the end of that year, the talk programming took over the entire schedule, and was branded as News/Talk Radio 920/CJCH.

=== Sports and Oldies (2001–2007) ===
In 2001, CHUM Limited started a sports radio network known as The Team. CJCH joined this network and became The Team 920 on May 7 of that year. On August 27, 2002, The Team network was shut down and CJCH flipped to an oldies format, becoming AM 920/CJCH - Yesterday's Favourites.

In July 2006, CHNS, an oldies station since February 1992, switched to the FM band and adopted a classic rock format (now airing classic hits). As a result, CJCH became the only oldies station in Halifax. Its oldies format was unique in that it ran a mid-morning call-in program called The Hotline with host Rick Howe.

=== Moving to FM, The Bounce (2007–2016) ===
In 2007, CTVglobemedia acquired CJCH and CIOO. On August 31, 2007, CTVglobemedia applied to the CRTC to move CJCH to 101.3 FM. The CRTC approval was given on November 30, 2007. The application originally indicated that CJCH would retain its oldies format. Industry Canada required a three-week test on 101.3 FM, which began on May 8, 2008.

Former CJCH logo as a news/talk station

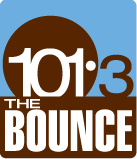
"The Bounce" logo (2008–2016)

On May 30, 2008, at 10:00 a.m., the last oldies song finished playing on 920 CJCH as the station went silent on AM. The new station launched on 101.3 FM with a Top 40/CHR format, branded as 101.3 The Bounce. The first song aired was Kanye West's "Stronger". The station did not take advantage of its right to simulcast on both frequencies for three months as is customary in such cases.

The new FM station was in direct competition with CKHZ-FM, which had a musical direction leaning to Rhythmic and Dance product, targeted towards young adults. CJCH's "Bounce" logo and fonts were patterned after CHBN in Edmonton, which, until 2010, was under the same ownership as CJCH. With CKHZ adopting an Adult Top 40 direction in March 2013 (which lasted until it flipped to country in September 2015), CJCH moved towards a Rhythmic-leaning direction, but remained within the Mainstream CHR realm. The move was also in part to avoid overlapping with co-owned CIOO, though the two stations share some titles.

On April 1, 2011, Bell Canada completed its acquisition of 100% of the shares in CTVglobemedia it did not already own and named the new division Bell Media.

=== Virgin Radio (2016–present) ===
First Virgin Radio logo (2016–2019)

On July 26, 2016, CJCH began promoting a "major change" to the station to take place on July 29 at 1:00 p.m. At that time, after playing "Sorry" by Justin Bieber, CJCH rebranded as 101.3 Virgin Radio, becoming the ninth station in Canada to use the "Virgin" branding (CFCA-FM in Kitchener rebranded as "Virgin" at the same time as CJCH). The first song on "Virgin" (as well as Kitchener's "Virgin") was "This Is What You Came For" by Calvin Harris and Rihanna.
