= KAGA-LP =

- San Angelo, Texas; United States
- Frequency: 106.9 MHz
- Branding: AGAPE Radio

Programming
- Format: Religious
- Affiliations: independent

Ownership
- Owner: Calvary Chapel San Angelo

History
- Former frequencies: 104.3 MHz (2008–2015); 98.1 MHz (2015–2022)

Technical information
- Licensing authority: FCC
- Facility ID: 135074
- Class: L1
- ERP: 100 watts
- HAAT: 0.9 meters (3.0 ft)
- Transmitter coordinates: 31°25′43″N 100°27′18″W

Links
- Public license information: LMS
- Website: kagafm.org

KAGA-LP (106.9 FM) is a low-power FM radio station licensed to San Angelo, Texas, United States. The station is currently owned by Calvary Chapel San Angelo.
