= CHRQ-FM =

Radio station in Listuguj, Quebec

Coordinates: 48°00′57″N 66°42′42″W

- Listuguj, Quebec; Canada
- Frequency: 106.9 MHz
- Branding: CHRQ 106.9

Programming
- Format: community radio

Ownership
- Owner: Gespegewag Communications Society

Technical information
- Class: LP
- ERP: 31 watts average 50 watts peak vertical polarization only
- HAAT: −7.3 metres (−24 ft)

Links
- Website: chrq1069.com

CHRQ-FM (106.9 FM) is a radio station that broadcasts a community radio format to the Listuguj, Quebec area. Licensed to Listuguj, Quebec, the station is owned by Gespegewag Communications Society.

The station was licensed in 1990 and was spearheaded by Donna Isaac.
