= WHRD =

- Freeport, Illinois; United States
- Broadcast area: Stephenson County, Illinois
- Frequency: 106.9 MHz

Programming
- Format: Christian radio
- Network: Moody Radio

Ownership
- Owner: Moody Bible Institute

History
- First air date: 2014

Technical information
- Licensing authority: FCC
- Facility ID: 184747
- Class: A
- ERP: 4,300 watts
- HAAT: 119.3 meters (391 ft)
- Transmitter coordinates: 42°19′43″N 89°46′49″W

Links
- Public license information: Public file; LMS
- Website: moodyradio.org/stations/chicago

WHRD is a Christian radio station licensed to Freeport, Illinois, broadcasting on 106.9 MHz. WHRD features both music and talk programming and is a simulcast of WMBI-FM Chicago. The station has been owned by Moody Bible Institute since March 2024. The previous owner was Northwest Illinois Radio Fellowship. WHRD has carried Moody Radio programming since in first airdate in June 2014.
