= CBAT-DT =

Television station in New Brunswick, Canada

Fredericton, New Brunswick (Note: Originally licensed to Saint John, New Brunswick; moved to Fredericton in 1994.); Canada
- Channels: Digital: 31 (UHF); Virtual: 4
- Branding: CBC New Brunswick

Programming
- Affiliations: 4.1: CBC Television

Ownership
- Owner: Canadian Broadcasting Corporation
- Sister stations: TV: CBAFT-DT; Radio: CBA-FM, CBAM-FM, CBD-FM, CBZ-FM, CBZF-FM

History
- First air date: March 22, 1954
- Former call signs: CHSJ-TV (1954–1994); CBAT-TV (1994–2011)
- Call sign meaning: CBC Atlantic Television

Technical information
- Licensing authority: CRTC
- ERP: 7.36 kW
- HAAT: 102.8 m (337 ft)
- Transmitter coordinates: 45°28′39″N 66°13′59″W

Links
- Website: CBC New Brunswick

CBAT-DT (channel 4) is a CBC Television station in Fredericton, New Brunswick, Canada. It has common ownership with Moncton-based Ici Radio-Canada Télé station CBAFT-DT (channel 11). CBAT-DT's studios are located on Regent Street and Vanier Highway in Fredericton, and its transmitter is located on Rice Hill. CBAT originally broadcast from a transmitter located on Mount Champlain near Saint John, its city of licence until 2011, and operated a network of rebroadcasters throughout the province.

== History ==
The station first went on the air on March 22, 1954, as CHSJ-TV, owned by the Irving family's New Brunswick Broadcasting Company along with CHSJ radio (AM 1150, now at 94.1 FM) and located in Saint John. The Irvings also owned Saint John's main newspaper, The Telegraph-Journal. Its network of rebroadcasters was built up between 1961 and 1978.

Originally, CHSJ was the CBC affiliate for southern New Brunswick while CKCW-TV in Moncton served the northern and eastern portion. However, in 1969, CKCW switched to CTV and signed on a full-time satellite in Saint John, CKLT-TV. Since CHSJ needed time to build rebroadcasters in the northern part of the province, three of CKCW's rebroadcasters continued to air some CBC programming until 1976.

Over the years, CHSJ had a tendency to preempt large blocks of network programming, forcing an entire province to miss several of the CBC's most well-known shows. After numerous complaints, in 1988 the Canadian Radio-television and Telecommunications Commission (CRTC) ordered CHSJ to clear the base 35-hour block of CBC programming when MITV came along that year with stations in Halifax and Saint John.

Although CBC's Fredericton and Moncton studios had produced programming for CHSJ as early as the 1970s, New Brunswick remained the final province to get a CBC owned-and-operated television station. In 1994, the CBC bought CHSJ-TV from the Irvings, recalled it as CBAT-TV, and relocated its operations to Fredericton. (CBAT's master control has since been consolidated with those of CBC's other Atlantic Time Zone O&Os into a main facility in Halifax.) Until the end of analog broadcasting in Canada, CBAT was the only CBC-owned station with a "-TV" suffix in its callsign.

== News programming ==
The station's flagship 6 p.m. newscast has been broadcast from Fredericton since the 1980s, first as the CBC News for New Brunswick, then as NB Now. This arrangement continued until 2000, when the national restructuring of CBC local news led to the creation of Canada Now, which consisted of a half-hour national and international news segment produced from Vancouver airing at 6 p.m., and a locally produced half-hour segment airing at 6:30 p.m.

Following the cancellation of Canada Now in 2007, the station's local news reverted to a full-hour format as CBC News: New Brunswick at Six. On August 31, 2009, CBC New Brunswick expanded the supper-time newscast from 60 to 90 minutes and pushed it back an hour (from 5 p.m. to 6:30 p.m.) in compliance with CBC News' mandate for more local news coverage.

The 5:30 p.m. portion was titled CBC News: Maritimes at 5:30, and was also seen on Prince Edward Island on CBCT. In January 2010, CBC News: Maritimes at 5:30 was replaced with an extra half hour of the provincial newscasts on CBAT and CBCT. As of September 2012, CBAT carries regional Maritime newscasts at 11 p.m. on Sunday – Friday and at 7 p.m. on Saturdays.

CBAT was also the only CBC owned-and-operated television station to simulcast a local CBC Radio One station's morning program until other O&Os began doing the same in 2014. CBAT's New Brunswick First is a simulcast of CBZF-FM's Information Morning, airing on weekday mornings from 6 to 8 a.m. Weather forecasts are done via satellite from CBC Halifax.

In 2003, CBAT made a controversial programming decision to preempt the CBC's broadcast of Game 7 of the Stanley Cup Finals in order to carry live returns from the provincial election.

== Coverage ==
The station is also carried on cable across the border in Maine, particularly in the cities of Presque Isle and Houlton, as well as in Washington County.

=== Transmitters ===
CBAT had seven analog television rebroadcasters throughout New Brunswick in communities such as Saint John and Moncton.

Due to federal funding reductions to the CBC, in April 2012, the CBC responded with substantial budget cuts, which included shutting down CBC's and Radio-Canada's remaining analog transmitters on July 31, 2012. None of CBC or Radio-Canada's rebroadcasters were converted to digital.

The analog transmitter had covered Fredericton and Saint John. On March 23, 2011, the CRTC denied an application by the CBC to install a digital transmitter that provided coverage to Fredericton, but not Saint John. A few months later, the CRTC approved the application in conjunction with maintaining the existing analog transmitter at a reduced power to maintain coverage in Saint John. The CBC stated that this decrease in coverage was due to financial reasons and the CBC did not commit to restoring this coverage at a future date.

=== Former transmitters ===
Call sign (post-1994)	Call sign (pre-1994)	City of licence	VHF channel
CBAT-TV	CHSJ-TV	Saint John	4
CBAT-TV-1	CHSJ-TV-1	Bon Accord	6
CBAT-TV-2	CHMT-TV	Moncton	7
CBAT-TV-3	CHCN-TV	Miramichi/Newcastle	6
CBAT-TV-4	CHCR-TV	Campbellton	4
CBAT-TV-5	CHSJ-TV-2	Doaktown	8
CBAT-TV-6	CHSJ-TV-3	Boiestown	13
