= Asunción Nochixtlán =

- Municipality and town
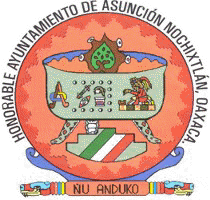
- Coat of arms

- Location in Mexico
- Coordinates: 17°27′N 97°13′W
- Country: Mexico
- State: Oaxaca

Area
  - Total: 820.35 km^{2} (316.74 sq mi)

Population (2005)
  - Total: 14,676
- Time zone: UTC-6 (Central Standard Time)

Asunción Nochixtlán (Nahuatl Nōchiztlān or Place of the Cochineal) is a town and municipality in Oaxaca in south-western Mexico. The municipality covers an area of 820.35 km^{2}. It is part of the Nochixtlán District in the southeast of the Mixteca Region. Nochixtlan’s neighboring villages are: San Andrés Nuxiño, San Andrés Sinaxtla and San Juan Sayultepec. The settlement, originally called Neochixtlán, was founded in 909 as a Mixtec military zone, by a ruler named Ndazahuidandaa. Between the years 1521-1522 the town suffered different epidemics (cholera, measles, smallpox, and plague). This caused the abandonment of the area. The new Nochixtlán was founded by Francisco Orozco in 1527. The economic activity of Nochixtlán is based on the agricultural, ranching and commerce activities. As of 2005, the municipality had a total population of 14,676. The 16th-century church, Santa María de la Asunción, is notable for a number of fine colonial-era santos (statues of the saints).

== History ==
Nochixtlán was founded in 909 as a Mixtec military zone, by its ruler Ndazahuidandaa. Between the years 1521-1522 the town suffered different epidemics (cholera, measles, smallpox, and plague). In 1526, while on an expedition with Hernán Cortés, the ruler of Tenochtitlan, Juan Velázquez Tlacotzin, died of an unknown illness. As a result of the plagues, the native inhabitants abandoned the area.

After this event, the new Nochixtlán was founded in 1527 by Francisco Orozco, who was assisted by fifty Mixtecs who survived these diseases. All of them were intellectuals, who also did commerce activity. For this reason the town became known as "the traders' town". There is a myth that in 997 Quetzalcóatl, arrived to the municipality. He was a Mixtec God who disseminates the culture, science and art in this region. In 1997 was the 1,000 anniversary of this event. That is why people expect something to happen. On the same year (1997) Mexico achieved 75 years of public education. Its promoter was Nochixtlán Abraham's son. Nochixtlán Abraham Castellanos Coronado, who was a professor, writer, and philosopher, helped to develop the cultural values of this culture.

== Economy ==
Asunción Nochixtlán has two principal economic sectors - Agriculture forms part of one of these sectors. With the corn, bean and wheat harvest, agriculture is practiced at a family level. The other principal sector is ranching. Asunción Nochixtlán is a municipality that forms part of the bovine ranching production. In terms of commerce, Asunción Nochixtlán trades crafts. It also has grocery stores, drugstores, furniture stores and hardware stores. The facilities that Asunción Nochixtlán offers are: hotel service, guest house and motels. According to INEGI in 2000, the active economic population of this municipality is 5,037 persons, but only 5,022 have a job. Of these people, the primary sector (agriculture, ranching, fishing and hunting) has 27%. The secondary sector forms part with a 25% and the third sector (commerce, tourism and services) is leading the economic activity with 48% of the active population.

== See also ==
- 2016 conflict in Nochixtlán
