= CJCH-DT =

Television station in Halifax, Nova Scotia

- Halifax, Nova Scotia; Canada
- Channels: Digital: 15 (UHF); Virtual: 5
- Branding: CTV Atlantic (general); CTV News Atlantic (newscasts)

Programming
- Network: CTV Atlantic
- Affiliations: 5.1: CTV

Ownership
- Owner: Bell Media Inc.
- Sister stations: CJCH-FM, CIOO-FM

History
- First air date: January 1, 1961
- Former call signs: CJCH-TV (1961–2011)
- Former channel numbers: Analog: 5 (VHF, 1961–2011); Digital: 48 (UHF, until 2020)
- Former affiliations: Independent (1961)
- Call sign meaning: Chronicle Herald (newspaper)

Technical information
- Licensing authority: CRTC
- ERP: 365 kW
- HAAT: 212 m (696 ft)
- Transmitter coordinates: 44°38′47″N 63°39′40″W
- Translator(s): see § Repeaters

Links
- Website: CTV Atlantic

CJCH-DT (channel 5) is a television station in Halifax, Nova Scotia, Canada, owned and operated by the CTV Television Network, a division of Bell Media. The station maintains studios on Robie and Russell streets in Halifax, and its transmitter is located on Washmill Lake Drive on the city's west side.

CJCH-DT is the flagship of the CTV Atlantic regional system, producing all of the system's programming except for some commercials and local news inserts on the other stations.

== History ==
CJCH-TV first went on the air on January 1, 1961, as an independent station, and it became one of the original CTV stations when the network began operations on October 1, 1961. CHUM Limited sold CJCH-TV along with ATV and the Atlantic Satellite Network (ASN) to Baton Broadcasting (CTV) on February 26, 1997 (with CRTC approval given on August 28, 1997), but kept CJCH radio. CTVglobemedia's acquisition of CHUM Limited on June 22, 2007, brought CJCH-TV and CJCH radio back under common ownership.

== Notable former on-air staff ==
- Gord Martineau – brief stay before heading to Citytv flagship station CITY-DT in Toronto
- Steve Murphy – weeknight anchor (retired November 30, 2021)

== Technical information ==
=== Subchannel ===
Subchannel of CJCH-DT
Channel	Res.	Short name	Programming
5.1	1080i	CJCH	CTV

=== Analog-to-digital conversion ===
The station ceased broadcasting in analog on August 31, 2011, and began broadcasting in digital on the same date.

=== Repeaters ===
Station	City of licence	Channel	ERP	HAAT	Transmitter coordinates
CJCH-TV-1	Canning	10 (VHF)	18.1 kW	270 m (886 ft)	45°12′12″N 64°24′3″W
CJCH-TV-5	Sheet Harbour	2 (VHF)	1.5 kW	70.7 m (232 ft)	44°55′29″N 62°29′52″W
CJCH-DT-7	Yarmouth	26 (UHF); 40 (VC)	1.01 kW	163 m (535 ft)	43°54′58″N 66°5′23″W

On February 11, 2016, Bell Media applied for its regular license renewals, which included applications to delete a long list of transmitters, including CJCH-TV-2 and CJCH-TV-8. Bell Media's rationale for deleting these analog repeaters is below:

"We are electing to delete these analog transmitters from the main licence with which they are associated. These analog transmitters generate no incremental revenue, attract little to no viewership given the growth of BDU or DTH subscriptions and are costly to maintain, repair or replace. In addition, none of the highlighted transmitters offer any programming that differs from the main channels. The Commission has determined that broadcasters may elect to shut down transmitters but will lose certain regulatory privileges (distribution on the basic service, the ability to request simultaneous substitution) as noted in Broadcasting Regulatory Policy CRTC 2015–24, Over-the-air transmission of television signals and local programming. We are fully aware of the loss of these regulatory privileges as a result of any transmitter shutdown."

At the same time, Bell Media applied to convert the licenses of CTV2 Atlantic (formerly ASN) and CTV2 Alberta (formerly ACCESS) from satellite-to-cable undertakings into television stations without transmitters (similar to cable-only network affiliates in the United States), and to reduce the level of educational content on CTV2 Alberta.

On July 30, 2019, Bell Media was granted permission to close down two additional transmitters as part of Broadcasting Decision CRTC 2019-268. The transmitters for CJCH-TV-3 and CJCH-TV-4 will be shut down by December 3, 2021. On January 29, 2025, Bell Media was granted permission to close down CJCH-TV-6 as part of Broadcasting Decision CRTC 2025-29.

==== Former repeaters ====
Station	City of licence	Channel	ERP	HAAT	Transmitter coordinates
CJCH-TV-2	Truro	12 (VHF)	0.008 kW	NA	45°24′37″N 63°14′58″W
CJCH-TV-3	Valley	12 (VHF)	0.008 kW	NA	45°24′37″N 63°14′58″W
CJCH-TV-4 (Note: The Bridgetown transmitter was among a long list of CTV rebroadcasters nationwide to shut down on or before August 31, 2009, as part of a political dispute with Canadian authorities on paid fee-for-carriage requirements for cable television operators. A subsequent change in ownership assigned full control of CTVglobemedia to Bell Canada.)	Bridgetown	13 (VHF)	0.008 kW	NA	44°52′35″N 65°18′23″W
CJCH-TV-6	Caledonia	6 (VHF)	100 kW	192.9 m (633 ft)	44°20′26″N 65°6′31″W
CJCH-TV-8	Marinette	23 (UHF)	0.01 kW	NA	44°58′10″N 62°39′51″W
