= Santiago Juxtlahuaca =

- Municipality and town
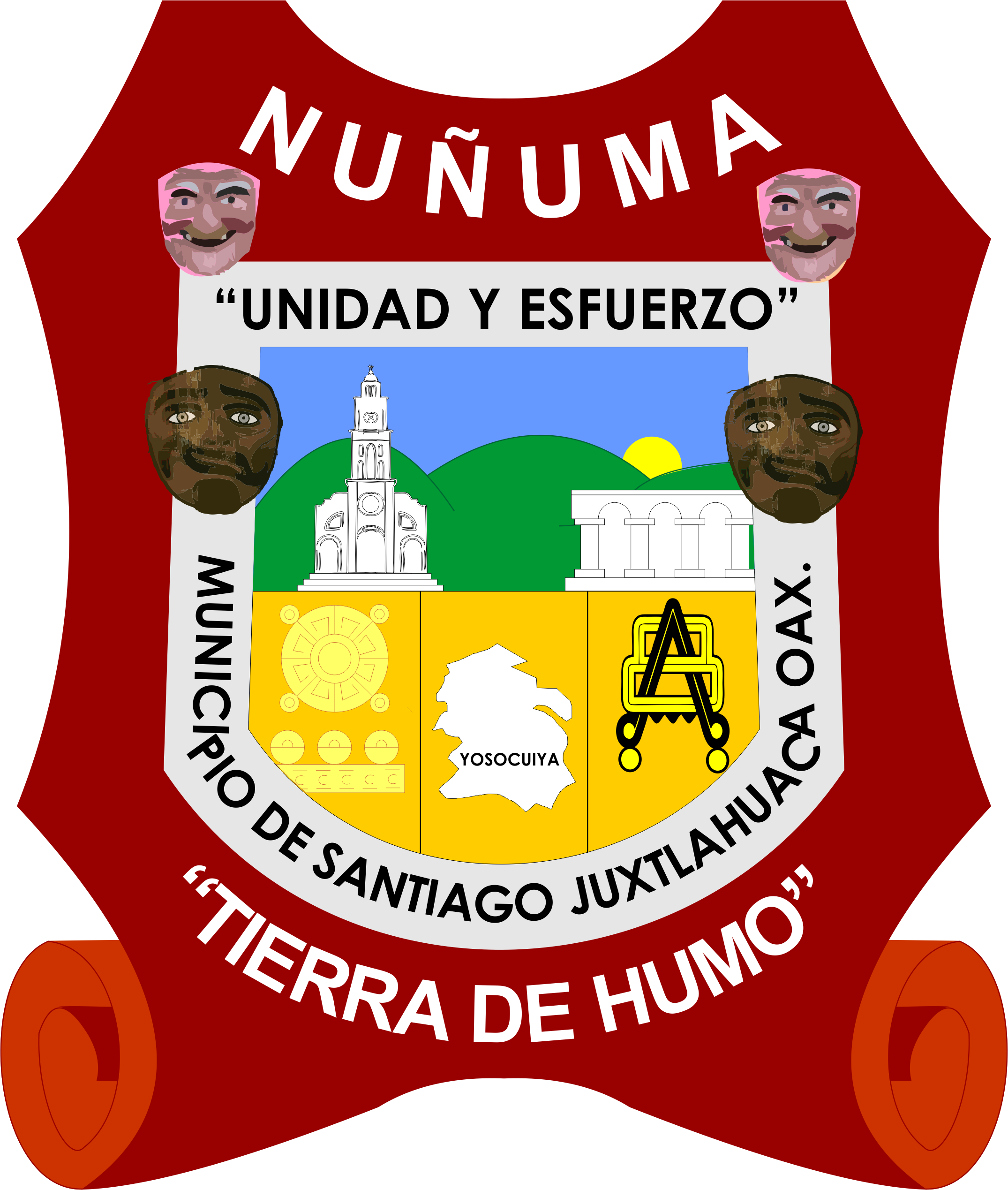
- Coat of arms

- Location of the municipality in Oaxaca

- Location in Mexico
- Coordinates: 17°20′N 98°01′W
- Country: Mexico
- State: Oaxaca

Area
  - Total: 583.05 km^{2} (225.12 sq mi)
- Elevation: 1,690 m (5,540 ft)

Population (2005)
  - Total: 33,401
- Time zone: UTC-6 (Central Standard Time)

Santiago Juxtlahuaca is a town and municipality in Oaxaca in southeastern Mexico. It is in the Juxtlahuaca District of the Mixteca Region.

== Town ==
The town is at a height of 1,690 meters above sea level. It is one of the oldest towns in the Mixteca region of Oaxaca, dating back to the 12th century AD. The name Juxtlahuaca derives from the Nahuatl Xohuixtlahuacan. The name in Mixtec was Yosocuya, or Yodzocuiya. Both the Nahuatl and Mixtec names mean "plain of the year".

In prehispanic times, when the ruler of Juxtlahuaca wished to marry, he first talked of the proposition to the girl and her parents and consulted the priests. Then a group of principales (non-ruling nobles) would give the girl gifts, and escort her to the ruler's residence, followed by a gathering of nobles and priests that night. The marriage ceremony consisted of the couple having their mantles tied together, and the groom placing a piece of tortilla and meat in the mouth of the bride, and vice versa, followed by a feast. The ruler of Juxtlahuaca was allowed to take multiple wives. The ruler could be succeeded by either his son or daughter, but they had to be the child of his first wife.

The first Spanish visitor was the Dominican friar Gonzalo Lucero, who passed through in the year 1536 on a journey of exploration. Three years later the monk Benito Hernández persuaded the natives to move to a new location, founded on 13 September 1542. Between 1600 and 1633 the town was moved to its current location in the north of the valley, with the first streets laid out in the Spanish style. The town was periodically shaken by earthquakes during the colonial period, destroying churches and other major buildings.

The town was connected to the outside world by a telegraph line in March 1883. A rural health center was established in April 1938, and in 1944 an airfield was opened.

== Municipality ==
The municipality covers an area of 583.05 square kilometres (225.12 mi^{2}). As of 2005, the municipality had a total population of 33,401 in 6,165 households. Of these, 20,648 people spoke an indigenous language.

Map of the area
