= 102.1 FM =

FM radio frequency

The following radio stations broadcast on FM frequency 102.1 MHz:

== Argentina ==
- LRI315 in Santa Fe, Santa Fe
- LRI854 Vorterix Rock in Rosario, Santa Fe
- Radio María in San Pedro, Buenos Aires
- Radio María in Paraná, Entre Ríos
- Radio María in Salta
- Radio María in Santa Fe

== Australia ==
- 4ZZZ in Brisbane, Queensland
- 8CCC in Alice Springs and Tennant Creek, Northern Territory
- ABC Classic in Longreach, Queensland
- 3MIL in Swan Hill, Victoria
- CAAMA in Yulara, Northern Territory
- 3NNN in Wangaratta, Victoria
- SBS Radio in Moree, New South Wales
- Triple J in Broken Hill, New South Wales
- Triple J in Newcastle, New South Wales

== Brazil ==
- ZYD 604 in Rio Grande, Rio Grande do Sul

== Canada (Channel 271) ==
- CBGA-FM in Matane, Quebec
- CBJ-FM-6 in La Baie, Quebec
- CBOF-FM-7 in Brockville, Ontario
- CBR-FM in Calgary, Alberta
- CBUF-FM-1 in Chilliwack, British Columbia
- CBUR-FM in Houston, British Columbia
- CFCJ-FM in Cochrane, Ontario
- CFEL-FM in Levis, Quebec
- CFNY-FM in Brampton, Ontario
- CFSI-FM-1 in Saltspring Island, British Columbia
- CFWY-FM in Whitehorse, Yukon
- CHPR-FM in Hawkesbury, Ontario
- CISW-FM in Whistler, British Columbia
- CJCY-FM in Medicine Hat, Alberta
- CJDJ-FM in Saskatoon, Saskatchewan
- CJGO-FM in La Sarre, Quebec
- CJRW-FM in Summerside, Prince Edward Island
- CJTK-FM-2 in Little Current, Ontario
- CKHL-FM in High Level, Alberta
- CKXR-FM-1 in Sorrento, British Columbia
- CKXR-FM-3 in Sicamous, British Columbia
- VF2291 in Carol Lake Mining, Newfoundland and Labrador
- VF2537 in Fruitvale, British Columbia
- VOAR-5-FM in Deer Lake, Newfoundland and Labrador

== India ==
- FM Rainbow in Trichy, Tamil Nadu
- Akashvani Hazaribagh

== Malaysia ==
- Raaga in Taiping, Padang Rengas, Kuala Kangsar, Parit, Manjung, Lumut, Pulau Pangkor, Sitiawan, Terong, Pantai Remis, Batu Hampar, Beruas, Kampung Segari, Lumut, Sungai Siput (North), Enggor, Parit Buntar, Semanggol, Alor Pongsu, Batu Kurau, Kuala Kurau, Selama, Kamunting, Changkat Jering, Matang, Simpang, Kuala Sepetang, Tanjung Piandang, Bagan Serai, Rantau Panjang Selama, Perak and Bandar Baharu, Kedah
- Sinar in Kuching, Sarawak

== Mexico ==
- XHAG-FM in Córdoba, Veracruz
- XHECPQ-FM in Felipe Carrillo Puerto, Quintana Roo
- XHEPS-FM in Guaymas, Sonora
- XHESL-FM in San Luis Potosí, San Luis Potosí
- XHJK-FM in Ciudad Delicias, Chihuahua
- XHOMA-FM in Comala, Colima
- XHPECW-FM in Actopan, Hidalgo
- XHPIC-FM in Pichucalco, Chiapas
- XHQI-FM in Monterrey, Nuevo León
- XHTOM-FM in Toluca, Estado de México
- XHURM-FM in Uruapan, Michoacán
- XHVC-FM in Puebla, Puebla
- XHVFC-FM in Otumba, Estado de México
- XHYO-FM in Huatabampo, Sonora

== United Kingdom ==
- MKFM in Bletchley
- Q Radio in Enniskillen
- Swansea Bay Radio in Swansea

== United States (Channel 271) ==
- KAHM in Prescott, Arizona
- KBDY in Hanna, Wyoming
- KBMC (FM) in Bozeman, Montana
- KBUC in Raymondville, Texas
- KCAJ in Roseau, Minnesota
- KCEZ in Los Molinos, California
- KCKC in Kansas City, Missouri
- KDGE in Fort Worth-Dallas, Texas
- KDKS in Blanchard, Louisiana
- KEEY in Saint Paul, Minnesota
- KEGB-LP in Bend, Oregon
- KEOK in Tahlequah, Oklahoma
- KFIM-LP in Carroll, Iowa
- KFMA in Oro Valley, Arizona
- KFZX in Gardendale, Texas
- KGRE-FM in Estes Park, Colorado
- KHBE in Big Wells, Texas
- KHKC-FM in Atoka, Oklahoma
- KILX in De Queen, Arkansas
- KJAS-LP in Ames, Iowa
- KJFM in Louisiana, Missouri
- KLVJ in Encinitas, California
- KMJQ in Houston, Texas
- KODC-LP in Dodge City, Kansas
- KOKY in Sherwood, Arkansas
- KPQ in Wenatchee, Washington
- KPRR in El Paso, Texas
- KQMY in Paia, Hawaii
- KQRA in Brookline, Missouri
- KQUQ-LP in Albuquerque, New Mexico
- KRAK in Anchorage, Alaska
- KRBQ in San Francisco, California
- KRKC-FM in King City, California
- KRNV in Reno, Nevada
- KSMT in Breckenridge, Colorado
- KSSI in China Lake, California
- KSTI in Port Angeles, Washington
- KSWW in Ocean Shores, Washington
- KTRA in Farmington, New Mexico
- KTUI-FM in Sullivan, Missouri
- KUDO-LP in Harrison, Arkansas
- KUQQ in Milford, Iowa
- KWFO-FM in Driggs, Idaho
- KXSU-LP in Seattle, Washington
- KXWS-LP in Watsonville, California
- KYBG in Basile, Louisiana
- KYRN in Socorro, New Mexico
- KYUN in Twin Falls, Idaho
- KZLJ-LP in La Junta, Colorado
- KZMC in McCook, Nebraska
- KZSN in Hutchinson, Kansas
- WALS in Oglesby, Illinois
- WALT-FM in Meridian, Mississippi
- WAQY in Springfield, Massachusetts
- WAVR in Waverly, New York
- WCPP-LP in Ironwood, Michigan
- WCRM-LP in Columbus, Ohio
- WDNB in Jeffersonville, New York
- WDNL in Danville, Illinois
- WDOK in Cleveland, Ohio
- WDRM in Decatur, Alabama
- WFAH-LP in Flint, Michigan
- WGAF-LP in Fayetteville, Georgia
- WGMG in Crawford, Georgia
- WHJU-LP in Conyers, Georgia
- WIBV in Mount Vernon, Illinois
- WIFT in Du Bois, Pennsylvania
- WIMT in Lima, Ohio
- WIOQ in Philadelphia, Pennsylvania
- WIQQ in Leland, Mississippi
- WIVI in Cruz Bay, Virgin Islands
- WJCA in Albion, New York
- WJMH in Reidsville, North Carolina
- WJST in Sylvester, Georgia
- WKFF in Sardis, Mississippi
- WKLG in Rock Harbor, Florida
- WKOT-LP in Wimauma, Florida
- WKYL in Lawrenceburg, Kentucky
- WKZV in Tybee Island, Georgia
- WLCT in Lafayette, Tennessee
- WLEW in Bad Axe, Michigan
- WLJC in Beattyville, Kentucky
- WLLE in Mayfield, Kentucky
- WLUM in Milwaukee, Wisconsin
- WMJS-LP in Prince Frederick, Maryland
- WMUK in Kalamazoo, Michigan
- WMXT in Pamplico, South Carolina
- WNGA-LP in Talking Rock, Georgia
- WNGK-LP in Fort Lauderdale, Florida
- WOPC-LP in Bradenton, Florida
- WPBW-LP in St. Petersburg, Florida
- WQLC in Watertown, Florida
- WQLF in Lena, Illinois
- WQUA in Citronelle, Alabama
- WRGR in Tupper Lake, New York
- WRKU in Forestville, Wisconsin
- WRQO in Monticello, Mississippi
- WRVB in Marietta, Ohio
- WRXL in Richmond, Virginia
- WSAK in Hampton, New Hampshire
- WVFC-LP in Stephenson, Michigan
- WVXR in Randolph, Vermont
- WWAV in Santa Rosa Beach, Florida
- WWFH-LP in Land O' Lakes, Florida
- WWST in Sevierville, Tennessee
- WWWD in Bolingbroke, Georgia
- WXTG in Virginia Beach, Virginia
- WZUN-FM in Phoenix, New York
- WZVV in Dexter, Maine
