= KUOL =

KUOL may refer to:

- KUOL (FM), a radio station (94.5 FM) licensed to serve Elko, Nevada, United States
- KUOL (Texas), a radio station (1470 AM) formerly licensed to serve San Macros, Texas, United States
- KPPS-LP, a radio station (97.5 FM) licensed to serve St. Louis Park, Minnesota, United States, which held the call sign KUOL-LP from 2014 to 2016
- KILX, a radio station (105.5 FM) licensed to serve Lockesburg, Arkansas, United States, which held the call sign KUOL from 1981 to 1988
