= KYPX =

KYPX may refer to:

- KYPX (FM), a radio station (106.5 FM) licensed to serve Helena Valley SE, Montana, United States
- KMYA-DT, a television station (channel 18/virtual 49) licensed to serve Camden, Arkansas, United States, which held the call sign KYPX from 2001 to 2006
- KARZ-TV, a television station (channel 14, virtual 42) licensed to serve Little Rock, Arkansas, which held the call sign KYPX from 1998 to 2001
