= XHJK =

XHJK may refer to:

- XHJK-FM, a radio station (102.1 FM) in Ciudad Delicias, Chihuahua, Mexico
- XHJK-TDT, a television station (channel 28, virtual 1) in Tijuana, Baja California, Mexico
