= KJCD =

KJCD may refer to:

- KJCD-LP, a low-power radio station (92.9 FM) licensed to serve Pine Ridge, South Dakota, United States
- KYPZ, a radio station (96.1 FM) licensed to serve Fort Benton, Montana, United States, which held the call sign KJCD from 2008 to 2013
- KKFN, a radio station (104.3 FM) licensed to serve Longmont, Colorado, United States, which held the call sign KJCD from 2000 to 2008
