= WKOT =

WKOT may refer to:

- WKOT-LP, a low-power radio station (102.1 FM) licensed to serve Wimauma, Florida, United States
- WLWF, a radio station (96.5 FM) licensed to Marseilles, Illinois, United States, which held the call sign WKOT from 1990 to 2010
- WOKT, a radio station (1080 AM) licensed to Cannonsburg, Kentucky, United States, which held the call sign WKOT from 1985 to 1986
