= Eleanor Dumont =

American gambler (c. 1829–1879)

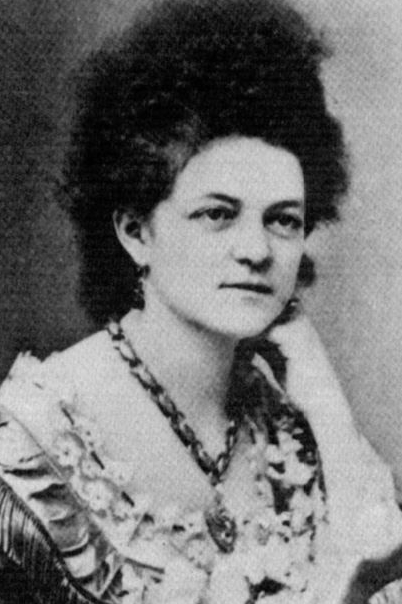
- Dumont, c. 1860
- Born: c. 1829; France or New Orleans, Louisiana, US
- Died: 1879 (aged 49-50); Bodie, California, US
- Other names: Madame Moustache, Simone Jules
- Occupation: Gambler

Eleanor Dumont (born Simone Jules; c. 1829–1879), also called Eleonore Alphonsine Dumant, was a notorious gambler on the American Western Frontier, especially during the California Gold Rush. She was also known by her nickname Madame Moustache due to the appearance of a line of dark hair on her upper lip.

== Life ==
The background of Eleanor Dumont is unconfirmed. She arrived at Nevada City, California in 1854. At this point, she appeared to be 20 years old, had taken on the name Eleanor Dumont, and capitalized on the fascination for French women prevalent in the West. In reality, however, she was likely born as Simone Jules in 1829, possibly by French Creole parents in New Orleans.

=== Gambling ===
In Nevada City, California, Dumont opened a gambling parlor named Vingt-et-un on Broad Street. She was described as an accomplished card dealer, and made a living from twenty-one and other casino games. Only well-kept men were allowed in, and no women except for herself. Reportedly, men admired her for her beauty and charm, but she kept them all at a distance. She flirted, but only to attract customers. Men came from all around to see the rarity of "the woman dealer". The parlor was successful, and Dumont went into business with Dave Tobin, an experienced gambler. They opened Dumont's Place, which was successful until gold started to dry up in Nevada City, and in 1859, she sold the Dumont Gambling Palace and left Tobin and Nevada City.

Moving from place to place, she was reported to work in Bodie, California; Deadwood, South Dakota; Fort Benton, Montana; Pioche, Nevada; Tombstone, Arizona; and San Francisco, California. She moved around from city to city, gambling and building her money again. During her time in Bannack, Montana, her famous moustache began to grow, after which she was given the nickname of "Madame Moustache". She continued to attract crowds as a gambler and had a long-standing reputation for dealing fair.

=== Brothel madam ===
Dumont added prostitution to her repertoire during the 1860s when she became the madam of a brothel. She kept brothels in many of the cities she visited as a gambler. To promote her business, she paraded her employees around town in carriages, showing off their beauty in broad daylight, much to the dislike of non-prostitute women.

In 1870, she bought a ranch and some animals in Carson City, Nevada. It was there that she fell in love with Jack McKnight, who conned her out of all of her money and left her in 1872.

=== Death ===
Dumont's last stop was Bodie, California. One night while gambling, she misjudged a play and suddenly owed a lot of money. That night, she wandered outside of town and was found dead on September 8, 1879, of an overdose of morphine, apparently a suicide.

== In popular culture ==
=== Books ===
The Betting Woman: A Novel of Madame Moustache by Jenni L. Walsh is the fictionalized account of Eleanor Dumont's life. Published in 2021 by Wyatt-Mackenzie Publishing.
