= CKCR-FM =

Radio station in Revelstoke, British Columbia

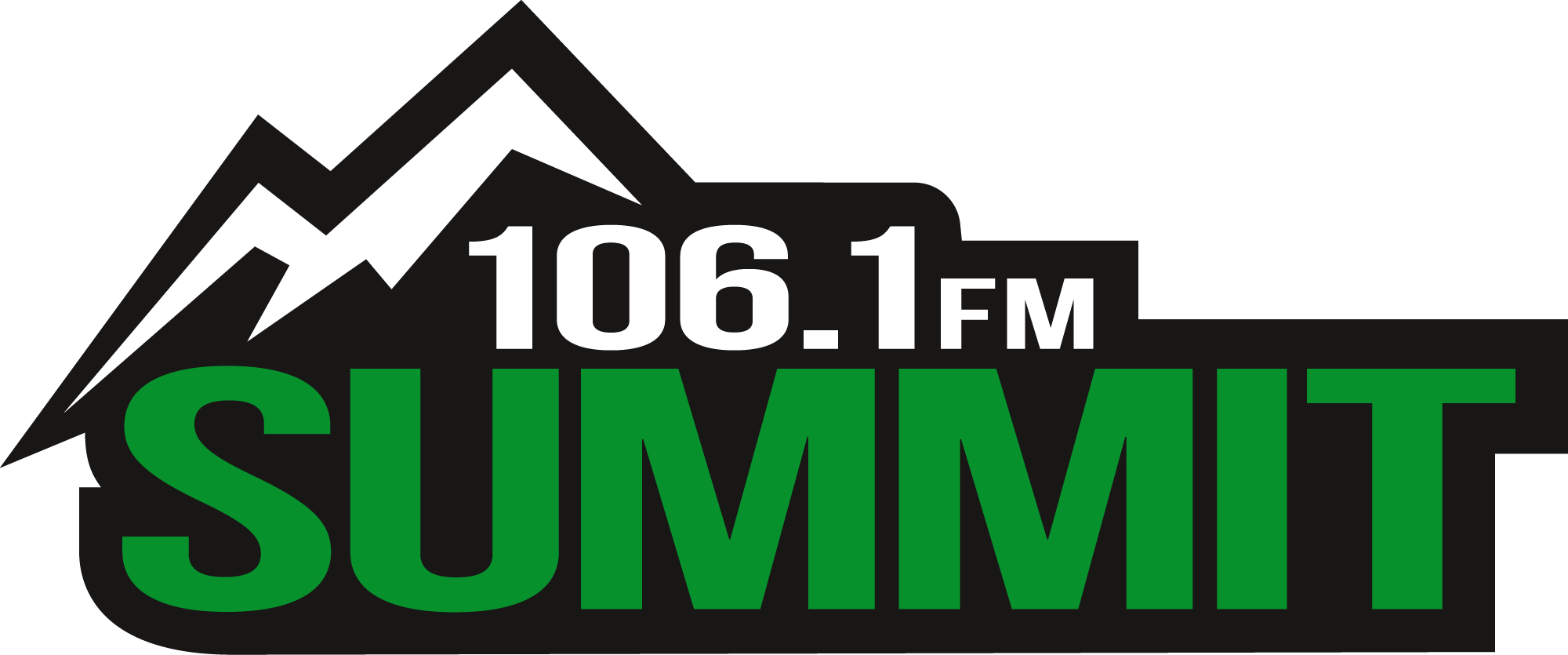
- Revelstoke, British Columbia; Canada
- Frequency: 106.1 MHz
- Branding: 106.1 Summit

Programming
- Format: Classic hits

Ownership
- Owner: Vista Radio

History
- First air date: 1965
- Former frequencies: 1340 kHz (1965–2009)

Technical information
- Class: A
- ERP: 800 watts (Horizontal only)
- HAAT: −810.8 metres (−2,660 ft)
- Transmitter coordinates: 50.99°N 118.22°W

Links
- Webcast: Listen Live

CKCR-FM is a Canadian radio station in Revelstoke, British Columbia. The station operates at 106.1 FM. CKCR is owned by Vista Radio and airs an adult hits format under the on-air brand 106.1 Summit.

== History ==
In 1965, Hall-Gray Broadcasting Co. Ltd. (Bob Hall and Walter Gray) launched CKCR Revelstoke on the AM dial at 1340 kHz. CKCR was a re-broadcaster of CKXR in Salmon Arm.

In 1974, CKCR was given approval to start broadcasting local content of its own in addition to content received from CKXR. That same year CKCR set up a re-broadcaster of its own in Golden, CKGR.

Over the years, the station went through different ownerships. In October 2007, the assets of Standard Radio (including CKCR) were purchased by Astral Media. Astral's assets were acquired by the station's current owner, Bell Media, in September 2013.

CKCR in Revelstoke applied to convert to the FM band, which received Canadian Radio-television and Telecommunications Commission (CRTC) approval on March 3, 2009. CKCR now broadcasts at 106.1 FM with 800 watts.

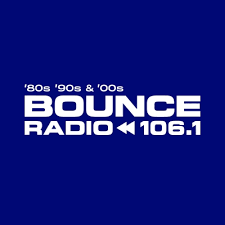
Logo as "Bounce Radio", 2021–2025

As part of a mass format reorganization by Bell Media, on May 18, 2021, CKCR flipped to adult hits, and adopted the Bounce branding.

On February 8, 2024, Bell announced a restructuring that included the sale of 45 of its 103 radio stations to seven buyers, subject to approval by the CRTC, including CKCR, which was to be sold to Vista Radio. The application was approved on February 13, 2025.

The sale took effect April 14, 2025 and Vista rebranded the station to Classic Hits as 106.1 Summit.

== See also ==
- CKXR-FM
