= Far West (steamship) =

American steamboat

Coordinates: 38.7848°N 90.4764°W

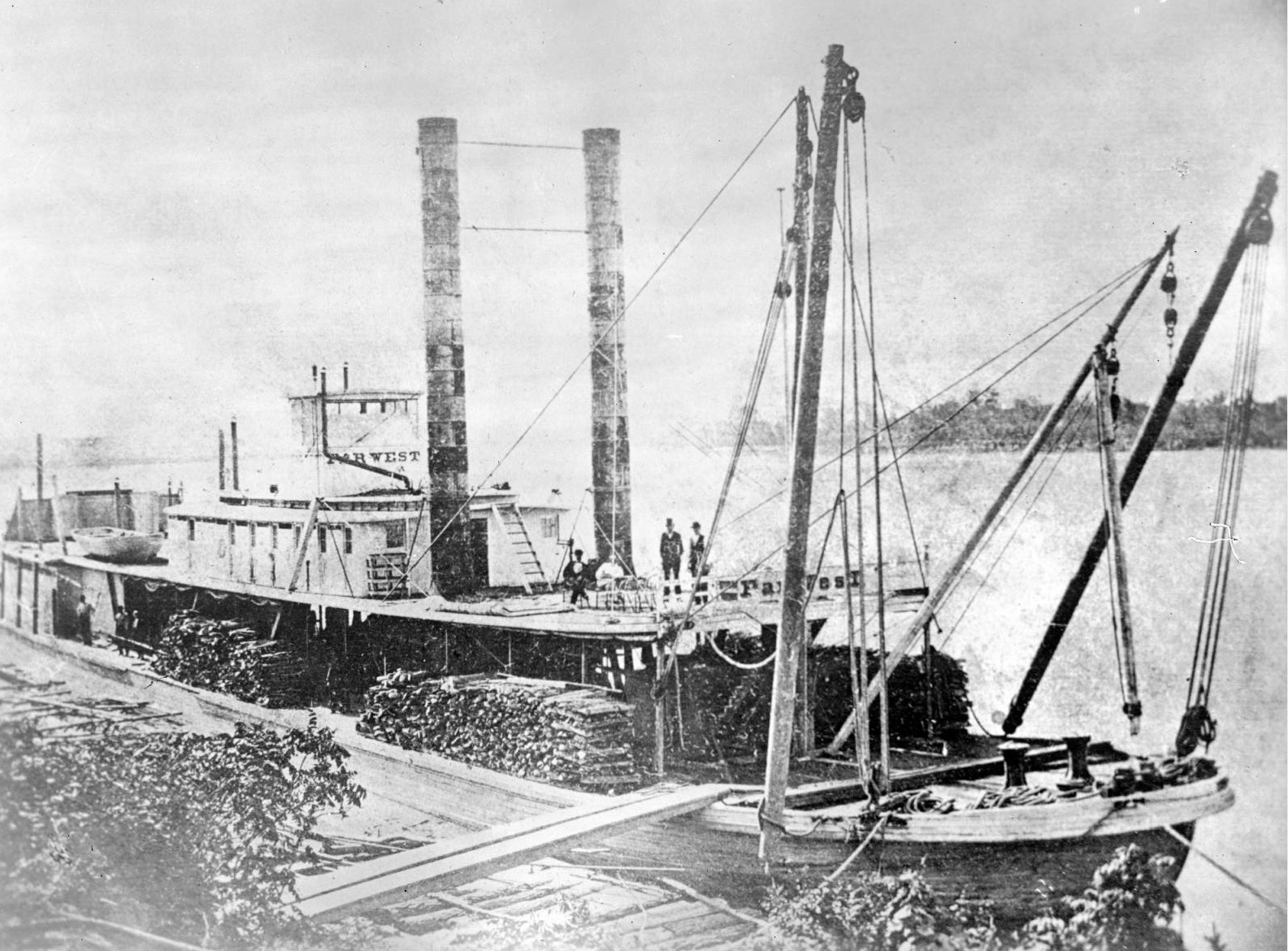

History

United States
- Name: Far West
- Launched: 1870
- Fate: Wrecked, October 1883

General characteristics
- Type: Stern-wheel paddle steamer
- Length: 190 ft (58 m)
- Beam: 33 ft (10 m)
- Draft: 30 in (760 mm) (fully laden)
- Decks: 3
- Propulsion: 2 × Herbertson Engine Works steam engines; 3 × boilers; Stern paddlewheel
- Capacity: 200 tons of freight & 30 passengers

Far West was a shallow draft sternwheel steamboat (or riverboat) plying the upper Missouri and Yellowstone Rivers in the Dakota and Montana Territories, in the years from 1870 to 1883. By being involved in historic events in the Indian Wars of the western frontier, the Far West became an iconic symbol of the shallow draft steamboat plying the upper Missouri and Yellowstone Rivers in the era before railroads dominated transport in these areas.

The Far West was light, strong and speedy. She was initially owned by the Coulson Packet Line who contracted with the Army in the 1870s to provide steamboats to support Army expeditions on the Yellowstone River in the Montana Territory. The Far West was used in this capacity, along with its sister riverboat the Josephine. The Far West was often piloted by the famous river boat captain and pilot, Grant Marsh. The Far West was known as a fast boat because she had powerful engines, a hull with limited water resistance, and a low profile that reduced wind resistance. She set a number of speed records for both upstream and downstream travel on the Missouri and the Yellowstone.

A number of authors write that by virtue of her shallow draft and her ability to "grasshopper" over sand bars (using spars and steam capstans on the front of the boat to lift the boat and swing it forward a few feet at a time) she was famous for being able to get through shallow channels and low water conditions on the Yellowstone and Missouri Rivers that turned back other steamboats.

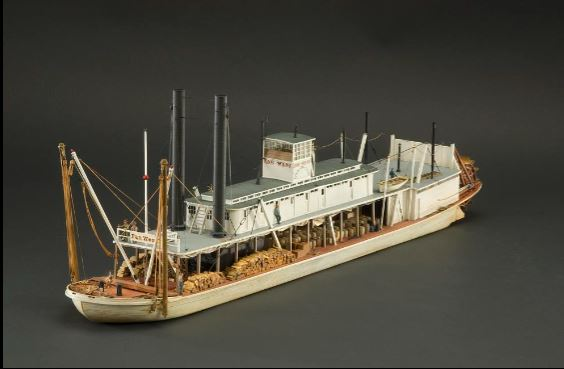
This model of the Far West in the Smithsonian Institution shows the long spars at the bow of the boat used for sparring ("grasshoppering") off a sandbar.

However, the length and position of the grasshoppering spars at the bow of the boat suggest that if the spars are to be used as a lever to lift/move the boat, it would be to back the boat off the sandbar, rather than attempt to propel it forward over the bar. If the spar were to be used to lever the boat forward, then it would have to be angled with its top toward the stern of the boat and lines attached to the top of it pulling that end of the spar forward. Since the fulcrum of the spar is at the bow of the boat, that means that line would have to be pulling from somewhere well forward of the boat (such as a tree or an anchor). Anchors used at the time are described as not having much holding power in sandbars and the likelihood of a suitable tree being close enough to be of use seems low. Pilot George Byron Merrick described his experience "sparring off" sandbars in 1854–1863, and Captain Basil Hall described using a spar to get off a sandbar in 1828. They describe canting the spar with its top forward, rather than toward the stern. Merrick describes placing a block (pulley) at the stern of the boat to haul on the line to the spar. This would indicate that in most cases, grasshoppering was used to back the boat off the bar, rather than go forward over it. That would also avoid the risk of moving the boat forward but then getting the center of the boat stuck on the bar.

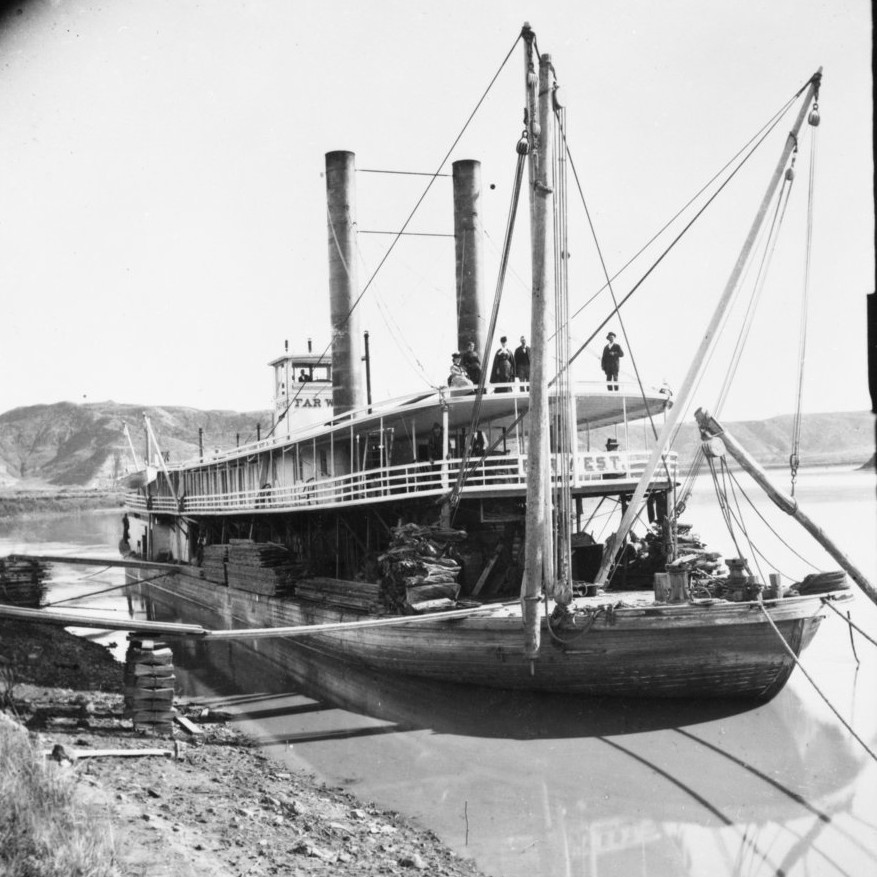
Steamer "Far West," Montana Territory, ca 1870.

Far West gained a place in military and steamboat history during the Great Sioux War of 1876. The Far West was under contract to support a military column of infantry and cavalry units under General Alfred Terry, Colonel John Gibbon and Lt. Colonel George Armstrong Custer. The column was advancing up the Yellowstone, seeking a large Sioux and Cheyenne encampment which was moving along the river drainages to the south. The Far West brought supplies to the column, and it was used by Terry as a headquarters and also to ferry and move troops on the river. On June 21, the Far West was moored on the Yellowstone at the mouth of Rosebud Creek and was the site of the fateful meeting of officers after which Custer and the 7th Cavalry was dispatched south up the Rosebud seeking the Indian encampment. On June 25, 1876, the 7th Cavalry under Custer suffered a disastrous defeat at the Battle of the Little Bighorn . Five of the companies of the 7th were annihilated along with Custer, and the remaining companies suffering significant numbers of dead and wounded. Far West made her way from the Yellowstone up the Bighorn River to the mouth of the Little Bighorn where she was loaded with the wounded from the battle. Traveling night and day, she returned downriver to Bismarck, Dakota Territory, making the 710 mi (1,140 km) run in the record time of 54 hours and bringing the first news of the military defeat which came to be popularly known as the "Custer Massacre".

After 1876 Far West was sold by the Coulson Packet Line. She continued to work on the Yellowstone and the Missouri Rivers for other owners until 1883 when she struck a snag and sank, near St. Charles, Missouri.

== Construction and specifications ==
The Far West was built in Pittsburgh in 1870 for the Coulson Packet Company. The Far West was 190 ft (58 m) long with a beam of 33 ft (10 m) and had three decks, a cupola like pilot house and two tall smoke stacks. She drew only 20 in (51 cm) of water unloaded and 30 in (76 cm) fully loaded with 200 tons of freight. Between her first and second decks were two powerful high-pressure steam engines built by Herbertson Engine Works of Brownsville, Pennsylvania, each with 15-inch-diameter (38 cm) pistons and a 5 ft (1.5 m) stroke. The engines were powered by steam from three boilers that consumed as many as 30 cords of wood a day. The engines drove a single 30-foot-wide (9.1 m) stern wheel. The Far West also had two steam capstans, one on each side of the bow, being the first boat built with more than one.

== Description of decks ==
The steamboat rested in the water on its hull. The hull of the boat was hollow and was used to store cargo. Cargo was often contained in casks or barrels. This storage could only be reached through hatches on the deck, and men working in the hull to store or move cargo could not stand up, but had to work while hunched over or crawling through the hull space.

The platform that closed the top of the hull was the main deck, and the name applied not only to the floor of this space, but also the space between the main deck and the cabin deck, just above the main deck. The main deck had the boilers and the two steam engines which powered the paddle wheel at the rear of the boat. Wood for the boilers was stacked on the main deck. Freight was carried on the main deck. The cheapest passenger accommodations were on the main deck, but the passengers had to find their own space.

Above the main deck on the Far West was the cabin deck. Each side of the boat had a row of small cabins with doors that opened to the outside where there was a covered walkway. Inside the two rows of cabins and between them there was a central cabin — like a long wide hallway running from the front of the boat to the back. Here there was a long table where the cabin passengers and the ships officers were fed, and where they could spend leisure time.

Above the main deck was its roof, known as the hurricane deck, because it was unprotected from the elements. The Far West had no structures on this deck, other than the pilot house. On the Far West the hurricane deck had no cabins, and no "Texas deck" structures.

The pilot house was a cupola like box, with glass-paned windows on all four sides, that perched on the hurricane deck. From this vantage point the river pilot (who has often the captain, in a smaller steamship like the "Far West") guided the boat, while also regulating the power applied to the paddle wheel. The pilot guided the boat using a large spoked wheel, which was connected by a series of ropes or chains to the rudders at the rear of the boat. The pilot also regulated the power applied to the stern paddle wheel, using a voice tube to talk to the engineer, telling him when and in what amount to provide steam to power the stern wheel, and when to stop or reverse the paddle wheel.

Two tall smoke stacks towered above the forward part of the hurricane deck and the 'scape pipes were in the rear, venting steam from the engines.

== Capabilities ==
The Far West was neither graceful nor grand in appearance, but she was strong, powerful, fast, durable and had an enormous capacity for hard work. She had limited accommodation for passengers on her second deck, and consequently she did not have a large central cabin. The absence of these features meant that she had a lower profile, and no "Texas" deck, which resulted in her having less wind resistance and therefore being both faster and more manageable in the high winds that prevailed in Montana and North Dakota during the summer months. She possessed ample freight carrying capacity, and she had a shallow draft.

A unique feature of light river steamboats like the Far West was their ability to "grasshopper" to get across shallow sand bars to reach a deeper river channel beyond the sand bar. In this "grasshopper" maneuver, the boat used spars and steam capstans on the front of the boat to lift and swing the front of the boat onto the sand bar, moving forward a few feet at a time. Once the front of the boat was on the sandbar, when the boat was lifted the current would help dislodge loose sediment under the boat, and often the paddle wheel would be accelerated to generate a current in the water under the boat that would also pull the loose sandbar sediment from under the boat. This process was intended to create enough draft or flotation in the water, so the steamboat could then move forward into the deeper channel beyond the sand bar.

== Ownership ==
Far West was first owned by the Coulson Packet Line which was also known as the Missouri River Transportation Company. The Coulson Packet line sold the Far West to the Northwest Transportation Co. called the Peck Line out of Sioux City/Yankton, ND. The boat was later sold to Capt. Henry M. Dodds and Victor Bonnet.

== Early use ==
In 1870 the Far West made trips to and from Fort Benton, Montana, which was the upper terminus of river travel on the Missouri. In 1872 the Far West made the quickest trip on record from Sioux City, Iowa, to Fort Benton, Montana – seventeen days, twenty hours – with Mark Coulson as master.

== Activities during the Great Sioux War of 1876 ==
In 1876, the Far West was contracted by the United States Army to be part of the Custer/Terry military expedition against the Sioux Indians. The Far West was used to ferry supplies from the rail head at Bismarck up the Missouri to the Montana Territory, and then up the Yellowstone River where the military column was seeking the villages of the Sioux.

The military column led by General Terry and Custer's 7th Cavalry traveled westward over the prairies from Fort Lincoln, Dakota Territory to the Yellowstone River. The Far West, captained by Grant Marsh, brought supplies up the Missouri and Yellowstone river and met the military column at the mouth of Powder River in Montana Territory, near present-day Terry, Montana. General Terry then used the Far West as the expedition's headquarters. On June 21, 1876, at the mouth of the Rosebud a meeting was held on the Far West which mapped out the next steps in the campaign to attempt to find the Sioux/Cheyenne village in the valleys of the Rosebud or the Little Bighorn.

The next day, Custer and the 7th Cavalry rode up Rosebud Creek seeking the Indian villages. Far West was ordered to proceed up the Yellowstone to the Big Horn and then up the Big Horn to the mouth of the Little Big Horn River so that supplies would be close to the area of expected troop activities. On June 25, Custer encountered the Sioux/Cheyenne village on the Little Bighorn river and suffered a disastrous defeat. Unaware of this defeat, Grant Marsh had the "Far West" on station at the mouth of the Little Big Horn on 26 June. While tied along the bank, Curley a Crow scout who had been with Custer, emerged from the willows on the riverbank and came on board and by drawings and signs indicated that Custer had been "wiped out". After General Terry learned of the battle he ordered the Far West to stand by to receive the wounded. On June 29 set about preparing the Far West to become a hospital ship. Captain Marsh ordered grass cut and placed on the decks, and covered with canvas tarpaulins for the wounded, which soon began to arrive from the battle site which was only about 15 mi (24 km) distant. On June 30, 1876, 52 wounded were on board. Casting off from the mouth of the Little Big Horn, Captain Marsh descended 53 mi (85 km) to the column's base camp on the north bank of the Yellowstone River.

The Far West spent the next two days ferrying troops across the Yellowstone and taking on a heavy load of wood to power the two engines. Stacks of cordwood and grain sacks were positioned along the gunwales to protect the wounded from possible Indian attack. Sheets of boiler iron were placed around the pilot house. At 5 p.m. on July 3 Terry ordered the Far West to take the wounded to Bismarck 710 mi (1,140 km)river miles away. Piloted by Grant Marsh and under a full head of steam the "Far West" proceeded down the Yellowstone and then down the Missouri. With only brief stops the Far West arrived at Bismarck in at 11 p.m. on 5 July, after an amazing downriver run of 710 miles in 54 hours which set a record for riverboat travel. Along the way only one trooper died, Private William George and the "Far West" stopped briefly at 4 a.m. on July 4 at "Terry's Landing" at the mouth of the Powder River where Pvt. George's remains was hastily put ashore, (to be buried by the detachment located there) while the "Far West" proceeded on down-river. The "Far West" brought the first news of the Custer disaster, which was promptly put on the telegraph at Bismarck, and received in the east in the afternoon of 6 July, during weekend celebrations of the July 4th, 1876 centennial birthday of the United States. Only 9 days later, Captain Marsh and the Far West steamed back up river with horses and supplies for the Terry column.

== Far West after 1876 ==
The Far West continued to carry freight and passengers on the upper Missouri and Yellowstone, and she continued to set records. In 1881, the Missouri River was so high that the arrival of river boats coming up river was delayed. The Far West was the first boat to reach Fort Benton that year. However, due to the high water it did not arrive until May 19.

== 1883 sinking ==
In October 1883 the Far West hit a snag on the Missouri River, near St. Charles, Missouri, and was lost.

== See also ==
- Grant Marsh
- Joseph LaBarge — famous steamboat captain on the Missouri River, during the same era
