= XHVFC-FM =

Community radio station in Otumba, State of Mexico

Otumba, State of Mexico; Mexico
- Frequency: 102.1 MHz
- Branding: Evolución Radio

Programming
- Format: Noncommercial community radio

Ownership
- Owner: Voz, Flor y Canto, A.C.

History
- First air date: February 2011
- Call sign meaning: Voz, Flor y Canto

Technical information
- Class: D
- ERP: .02 kW

Links
- Website: evolucionr.webcindario.com

XHVFC-FM is a community radio station in Otumba, State of Mexico, broadcasting on 102.1 FM. The permit for the station is held by Voz, Flor y Canto, A.C., and the station is known as Evolución Radio. XHVFC is a member of AMARC México.

== History ==
The station received its permit in March 2010 and came to air in February 2011. The station had been operating without a permit for some time before that.
