= CKGR-FM =

Radio station in Golden, British Columbia

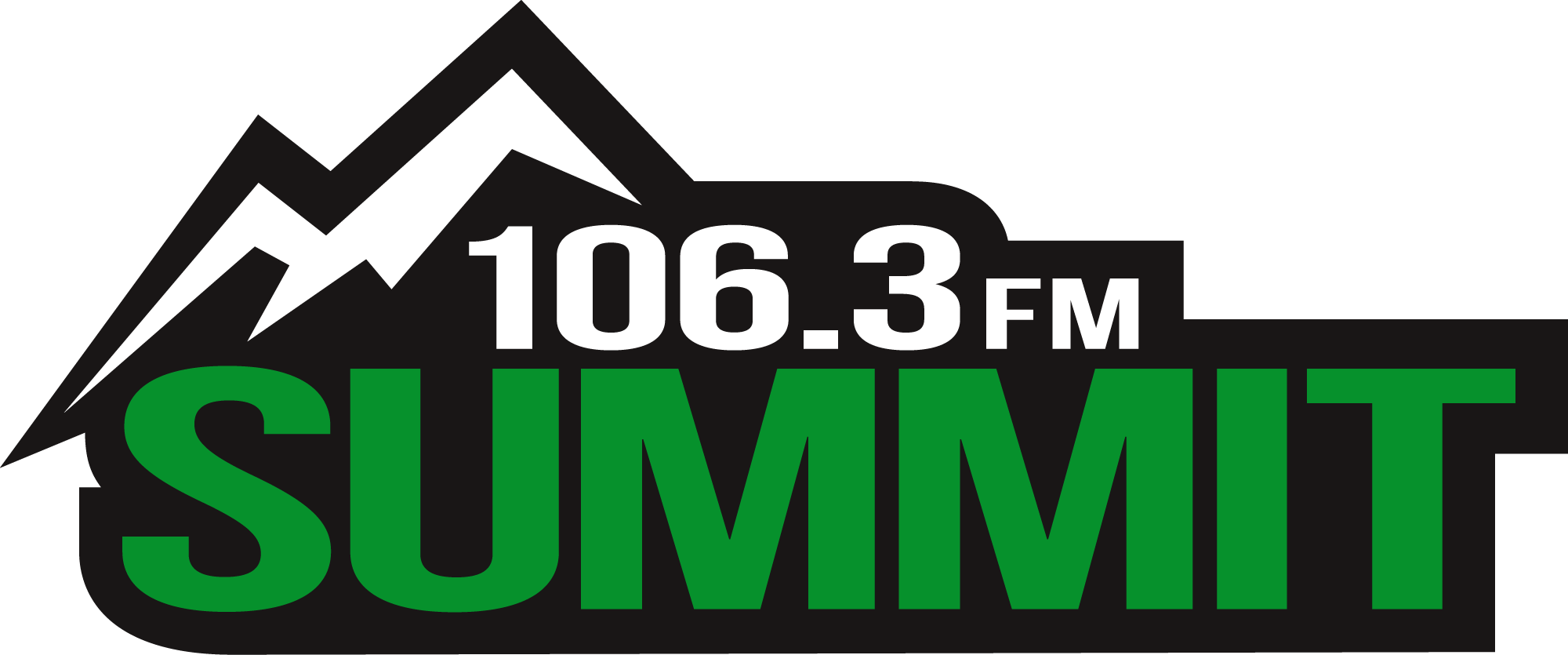
- Golden, British Columbia; Canada
- Broadcast area: Golden and Invermere
- Frequency: 106.3 MHz
- Branding: 106.3 Summit

Programming
- Format: Classic hits

Ownership
- Owner: Vista Radio

History
- First air date: 1974
- Former frequencies: 1400 kHz

Technical information
- Class: A
- ERP: 890 watts horizontal polarization only
- HAAT: −373.3 metres (−1,225 ft)
- Transmitter coordinates: 51.2736°N 116.989°W
- Repeater: CKIR 870 Invermere

Links
- Webcast: Listen Live

CKGR-FM is a Canadian radio station that broadcasts on 106.3 MHz in Golden, British Columbia.

Owned and operated by Vista Radio, the station airs a classic hits format under the on-air brand 106.3 Summit.

CKGR also has an AM rebroadcaster at 870 kHz in Invermere with the call sign CKIR.

== History ==
In 1973, Hall-Gray Broadcasting Co. Ltd. (Bob Hall and Walter Gray) received a licence to operate a new AM station at Golden. CKGR signed on the air in 1974 at 1400 kHz as a rebroadcaster of CKCR-FM. In 1984, CKGR received Canadian Radio-television and Telecommunications Commission (CRTC) approval to broadcast some local content of its own in addition to the content provided from CKCR and add a rebroadcaster of its own at Invermere, operating at 870 kHz with the call sign CKIR.

Over the years, the station went through different ownerships. In October 2007, the assets of Standard Radio, including CKGR, were purchased by Astral Media, and then in 2013 to Bell Media. The station was sold to Vista Radio in 2024, as part of Bell Media cuts.

=== Switch to FM ===
Former "EZ Rock" logo until 2021

On October 15, 2010, CKGR received approval by the CRTC to convert to the FM band at 106.3 MHz with an average effective radiated power of 890 watts to broadcast a soft adult contemporary format targeting adults aged 18 to 54.

As part of a mass format reorganization by Bell Media, on May 18, 2021, CKGR flipped to adult hits, and adopted the Bounce branding.

On February 8, 2024, Bell announced a restructuring that included the sale of 45 of its 103 radio stations to seven buyers, subject to approval by the CRTC, including CKGR, which is to be sold to Vista Radio. The application was approved on February 13, 2025.

The sale took effect April 14, 2025 and Vista rebranded the station to Classic Hits as 106.3 Summit.

== Rebroadcaster ==
Rebroadcasters of CKGR-FM
City of licence	Identifier	Frequency	Power	Class	RECNet	CRTC Decision
Invermere	CKIR	870 AM	250 nighttime watts 1000 daytime watts	C	Query	84-866

== See also ==
- CKXR-FM
