= Grant Marsh =

American riverboat captain (1834–1916)

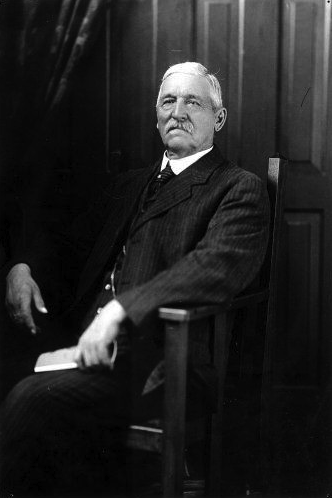
Grant Marsh

Grant Prince Marsh (May 11, 1834 – January 1916) was a riverboat pilot and captain who was noted for his many piloting exploits on the upper Missouri River and the Yellowstone River in the Western United States from 1862 until 1882. He began working as a cabin boy in 1856, eventually becoming a captain, pilot, and owner in a career lasting over sixty years. During that time, he achieved an outstanding record and reputation as a steamboat captain, serving on more than 22 vessels. His piloting exploits became legendary and modern historians have referred to him as "possibly the greatest steamboat man ever", "possibly the greatest [steamboat pilot] ever", "possibly the finest riverboat pilot who ever lived", and "the greatest steamboat master and pilot on both the Missouri and Yellowstone Rivers".

After the discovery of gold in Montana Territory in the early 1860s, the Missouri River became the major artery for freight and passengers traveling from "the states" to Fort Benton, near the head of navigation on the upper river. The last 300 miles ran through a vast unsettled prairie and the remote Missouri breaks. As a riverboat pilot in this wilderness Marsh contended with migrating buffalo herds, hostile Indians, and severe weather including violent windstorms, along with numerous underwater hazards from rapids, snags, and sandbars.

From 1873 to 1879 Marsh piloted shallow-draft paddle wheel steamboats on pioneer voyages up the Yellowstone River in support of several military expeditions into Indian country. In 1875, he made the furthest upriver ascent of the Yellowstone in the Josephine, arriving at a point just above present-day Billings, Montana. Marsh is most often referenced by historians for his exploits in 1876 as the pilot of the Far West, a shallow-draft steamboat operating on the Yellowstone River and its tributaries, which accompanied a U.S. Army column that included Lt. Colonel George Armstrong Custer and the 7th Cavalry. The army column played a major role in the Great Sioux War of 1876, and its most noted battle was the Battle of the Little Bighorn on June 25–26, 1876. After the battle, from June 30 to July 3, Marsh piloted the Far West down the Yellowstone and Missouri Rivers to Bismarck, carrying fifty-one wounded cavalry troopers from the site of Custer's defeat. From Bismarck the first news of the massacre was disseminated to the nation via telegraph. Most noteworthy in riverboat lore, Marsh set a downriver steamboat speed record on this return voyage, traversing some 710 river miles in 54 hours.

After railroads brought about the decline of riverboats on Montana rivers in the 1880s, Marsh continued to work as a steamboat pilot on the Mississippi and the lower Missouri on ferries, snag boats, and hauling bulk loads. He remained a steamboatman until his death in 1916 at the age of 82.

== Early years ==
Grant Marsh began work on the Allegheny River as a cabin boy at the age of 12. He became a first mate and student pilot under Samuel Clemens (Mark Twain) on the Mississippi in 1858. When the Civil War broke out in 1861, he worked on riverboats hauling troops and supplies for the Union during the Fort Donelson and Shiloh campaigns on the Tennessee River. In 1862, he worked on the Mississippi in the Vicksburg campaign. After Vicksburg, he began to work on boats traveling up the Missouri River, hauling army supplies and troops in campaigns against hostile Indians in the Dakota Territory.

== On the Upper Missouri and Yellowstone ==
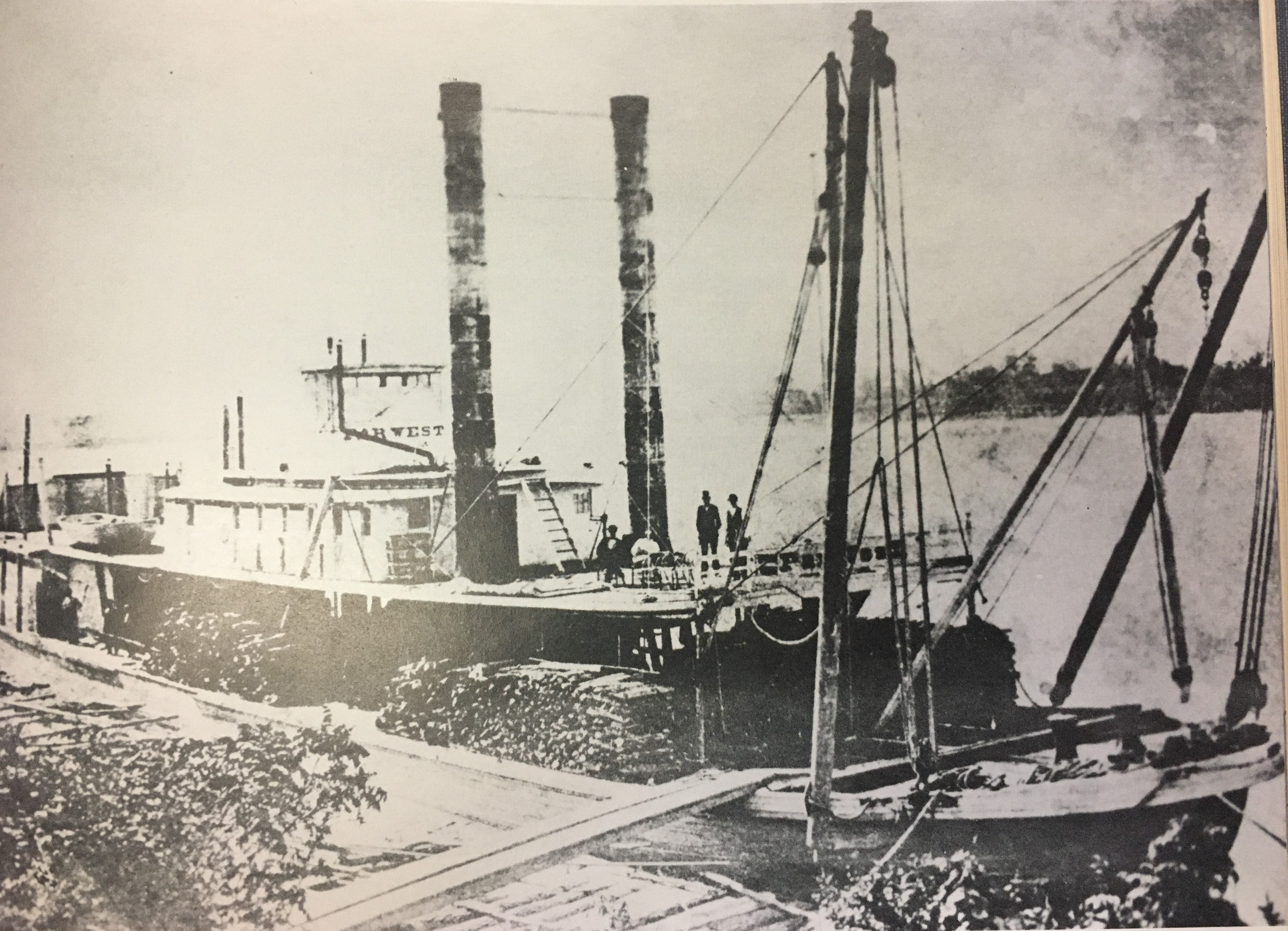
Far West steamboat, ca 1870s. The Far West and other mountain boats were shallow-draft boats designed for the shallow waters of the Missouri River. It was said that all the water their pilots needed for those boats was a "heavy dew."

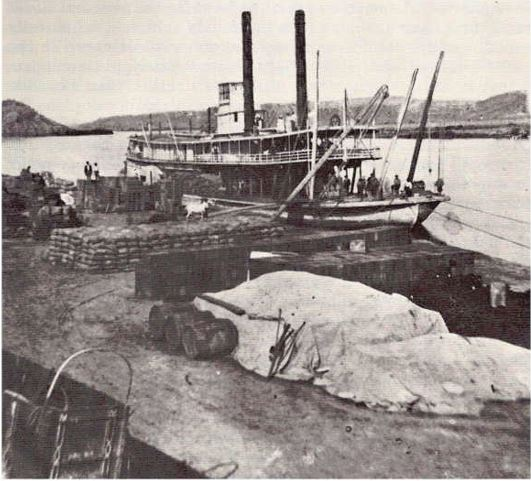
In 1871, Capt. Marsh superintended the construction of the Str. "Nellie Peck" in Brownsville, Pennsylvania. He served as master of the boat, bringing her to the Missouri River in 1871. The boat is pictured at the levee in Ft. Benton in 1872.

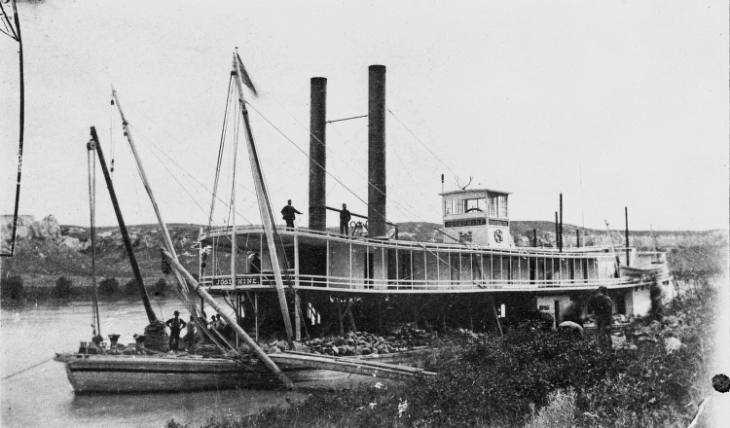
Grant Marsh superintended the construction of the Str. "Josephine" in 1873. That year, she made her first trips up the Yellowstone River under Capt. Marsh for Custer's Seventh Cavalry. In 1875, under Marsh's command, she conducted an exploration of the Yellowstone, going further up the river than any boat before or since. (Montana Historical Society collection)

Gold was first discovered in western Montana in 1862, and immediately there was a great demand for steamboat transport to carry passengers and freight to the "Upper Missouri" River terminus at Fort Benton, Montana. The trip from St. Louis to Fort Benton took 60 days or longer. Freight and passenger rates were high, and steamboat traffic was very lucrative—a single successful trip could pay the entire cost of a shallow-draft stern wheeler riverboat.

There were rapids located in the last 300 river miles that traversed the remote "Missouri breaks" area. Steamboats would leave St. Louis early in the spring and try to get above the rapids on the spring rise in mid to late June. They would then try to get back downstream over the rapids before falling water levels made them more dangerous. A boat that stayed too late risked the rapids in low water, and also becoming icebound as winter set in.

Marsh was a major figure in upper Missouri River steamboat navigation from the earliest days of the Montana gold rush in 1862 until 1888. He was so confident in his piloting skills that he would operate on the upper Missouri late in the season, running the rapids in low water. In 1866 he became captain of the Louella at the age of 34. He brought the Louella to Fort Benton, but then stayed until September, embarking with a load of miners who were catching the last boat of the summer and who had $1,250,000 in gold, the most valuable shipment ever carried on the Missouri.

In 1868, Marsh took the Nile upriver during the fall, wintered the boat there, and successfully returned downriver in the spring, undamaged. In late 1869 he took the North Alabama upstream loaded with vegetables, despite the risk of being icebound, going all the way to the mouth of the Yellowstone River to deliver the fresh provisions to Fort Buford.

Marsh met the special challenges that faced a riverboat pilot/captain on the Upper Missouri and Yellowstone Rivers. He encountered Indians who shot at his boat and was delayed by buffalo herds crossing the river ahead of him. He winched his way up rapids with a current so strong that he had to attach a rope to an upstream tree or a "deadman" planted in the bank. He learned to "grasshopper" his way over sandbars in low water. A number of authors write that in this process, spars were sunk from the prow of the boat down to the river bottom, and then a steam-driven winch and a rope harness over the top of the spar was used to hitch the front of the boat up on the spars and slide it forward for a few feet of progress. This was repeated until the sandbar was crossed.

However, the length and position of the grasshoppering spars at the bow of the boat suggest that if the spars are to be used as a lever to lift/move the boat, it would be to back the boat off the sandbar, rather than attempt to propel it forward over the bar. If the spar were to be used to lever the boat forward, then it would have to be angled with its top toward the stern of the boat and lines attached to the top of it pulling that end of the spar forward. Since the fulcrum of the spar is at the bow of the boat, that means that line would have to be pulling from somewhere well forward of the boat (such as a tree or an anchor). Anchors used at the time are described as not having much holding power in sandbars and the likelihood of a suitable tree being close enough to be of use seems low. Pilot George Byron Merrick described his experience "sparring off" sandbars in 1854-1863, and Captain Basil Hall described using a spar to get off a sandbar in 1828. They describe canting the spar with its top forward, rather than toward the stern. Merrick describes placing a block (pulley) at the stern of the boat to haul on the line to the spar. This would indicate that in most cases, grasshoppering was used to back the boat off the bar, rather than go forward over it. That would also avoid the risk of moving the boat forward but then getting the center of the boat stuck on the bar. It would also avoid subjecting the rudders and paddlewheel to damage.

== Coulson Packet Company ==
In 1871, Captain Marsh went into business with Commodore Sanford B. Coulson, his two brothers, and other noteworthy businessmen to form the Coulson Packet Company, which soon became famous in Missouri River history. Their objective was to establish a company that would have complete domain over the steamboat business on the Upper Missouri. The boats originally owned by this powerful syndicate were the Far West, Nellie Peck, Western, Key West, E. H. Durfee, Sioux City, and Mary McDonald. It should probably be noted that historian William B. Lass recounts the details of the founding of the Coulson Packet Company (aka Missouri River Transportation Company) somewhat differently.

The upstarting company soon established a reputation for reliability in moving freight and in commanding men. During the 1870s they did military contract work, hauling supplies to posts along the Missouri River and ferrying army explorers and survey parties up the Yellowstone River. Assisting in military expeditions, Marsh made many pioneer voyages on the Yellowstone, including the furthest ascent of the Yellowstone (to just above present-day Billings, Montana) in the shallow-draft sternwheel boat Josephine in 1875.

== Piloting the Far West ==
Grant Marsh is most commonly remembered in history as the steamboat pilot/captain of the Far West, which on July 3, 1876, brought the first news to Bismarck of the "Custer Massacre" that had occurred on the Little Bighorn River in the Montana Territory on June 25. Aboard the Far West were fifty U.S. Army troopers wounded in the battle. In an epic feat of riverboat piloting, Marsh brought the Far West from the mouth of the Little Bighorn down the Bighorn River to the Yellowstone River, then to the Missouri, and then to Bismarck. He made the run from the mouth of the Bighorn to Bismarck over a period of 4 days, from June 30 to July 3, 1876. Rarely leaving the wheel, he traversed some 710 river miles in just 54 hours, setting a record for steamboat travel that still stands.

=== Far West and Nellie Peck 2,800-mile race ===
Similar in design to the Far West, the Nellie Peck was also a sternwheel packet, built in 1871 at Brownsville, Pennsylvania, and whose construction was supervised by Captain Marsh. That year Nellie Peck made her first journey up the Missouri River to Fort Benton. She made 13 more trips there during her career.

== Later career ==
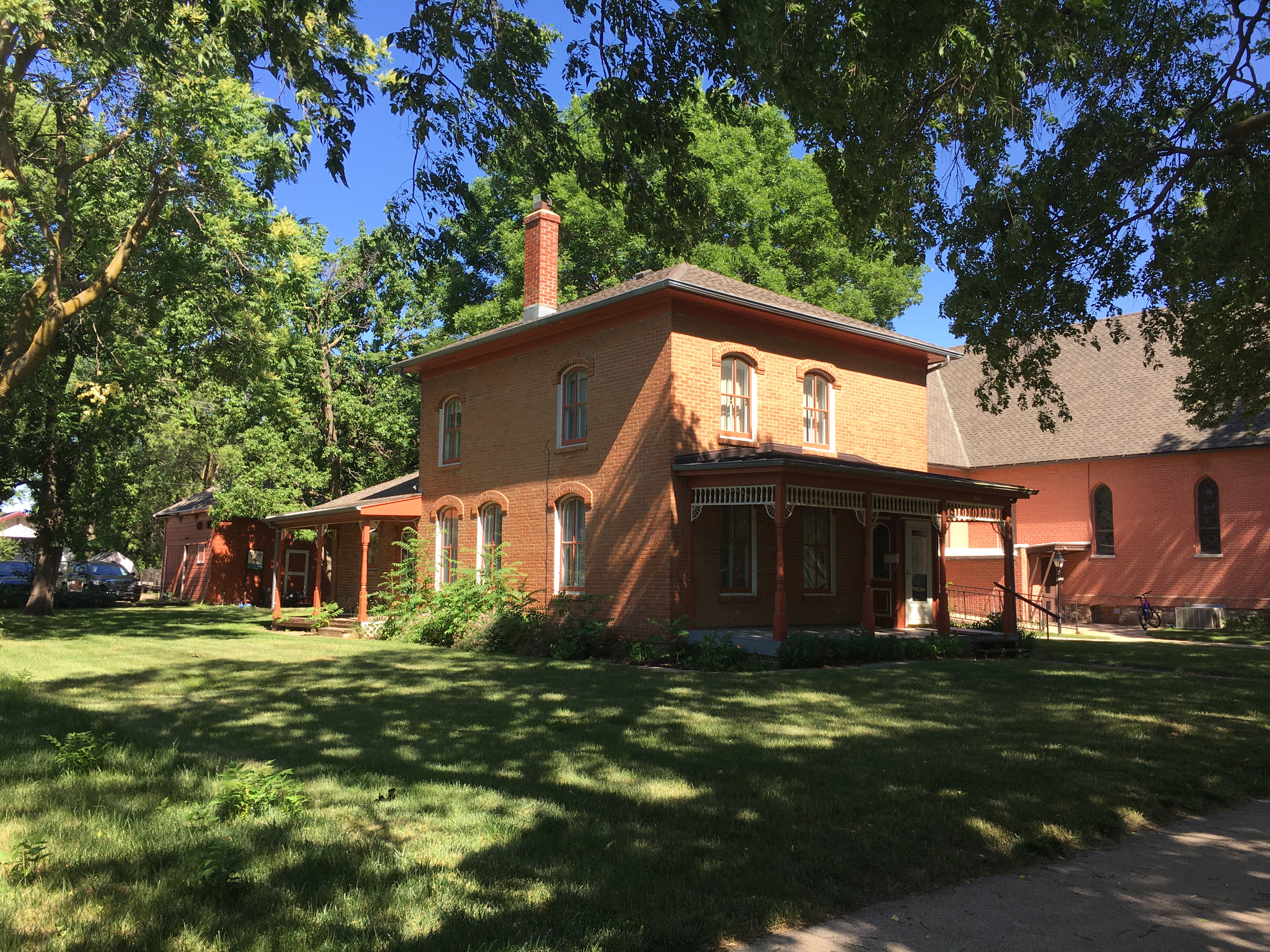
Grant Marsh home, 513 Douglas St., Yankton, South Dakota. The home is used as an office and classroom by the adjacent Christ Episcopal Church.

After 1876, Marsh continued to work on the Missouri River. Late in 1877, he left the Coulson Packet Company, and in the spring of 1878 signed on with Joseph Leighton and Walter B. Jordan, who were Indian traders at Fort Buford, Dakota Territory. The traders wanted to get into the transport business, and they had purchased a steamboat that was being constructed in the Pittsburgh boat yards, the F.Y. Batchelor. Marsh traveled to Pittsburgh and brought the boat to the Dakota Territory. In 1878, 1879, 1880, and 1881, he piloted the F.Y. Batchelor up the Missouri and then up the Yellowstone, bringing supplies to Fort Keogh (near present-day Miles City, Montana) and Fort Custer (near present-day Hardin, Montana).

In August 1878, Marsh set another steamboat speed record when he piloted the Batchelor upstream from Bismarck to Fort Buford, a distance of 307 miles, in 55 hours and 25 minutes. This established a new speed record for upstream steamboat travel on the Missouri and Yellowstone Rivers.

In 1879, Marsh purchased a ferry boat, the Andrew S. Bennett, which was in service between Bismarck and Mandan on the Missouri River. He hired a pilot to operate the ferry while he continued to pilot the F.Y. Batchelor on the Missouri and Yellowstone.

In 1881 and 1882, the Northern Pacific Railway built west from Bismarck to the Yellowstone River valley, and then up the valley and over the continental divide. This ended riverboat traffic on the Yellowstone River.

In 1882, Marsh purchased his own riverboat, the W.J. Behan, and continued to haul freight and passengers on the Missouri River out of Bismarck. In 1882 the Sioux Chief Sitting Bull returned from Canada where he had sought refuge in 1877 following the Battle of the Little Bighorn. He surrendered to the Army at Fort Randall with his remaining followers. In late April 1883, Marsh accepted an assignment to take the W.J. Behan up the Missouri to Fort Randall and transport Sitting Bull downstream to the Standing Rock Reservation.

In 1883, as Missouri steamboat traffic declined with the expansion of railroad lines through the Dakota Territory and into the Montana Territory, Marsh sold the W.J. Behan and moved from Bismarck to Memphis, Tennessee, and then to St. Louis. There were still opportunities for a steamboat pilot on the Mississippi River, and Marsh continued to work. For the next dozen years, he operated ferry boats and tugboats on the Mississippi, and following this he did a variety of jobs.

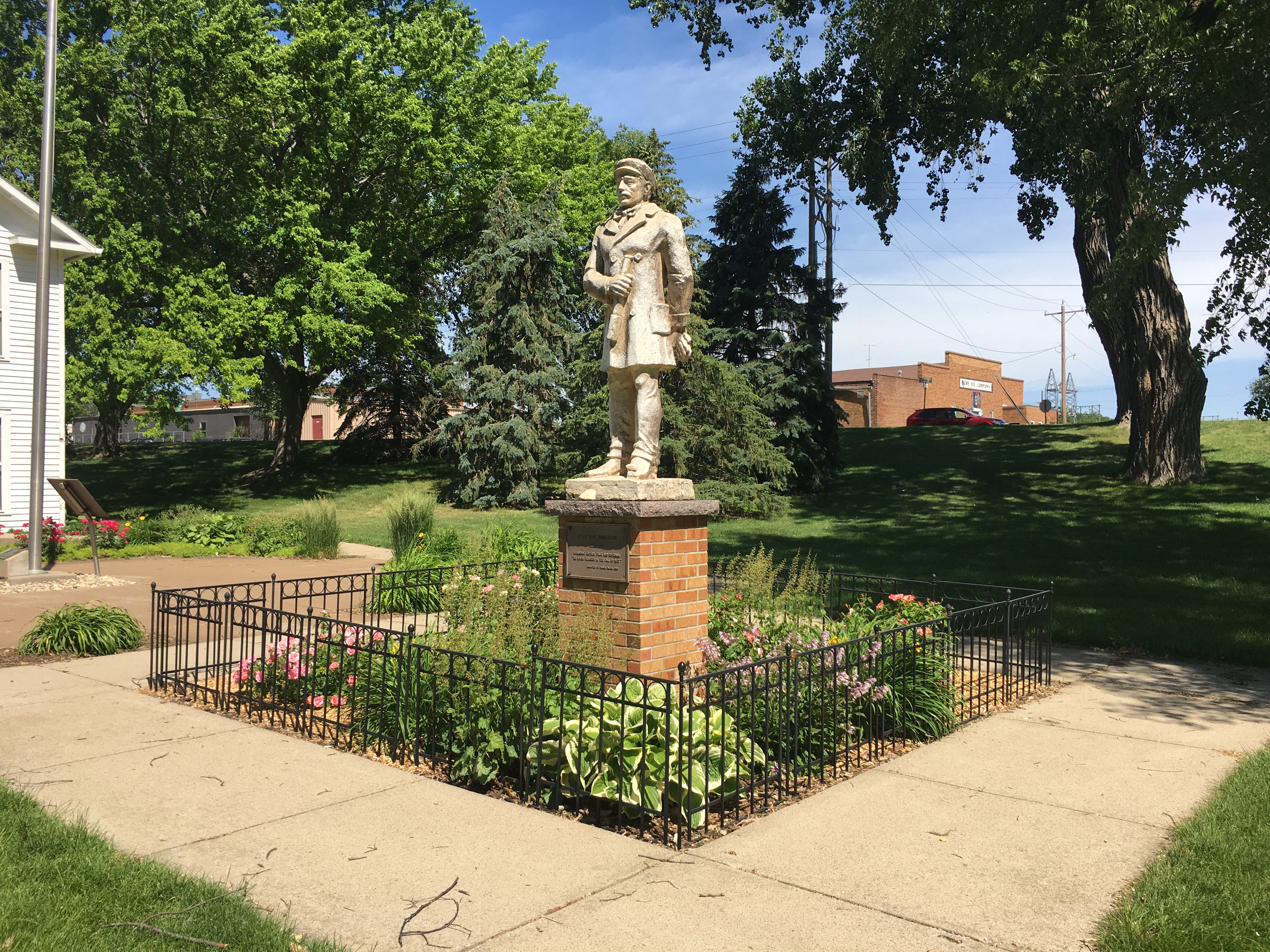
This statue of Grant Marsh is in Riverside Park, Douglas Avenue & Levee Street, Yankton, South Dakota.

In 1901, William D. Washburn, a businessman, had built a railroad to the Missouri River above Bismarck and bought a large tract of land in the area that was rapidly being settled. Washburn also bought several small light-draft steamboats and barges to haul lumber and merchandise upriver from Bismarck to the settlers, and to bring down grain and other produce. Washburn sought out Marsh in St. Louis and importuned him to return to Bismarck in his employ as a riverboat captain. In 1902, Marsh returned to Bismarck and to his career on the Upper Missouri in command of the snag-boat Choctaw. Washburn sold out his interests in Dakota in 1904 to the Minneapolis and St. Paul Railroad, which immediately sold all the steamboats and barges to Isaac P. Baker, who reorganized as the Benton Packet Company. The Missouri River valley was filling with homesteaders who were taking up land on both the east and west banks of the river. These new communities were not served by any railroad and Baker saw an opportunity to provide passenger and freight transport to this growing population extending along both banks of the Missouri River. Baker enlarged the company to include five steamboats, six barges, and two ferryboats.

Marsh continued with the Benton Packet Company, serving at one time or another as captain/pilot of each of the five steamboats. He also operated a "snag" boat that traveled up and down the river, removing sunken "snag" trees and other underwater obstacles.

In 1907, Marsh resigned his position with the Benton Packet Company and on August 23, he went aboard his former boat, Expansion, and confronted the pilot, William R. Massie, who he felt was being abusive. Massie subsequently charged Marsh with assault, and at a hearing before the Department of Commerce and Labor on December 6, 1907, Marsh's license was revoked.

== Death and burial ==
On January 6, 1916, Grant Marsh died in Bismarck, North Dakota. He was reported to have "died in near poverty", as Issac P. Baker, his former manager at the Benton Packet Company, laid claim to much of his estate because of unpaid bills. Marsh had asked to be buried on Wagon Wheel Bluff overlooking the Missouri, but he was buried in a simple grave in Bismarck's St. Mary's Cemetery. It is one of the higher spots in Bismarck and has a view of the Missouri. A large rock serves as his tombstone. The rock is engraved with an image of a riverboat.

== Memorials ==
Grant Marsh is remembered by many statues and placenames:

- The Grant Marsh Bridge on Interstate 94 over the Missouri River at Bismarck, North Dakota, was constructed in 1965 as part of the I-94 highway project.
- A life-sized statue of Grant Marsh overlooks the Missouri River at Riverside Park in Yankton, South Dakota. The inscription reads, "Captain Grant Prince Marsh, 1834–1916, Steamboat captain, Pilot and Riverman. 'He never flinched at the call of duty'. Sculpted by Frank Yaggie 1989."
- The Grant Marsh fishing access and wildlife management area is on the Bighorn River, seven miles north of Hardin, Montana.
- The now-abandoned railroad station and ghost town of Marsh in Dawson County, Montana, was on the Northern Pacific Railroad, midway between Terry and Glendive.
- A Liberty Ship, built in 1943 during World War II, was initially named for Grant P. Marsh at the start of its construction, but was completed as the Valery Chkalov and given as part of a loan to the USSR.

== See also ==
- Paddle steamer
- Great Sioux War of 1876
- Battle of the Little Bighorn
- Joseph LaBarge, famous riverboat captain on the Missouri River, whose brother, John, once partnered with Captain Marsh

== Sources ==
- Hanson, Joseph Mills (1876). The conquest of the Missouri; being the story of the life and exploits of Captain Grant Marsh. Chicago, A.C. McClurg & Co.
