= Yellowstone Public Radio =

Public radio network in Montana, US

- Type: Public Radio Network
- Country: United States
- Broadcast area: Montana; Idaho; Wyoming

Programming
- Affiliations: National Public Radio

Ownership
- Owner: Montana State University-Billings

Links
- Webcast: Available on website
- Website: ypradio.org

Yellowstone Public Radio (YPR) is a regional radio network based in Billings, Montana with transmitters covering most of Montana, as well as northern Wyoming and eastern Idaho. It is operated by Montana State University Billings. It airs a mix of programming from National Public Radio, classical music, and jazz. Its headquarters are located inside the Joseph S. Sample Studios west of the MSU Billings campus on Mabara Lane off Normal Avenue in north-central Billings.

== History ==
The network's first station, KEMC in Billings, signed on in 1972 as a 10-watt station owned by what was then Eastern Montana College. It boosted its power to 24,500 watts in 1978. It gradually transitioned from a college radio station to a more professional operation. This culminated in 1984, when it hired a professional station manager and joined National Public Radio, becoming the state's second NPR member. Over the next decade, it boosted its signal to 100,000 watts, and built a network of translators and repeaters across Montana, and now has one of the largest geographical coverage areas in the entire NPR system. Shortly after EMC merged with the Montana State University System, KEMC rebranded itself Yellowstone Public Radio, reflecting that its coverage area spanned across most of the area around Yellowstone National Park. In the same year, its home since 1983, a three-story house west of campus, was renamed the Joseph L. Sample Studios in honor of the Montana broadcasting pioneer.

== Stations and translators ==
Yellowstone Public Radio is broadcast by twelve full-power stations. The network is also relayed by an additional 28 translators to widen its broadcast area.

Call sign	Frequency	City of license	State	Facility ID	ERP W	Height m (ft)	Class	Transmitter coordinates
KYPB	89.3 FM	Big Timber	Montana	174918	500	126 m (413 ft)	A	45°45′1″N 109°57′16″W
KEMC (Note: Flagship station)	91.7 FM	Billings	Montana	43571	100,000	158 m (518 ft)	C1	45°39′31″N 108°34′14″W
KBMC	102.1 FM	Bozeman	Montana	43572	20,500	222 m (728 ft)	C2	45°38′18″N 111°16′5″W
KYPC	89.9 FM	Colstrip	Montana	172568	3,500	357 m (1,171 ft)	C2	45°50′17″N 106°54′16″W
KGLZ	89.1 FM	East Helena	Montana	173818	140 vertical only	668 m (2,192 ft)	C3	46°49′30″N 111°42′13″W
KYPH	88.5 FM	Helena	Montana	174030	5,200	576 m (1,890 ft)	C1	46°44′53″N 112°19′49″W
KYPX	106.5 FM	Helena Valley Southeast	Montana	189560	1,800	652 m (2,139 ft)	C2	46°49′30″N 111°42′13″W
KYPM	89.9 FM	Livingston	Montana	172578	1,900	265 m (869 ft)	C3	45°35′51″N 110°32′45″W
KYPR	90.7 FM	Miles City	Montana	42382	500	153 m (502 ft)	A	46°23′22″N 105°45′22″W
KYPF	89.5 FM	Stanford/Lewistown	Montana	172585	4,000	576 m (1,890 ft)	C1	47°10′39″N 109°32′9″W
KYPW	88.3 FM	Wolf Point	Montana	172712	730	59 m (194 ft)	A	48°02′8″N 105°31′13″W
KPRQ	88.1 FM	Sheridan	Wyoming	89885	450	341 m (1,119 ft)	A	44°37′26″N 107°07′2″W
KYPZ	96.1 FM	Fort Benton	Montana	164087	100	7 m (23 ft)	C1	47°50′8″N 110°39′10″W

Notes:

Broadcast translators
Call sign	Frequency (MHz)	City of license	State	Facility ID	Rebroadcasts
K206BN	89.1	Ashland	Montana	43575	KYPR
K242DC	96.3	Big Sky	Montana	18326	KBMC
K213AU	90.5	Big Timber	Montana	64316	KEMC
K255CW	98.9	Billings	Montana	93794	KEMC
K251CU	98.1	Bozeman	Montana	18324	KBMC
K220FL	91.9	Broadus	Montana	43574	KYPR
K261CC	100.1	Chester	Montana	55091	KEMC
K203AF	88.5	Colstrip	Montana	18320	KEMC
K203AI	88.5	Columbus	Montana	18321	KEMC
K217FH	91.3	Conrad	Montana	92690	KEMC
K205BZ	88.9	Cut Bank	Montana	18333	KEMC
K216CH	91.1	Emigrant	Montana	18315	KBMC
K216DC	91.1	Forsyth	Montana	43573	KEMC
K220DN	91.9	Glasgow	Montana	18312	KEMC
K203AS	88.5	Glendive	Montana	15868	KEMC
K208DJ	89.5	Great Falls	Montana	84903	KEMC
K219FF	91.7	Havre	Montana	122867	KEMC
K203AE	88.5	Lewistown	Montana	18316	KEMC
K204GR	88.7	Livingston	Montana	18322	KBMC
K206BA	89.1	Red Lodge	Montana	18318	KEMC
K212BC	90.3	Shelby	Montana	18325	KEMC
K220DF	91.9	Terry	Montana	15867	KEMC
K290CA	105.9	West Yellowstone	Montana	155899	KBMC
K220DK	91.9	Buffalo	Wyoming	55092	KEMC
K203AH	88.5	Cody	Wyoming	18328	KEMC
K218ES	91.5	Greybull	Wyoming	18323	KEMC
K285AF	104.9	Mammoth Hot Springs	Wyoming	39762	KEMC
K214EZ	90.7	Worland	Wyoming	18329	KEMC
