= XHYO-FM =

Radio station in Huatabampo, Sonora

XHYO-FM / XEYO-AM
- Huatabampo, Sonora; Mexico
- Frequency: 102.1 FM / 560 AM
- Branding: Radio Lobo

Programming
- Format: Grupera

Ownership
- Owner: Manuel Oswaldo Alvarado Quintero

History
- First air date: March 16, 1990 (concession); January 2016 (FM)

Technical information
- Licensing authority: CRT
- Class: B1 (FM); C (AM)
- Power: 1,000 watts day/500 watts night
- ERP: 25 kW
- HAAT: 87.47 m (287.0 ft)
- Transmitter coordinates: 26°45′18″N 109°37′26″W

XHYO-FM/XEYO-AM is a radio station on 102.1 FM and 560 AM in Huatabampo, Sonora. It is owned by Manuel Oswaldo Alvarado Quintero and known as Radio Lobo with a grupera format.

== History ==
XEYO received its concession on March 16, 1990. The station was approved to migrate to FM in September 2013 and signed on in January 2016.
