= XHPIC-FM =

Radio Chiapas station in Pichucalco, Chiapas

- Pichucalco, Chiapas, Mexico; Mexico
- Broadcast area: Pichucalco, Chiapas
- Frequency: 102.1 FM
- Branding: Frecuencia V Norte

Programming
- Format: Public radio

Ownership
- Owner: Government of the State of Chiapas

History
- First air date: August 25, 2003
- Call sign meaning: PIChucalco

Technical information
- ERP: 50 kW
- Transmitter coordinates: 17°30′22″N 93°07′14.7″W

Links
- Website: XHPIC-FM

XHPIC-FM is a radio station on 102.1 FM in Pichucalco, Chiapas, in Mexico. It is part of the state-owned Radio Chiapas state network and is known as Frecuencia V Norte.

XHPIC was established in 2003.
