= KYPX (FM) =

- Helena Valley Southeast, Montana; United States
- Broadcast area: Helena, Montana
- Frequency: 106.5 MHz
- Branding: Yellowstone Public Radio

Programming
- Format: Public radio

Ownership
- Owner: Montana State University Billings

History
- First air date: 2014
- Former call signs: KKRK (2013–2017)

Technical information
- Licensing authority: FCC
- Facility ID: 189560
- Class: C2
- ERP: 1,800 watts
- HAAT: 652 meters (2,139 ft)
- Transmitter coordinates: 46°49′30″N 111°42′13″W

Links
- Public license information: Public file; LMS
- Webcast: Listen Live
- Website: ypradio.org

KYPX is an American radio station licensed to Helena Valley Southeast, Montana, serving Helena, Montana. KYPX is owned and operated by Montana State University Billings, and broadcasts a public radio format from Yellowstone Public Radio.

On April 5, 2017, Montana Radio Company announced that it would acquire Cherry Creek Media's Helena stations KCAP, KZMT, and KBLL-FM. To comply with ownership limits, it announced that the then-KKRK's license would be divested to Yellowstone Public Radio, and KKRK's format and programming would be re-located.

Montana State University Billings consummated the acquisition of KKRK and KVMO on July 28, 2017, at which point the station changed its call sign to KYPX. It switched its format to Yellowstone Public Radio in August 2017.
