= Fort Benton, Montana =

City in Montana, United States

Fort Benton
- City
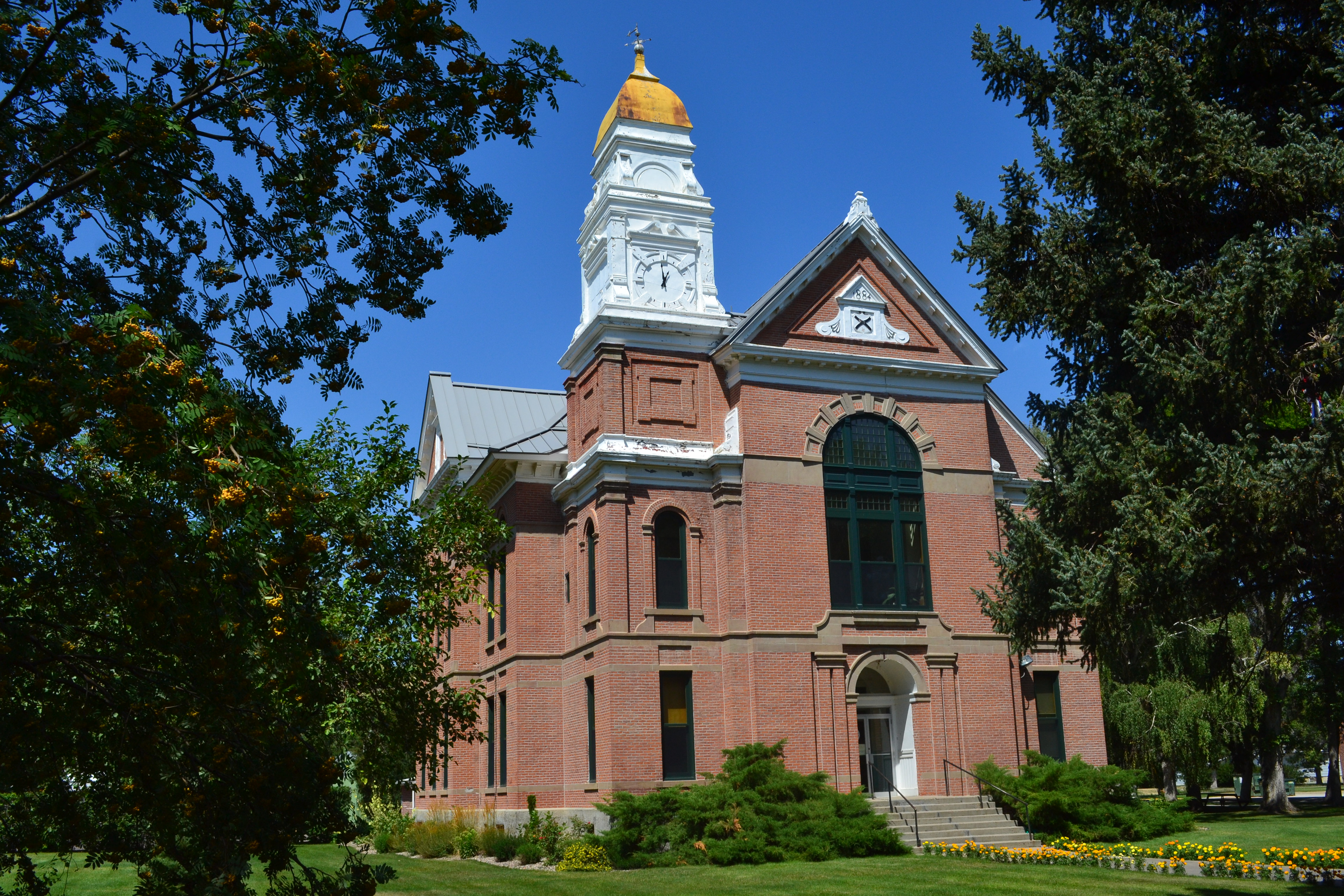
- Chouteau County Courthouse
- Nickname: "The Birth Place Of Montana"
- Location of Fort Benton, Montana
- Coordinates: 47°49′44″N 110°39′21″W
- Country: United States
- State: Montana
- County: Chouteau

Area
  - Total: 2.29 sq mi (5.94 km^{2})
  - Land: 2.29 sq mi (5.94 km^{2})
  - Water: 0 sq mi (0.00 km^{2})
- Elevation: 2,651 ft (808 m)

Population (2020)
  - Total: 1,449
  - Density: 631.9/sq mi (243.97/km^{2})
- Time zone: UTC-7 (Mountain (MST))
  - Summer (DST): UTC-6 (MDT)
- ZIP code: 59442
- Area code: 406
- FIPS code: 30-28000
- GNIS feature ID: 2410524
- Website: www.fortbenton.com

- Fort Benton
- U.S. National Register of Historic Places
- U.S. National Historic Landmark District
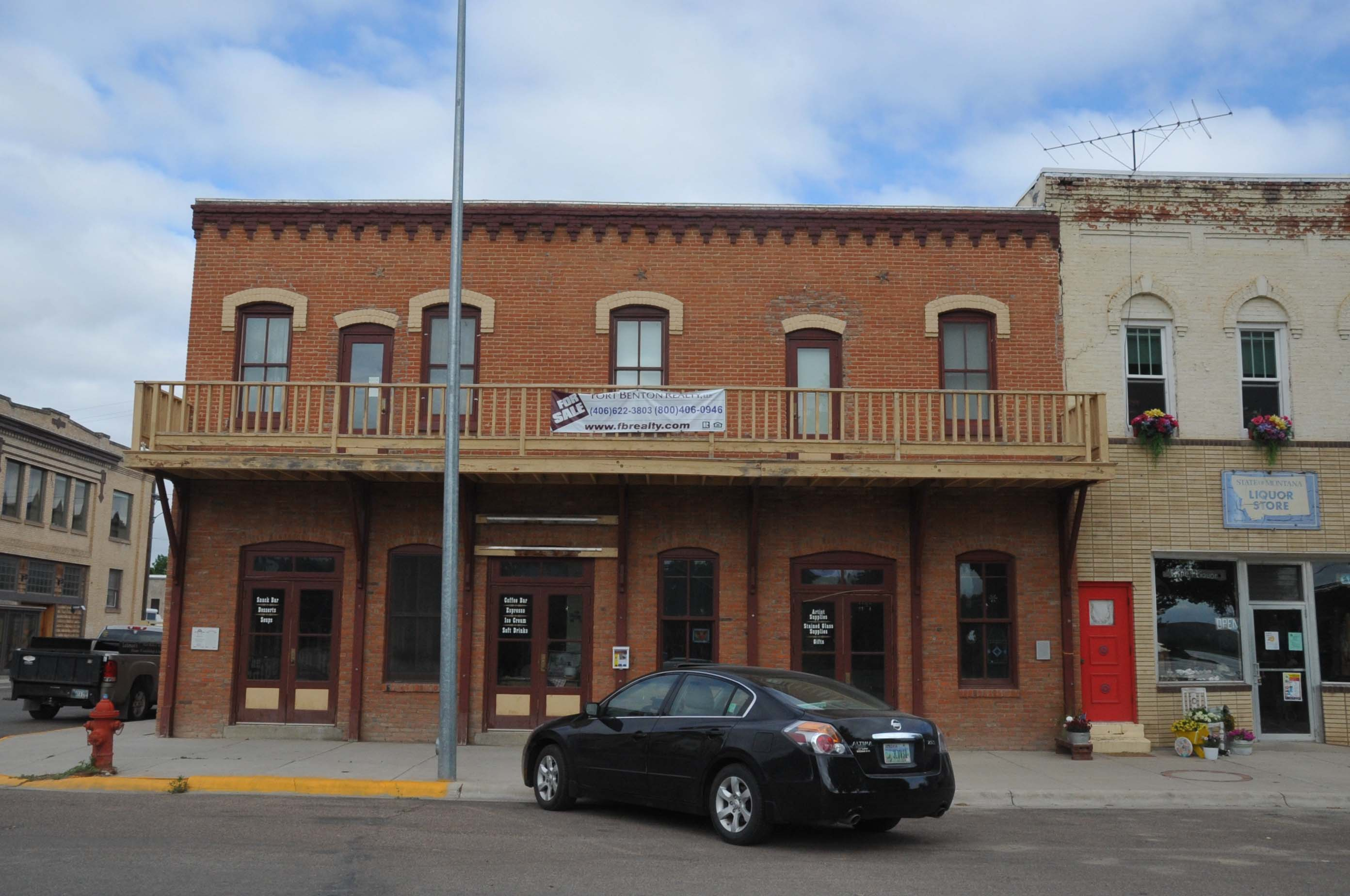

- Location within Montana Location within the United States
- Location: Fort Benton, Montana
- Built: 1846
- NRHP reference No.: 66000431

Significant dates
- Added to NRHP: October 15, 1966
- Designated NHLD: November 15, 1961

Fort Benton is a city in and the county seat of Chouteau County, Montana, United States. Established in 1846, Fort Benton is the oldest continuously occupied settlement in Montana. Fort Benton was the most upstream navigable port on the Mississippi River System, and is considered "the world’s innermost port".

The city's waterfront area, the most important aspect of its 19th century growth, was designated the Fort Benton Historic District, a National Historic Landmark, in 1961.

The population was 1,449 at the 2020 census.

== History ==
Established in 1846 as Fort Lewis and relocated 15 miles downstream in 1847 by Alexander Culbertson, who worked for Auguste Chouteau and Pierre Chouteau, Jr. of St. Louis, the original fort was the last fur trading post on the Upper Missouri River, which soon made it an important economic center. For 30 years, the port attracted steamboats carrying goods, merchants, gold miners and settlers, coming from New Orleans, Memphis, St. Louis, Hannibal, Bismarck, and Kansas City, among other places. As the eastern terminus for the 642-mile-long Mullan Road, completed by the United States Army in 1860, and at the head of navigation of the Missouri River, Fort Benton was part of the overland link between the Missouri and the Columbia River, with its own head of navigation at Fort Walla Walla in Washington. Twenty thousand migrants used the road to travel to the Northwest in its first year. It became an important route for miners from both directions going into the interior of Idaho and north to Canada. Steamboat travel to Fort Benton from St. Louis, Missouri, helped broadly fuel the development of the American West between 1860 and 1890, when it was supplanted by railroad transport. The river was an important route for miners to the newly discovered gold fields of southern Montana at what became Bannack and Virginia City beginning in 1862, and Helena beginning in 1865.

With the decline of the fur trade, the American Fur Company sold the fort to the Northwest Fur Company in 1865, and the fort became a U.S. Army post from 1868 until the army units departed in 1881. Founder Alexander Culbertson formally named it Fort Benton on Christmas Day 1850, in honor of Senator Thomas Hart Benton of Missouri. Beginning in the early 1860s, with the arrival of the first steamboats, a town began to grow up around the fort. Besides being one of the most important ports on the Missouri-Mississippi river system, Fort Benton was once the "World's Innermost Port" – the furthest point of navigable water on the Missouri River. It was served by numerous well-known "mountain boats" (designed specifically for the Missouri River), including the Yellowstone and the Far West, and their famed captains, Joseph LaBarge and Grant Marsh, respectively.

Fort Benton's importance in trade was superseded by the construction of transcontinental railroads in the late 19th century. In 1867, Fort Benton was the site where Union General Thomas Francis Meagher, then acting governor of Montana Territory, fell overboard from his steamboat and drowned in the river; his body was never recovered.

=== Conflict with Natives ===
In 1869, Mountain Chief, then Chief of the Pikuni Blackfeet Indians, travelled to the town of Fort Benton to request the agent of his reservation to remove illegal whiskey traders from Blackfeet land. The chief was physically assaulted by a gang of white residents. In the same year, Mountain Chief's brother and a teenage boy were assassinated in Fort Benton, supposedly in retaliation for the death of a white cattle rancher near to the town. In both cases, officials neglected to file criminal charges on behalf of these three Blackfeet Indians. In 1870, a group of 10 Blackfeet Indians would be killed by Fort Benton soldiers and vigilantes for the alleged crime of cattle raiding.

== Geography ==
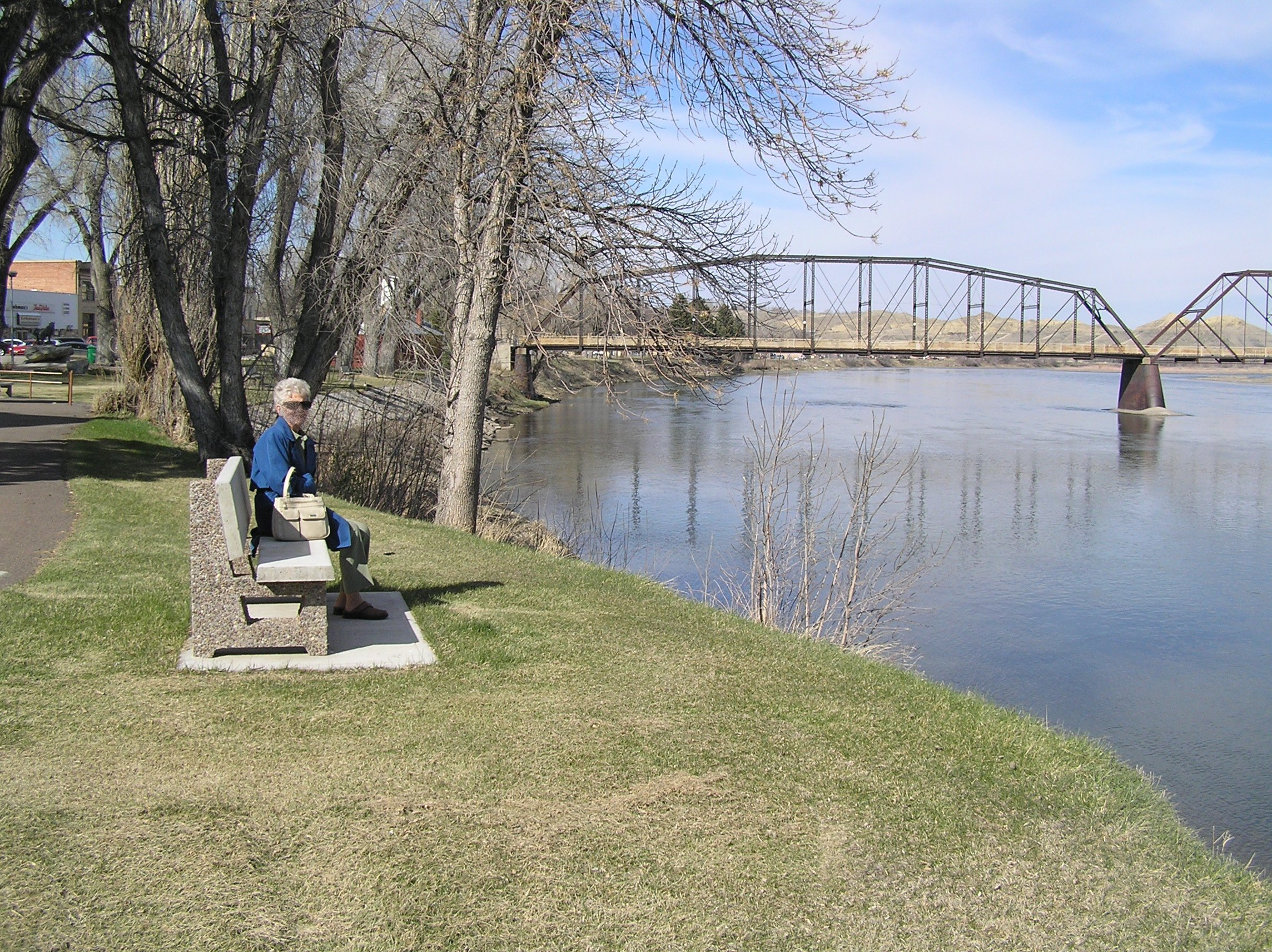
The Missouri River as seen from near the Grand Union Hotel, Fort Benton, Montana

Fort Benton is located off U.S. Route 87

According to the United States Census Bureau, the city has a total area of 2.07 square miles (5.36 km^{2}), all land.

The community sits in a narrow river valley on the west bank of the Missouri River and is in a geographic area known as the Golden Triangle (one of several dozen folk regions of Montana) due to the strength of the wheat industry of the region. For example, in 2007, Chouteau County was one of two counties in the United States with the highest wheat production. The long summer days (due to being at almost 48 degrees N latitude) and fertile soil of the area (due in part to ash deposits from the Elkhorn Volcanics to the south) leads to exceptionally "hard" wheat (high protein content) thriving in the area.

=== Climate ===
Fort Benton experiences a semi-arid climate (Köppen BSk) with cold, dry winters and hot, wetter summers. On July 5, 1988, the Fort Benton area was struck by an F3 tornado that injured two people.

Climate data for Fort Benton, Montana, 1991–2020 normals, extremes 1894–present
Month	Jan	Feb	Mar	Apr	May	Jun	Jul	Aug	Sep	Oct	Nov	Dec	Year
Record high °F (°C)	71 (22)	77 (25)	83 (28)	93 (34)	97 (36)	108 (42)	107 (42)	109 (43)	104 (40)	94 (34)	79 (26)	73 (23)	109 (43)
Mean maximum °F (°C)	59.9 (15.5)	61.4 (16.3)	70.8 (21.6)	79.5 (26.4)	85.8 (29.9)	92.1 (33.4)	99.3 (37.4)	98.9 (37.2)	93.9 (34.4)	82.7 (28.2)	68.5 (20.3)	60.4 (15.8)	100.8 (38.2)
Mean daily maximum °F (°C)	34.6 (1.4)	38.1 (3.4)	48.2 (9.0)	58.6 (14.8)	68.3 (20.2)	76.3 (24.6)	86.4 (30.2)	85.5 (29.7)	74.2 (23.4)	59.9 (15.5)	46.5 (8.1)	36.7 (2.6)	59.4 (15.2)
Daily mean °F (°C)	22.3 (−5.4)	25.3 (−3.7)	34.3 (1.3)	44.6 (7.0)	54.4 (12.4)	62.5 (16.9)	70.3 (21.3)	68.8 (20.4)	58.3 (14.6)	45.2 (7.3)	33.7 (0.9)	24.9 (−3.9)	45.4 (7.4)
Mean daily minimum °F (°C)	10.1 (−12.2)	12.6 (−10.8)	20.3 (−6.5)	30.6 (−0.8)	40.6 (4.8)	48.6 (9.2)	54.1 (12.3)	52.1 (11.2)	42.3 (5.7)	30.5 (−0.8)	21.0 (−6.1)	13.1 (−10.5)	31.3 (−0.4)
Mean minimum °F (°C)	−18.5 (−28.1)	−10.6 (−23.7)	−0.4 (−18.0)	15.3 (−9.3)	27.1 (−2.7)	37.6 (3.1)	44.3 (6.8)	40.8 (4.9)	30.0 (−1.1)	13.2 (−10.4)	−2.9 (−19.4)	−12.4 (−24.7)	−26.1 (−32.3)
Record low °F (°C)	−49 (−45)	−45 (−43)	−35 (−37)	−8 (−22)	14 (−10)	27 (−3)	34 (1)	29 (−2)	17 (−8)	−15 (−26)	−29 (−34)	−45 (−43)	−49 (−45)
Average precipitation inches (mm)	0.52 (13)	0.44 (11)	0.56 (14)	1.48 (38)	2.08 (53)	2.62 (67)	1.19 (30)	1.16 (29)	1.20 (30)	0.92 (23)	0.58 (15)	0.47 (12)	13.22 (335)
Average snowfall inches (cm)	7.9 (20)	6.9 (18)	4.3 (11)	3.0 (7.6)	0.3 (0.76)	0.0 (0.0)	0.0 (0.0)	0.0 (0.0)	0.3 (0.76)	1.9 (4.8)	5.7 (14)	7.9 (20)	38.2 (96.92)
Average precipitation days (≥ 0.01 in)	5.4	5.7	5.8	8.4	9.8	11.0	5.7	6.3	6.6	7.0	5.5	5.1	82.3
Average snowy days (≥ 0.1 in)	5.1	5.5	3.1	2.0	0.2	0.0	0.0	0.0	0.1	1.2	3.0	4.7	24.9
Source 1: NOAA
Source 2: National Weather Service

== Demographics ==
Historical population
Census	Pop.	Note	%±
1880	1,618		—
1890	624		−61.4%
1900	1,024		64.1%
1910	1,004		−2.0%
1920	1,065		6.1%
1930	1,109		4.1%
1940	1,227		10.6%
1950	1,522		24.0%
1960	1,887		24.0%
1970	1,863		−1.3%
1980	1,693		−9.1%
1990	1,660		−1.9%
2000	1,594		−4.0%
2010	1,464		−8.2%
2020	1,449		−1.0%
U.S. Decennial Census

=== 2010 census ===
As of the census of 2010, there were 1,464 people, 686 households, and 412 families residing in the city. The population density was 707.2 inhabitants per square mile (273.1/km^{2}). There were 811 housing units at an average density of 391.8 per square mile (151.3/km^{2}). The racial makeup of the city was 97.4% White, 0.1% African American, 0.5% Native American, 0.2% Asian, 0.1% from other races, and 1.7% from two or more races. Hispanic or Latino of any race were 0.6% of the population.

There were 686 households, of which 20.8% had children under the age of 18 living with them, 48.3% were married couples living together, 7.6% had a female householder with no husband present, 4.2% had a male householder with no wife present, and 39.9% were non-families. 37.0% of all households were made up of individuals, and 18.6% had someone living alone who was 65 years of age or older. The average household size was 2.08 and the average family size was 2.67.

The median age in the city was 52.1 years. 17.6% of residents were under the age of 18; 5.1% were between the ages of 18 and 24; 17% were from 25 to 44; 32.7% were from 45 to 64; and 27.7% were 65 years of age or older. The gender makeup of the city was 47.5% male and 52.5% female.

=== 2000 census ===
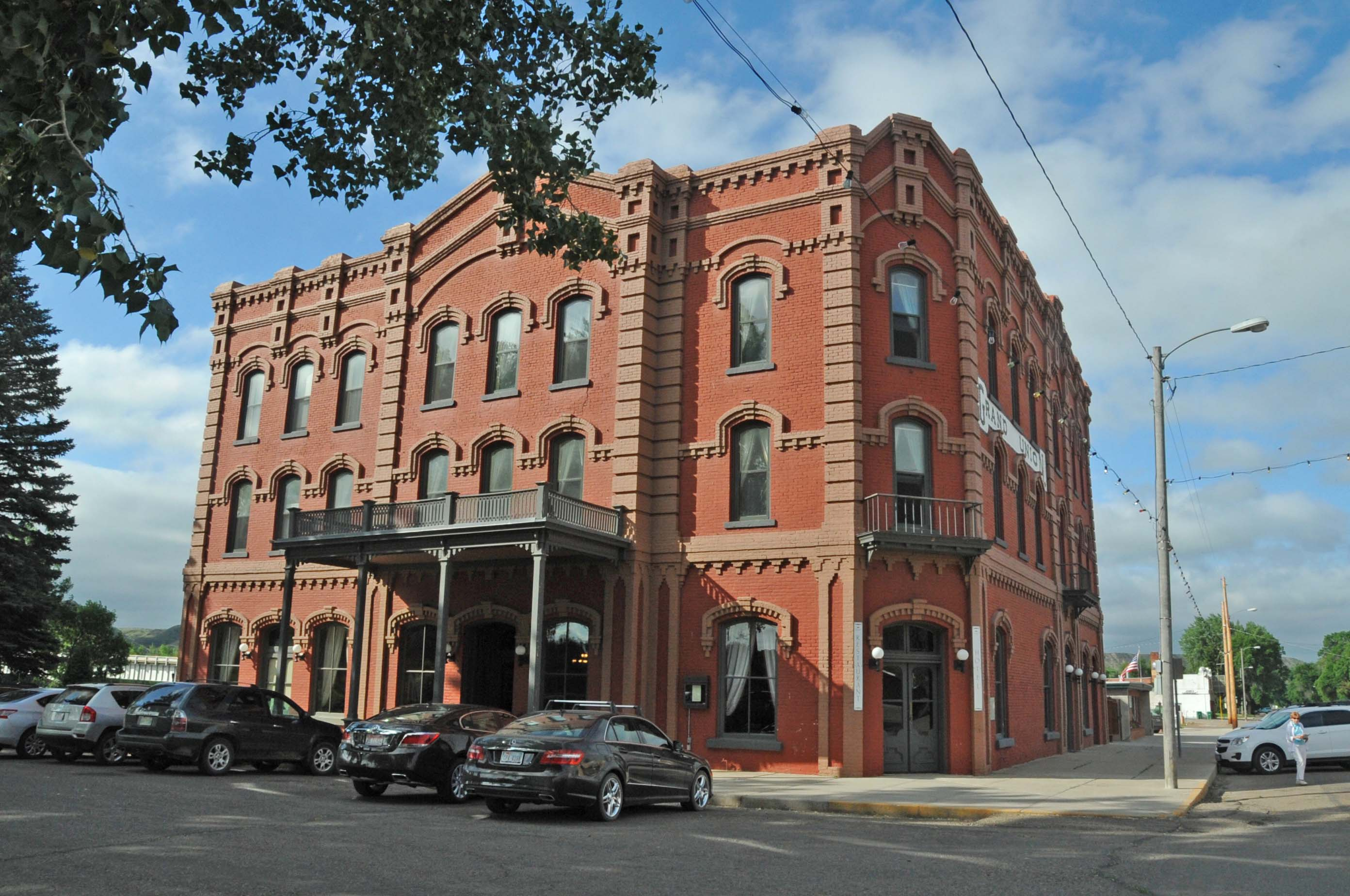
Grand Union Hotel

As of the census of 2000, there were 1,594 people, 636 households, and 422 families residing in the city. The population density was 763.2 inhabitants per square mile (294.7/km^{2}). There were 731 housing units at an average density of 350.0 per square mile (135.1/km^{2}). The racial makeup of the city was 97.68% White, 0.19% African American, 0.56% Native American, 0.38% Asian, 0.38% from other races, and 0.82% from two or more races. Hispanic or Latino of any race were 0.56% of the population.

There were 636 households, out of which 30.7% had children under the age of 18 living with them, 54.4% were married couples living together, 9.3% had a female householder with no husband present, and 33.5% were non-families. 31.0% of all households were made up of individuals, and 14.5% had someone living alone who was 65 years of age or older. The average household size was 2.34 and the average family size was 2.93.

In the city, the population was spread out, with 24.8% under the age of 18, 6.2% from 18 to 24, 23.1% from 25 to 44, 22.3% from 45 to 64, and 23.6% who were 65 years of age or older. The median age was 43 years. For every 100 females, there were 92.3 males. For every 100 females age 18 and over, there were 84.2 males.

The median income for a household in the city was $29,406, and the median income for a family was $32,072. Males had a median income of $22,813 versus $20,787 for females. The per capita income for the city was $14,861. About 11.6% of families and 13.4% of the population were below the poverty line, including 16.6% of those under age 18 and 6.7% of those age 65 or over.

== Government ==
Fort Benton has a mayor and city council. Roger J. Axtman won the election for mayor in November 2025. He replaced Lanny Walker who did not run for re-election.

== Education ==
Fort Benton Public School educates students from kindergarten through 12th grade. They are known as the Longhorns. Fort Benton High School is a Class C school for sports, but will be moving back up to Class B at the start of 2025 school year.

Chouteau County Library is headquartered in Fort Benton.

== Media ==
The local paper is The River Press. The newspaper is published weekly and has an e-edition.

Fort Benton is home to radio station KYPZ. It is a public radio satellite from KEMC in Billings.

== Infrastructure ==
Montana Highway 80 exits from U.S. Route 87 to enter Fort Benton. Montana secondary highway 386 enters from the west and 387 enters from the east.

Fort Benton Airport is a public-use airport located one mile northeast of town.

== Notable people ==
- Denise Curry, basketball player and coach
- Eleanor Dumont (1834–1879), also known as "Madame Moustache", professional card dealer and gambler
- Charles S. Hartman, United States Congressman
- William Henry Hunt, state and federal judge, and governor of Puerto Rico
- Daniel Webster Marsh, mayor of Calgary, Alberta
- Charles Nelson Pray, United States Congressman
- U.S. Grant Sharp, Jr., four-star admiral and Commander-in-Chief of the United States Pacific Fleet

== See also ==
- Shep, dog who famously waited for his deceased owner at the Fort Benton rail depot

== Sources ==
- Chittenden, Hiram Martin (1903). History of early steamboat navigation on the Missouri River : life and adventures of Joseph La Barge, Volume I . New York : Francis P. Harper.
- "The History of Old Fort Benton". Fort Benton Restoration Committee.
- "Welcome to Chouteau County, Montana". Chouteau County Courthouse.
