= WMJS-LP =

- Prince Frederick, Maryland; United States
- Broadcast area: Metro Prince Frederick
- Frequency: 102.1 MHz
- Branding: 102.1 WMJS

Programming
- Format: Full-service

Ownership
- Owner: St. Paul's Episcopal Church; (St. Paul's Parish/St. Paul's Episcopal Church)

History
- First air date: July 4, 2004
- Call sign meaning: former callsign of WDCJ

Technical information
- Licensing authority: FCC
- Facility ID: 123655
- Class: L1
- ERP: 82 watts
- HAAT: 33 meters (108 ft)
- Transmitter coordinates: 38°32′13.0″N 76°35′14.0″W

Links
- Public license information: LMS
- Webcast: Listen live (via TuneIn)

WMJS-LP is a Full Service formatted low-power broadcast radio station licensed to and serving Prince Frederick, Maryland. WMJS-LP is owned and operated by St. Paul's Episcopal Church.

== Programming/Call Sign ==
While WMJS-LP is licensed to an Episcopal parish, the programming on the station is principally secular, with Adult Contemporary, Classic Hits and Country music and community-oriented programming broadcast.

The station was assigned the WMJS-LP call letters by the Federal Communications Commission on December 29, 2003.
