= WKFF =

- Sardis, Mississippi; United States
- Frequency: 102.1 MHz
- Branding: K-Love

Programming
- Format: Contemporary Christian
- Affiliations: K-Love

Ownership
- Owner: Educational Media Foundation

History
- First air date: 2003 (as KBUD)
- Former call signs: KBUD (2001–2015)

Technical information
- Licensing authority: FCC
- Facility ID: 89397
- Class: A
- ERP: 4,000 watts
- HAAT: 123 meters
- Transmitter coordinates: 34°22′33″N 89°45′52″W

Links
- Public license information: Public file; LMS
- Webcast: Listen Live
- Website: klove.com

WKFF (102.1 FM, "K-Love") is a radio station broadcasting a contemporary Christian format. Licensed to Sardis, Mississippi, United States, the station is currently owned by Educational Media Foundation.
