= KJFM =

- Louisiana, Missouri; United States
- Broadcast area: Louisiana, Missouri; Bowling Green, Missouri; Pittsfield, Illinois
- Frequency: 102.1 MHz
- Branding: Eagle 102

Programming
- Format: Country music

Ownership
- Owner: Foxfire Communications, Inc.

Technical information
- Licensing authority: FCC
- Facility ID: 22218
- Class: A
- ERP: 3,700 watts
- HAAT: 118 meters (387 ft)
- Transmitter coordinates: 39°26′30″N 91°02′19″W

Links
- Public license information: Public file; LMS
- Website: kjfmradio.com

KJFM is a radio station airing a country music format licensed to Louisiana, Missouri, broadcasting on 102.1 FM. The station is owned by Foxfire Communications, Inc.
