= KUOL (Texas) =

Radio station in Texas, United States

Coordinates: 29°53′53″N 97°54′44″W

- San Marcos, Texas; United States
- Frequency: 1470 kHz

Programming
- Language: Spanish
- Format: Christian
- Affiliations: Radio Cristiana

Ownership
- Owner: SM Radio, Inc

History
- First air date: 1948
- Last air date: 2013
- Former call signs: KPSL (1948); KCNY (1948–2985); KSPL (1985–1993)

Technical information
- Facility ID: 60694
- Class: B
- Power: 250 watts

KUOL (1470 AM) was a radio station broadcasting a Spanish language Christian radio format. Licensed to San Marcos, Texas, United States, it simulcast Radio Cristiana.

== History ==
The station was first licensed, as KCNY, on August 6, 1948. The call letters were changed to KSPL on October 1, 1985, and to KUOL on February 3, 1993. Its license was cancelled by the Federal Communications Commission on November 12, 2013, and the KUOL call letters were deleted.
