= KFIM-LP =

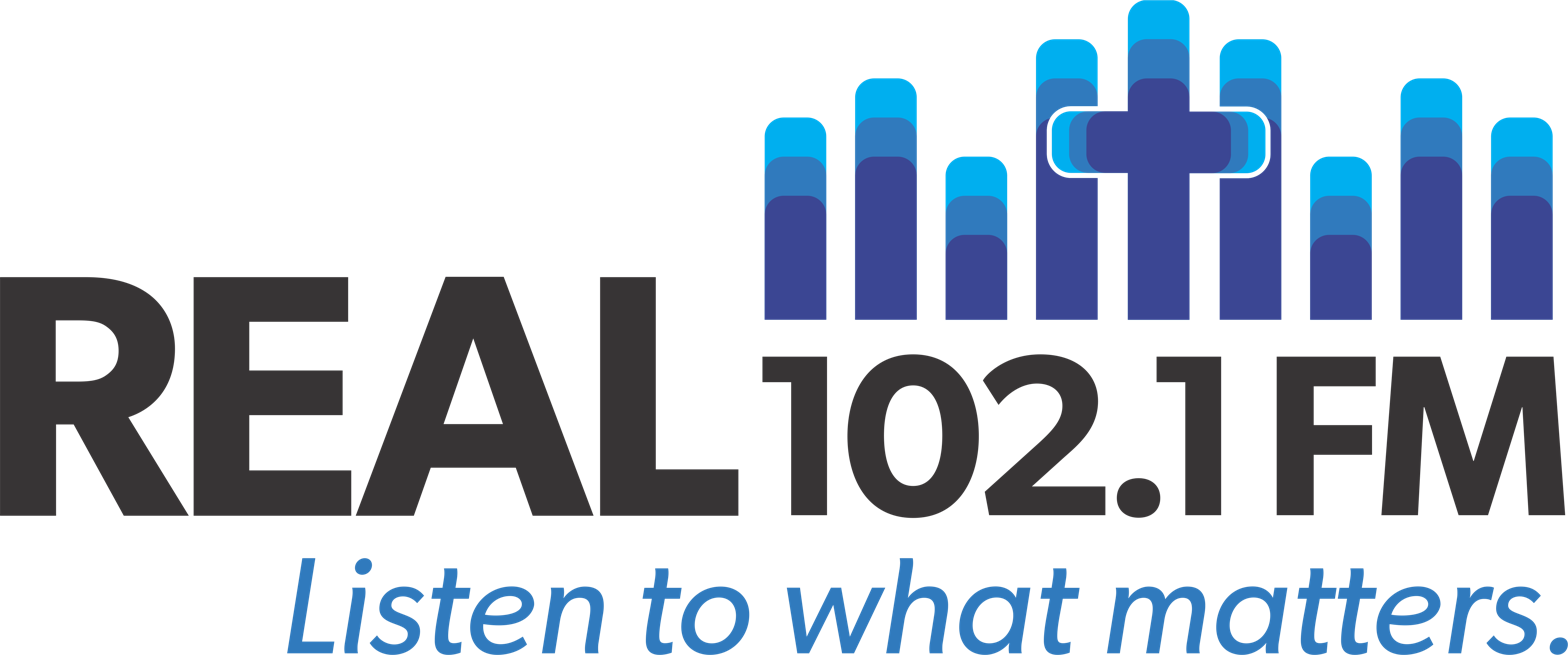
- Carroll, IA; United States
- Frequency: 102.1 Mhz
- Branding: REAL 102.1

Programming
- Format: CCM
- Affiliations: Salem Radio Network, The Storm Report Radio Network

Ownership
- Owner: Carroll Impact Educational Association
- Operator: Wes Treadway

History
- First air date: July 2015
- Call sign meaning: Keep (the) Family In Mind

Technical information
- Licensing authority: FCC
- Facility ID: 195194
- Class: LP
- Power: 100 Watts
- Transmitter coordinates: 42°02′57″N 94°53′04″W

Links
- Public license information: LMS
- Website: www.real102.com

KFIM-LP, known on the air as REAL 102.1, was a low-power FM Christian Music radio station located in Carroll, IA. The station was a music intensive format and carried the Today's Christian Music offering from the Salem Radio Network until it was purchased by EMF (Educational Media Foundation), the non-profit organization which operates KLOVE in early 2025. Throughout 2025, the radio station carried the ChristianFM radio format. REAL 102.1 also had local information such as the weather forecast and local events. The station was created by the Carroll Impact Educational Association, a non-profit 501(c)(3). KFIM-LP was first licensed on May 1, 2014, and went off the air on December 31, 2025.

== History ==
KFIM-LP first signed on the air in July 2015 and was created as a ministry and educational outreach of the idea to Carroll Impact Educational Association, a 501 (c)(3) non-profit organization. start KFIM-LP came about when Ron & Karla Cheney met a gentleman who notified them that the FCC was to open a filing window for low-power FM radio stations in late 2013. The couple then met with Wes Treadway, knowing that bringing Christian radio to Carroll, Iowa was a goal Wes had. The organization decided to cease operations on 12/31/25.

The following social media post announced the closure of the station:

"When we launched our 2025 campaign celebrating 10 years on the air in Carroll, we had no idea it would be our last. Honestly, I thought it would be just another milestone for this ministry. Fast forward 11 months, and we are now announcing that we will be going off the air at the end of 2025.

Radio has changed a lot over the past 12 years since Ron & Carla Cheney had a conversation with me in the back of church which ultimately launched this ministry. Our goal was to fill the gap of Christian radio that was missing in Carroll at the time. The Lord guided us through all that was needed to finally go on the air in July of 2015. He has continued to guide us through many concerts, network changes, equipment upgrades, signal issues, parades and other events and much, MUCH more.

Today, there are so many ways that the Lord is making His message available through music in the Carroll area. K-LOVE Radio (89.5 FM) is now available out of Fort Dodge, Life 107.1 has increased their signal so it is now available in Carroll. With streaming, we can listen to any radio station, or even song, we want, any time we want to.

While all of these things have definitely had an effect on the impact REAL 102.1 has been able to have, the point is not that WE reach people. but that people ARE being reached for Christ! So, while I am sad that something I have worked so hard on is coming to an end, I am excited to see Christian music more available to the Carroll area now than ever before.

"Thank you" seems like it is not enough but, thank you to our board of directors Ron Cheney, Marchelle Kots, Todd Tidgren, Marci Duncan and the late John McLaughlin. I appreciate your servants hearts. Thank you to my family who put up with dad being "at the station" so much the first few years. Thank you to the many donors and partners who have made this ministry possible. Thank you to the many volunteers who have helped us with engineering and technology as well as the volunteers who helped at the concerts over the years! I am eternally grateful for all of the prayer support from everyone through the years.

Finally, a radio station would be nothing without our listeners. While we know we do not have as many as we once did, we know many of you will be disappointed. With our app we know we even have loyal listeners in other countries which is crazy. But, thank you for your loyal listenership. For those who may want to hear the same personalities moving forward, you can catch them online at www.christianfm.com

The Lord has truly blessed us and we know He will continue to do so in the ministries he has ahead for us. God bless and THANK YOU! --Wes Treadway - General Manager"

== Staff ==
The station was governed by a board of directors which originally consisted of President-Ron Cheney, Treasurer-Marchelle Kots, John McLaughlin, Todd Tidgren and Jeff Grote. Jeff Grote was replaced in 2016 by Marci Duncan. Wes Treadway, former KCIM Program Director and Morning Announcer, served as the station's General Manager on a volunteer basis.
