= KSSI =

- China Lake, California; United States
- Broadcast area: Ridgecrest, California
- Frequency: 102.1 MHz
- Branding: I-Rock 102.1

Programming
- Format: Mainstream rock

Ownership
- Owner: Sound Enterprises

History
- First air date: 1995
- Former frequencies: 102.7 MHz (1995–2015)

Technical information
- Licensing authority: FCC
- Facility ID: 60883
- Class: B1
- ERP: 1,550 watts
- HAAT: 393 meters (1,289 ft)
- Transmitter coordinates: 35°28′39″N 117°41′58″W

Links
- Public license information: Public file; LMS
- Website: kssifm.com

KSSI (102.1 FM, "I-Rock") is a commercial radio station licensed to China Lake, California, United States, and serves the Ridgecrest area as well as the US-395 corridor in the High Desert region. The station is owned by Sound Enterprises and broadcasts a mainstream rock format.

== History ==
KSSI first signed on in 1995 on the 102.7 FM frequency with a classic rock format.

In 2015, KSSI moved from 102.7 FM to 102.1 FM.
