= WFAH-LP =

- Flint, Michigan; United States
- Frequency: 102.1 MHz

Programming
- Language: English
- Format: Variety

Ownership
- Owner: Greater Flint Arts Council

History
- Call sign meaning: Where Flint Arts Happen

Technical information
- Licensing authority: FCC
- Facility ID: 196822
- Class: L1
- ERP: 60 watts
- HAAT: 39.4 metres (129 ft)
- Transmitter coordinates: 43°04′40″N 83°42′56″W

Links
- Public license information: LMS
- Website: greaterflintartscouncil.org/WFAH

WFAH-LP (102.1 FM) is a low power radio station in Flint, Michigan with a variety format licensed to the Greater Flint Arts Council. Its 60 watt, 39.4 metres (129 ft) transmitter is near the intersection of West Carpenter Road and Martin Luther King Avenue in Flint's northwest side.
