= CFSI-FM =

Former radio station on Saltspring Island, British Columbia

Coordinates: 48°50′56″N 123°31′52″W

- Saltspring Island, British Columbia; Canada
- Frequency: 107.9 MHz
- Branding: Saltspring Island Radio

Programming
- Format: commercial radio

Ownership
- Owner: Satnam Radio Group

History
- First air date: September 14, 2009
- Last air date: July 25, 2015
- Call sign meaning: Saltspring Island

Technical information
- Class: A
- ERP: 130 watts average 700 watts peak horizontal polarization only
- HAAT: 215.6 metres

CFSI-FM was a Canadian radio station that began broadcasting on September 14, 2009. Broadcasting on 107.9 FM, it was the first radio station licensed to Salt Spring Island in British Columbia.

The station was licensed by the Canadian Radio-television and Telecommunications Commission (CRTC) on October 22, 2007. It offered a community-oriented programming format, including a variety of different musical styles: independent artists, blues, classical, jazz, world music. Programming also included local interest talk shows and spiritual shows. Richard Moses, a former programmer with CKUA in Edmonton and CJRT in Toronto, was one of the contributing programmers.

The station began testing on June 15, 2009 and officially began broadcasting in September 2009.

On September 23, 2011, Salt Spring Island Radio Corp. received CRTC approval to operate a new FM transmitter at 102.1 MHz in Mount Bruce with the call sign CFSI-FM-1.

In 2013, CFSI-FM was rebranded as Green FM.

The station was sold in mid-February 2013 to South Asian broadcaster Satnam Media Group; Satnam announced it intended to maintain the existing format on CFSI. However, after several non-compliances in a CRTC audit, as well as alleged missing voluntary audits, including faulty program logs, as well as missing annual returns and several years of unpaid fees, a number of former CFSI staff/volunteers intervened with the CRTC asking for license revocation due to the poor management of Satnam Media. After a hearing in May 2015, the CRTC revoked CFSI's radio license on June 25, 2015, and CFSI went off the air on July 25, 2015.

== Notes ==
On November 28, 2019, Gulf Islands Community Radio Society submitted an application to operate a new community FM radio station at Salt Spring Island. The new station would operate on CFSI-FM's former frequencies 107.9 MHz with a rebroadcasting transmitter at 102.1 MHz. Gulf Islands received CRTC approval to operate an English-language community FM radio station as well as a rebroadcasting transmitter on Salt Spring Island on January 24, 2022.

The station was launched in the spring of 2022 as CHIR-FM Gulf Islands Radio at 107.9 FM Salt Spring Island and VF5176 at 102.1 FM Mount Bruce.
