= KHKC-FM =

- Atoka, Oklahoma; United States
- Frequency: 102.1 MHz
- Branding: KHKC 102.1 FM

Programming
- Format: Country music

Ownership
- Owner: Keystone Broadcasting Corporation

Technical information
- Licensing authority: FCC
- Facility ID: 3652
- Class: A
- ERP: 750 watts
- HAAT: 137 meters (449 ft)
- Transmitter coordinates: 34.418889°N 96.19000°W

Links
- Public license information: Public file; LMS
- Website: khkc1021.com

KHKC-FM 102.1 FM is a radio station licensed to Atoka, Oklahoma. The station broadcasts a country music format and is owned by Keystone Broadcasting Corporation.

The station building in Atoka housing both KHKC-FM and KZIG-FM was destroyed by a tornado on May 9, 2016. A new building in another location housing both stations reopened exactly one year later.
