= WJCA =

Radio station in Albion, New York

Coordinates: 43.188667°N 78.147806°W

- Albion, New York; United States
- Broadcast area: Rochester metropolitan area Batavia, New York
- Frequency: 102.1 MHz
- Branding: SonLife Radio

Programming
- Format: Christian Radio
- Affiliations: SonLife Broadcasting Network

Ownership
- Owner: Family Worship Center Church, Inc.

History
- First air date: December 27, 2001

Technical information
- Licensing authority: FCC
- Facility ID: 86922
- Class: A
- ERP: 3,700 watts
- HAAT: 129 meters (423 ft)

Links
- Public license information: Public file; LMS
- Webcast: Listen Live
- Website: https://sonlifetv.com/

WJCA (102.1 MHz) is a Christian radio station licensed to Albion, New York, and owned by Family Worship Center Church, Inc. The station began broadcasting on December 27, 2001, airing a Christian format as an owned and operated affiliate of CSN International. In 2005, the station was sold to Family Worship Center Church for $950,000.
