= KYPZ =

Yellowstone Public Radio station in Fort Benton, Montana

- Fort Benton, Montana; United States
- Broadcast area: Great Falls, Montana
- Frequency: 96.1 MHz (HD Radio)
- Branding: Yellowstone Public Radio

Programming
- Format: Public radio

Ownership
- Owner: Montana State University Billings

History
- First air date: 2009 (as KJCD at 95.9)
- Former call signs: KJCD (2008–2013); KVMO (2013–2017)
- Former frequencies: 95.9 MHz (2008–2014); 96.3 MHz (2014–2017)
- Call sign meaning: K Yellowstone Public Radio Z

Technical information
- Licensing authority: FCC
- Facility ID: 164087
- Class: C1
- ERP: 100 watts
- HAAT: −1 meter (−3.3 ft)
- Transmitter coordinates: 47°50′8″N 110°39′10″W

Links
- Public license information: Public file; LMS

KYPZ (96.1 FM) is a public radio station licensed to Fort Benton, Montana, USA. It is owned by Montana State University Billings as part of its Yellowstone Public Radio network. It was previously owned by Montana Radio Company as a commercial classic country station, but was divested as part of a multi-station transaction with Cherry Creek Radio.

== History ==
The Federal Communications Commission issued a construction permit for the station to Advance Acquisition, Inc. on June 8, 2005. The station was assigned the KJCD call sign on June 5, 2008, and was granted its license to cover on July 2, 2008. Just prior to the license being issued, Advance assigned the station's construction permit to Sovereign City Radio Services, LLC at a purchase price of $1,447,462. Included in the purchase were additional construction permits for stations in Socorro, New Mexico (now KYRN), Duluth, Minnesota (not yet licensed at 750 AM), Lake City, Florida (not yet licensed at 1450 AM), Bemidji, Minnesota (not yet licensed at 1400 AM), Ironwood, Michigan (permit since cancelled), and Houghton, Michigan (permit since cancelled). On October 31, 2008, Sovereign assigned the license to Montana Christian Radio Association by way of a donation valued at $500,000.

Montana Christian Radio sold KJCD to Kevin Terry's The Montana Radio Company, LLC for $20,000; the transaction was consummated on August 5, 2013.

The station changed its call sign to KVMO on September 17, 2013.

On November 9, 2014, KVMO changed its format to classic country, branded as Mo Legends 96.3, a spin-off from KIMO.

In April 2017, it was reported that KVMO would be divested to Yellowstone Public Radio as part of a larger transaction with Cherry Creek Media (who would acquire KVMO's translator K280GG). The sale was completed on July 28, 2017.

On September 19, 2017, KVMO changed its call letters to KYPZ.
