= KEMC =

- Billings, Montana; United States
- Broadcast area: Billings Metropolitan Area
- Frequency: 91.7 MHz (HD Radio)

Programming
- Format: Public radio

Ownership
- Owner: Montana State University-Billings

History
- First air date: 1973
- Call sign meaning: Eastern Montana College (former name of MSU-Billings)

Technical information
- Licensing authority: FCC
- Facility ID: 43571
- Class: C1
- ERP: 100,000 watts
- HAAT: 158 meters (518 ft)
- Transmitter coordinates: 45°39′31″N 108°34′14″W
- Translator: 98.9 K255CW (Billings)

Links
- Public license information: Public file; LMS
- Webcast: Listen live
- Website: www.ypradio.org

KEMC (91.7 FM) is an American NPR-member public radio station in Billings, Montana. Broadcasting from the campus of Montana State University-Billings, it is the flagship station of Yellowstone Public Radio.
