= KSMT =

- Breckenridge, Colorado; United States
- Frequency: 102.1 MHz
- Branding: The Mountain

Programming
- Format: adult album alternative

Ownership
- Owner: Patricia MacDonald Garber and Peter Benedetti; (AlwaysMountainTime, LLC)

History
- Former call signs: KLGT (1975–1984)

Technical information
- Licensing authority: FCC
- Facility ID: 57336
- Class: A
- ERP: 6,000 watts
- HAAT: −64.0 meters (−210.0 ft)
- Transmitter coordinates: 39°29′44″N 106°1′44″W
- Translator: K274AG (102.7 FM) Dillon

Links
- Public license information: Public file; LMS
- Webcast: Listen Live
- Website: Official website

KSMT (102.1 FM, The Mountain) is a radio station broadcasting an adult album alternative music format. Licensed to Breckenridge, Colorado, United States, the station is currently owned by Patricia MacDonald Garber and Peter Benedetti, through licensee AlwaysMountainTime, LLC.
