= CKXR-FM =

Radio station in Salmon Arm, British Columbia

- Salmon Arm, British Columbia; Canada
- Broadcast area: Shuswap Country
- Frequency: 91.5 MHz
- Branding: 91.5 Summit

Programming
- Format: Classic hits

Ownership
- Owner: Vista Radio

History
- First air date: November 18, 1965

Technical information
- Class: B
- ERP: 400 watts (average); 810 watts (peak) (horizontal only)
- HAAT: 741 metres (2,431 ft)
- Transmitter coordinates: 50.7586°N 119.366°W
- Repeaters: CKXR-FM-1 102.1 Sorrento; CKXR-FM-2 104.3 Enderby; CKXR-FM-3 102.1 Sicamous

Links
- Webcast: https://radioplayer.vistaradio.ca/ckxr

CKXR-FM is a Canadian radio station in Salmon Arm, British Columbia. The station is owned by Vista Radio and airs a classic hits format under the on-air brand 91.5 Summit.

== History ==
CKXR first signed on the air on November 18, 1965 on its original frequency of 580 AM, under original owners Hall-Gray Broadcasting Company Ltd. Three days later, CKXR put its Revelstoke rebroadcaster CKCR on the air at 1340 AM. CKXR and CKCR became the founding stations of a regional radio system called the Big R Network shortly after the stations' establishment.

On July 21, 1972, CKXR increased its transmission power to 10,000 watts in the daytime and 1000 watts at night. On May 16, 1974, CKCR Revelstoke was upgraded from a rebroadcaster of CKXR to a semi-satellite when CKCR began originating programming from its own studio, in addition to receiving the balance of its programs from CKXR. That same year CKCR set up a rebroadcaster of its own when CKGR in Golden began operations at 1400 AM. On December 31, 1984, CKGR also began originating some programming, and CKIR in Invermere began rebroadcasting CKGR at 870 AM.

In 1999, the CRTC approved the purchase of CKXR and its rebroadcasters by Okanagan Skeena Group Ltd., which was subsequently purchased by Telemedia. With the Telemedia purchase, CKXR received the EZ Rock branding shortly afterward. Telemedia's broadcasting assets (including CKXR) were purchased by Standard Broadcasting (through its Standard Radio division) in 2002. On June 5, 2006, CKXR received approval to move to the FM band at its current frequency; it was originally to simulcast programming with its old 580 AM frequency for three months, but the simulcast period was extended to February 27, 2008, due to the new FM signal not reaching the communities of Enderby and Sicamous, to allow CKXR to set up rebroadcast transmitters in those communities (104.3 FM with 210 watts in Enderby, 102.1 FM with 200 watts in Sicamous).

In October 2007, the assets of Standard Radio (including CKXR) were purchased by Astral Media. Astral's assets were acquired by the station's current owner, Bell Media, in September 2013.

CKCR in Revelstoke applied to convert to FM which received approval on March 3, 2009. CKCR now broadcasts on 106.1 MHz with 800 watts.

On October 15, 2010, CKGR received approval to move from the AM band to the FM band on the frequency of 106.3 MHz.

On May 18, 2021, CKXR, along with all remaining EZ Rock-branded stations, dropped the brand in favor of the new Bounce brand, with a switch to Bounce's adult hits format.

On February 8, 2024, Bell Media announced a restructuring that included the sale of 45 of its 103 radio stations to seven buyers, subject to approval by the CRTC, including CKXR, which was sold to Vista Radio. The application was approved on February 13, 2025.

The sale took effect April 14, 2025 and Vista rebranded the station to Classic Hits as 91.5 Summit.

== Rebroadcasters ==
Rebroadcasters of CKXR-FM
City of licence	Identifier	Frequency	Power	Class	RECNet	CRTC Decision
Sorrento	CKXR-FM-1	102.1	(Horizontal only); 86 watts	A1	Query	2007-378
Enderby	CKXR-FM-2	104.3	(Horizontal only); 200 watts	A1	Query	
Sicamous	CKXR-FM-3	102.1	(Horizontal only); 200 watts	A1	Query	
