= XHJK-FM =

Radio station in Ciudad Delicias, Chihuahua

- Delicias, Chihuahua; Mexico
- Frequency: 102.1 FM
- Branding: Romántica

Programming
- Format: Romantic

Ownership
- Owner: Sigma Radio; (Alejandro and José Antonio Chavero Sousa)

History
- First air date: June 1, 1949 (concession)

Technical information
- Licensing authority: CRT
- Class: B1
- ERP: 25 kW
- HAAT: 35.2 m (115 ft)
- Transmitter coordinates: 28°11′21″N 105°26′56″W

Links
- Webcast: Listen live
- Website: sigmaradiodelicias.com

XHJK-FM is a radio station on 102.1 FM in Delicias, Chihuahua. The station is owned by Sigma Radio and carries a romantic music format.

== History ==
XHJK began as XEJK-AM on June 1, 1949. It broadcast on 1340 kHz and was owned by La Voz de Delicias, S.A. By the 1990s, it was owned by Grupo ACIR; it moved down to 980 kHz at the same time.

XEJK migrated to FM in 2011.
