= KILX =

Radio station in De Queen, Arkansas

- De Queen, Arkansas; United States
- Frequency: 102.1 MHz

Programming
- Format: Country

Ownership
- Owner: Jay and Teresa Bunyard; (Bunyard Broadcasting, Inc.)

History
- Former call signs: KENA-FM (1970–1974); KSKR (1974–1981); KUOL (1981–1988); KENA-FM (1988–2014)
- Former frequencies: 101.7 MHz (1970–1984)

Technical information
- Licensing authority: FCC
- Facility ID: 50772
- Class: A
- ERP: 6,000 watts
- HAAT: 143.0 meters (469.2 ft)
- Transmitter coordinates: 34°06′21″N 94°20′56″W

Links
- Public license information: Public file; LMS

KILX (102.1 FM) is a radio station broadcasting a Country music format. Licensed to serve De Queen, Arkansas, United States, the station is currently owned by Jay and Teresa Bunyard, through licensee Bunyard Broadcasting, Inc.
