= KYRN =

Radio station in Socorro, New Mexico

KNMQ
- Socorro, New Mexico; United States
- Frequency: 102.1 MHz

Programming
- Format: Classic hits
- Affiliations: Accuweather; Salem Radio Network; Westwood One

Ownership
- Owner: Socorro Community Radio

History
- First air date: 2022 (as KYRN)
- Former call signs: KYRN (2022-2025)

Technical information
- Licensing authority: FCC
- Facility ID: 164088
- Class: A
- ERP: 100 watts
- HAAT: 571 meters (1,873 ft)
- Transmitter coordinates: 34°4′17.8″N 106°57′44.3″W

Links
- Public license information: Public file; LMS
- Webcast: Listen Live

KNMQ (102.1 FM) is a radio station licensed to Socorro, New Mexico. KYRN is owned and operated by Socorro Community Radio. The format of the station is classic hits that broadcasts local and national news, weather, and Socorro High School sports, as well as Spanish music on weekends.

The station has a two-hour live morning program, Sunrise Socorro, hosted by Steve Edmondson that includes sports commentary.

== History ==
In 2022, Socorro Community Radio successfully renewed its license despite an informal objection filed by Green Lion Media.

On April 1, 2025, KYRN dropped its classic country format and began stunting with Christmas music as "Santa 102.1". On April 3, 2025 after two days of stunting, KYRN launched a classic hits format under new KNMQ call letters.
