= WKOT-LP =

Radio station in Wimauma, Florida, United States

- Wimauma, Florida; United States
- Frequency: 102.1 MHz
- Branding: New Beginning Radio

Programming
- Format: Religious

Ownership
- Owner: New Beginning Baptist Temple

Technical information
- Licensing authority: FCC
- Facility ID: 194803
- Class: L1
- ERP: 26 watts
- HAAT: 57 metres (187 ft)
- Transmitter coordinates: 27°45′51″N 82°15′26″W

Links
- Public license information: LMS

WKOT-LP (102.1 FM) is a radio station licensed to serve the community of Wimauma, Florida. The station is owned by New Beginning Baptist Temple. It airs a religious format.

The station was assigned the WKOT-LP call letters by the Federal Communications Commission on April 5, 2014.
