= 2018 in radio =

The following is a list of events affecting radio broadcasting in 2018. Events listed include radio program debuts, finales, cancellations, and station launches, closures and format changes, as well as information about controversies.

== Notable events ==
=== January ===
Date	Event
1	Business Talk station W280EV, formerly a simulcast of WSDV Sarasota, Florida, ends its two months stunting with Christmas music with a flip to Top 40/CHR as "103.9 Kiss FM."
1	Rocky Mount/Wilson, North Carolina picked up a Rhythmic Adult Top 40, as former Classic Rock WZAX returns from Christmas music to launch "Movin’ 99.3," thus marking a return to a Rhythmic-type direction since 2014 when it was Gold-based "Jammin’ 99.3."
1	WBKW in Beckley, West Virginia dumps Gospel for Alternative rock as "93.5 The Buzz."
1	In Oklahoma City, "Fun" gives way to "Alice" as KQOB goes back to Variety hits.
3	Another country station debuts in Ohio as W295CI Bellefontaine/Urbana, formerly a simulcast of talk station WBLL, becomes "106.9 The Bull".
5	Entercom entered a deal to bring the Dance/Electronic webcast Pulse 87 to the Los Angeles airwaves as a HD2 subchannel of Top 40/CHR KAMP-FM, billing it as "Pulse 97.1 HD2." The move marks the first time since October 2016 when it was broadcast over the air on KYLI Las Vegas.
5	After nearly three months of being "Hot", Flinn Broadcasting's WJXN-FM Jackson, Mississippi was rebranded as "G100.9", this time under a LMA deal with Alpha Media, who in turn replaced the Westwood One programming with Alpha's in-house presentation, thus putting it in line with Alpha's "G" branded stations.
8	The Federal Communications Commission begins the elimination on this date of the Main Studio Rule; the long-standing rule required radio and television stations to maintain a physical studio 25 miles within its city of license, have it staffed during normal business hours, and have capabilities for program origination.
8	KTUX Shreveport, Louisiana flips to classic rock taking new competitor KTAL-FM's morning show and changing to Highway 98.9. KBAT in Midland also joins Townsquare's Ultimate classic rock fray however they will themselves as The new sound of KBAT 99.9.
9	Alpha Media's WRXQ Joliet, Illinois terminates overnight personality "Crazy Ray" Odom after he made an appearance on the CNBC reality show The Profit, where he and his partner sought help from Profit star Marcus Lemonis to turn around their outdoor apparel shop focusing on activewear for fishermen, but his position at WRXQ where he said he "played a sexist, egotistical, racist pig on the radio" was used for dramatic effect and tied into why Lemonis did not invest in their company. The conflict of interest, followed by a statement from WRXQ that claimed 'the views he expressed in the program were' his only and not those of Alpha and WRXQ, were given as explanations for Odom's dismissal.
19	Cumulus Media announces that will seek permission from the United States Bankruptcy Court to cancel its LMA and purchase deal for Chicago's WLUP-FM and WKQX from current owner Merlin Media after it made a deal to acquire the Rock outlets in 2014, citing losses from revenues tied to the stations, as well as canceling or ending its contracts to carry play by play broadcasts of Buffalo Bills (a team they stopped carrying in 2012 but never paid off the contract), Chicago Bulls and White Sox, and Seattle Seahawks, radio distribution of CNBC, a series of leases for buildings and towers, and ending a talent agreement with American Patriot LLC, who handles the deal for Mancow Muller. If approved, the deals could be nullified but at the same time could affect the future of the aforementioned sports teams. On January 31, WSCR picked up the PBP rights of the Bulls’ broadcasts from WLS (abruptly ending a five-year deal as they were in the middle of a first year run), effective with the February 3 broadcast against the Los Angeles Clippers; the new multiyear deal also retains the current lineup of announcers Chuck Swirsky, Bill Wennington, and pre/post/halftime show host Steve Kashul. On February 14, WGN became the new home for the White Sox PBP broadcasts, thus marking a return to the Tribune-owned station that carried the American League franchise from 1927 to 1943, and brings the station back to carrying baseball broadcasts since losing the Cubs (which was formerly owned by Tribune) in 2014 to WBBM.
25	Just nearly three years after it acquired Journal Communications, E.W. Scripps Company announces that it will put the 34 radio stations that it added to its portfolio up for sale as part of a restructuring plan.
29	In a controversial move, which comes after losing a court case to Taylor Swift in 2017 over allegations that resulted from touching her inappropriately during a meet and greet during her concert stop in Denver that resulted in losing his job at KYGO-FM in 2013, David Mueller lands a morning gig at WMYQ (FM) Greenwood, Mississippi under the name "Stonewall Jackson." The news of his hiring by owner Larry Fuss (who is also co-partner with Mueller in smaller radio outlets) is sparking attention because of his sexual assault incidents and has sparked criticism from the radio industry and Swift fans, who plan to lead a campaign to have Mueller fired and exile from radio for good.
29	CKRI-FM Red Deer, Alberta dumps its classic hits format and flips to an alternative rock format as it rebrands to "X100.7".
30	Boise-based Impact Radio Group expands their portfolio of stations to Twin Falls, as they take over the operations of six stations (Top 40/CHR KTPZ. Country KZUN, Variety Hits KIKX, AC KIRQ, and translators/HD subchannels Soft AC K236BS/KYUN-HD3 and Alternative K286CH/KYUN-HD2) owned by Locally Owned Radio LLC after the announced retirement of operators Larry and Stephanie Johnson. The two companies will also rename itself Iliad Media Group with the expanded roster.
30	Emmis Communications exits the St. Louis market, with the sale of Classic Rock KSHE and Alternative KPNT to Hubbard Broadcasting, and Top 40/CHR KNOU and News/Talk KFTK-FM to Entercom.
30	After a three-month hiatus from broadcasting, Delilah returns to radio and gets a new flagship station at Seattle's KSWD. Additionally, she adds a secondary local mid-morning program on KSWD, specific to Seattle.

=== February ===
Date	Event
2	WZON Bangor, Maine drops Progressive Talk for Oldies.
2	After a nearly four-year run with Active Rock, KZND-FM Anchorage reverted to its prior alternative rock format, as "94.7 KZND – Alaska's Rock Alternative".
2	KQV Pittsburgh, Pennsylvania will remain on the air after Robert and Ashley Stevens, owners of several other assorted stations in the area, agree to purchase the station's license and non-tower assets with intent to use their existing tower to return the station to the air before the start of 2019. The station had been silent since December 2017 after a series of deaths in the families that had owned and operated the all-news radio format, which the Stevenses have indicated they wish to retain for as long as it is feasible.
6	The FCC announces that they are looking at creating a Class C4 FM table, which would allow stations (roughly around 800 FM stations in Zone II) the potential to upgrade from Class A, but not all the way to C3. The original proposal, which was first introduced in 2013, sought to allow stations to increase its power to the equivalent of 12 kW from a reference antenna height of 100 meters above average terrain whereas Class A is 6 kW/100m and C3 is 25 kW/100m.
6	NPR confirms that longtime investigative reporter Daniel Zwerdling left the network in January, a departure that came amid a reported investigation into sexual harassment allegations against Zwerdling, incidents he denies took place.
6	The Canadian Broadcasting Corporation announces the rebranding of CBC Radio 2, its national music network, as CBC Music.
6–7	Five Spanish Adult Contemporary radio stations owned by Univision have changed their brands from "Mas Variedad" to "Amor". The stations are KBRG (San Jose/San Francisco), KLQV (San Diego), KOVE-FM (Galveston/Houston), KOMR (Sun City/Phoenix), and KLJA (Georgetown/Austin). The five stations now join KRDA (Clovis/Fresno), WPPN (Des Plaines/Chicago), and WAMR-FM (Miami) who are currently utilizing the brand name.
8	WTAQ Green Bay mid-morning host Jerry Bader's contract is ended and he departs that station; the show was additionally simulcast on WHBL Sheboygan (where he was a former long-time news director) and WSAU Wausau. Bader claims that his "never Trump" political stance had caused friction with station management.
9	Maritime Broadcasting System fired all on-air staff at three radio stations in Saint John, New Brunswick.
12	Chris Lash announces plans to purchase WSPQ Springville/Buffalo, New York and return it to air after its previous owner shut the station down in December 2017 for lack of funds. Three months later, Lash backed out of the agreement after he discovered the transmitter site had been looted of its equipment, rendering the station inoperable. The station's current owners have until December 31 to find another owner who can return it to air before its license is canceled.
14	Alpha Media exits the Richmond market on this date, as it transfers the ownership of Classic Hits WBBT-FM and Classic Country WWLB to Commonwealth Public Broadcasting Corporation. Commonwealth's flagship station WCVE-FM will move their music programming to the frequencies upon closure of the sale.
14	KNBR San Francisco fires host Patrick Connor after he appeared on a February 13 broadcast of Barstool Sports' "Dialed-In with Dallas Braden" in which he made inappropriate comments towards Olympic Gold Medalist Chloe Kim, making a crude compliment to the 17-year–old's looks, only to have the comments go viral after Deadspin reposted the audio on its website. Connor later apologized afterwards and took full blame for the remarks.
16	Entercom's Top 40/CHR KEGY San Diego released the entire air staff, including its morning hosts Sean Locke and Tonya Gonzalez, and moved midday host Alexia to Alternative sister KBZT, which comes just 2 months after moving from its former home at 103.7 to the current 97.3 signal and a drop in the Nielsen Audio ratings. On March 2, after two weeks of running jockless followed by a brief stunting with Rock music, KEGY flipped to a hybrid Talk/Classic Rock format as "97.3 The Machine," featuring a lineup that includes ex-XEPRS-AM morning host Dan Sileo in middays, and simulcasts in mornings from KITS San Francisco's Kevin Kline and afternoons from KISW Seattle's "The Men's Room." On February 19 the San Diego Padres announced that KEGY will serve as the official home for the National League West franchise (with expanded surrounding programming) after spending the previous year at KBZT. However, Padres owner Ron Fowler is looking at opting out of the deal after Kline made a series of tweets photos featuring places in San Diego where they contributed to the number of jumps to suicides deaths with the word "JUMP*" next to the location as pointed by the asterisk (in particular Point Loma and the Coronado Bridge) but was using it as promo for the show that he later apologized for, as well as their objection to Sileo on the station's lineup, a move that resulted in the cancellation of a sponsored event ahead of the Padres’ home opener against the visiting Milwaukee Brewers at Petco Park on March 29. On April 12, KEGY dropped the Hybrid Rock/Talk format and "The Machine" branding in favor of Sports Talk and the new branding "97.3 The Fan."
16	The "K" branding makes its return to CKRV-FM, in Kamloops, British Columbia after 25 years as the station rebrands to K97.5 with a classic hits format focusing heavily on 70s 80s and 90s music.
19	WMGK Philadelphia morning host John DeBella, along with employer and WMGK owner Beasley Broadcasting and TTWN and its parent company iHeart Media, are named as defendants in a sexual harassment lawsuit against the parties by Jennifer Neill, who under the on-air name "Jen Posner", was an employee of TTWN Media as a traffic reporter from 2000 to 2017. She started reporting traffic for DeBella's show when he joined WMGK in 2002 and was promoted to co-host in 2010 where her TTWN employment was subcontracted to then WMGK owner Greater Media. According to the lawsuit, Neill claimed that DeBella forced himself on her at work repeatedly, made unwanted advances, and asked for sexual favors, while station management did nothing. She later filed a complaint with the Pennsylvania Human Relations Commission in September 2016 after which she was asked to return to work or take a leave of absence while an independent investigation was conducted (Neill did return for one show and left), but six weeks later after the investigation was completed she was never told of the details and was given the opportunity to return or resign, the latter of which she did in January 2017 after she was demoted to traffic reporter at TTWN. The lawsuit resulted in a settlement between the principal parties on July 13.
19	CKTO-FM Truro, Nova Scotia flips from Hot AC/classic rock to active rock.
24	After a five-year run with All-80s Music, WMGA Kenova/Huntington, West Virginia flips to AC, marking a return to the format, as it previously had an Adult Top 40 direction prior to the 2012 flip.
26	Just six months after relocating from 101.3 to a new home upon its transfer of ownership from Univision to American General Media, the Albuquerque-Santa Fe Regional Mexican trimulcasts of KJFA/KJFA-FM & K275AO flipped to Spanish Top 40/CHR as "Exitos 102.9." The move was done to help serve as a flanker for KLVO and to reduce the overlapping of two Regional Mexican outlets, thus giving KLVO exclusivity to the latter.

=== March ===
Date	Event
1	Kemp Communications makes changes at its Las Vegas flagship properties, as it announces plans to flip sports talk KMZQ to conservative talk, utilizing programming from Salem Media (they also join a crowded market with three competitors in the same format), and rebrands as Kemp Broadcasting and Digital Media to reflect the company's expansion into outdoor advertising.
1	Format changes took place for two Niagara radio stations in the Niagara region of Ontario as CFLZ-FM flips to "101.1 More FM" with 70s, 80s, 90s classic hits while CJED-FM returns to its previous brand "105.1 The River" with Hot AC.
2	Cumulus Media announced that its Harrisburg outlets, Top 40/CHR WWKL and Nash FM-formatted County WZCY-FM, will trade places effective March 15. The move will give WWKL a more powerful signal and expanded coverage at the Hershey-licensed 106.7 frequency, while at the same time alleviate an overlapping issue between WZCY-FM (who'll occupy the Mechanicsburg-assigned 93.5 position) and sister WIOV-FM, the latter serving the Lancaster, York, and Reading metropolitan areas. The frequency switch will also become the third time that it has occurred in WWKL's 13 years in the format, having spent its first six (2005–2011 during its tenure as a Rhythmic) at 92.1, and the last eight (2011–2018 in its current direction) at 93.5.
2	iHeartMedia makes format changes in Spokane. KIIX-FM's country format moves over to KZFS & K257FX, and rebrand as "Kix 99.3," thus replacing the contemporary Christian format after six years. The 96.1 frequency relaunches under the "ALT 96.1" moniker as alternative KFOO-FM on March 5. This flip to the latter marks the first time Spokane had an alternative outlet in eight years since KZBD flipped to top 40 as it faces a crowded rock battle that includes active rock KHTQ and adult album alternative KPND. The contemporary Christian format previously on KZFS was moved to the HD2 channel of KKZX 98.9.
5	After the conversion to a purchase by Cumulus Media from its existing local marketing agreement fell through in the Cumulus bankruptcy, Merlin Media will instead sell WLUP-FM Chicago to the Educational Media Foundation for $21.5 million, which will convert station to a non–commercial operation. It ends that station's over 60 years as a commercial station, and forty years as a heritage mainstream rock station. It would be the second full-power station EMF owns in the Chicago market (EMF also owns several smaller stations and translators in the market). It is not known as to whether K-Love or Air1 will be carried, and what new sister station WJKL in Glendale Heights will carry.
7	The first of several changes in the Cattaraugus County, New York radio landscape takes place: One day before its license was set to be forfeited, WGGO Salamanca returns to the airwaves, airing an automated loop of 1970s pop songs. The station had been off the air since March 2017 after its tower had collapsed.; On March 9, WVTT Portville flips from adult top 40 to recurrent country as "Eagle Country Throwbacks," adopting a brand extension of sister station WAGL, a hot country station.; On March 19, WOEN Olean ends its Salem talk format and begins simulcasting sister station WZKZ and its country format. WOEN was the last commercial talk radio station (of any form) in the Olean/Bradford media market.
8	After a nine-month run with Top 40/CHR, KOUL & K277BL Corpus Christi flipped to Variety Hits as "Shuffle 103.3." The flip puts the rimshot/translator simulcast up against Classic Hits rivals KMXR and KCCT & K281AV.
11	Upon the conclusion of the 2018 iHeartRadio Music Awards via a simulcast, Variety Hits KHKN Little Rock flipped to Top 40/CHR as "Hot 94.9." The move gives the Arkansas Capitol City its second Top 40/CHR and new competition for Cumulus Media's conservative-minded KLAL after having the format to itself for the last eight years.
12	Rhythmic Top 40 KOSP Springfield introduced "2 Chicks and a Mic". The show is being promoted as the first all-female morning show in the Springfield market, hosted by Amber Nix and Lauren, the latter a holdover from the "Chris & Company" program.
13	Another radio shake up takes place in Little Rock, as Flinn Broadcasting sells R&B/Hip-Hop KZTS to Salem Communications for $1.1 million plus a time brokerage agreement before closing. It is expected to flip formats upon completion of the deal.
15	iHeartMedia, America's largest broadcaster with 850 stations, files for chapter 11 bankruptcy after accumulating $20 billion in debt.
16	After a nearly 15-month run with Mainstream AC, WTDY-FM Philadelphia flipped to Adult Top 40, billing themselves as "96.5 TDY," with a more current-focused direction and recurrents from the 2000s. The move fills a void left open since August 2017 when WISX flipped to Rhythmic AC (WTDY-FM would later return to Top 40/CHR in November).
16–18	A major Alternative format war takes place in the Albany/Schenectady/Troy market. At 5p.m. (EDT) on March 16, Pamal Broadcasting's Sports WINU is the first to flip as "Alt 104.9," bringing that format back to the Capital District for the first time since 2010. But on March 18, Townsquare Media's Adult Top 40 WQSH also flipped to the same format (as "Alt 105.7") after a weekend stunting with music from Ireland-centric acts (including U2 and The Cranberries) in conjunction with Saint Patrick's Day.
19	WEOA Evansville makes a transition from Urban AC to R&B/Hip-Hop, giving the market its first full–time format with the genre.
19	Townsquare moves KRVK's format from classic rock to Adult hits as the new 107.9 Jack FM.
19	Gregg "Opie" Hughes signs a syndication deal with Westwood One that will see Hughes develop a podcast for the network as well as a terrestrially syndicated program to be determined at a later date.
27	Four stations owned by Cumulus Media, Oldies KJMO Linn/Jefferson City, Missouri, Country WNUQ Sylvester/Albany, Georgia, Country WPCK Denmark/Green Bay, and Sports WTOD Delta, Ohio/Toledo, are placed in a divestiture trust after the company agreed to give up their grandfathered waivers in order to emerge from bankruptcy status.
27	After a three-year attempt with a hybrid News/Classic Hits direction, KNEN Norfolk, Nebraska returned to Mainstream Rock and its "94 Rock" moniker.
27	WRQY Wheeling, West Virginia drops the hybrid Active Rock/Sports format in favor of Classic Rock, a move that will allow the station to become more competitive with Mainstream Rock rival and market leader WEGW.

=== April ===
Date	Event
1	For the first time since WRPW flipped formats to Talk in 2007, Bloomington/Normal picks up a Rhythmic Top 40 again, as WWHX transitions from Top 40/CHR "Hits 100.7" to "Hot 100, The Beat of BloNo."
2	Another radio format shake up takes place in Harrisburg, as iHeart's Top 40/CHR WHKF directs listeners to its Lancaster sibling WLAN-FM. On April 4, the station flipped to Alternative as "Alt 99.3," giving the market its first Alternative outlet since WQXA's transition to Mainstream Rock.
6	Univision's Regional Mexican outlet KLTN in Houston rebranded as "Que Buena 102.9" after 20 years as "Estereo Latino 102.9" and simply "102.9". The brand returns to the market since December 2017, when sister station KQBU-FM dropped that brand and its Regional Mexican format to simulcast their sister station KAMA-FM's Spanish Top 40 format.
9	Entravision Communications makes major cuts and layoffs at all of its properties, including releasing key air staffers at the company's 49 radio outlets.
10	Just one day after Sinclair-owned ABC affiliate KDNL-TV St. Louis pulled its weeknight news/commentary program The Allman Report, Conservative host Jamie Allman's morning talk show on KFTK-FM is cancelled and the host fired, which comes just two weeks after he posted a Twitter message alluding to wanting to assault Stoneman Douglas High School shooting survivor-turned-activist David Hogg with a fireplace poker, in criticism of his gun control activism, and an ensuing boycott from viewers and the show's advertisers. The move comes as KFTK prepares to change ownership from Emmis to Entercom, already dealing with the KEGY situation.
16	Parents of two of the victims of the 2012 Sandy Hook Elementary School shooting sue radio host Alex Jones, who has long claimed the shooting was faked. They are seeking $1 million. The parents cited evidence and statements from his interviews on Sunday Night with Megyn Kelly and Anderson Cooper 360 as reasons, which Jones claimed on his website InfoWars and eponymous radio show that their appearance to counter his claim was digitally altered at the time, of which both shows have dismissed.
23	WCKG & W272DQ Elmhurst, Illinois (serving the Chicago Area) changed their format from news/talk/variety to sports, with programming from Fox Sports Radio.
24	Colonial Media and Entertainment attempts to exit the Twin Tiers market after ten years and only limited inroads, announcing the sale of its cluster of stations (mainstream country WAGL Eldred, Pennsylvania; adult country WVTT Portville, New York; and classic rock WXMT Smethport, Pennsylvania) to Rick Freeman in exchange for $50,000 cash and, in what is believed to be the first time an FCC license sale has involved cryptocurrency, approximately $565,000 in Ideum tokens. The sale collapses as cryptocurrency rapidly loses value in 2018, and the Eldred station is instead sold to regional Christian broadcaster Family Life Network, with Colonial keeping the stations in Smethport and Portville.
27	WPYO Orlando transitioned from a Hip-Hop intensive Rhythmic presentation to a Top 40/CHR direction, but continue to favor Rhythmic hits and kept some of the air staff. The move was due to WQMP's sudden flip to Alternative in November 2017, and to a decline in the Nielsen Audio ratings with the previous direction.
30	CFTE Vancouver, British Columbia ends its simulcast with TSN Radio 1040 CKST as it becomes BNN Bloomberg radio 1410 with an all-business news format in conjunction with the relaunch of Bell Media's 24-hour business news channel BNN to the BNN Bloomberg branding.

=== May ===
Date	Event
1	Urban One spins off Detroit Gospel outlet WPZR to Educational Media Foundation for $12.5 Million. The Gospel format will move to a trio of translators and to the HD2 sub channel of Urban AC WDMK.
1	KZDG San Francisco drops time brokered Radio Zindagi (which moved to KLOK in San Jose, and is simulcast on KITS-HD2), and moves to a simulcast of 95.7 FM, which had become sports radio station KGMZ-FM, under new KGMZ calls. The station serves as an overflow outlet for KGMZ-FM, and began to air Oakland Athletics games that conflict with Golden State Warriors broadcasts on the FM signal.
3	NPR forms a consortium with two of its largest member stations, WNYC in New York and WBEZ in Chicago, to purchase the mobile app Pocket Casts from its Australian founders.
3	The heritage KUBE branding returns to Seattle, as Top 40/CHR KPWK flipped back to Rhythmic Top 40 after 2 1/2 years. Concurrently with the move, Adult Top 40 sister KBKS shifted back to Top 40/CHR, thus reversing a shuffling of formats that took place in January 2016 which saw KUBE's calls and format move to former sister station KKBW (104.9) and KBKS’ Top 40/CHR format move to KUBE's 93.3 frequency, only to have KUBE and its Rhythmic format relocated to the 93.3-HD2 sub-channel after iHeart divested the 104.9 signal to a trust upon acquiring KJAQ and KZOK from Entercom in November 2017.
18	CHTD-FM in St Stephen, New Brunswick dumps its country music format and the "Tide" branding as it flips to AC "98.1 Charlotte FM".
21	Urban One acquires Sports Talk WTEM Washington, D.C. for $4.2 Million. The station will continue as the flagship station of the Washington Redskins, including airing its gameday programming on the station. The Redskins has already retained WMAL & WMAL-FM as their broadcast partners for the games.
25	Dick Broadcasting makes format changes in two markets. In Myrtle Beach, South Carolina, Classic Hip-Hop WWHK & W288DK flipped to Classic Country, while in Savannah Classic Country WGCO dropped their format and began stunting during the weekend, leading up to a flip to Top 40/CHR as "Hot 98.3" on May 28.

=== June ===
Date	Event
6	After an eight-year run as Jack FM, WHPI Peoria flips to sports talk, branded as "ESPN Peoria", simulcasting sister station WZPN Farmington (WHPI has a better signal coverage, allowing it to expand into the eastern portion of the market). The latter would flip to Top 40/CHR as WHPI on September 5, 2020.
7	Top 40/CHR WBJZ Berlin, Wisconsin flips to a simulcast of Active Rock sibling WZOR Green Bay, thus expanding its coverage to the Appleton and Oshkosh metropolitan areas.
8	ESPN Radio loses an affiliate in Boise, as KQBL-HD2/K256CZ flipped to Active Rock as "I-Rock 99.1." The flip is expected to serve as a flanker for Alternative sister K243BM and to counter rival Active Rocker KQXR.
20	Top 40/CHR WWAC Atlantic City is acquired by Educational Media Foundation, which plans to replace the current format with K-Love programming.
25	E.W. Scripps Company sells its Tulsa radio cluster (Classic Hits KBEZ, Country KVOO-FM, Classic Country KXBL, Top 40/CHR KHTT, and News/Talk KFAQ) to Griffin Communications, thus returning the Oklahoma City-based television broadcaster back to owning radio stations (they currently own the Radio Oklahoma Network), and pairs the stations up with CBS affiliate KOTV-DT and CW sibling KQCW.

=== July ===
Date	Event
2	San Angelo, Texas picks up a second Top 40/CHR, as KELI transitions from Adult Top 40 and rebrand as "98.7 Kiss FM," putting it in competition with the market's longtime outlet KIXY-FM.
2	Marion, Virginia also picks up a Top 40/CHR, as Bristol Broadcasting drops the Country format of newly acquired WZVA and becomes "Hot 103.5," thus eliminating an overlapping with sister station WMEV-FM.
4	Classic Hits KWME Wellington/Wichita flips to Gold-leaning Rhythmic AC as "92.7 The Blast." The rimshot outlet brings the format back to the market after it was last dropped by sister station KKGQ in 2015.
6	All stations owned by Entercom are removed from TuneIn, and made exclusive to Radio.com, which Entercom acquired when it merged with CBS Radio in 2017. The existing CBS Radio stations that had used both TuneIn and Radio.com will also become exclusive to the latter starting August 1.
16	WNEW-FM adjusts to mainstream adult contemporary as "New 102.7" taking on veteran station "106.7 Lite FM" WLTW.
19	After 55 years of ownership, businessman Jerry Lee has sold AC WBEB Philadelphia to Entercom in a $57.5 million transaction. Entercom in turn sells Country WXTU back to Beasley Broadcasting in a $38 million deal, thus reversing a 2014 sale of the latter to CBS Radio, which Entercom would acquire in a 2017 merger.
25	WKXW-FM Trenton, New Jersey hosts Dennis Malloy and Judi Franco are suspended for ten days after calling New Jersey Attorney General Gurbir Grewal, a Sikh, "turban man".
27	E. W. Scripps Company announces the sale of its Milwaukee duo of stations, AM WTMJ and FM WKTI to Good Karma Brands, which owns ESPN Radio affiliate WAUK Jackson locally, and will give the latter control of the Packers, Brewers and Bucks radio networks (Good Karma owner Craig Karmazin is a minority owner of the Bucks). This would complete the unwinding of the former broadcast assets of the Milwaukee Journal Sentinel (including WTMJ-TV, which will remain with Scripps), which had all shared common ownership from the pre-Pearl Harbor era of television until 2015, when Scripps and Journal's print assets were spun off to a company eventually purchased by Gannett.
28	Just one year after launching with a Rhythmic Hot AC direction, only to later segue to Top 40/CHR, KQFX-FM Amarillo surprisingly flipped formats to Regional Mexican, simulcasting KBCX Dalhart. The flip occurred during a Salvation Army sock drive remote the staffers were doing and, they were notified of the switch during the event.

=== August ===
Date	Event
1	The Rhythmic Top 40 format returned to Little Rock, as the 96.5 frequency that was home to the original format's outlet KHTE is relaunched as KBKX under General Manager Joel ‘DJ No Name" Ratliff Sr. and Al Bradford (via a LMA with Crain Media), who had both previously worked at KHTE before moving over to then-R&B/Hip-Hop rival KZTS up until the latter's sale to Salem Media (who had operated KHTE with Conservative Talk under a LMA with Crain) in April.
2	Urban One's Urban Oldies/Classic Hip-Hop WOSF Charlotte transitions to Urban Adult Contemporary, billing itself on air as "105.3 Ol’ School & R&B." The shift moves the station into a more current direction with gold and recurrents from the 1990s and 2000s, as well as putting it in direct competition with Beasley Broadcasting's WBAV.
3	Bonneville International turn their LMA of the stations that was divested and placed in a trust by Entercom after the acquisition and merger with CBS Radio in November 2017 into a purchase outright. The Salt Lake City-based broadcaster will acquire San Francisco Bay Area outlets Top 40/CHR KMVQ-FM, AC KOIT and Urban AC KBLX-FM; San Jose Classic Rock KUFX; and Sacramento Sports Talk KHTK, AC KYMX, Adult Top 40 KZZO and Country KNCI, for $141 million. The deal is expected to close by the fourth quarter, pending FCC approval. The San Francisco deal reunites KOIT with Bonneville, and ironically returns the company back to having a CHR in its portfolio and in the same market, when it owned KZQZ during its tenure with the format from 1997 to 2002; Bonneville sold both stations in a swap with Entercom in 2007.
3	The Variety Hits format makes its return to CKNG-FM in Edmonton, Alberta as Adult Top 40 "92.5 Fresh Radio" rebrands to "92.5 The Chuck".
7	E.W. Scripps spins off its Boise cluster (AAA KRVB, Active Rock KQXR, Classic Rock KJOT, and Classic Hits KTHI) and its Tucson roster (AC KMXZ-FM, Conservative Talk KQTH, Rhythmic Oldies KTGV, and ESPN Radio affiliate KFFN/K285DL) to Lotus Communications. Lotus in turn spins off KQTH to Family Life Foundation (who'll convert it to non-commercial status) and KTGV to Bustos Media (who is expected to flip the format to Regional Mexican) due to ownership limits in the Tucson market.
9	Tribune Media, owners of WGN Chicago, withdraws its merger agreement and announces plans to sue Sinclair Broadcast Group for breach of contract after Sinclair insisted on selling WGN and several large-market television stations to companies with close personal ties to Sinclair to avoid ownership limits and maintain control of the stations.
10	CKHY-FM Halifax, Nova Scotia drops the "Live 105" moniker after 8 years to become "Rock 105.1 Halifax's Rock Station" with more of a mainstream rock sound as it takes on rival station CFRQ-FM.
15	E.W. Scripps spins off its final batch of radio clusters and ends its second tenure of owning radio stations, as it sells its stations in Wichita (Country KFDI-FM, Active Rock KICT-FM, Classic Rock KFXJ, Regional Mexican KYQQ and Classic Country KFTI), Springfield, Missouri (Country KTTS-FM, Top 40/CHR KSPW, Conservative Talk KSGF-AM-FM and Adult Hits KRVI), Omaha (Active Rock KEZO-FM, AC KSRZ, Top 40/CHR KQCH, Classic Rock KKCD and ESPN radio affiliate KXSP), and Knoxville (Top 40/CHR WWST, Country WCYQ, Rhythmic Top 40 WKHT, and Classic Hits WNOX) to SummitMedia, whose portfolio will grow to 50 once the sale is approved by the FCC.
15	Rogers Media shakes things up a bit by rebranding two of its local FM radio stations in Tillsonburg, Ontario. CKOT-FM slightly rebrands from Easy 101 to 101.3 Easy with a more popular mainstream AC sound while sister station CJDL-FM slightly adjusts to 107.3 Country joining other Rogers country stations to take on the unified Country branding.
17	With the LMA terminated and the KZTQ calls and Bob FM Adult Hits format moving over to KSGG/K241AK, KPGF Reno flips to All-80s music.
20	Media One Group, the dominant broadcaster in Jamestown, New York, buys its only significant competitor, Cross Country Communications, from the Rowbotham family. The sale will bring WKZA Lakewood into its fold and spin off WLKW-FM Celoron to the Educational Media Foundation, which will eventually introduce K-Love to Western New York. The purchase gives Media One Group a monopoly on commercial radio in the Jamestown market.
20	Adult Top 40 KTCZ-FM/Minneapolis-St. Paul returns to Triple-A with a lean toward Modern Hot AC product.
25	Reno will once again have an alternative station after being without one for a year, as KWFP fills the void as "Alt 92.1" and moves its Country format and "The Wolf" branding to K236CN and KRFN-HD2, where in turn replaces the Classic Country simulcast of KCMY/K273AF Carson City.
31	KBFP-FM/Bakersfield drops Regional Mexican for AC as "Sunny 105.3," putting it in competition with the more established KGFM.
31	Alpha Media makes format adjustments at its Louisville outlets. Classic Hip-Hop WGHL flips to Alternative as "Alt 105.1" (filling a void that has been left open for ten years), while its Urban AC sister WMJM picks up the former's content and shifts to a more recurrent-based direction featuring 1990s and 2000s product.
31	CJUK-FM, Thunder Bay, Ontario drops Hot AC/CHR for classic hits as 99.9 The Bay.

=== September ===
Date	Event
1	Just five months after picking up the displaced "Streetz" branding and R&B/Hip-Hop format, KZTS/K288EZ Little Rock flipped to Gospel. The move comes as owner Salem Media takes management of the station back from Core Communicators, who had picked up the displaced format after Salem acquired the previous "Streetz" home and KZTS calls that were originally located at 101.1 in April.
4	KEZW Denver evolves from 50s–60s Oldies to AC-based Soft Oldies with emphasis on songs from the 1950s to the 1980s, putting it in competition with rival Adult Standards/MOR rival KLVZ.
4	Seven years after being granted its license by the CRTC, CKNT Mississauga soft-launches its news/talk format.
5	WQTX Lansing drops Sports in favor of 90s Music as "92.1 Fuel FM."
6	KGSR Austin enters a cross-branding agreement to become "Austin City Limits Radio." The multi-genre music format is patterned after the television series and the accompanying festival of the same name, under a multi-year deal between Emmis Communications and Austin City Limits Enterprises.
6	The AC battle in Norfolk is relaunched again after eight years, as WVBW jettisons Classic Hits to once again take on Entercom's WWDE.
13	After a four-year run with Classic Hits, leading up to a stunting with Poetic Readings of various song lyrics, Midwest Communications’ KQSF Sioux Falls, South Dakota flipped to Top 40/CHR, keeping the "Q95.7" name. The station will target the well established (and second-ranked Nielsen Audio outlet) KKLS for listeners in the market.
17	The three-way Country battle in Denver has claimed a casualty, as Kroenke Sports & Entertainment announced that "Altitude Sports 950" KKSE would move to 92.5 on this date, replacing KWOF, which would also take the KKSE-FM calls. The AM switched to Fox Sports Radio full-time while the FM took on a local presentation that includes play-by-play for co-owned Denver Nuggets, Colorado Avalanche, and Colorado Rapids. The flip also put them in competition with rival Sports FM KKFN.
17	WESB Bradford, Pennsylvania drops full service for Hot AC and signs on a translator at 107.5 FM, rebranding as "B107.5."
21	Educational Media Foundation enters Panama City, Florida with the acquisition of Rhythmic Top 40 WPFM from Powell Broadcasting, who'll continue to retain ownership of its three remaining properties in the market, as well as the WPFM intellectual property.
24	SiriusXM acquires Pandora Media in a $3.5 billion deal that will create the world's largest audio content company. Sirius XM, which had already purchased a 19% stake in Pandora in June 2017 for $480 million, will give the satellite broadcaster an expanded 70 million monthly active users and greater expansion in Pandora's ad-generated tiers and in-car platforms.
24	Nielsen Audio announces that it will transfer its diary-rated markets to year-round measurement with monthly data releases, starting with the July 2019 ratings. The markets that are measured continuously every quarter will now be measured with a weighted tab of the previous three months, while markets that are currently only measured in the Spring and Fall books will follow at a later date.

=== October ===
Date	Event
4	Just three days after it pink slipped most of the air staff and a continued decline in ratings, Entercom's WIAD Washington, D.C. flipped from Adult Top 40 to Classic Hits as "94.7 The Drive." The flip also fills a void left open after ten years, but will focus on Gold-centric Pop, Rock, and R&B titles from the 1980s as well the bookending tracks that crossed over from the 1970s and into the 1990s.
16	WZLR Dayton shifted its to format from 80s classic rock to classic hits, emphasizing Pop hits from the 1980s, much like WIAD's description.
16	Citing a dissatisfaction in how they have been treated in terms of play-by-play broadcasts and having their games bumped to its AM sister to accommodate Golden State Warriors games and other live events, the Oakland A's announced that are ending their deal with KGMZ-FM San Francisco after one year (abruptly ending a four-year deal they made with the Entercom outlet in 2017), effective immediately.
19	WDQN and W246DU in Du Quoin, Illinois begin stunting with Christmas music. The stunt ends three days later as it returns to its previous adult contemporary format.
22–31	Alpha Media Top 40/CHR KBFF Portland will become the first station in the United States to set aside its current format to program a Halloween-centric music presentation, billing itself as "Evil 95.5" ("Evil" is "Live," the station's moniker, in reverse). The station's regular programming will resume November 1.
22–31	WWGE Loretto, Pennsylvania begins stunting with polka and variety music, changing its call sign to WYUP, ahead of its adoption of a new format (variety hits as Jack FM) November 1.
22–31	K240EL/Austin, Texas flips from Urban AC to classic hip-hop as "Hot 95.9".
30	WTRV Grand Rapids becomes the first non-stunting station in the U.S. to flip to Christmas music for the 2018 season. The change is substantially later than the mid-October start dates typically seen by at least one or two stations most years in the 2010s and comes just two days before the November 1 wave of post-Halloween flips.

=== November ===
Date	Event
1	After a four-year run with country, WKTI Milwaukee flipped to ESPN Radio, as it assumes the programming from, and share the simulcast of, play-by-play broadcasts of Marquette University sports with sister WAUK on a short-term basis. Brewers, Bucks and Green Bay Packers games will continue to broadcast from sister station WTMJ. A couple of days before the flip, Variety Hits WVTY Racine, who had picked up the aforementioned format from WKTI upon its flip to Country, took advantage of WKTI's flip and returned to the country format that WVTY had dropped at the time, thus allowing the station to cover the southern portion of the market while its West Bend sister WMBZ-FM covers the northwestern portion of the market.
1	After a week of stunting and speculation of a format flip, KBKS-FM Seattle relaunched its Top 40/CHR format that they returned to in May, this time shifting back to its Modern-leaning direction. The station also announced a search for a new morning host that would start in January 2019.
1	WJFX-HD2/W277AK Fort Wayne dropped Active Rock for Rhythmic CHR as "Loud 103.3", with an emphasis on Hip-Hop hits. The flip also brings the Rhythmic format back to the market after four years.
2	Crawford Broadcasting makes major changes in Birmingham. WXJC/W245CS expands its Christian Preaching format to sister WYDE-FM, thus expanding its coverage in Northern Alabama, including Huntsville, and in the process ends WYDE-FM's Conservative Talk format. The flip also leaves into question the fates of what format that is being planned for WYDE-FM's simulcasts WYDE/W237EK and rimshot WXJC-FM.
8	After four years with Classic Hip-Hop, the Minneapolis-Saint Paul trimulcast of WGVX/WLUP/WWWM flipped to Christmas music, reviving the Love 105 branding. A flip to adult contemporary is expected after the holidays.
8	After nearly four years with Country, iHeartMedia announced it would flip KBEB Sacramento to Soft Adult Contemporary as "92.5 The Breeze" on November 12. Prior to the switch, KBEB simulcast The "Bull" country format with K296GB during the transition.
8	WBZY Atlanta changed formats from regional Mexican to Spanish CHR, branded as "Z105.3".
9	WISX Philadelphia ends their Rhythmic AC format abruptly at noon for Christmas music, leading up to a flip to AC as "106.1 The Breeze" three days later. The station will challenge Entercom's WBEB, which rebranded back to "B101.1" several days earlier after dropping the "More FM" branding.
9	Christmas came early to Detroit, as WDZH dropped Top 40/CHR after nine years. On November 12, it too, like KBEB and WISX, also flipped to Soft AC as "98.7 The Breeze," becoming the first Entercom outlet other than iHeartMedia (which also owns rival WNIC-FM) to adopt "The Breeze" branding.
14	Just seven weeks after it was announced but was held up due last-minute paperwork between the two parties, Hubbard Broadcasting acquires Alpha Media's West Palm Beach cluster (Country WIRK, AC WRMF, Sports WMEN, News-Talk WFTL & W242CI, Classic Hits WEAT-FM, Urban AC WMBX, and Rhythmic Top 40 translator WMBX-HD2/W242CI) in an $88 million deal. The sale brings the Minnesota-based broadcaster back to Florida for the first time since the sale of WTOG Tampa in 1995.
19	WIWF in Charleston, South Carolina flips to Christmas Music and returns to its "96.9 The Wolf" branding after the holidays, abandoning its parent company's national Nash FM branding. The station was trailing Country rivals WCKN and WEZL in the Nielsen Audio Spring 2018 ratings. On December 26, the Cumulus Media outlet flipped to Classic Hits utilizing the revived branding, as it faces competition from Variety Hits WAVF and Classic Hits trimulcast WQNT/W221CI/W271CP.
19	iHeartMedia's syndicated country music morning show host Bobby Bones and partner Sharna Burgess are crowned winners of the 27th season of Dancing with the Stars. Bones is the first radio personality in the series to win the Mirrorball, and the first win for dancer Burgess.
21	LBI Media, the owners of sixteen radio stations in the Dallas, Houston, Los Angeles, and Riverside/San Bernardino markets, file for Chapter 11 bankruptcy, stating that it has outstanding funded debt obligations in the aggregate amount of approximately $530 million. The Spanish/multicultural broadcaster's lien lender, HPS Investment Partners is involved in litigation with an ad hoc group of its second lien noteholders, as well as seeking approval of up to $38 million in debtor-in-possession financing. it also has issues with creditors TMI Trust Company ($27,954,755), US Bank NA ($8,464,963), ASCAP ($1,977,292), and The A.C. Nielsen Company (Nielsen Media Research with $1,063,095 and Nielsen Audio with $532,798).
21	Alpha Media's Classic Country KTPK Topeka flipped to Christmas music, giving the Kansas State Capitol two outlets playing Holiday programming, the other being AC KMAJ-FM. Despite a Nielsen Audio ratings drop from a 10.2 in the Spring 2017 book to a 5.6 in the Spring 2018 report, KTPK returned to Classic Country December 26.
27	After eight years of Top 40/CHR, WRNW Milwaukee flipped to sports talk as "97.3 The Game" featuring Drew & KB in the morning show, "The Crossover" during middays featuring Dan Needles and Milwaukee Bucks announcer Ted Davis, The Double Team with Bob Brainerd and Dario Melendez, and the Mike Heller Show during afternoon drive (Sister station WOKY continues to originate their own sports talk format). Milwaukee now has five sports talk stations, joining WKTI/WAUK and the AM/FM translator simulcast of WSSP.
27	After a five-year run with Classic Hits, Art Laboe's KOKO-FM Fresno returned to rhythmic oldies as "Jammin’ 94.3." The flip once again puts them in competition with KMGV.
30	WDKB DeKalb, Illinois shifts directions from Mainstream AC to Adult Top 40.
30	WDOK Cleveland pulls the song "Baby, It's Cold Outside" and its cover versions from its annual Christmas Music playlist due to complaints from listeners over its lyrics, suggesting that it could be taken as a reference to sexual harassment or assault. DJ Glenn Anderson explained that "Now, I do realize that when the song was written in 1944, it was a different time, but now while reading it, it seems very manipulative and wrong. The world we live in is extra sensitive now, and people get easily offended, but in a world where #MeToo has finally given women the voice they deserve, the song has no place."

=== December ===
Date	Event
5	WBWD Islip, New York flipped from brokered variety programming to Bollywood music, branded as "Bolly 540 AM", the first of its kind in the New York City Metropolitan area.
6	After ten years at 106.7, KMEZ Port Sulphur/New Orleans returned to its former home at 102.9 (where it enjoyed a successful run from 1992 to 2008) and rebrand as "Z102.9," ending a nine-year run for Rhythmic Top 40 sister KKND. Both stations will simulcast until a new format is introduced in January 2019.
6	KBLR-FM Blair, Nebraska drops Classic Country and becomes a simulcast of Omaha Oldies sister KOMJ, thus expanding its coverage to the northern portion of the market but will retain local content in the area.
10	WPPZ-FM Philadelphia flipped from urban gospel (which moved to WPPZ's HD2 subchannel) to 1970s–1980s based Urban Oldies as "Classix 107.9," thus filling a void left open by WISX's flip to Soft AC. This sudden flip results in Urban AC sister WRNB dropping the older product and moving to a current-based direction with 1990s–2000s recurrents.
10	WCLB Sheboygan, Wisconsin switches from a near full-time automated feed of Fox Sports Radio to hot AC top 40 as "Z107.3", a month after launching an FM translator, W297CK. The format is programmed and operated by outside company Martini Media in lieu of station owner Mountain Dog Media.
11	Cleveland picked up a second R&B/Hip-Hop outlet, as iHeart Media flipped W291BV, the AC-formatted FM translator and HD2 sub channel of Top 40/CHR WAKS, to "Real 106.1." The new competitor will face off against Urban One's WENZ, already the third most listened-to station in the market.
12	Just six months after having signed on, Media One Broadcasting's Atlanta R&B/Hip-Hop translator W222AF (whose HD3 subchannel is WSRV) is taken off the air due to a dispute between Cox Media Group (the owners of WSRV) and Media One owner Larry Edwards, who operated the station through a leasing deal with Immanuel Broadcasting, which owns W222AF. The station's format continues online while the parties work out an arrangement to put the station back on the air.
12	KLO Ogden/Salt Lake City drops Conservative Talk and temporarily fills the void with Christmas Music. The station will flip to Adult Standards as "Unforgettable 1430" and feature programming from Westwood One's "America's Best Music" network after the Holidays.
13	WZTE North East/Erie, Pennsylvania begins stunting with a format based around a Patriotic theme, featuring unique reading of the United States Constitution, mixed with patriotic band music, billed as "Freedom 1530". On January 1, 2019, WZTE flipped to Conservative Talk.
14	K265CA/KZRR-HD2 Albuquerque dropped the Urban Contemporary format as well as "The Beat" branding after five years and flipped to Christmas music as "Santa 100.9" which was previously used back in 2013. On December 26, the FM translator/HD2 simulcast flipped to Soft AC and adopted "The Breeze" branding, a move that prompted Vanguard Media, the owners of rival KRKE-FM, to flip KMYN Grants, New Mexico from a simulcast of Smooth Jazz sister KOAZ/K279BP to Soft AC and takes "The Breeze" branding as a pre-empted strike before another station in Grants adopts the moniker.
21	iHeart Media spins off its 89.1% stake in Clear Channel Outdoor, which will retain its current name (as Clear Channel Outdoor Holdings) upon emerging from Chapter 11 bankruptcy restructuring.
22	During a radio/television simulcast of a game between the Buffalo Sabres and Anaheim Ducks, Sabres broadcaster Rick Jeanneret suffers a medical emergency and abruptly cuts out of the broadcast, leaving color commentator Rob Ray and on-site studio host Brian Duff to call play-by-play for the remainder of the game. Jeanneret is in his 47th season with the Sabres.
24	A series of separate deals are announced on this date. Educational Media Foundation expands its coverage in Corpus Christi, with the purchase of Regional Mexican KMJR from Tejas Broadcasting for $432,000. EMF currently owns KPLV and KXAI in the Corpus Christi market, while Tejas will retain its other three FMs. EMF also adds purchased Classic Rock WATG Trion, Georgia from TTA Broadcasting for $200,000. Meanwhile, Perry Broadcasting spins off seven stations and three translators in the Lawton (Urban KJMZ, Country KACO, Urban AC KXCA & K229DG and Sports KKRX & K244FW) and Duncan, Oklahoma markets (Country KKEN, Classic Rock KDDQ, and News/Talk KPNS & K291CT) to Matthew Mollman's Mollman Media for $3 million.
26	"The Breeze" Soft AC branding comes to Canada, as Classic Hits sister stations CHLG-FM Vancouver and CKRA-FM Edmonton becomes the latest outlets in the country to adopt the monikers. While CHLG will take on the more established CHQM-FM in Vancouver, CKRA filled the format void in Edmonton.
26	"The Breeze" brand makes its way into Buffalo, as WMSX transitions from Adult Top 40 back to Soft AC.
26	After two years with AC and struggling ratings, WPBB Tampa flips to Classic Rock, billing itself as "98.7 The Shark."
26	Palm Springs picks up another hybrid LGBTQ/EDM-formatted outlet, as former Classic Hits KVGH & K293CL enters the fray with a non-Profit presentation, joining the commercially-centric KQPS, who launched their format in October.
26	WHOF Canton, Ohio transitions from Mainstream AC to family-friendly Soft AC and rebrands from "My 101.7" to "Sunny 101.7." The move comes on the heels of rival Adult Top 40 WHBC-FM adjusting their direction to a current-based direction and the addition of the Dave & Jimmy Show, which happens to be syndicated from WHOF's Top 40/CHR sister station in Columbus, WNCI.

== Debuts ==
Date	Event
March 22	At 9p.m. (EDT) on this date, Diplo's Revolution, a Dance/EDM channel created by Diplo featuring Rhythmic Dance content hand-picked by the artist as well as live DJ and concert sets, debuted on SiriusXM 52. The channel will serve as the successor of the Trance/House-focused Electric Area, which will go away after 18 years, with most of its content moving over to BPM.
June 29	Anna Faris Is Unqualified, a lifestyle/entertainment podcast hosted by the actress and the star of Mom, debuts on iHeart Radio's Top 40/CHR outlets in a broadcast-safe re-edited form.
August 13	ABC Radio Networks launches a syndicated morning program hosted by Dana Cortez, which is expected to be tailored towards Rhythmic Top 40 outlets. Cortez had hosted mornings at KBBT San Antonio and voice tracking for KKSS Albuquerque and KVVF/KVVZ San Jose-San Francisco until July 27. Cortez's program is added to KKSS and is picked up by KBBT's Rhythmic rival KTFM on this date as the first affiliates.
August 31	Entercom launched "Out Now Radio", an LGBTQ-centric HD Talk/Dance platform, in nine markets. On November 1, Classic Hits KEZN/Palm Springs was named the flagship station, which was rebranded as "Channel Q".
September 8	C'est formidable!, hosted by Florence Khoriaty, debuts on CBC Radio One and CBC Music in Canada as a replacement for À Propos.

== Closings ==
Date	Event
January 1	Religious program The Overcomer Ministry with Brother Stair ended its radio broadcasts. The move comes after its host was charged with several felony counts of sexual assault and burglary on December 18 of last year and most of its affiliates dropped the program.
January 5	Robert Siegel anchored All Things Considered for the final time, retiring after three decades with the NPR afternoon program and 41 years as an anchor/correspondent at the network.
January 8	Entravision ended the formats of Spanish Top 40 "Super Estrella" and Spanish Adult Hits "Jose" in twelve markets, converting several into either Regional Mexican "Radio Tricolor" or Regional Mexican Oldies "Suavecita" brandings.
January 18	After 32 years, Rowan College at Burlington County announces that it is ceasing operations on eclectic AAA WBZC (Burlington, New Jersey) on this date. The programming moved to an online webcast.
February 28	Citing financial and leasing issues, Classical outlet XHLNC-FM (serving San Diego from Tecate, Baja California, Mexico) vacated the 104.9 frequency and return to an online website, where it originally launched in 1998 before moving to the 90.7 signal in 2000.
March 29	Imus in the Morning aired its last broadcast, as host Don Imus retired after a 50-year career in radio.
March 30	After a 50-year career that included stops in New Mexico (a 20-year run at KKOB-FM Albuquerque), Miami, Dallas, and San Diego, John Forsythe has retired from radio, as he marked his final stint as morning host at AC WMGF Orlando on this date after eight years in that position.
May 15	Three AM radio stations in the Albany, New York market simultaneously go silent: WAIX, WPTR and WABY.
August 20	United States Traffic Network shuts down operations altogether, with its final data delivered September 1. The closing of USTN stems from a failed deal that Entercom made with them in May after it had signed a new agreement that included an equity stake, only to later announce that they would take back a portion of their previous ad inventory from USTN from April and the remaining inventory afterwards, resulting in USTN suing Entercom on July 24 for breach of contract, seeking $5 million in damages, of which Entercom dismiss as frivolous.
September 2	Longtime Canadian radio host Jim Corcoran hosts his final episode of À Propos.
October 13	In the aftermath of Hurricane Michael, which produced Category 4 winds sustained at 155 miles per hour (249 km/h) near its eyewall at the time it moved ashore on the Florida Panhandle coast on October 9, Powell Broadcasting announced that its Panama City stations will cease operations immediately due to its transmitters being destroyed and its studios damaged, making it financially difficult to rebuild the properties.
November 19	WYZE Atlanta goes dark, ending its 38-year run as a brokered Gospel outlet. Jacob Bogan, vice president of WYZE's owner GHB Broadcasting, said technical issues regarding its signal were to too cost prohibitive to fix, and is looking to sell the station.
November 21	Fredric U. Dicker ends his weekly radio show after 21 years.
December 21	Citing poor ratings, Steve Dahl will end his terrestrial radio show on WLS Chicago after a four-year run and return solely to podcasting. WLS parent company Cumulus Media will continue to manage the podcast while WLS undergoes a revamp of its lineup as the station tries to improve its drive time ratings, which have fallen to levels among the worst in the market.
December TBA	After 17 years, The Laura Ingraham Show is withdrawn from syndication, with the eponymous host departing to concentrate on her nightly Fox News Channel program The Ingraham Angle and raising her children. Courtside Entertainment Group, Ingraham's syndicator, will continue to offer a shorter daily podcast hosted by Ingraham.

== Deaths ==
Date	Name	Age	Notability	Ref
January 3	Lara Kruger	30	South African DJ (Motsweding FM) and transgender rights advocate	
January 4	John "Bucks" Braun	68	American DJ (WBZI Xenia, Ohio; WONE-FM Dayton, Ohio; and stations in Florida, Mississippi, Arizona, and Kentucky)	
January 8	Vojtěch Lindaur	60	Czech journalist, radio host (Radio Beat) and record producer.	
January 9	Milton J. Rosenberg	92	American psychology professor (University of Chicago) and radio host (WGN Chicago)	
January 9	Wes Strader	79	American sports announcer (Western Kentucky Hilltoppers).	
January 20	John Corby	61	American radio host (WTVN and WNCI in Columbus, Ohio and KDKA in Pittsburgh, Pennsylvania)	
February 9	Al Wester	93	American sportscaster (Notre Dame Fighting Irish football, New Orleans Saints Radio Network, NFL on Mutual)	
February 9	"Sunshine" Sonny Payne	92	American DJ, host of King Biscuit Time on KFFA in Helena, Arkansas	
February 21	Billy Graham	99	American evangelist, creator of Hour of Decision	
February 28	Barry Crimmins	64	American activist and stand-up comic (writer and correspondent for Air America Radio)	
March 5	Trevor Baylis	80	English inventor of the windup radio	
March 7	Woody Durham	76	American sportscaster (North Carolina Tar Heels)	
March 12	Mark Brush	49	American digital media director at Michigan Radio	
March 14	Barbara Sommers	64	American radio and television personality/voiceover talent in the Philadelphia market, notably as an alumnus of WFIL and WUSL	
March 14	Jim Bowen	80	British TV and radio host (BBC Radio Lancashire, Indigo FM)	
March 16	Hank Hollingsworth	78	American news anchor/sports announcer (KBOR Brownsville, Texas)	
April 5	Tyler Bieber	29	Canadian air staffers and sports play-by-play announcers at CHBO-FM Humboldt, Saskatchewan	
April 5	Brody Hinz	36	Canadian air staffers and sports play-by-play announcers at CHBO-FM Humboldt, Saskatchewan	
April 8	Joe McConnell	79	American sportscaster for numerous teams	
April 13	Art Bell	72	American paranormal late-night radio host (original host of Coast to Coast AM, Art Bell's Dark Matter, Dreamland and Midnight in the Desert), amateur radio operator (call sign W6OBB), founder of FM station KNYE Pahrump, Nevada	
April 14	Mike Joseph	90	American radio consultant, conceived the Hot Hits format	
April 16	Jim "The Jazz" Caine	91	Manx jazz pianist and radio host (Sweet and Swing)	
April 17	Carl Kasell	84	American radio personality (judge on Wait Wait... Don't Tell Me! and reporter on Morning Edition, both for NPR)	
April 17	Ken Dolan	75	American financial advisor and radio host (along with wife Daria Dolan, hosted shows on NBC Talknet and WOR Radio Network)	
April 18	Dale Winton	62	British TV host and radio DJ (host of Pick of the Pops on BBC Radio 2, and DJ on United Biscuits Network and Radio Trent)	
April 19	Stuart Coleman	73	British record producer, music journalist, and broadcaster (host of Echoes on BBC Radio London and DJ on Capital Gold)	
April 19	Darrell Eastlake	75	Australian TV sportscaster and radio sports reporter (2UW)	
April 19	Gil Santos	78	American sportscaster (WBZ Boston, New England Patriots Radio Network)	
April 20	Al Swift	82	American politician and host at Walla Walla, Washington stations KUJ and KXLE	
April 22	Dave Nelson	73	American retired baseball player and coach. Radio color commentator for the Chicago Cubs and Cleveland Indians.	
April 23	Don Bustany	89	American broadcaster (co-creator of American Top 40 and American Country Countdown, host of Middle East in Focus on KPFK Los Angeles)	
April 25	Lana Jones	62	American reporter on Boston stations WBZ, WAAF, WMJX and WHDH	
April 28	Claire Gregorian	80	American philanthropist and co-founder of Rhode Island Public Radio	
May 2	Tania Khanna	26	Indian radio presenter	
May 3	Billy Fourquet	57	Puerto Rican radio DJ and co-host of El Despelote on WODA Bayamon	
May 6	Ray Szmanda	91	American announcer on Menards commercials from 1976 to 1998	
May 7	Thomas Hempel	76	Swedish radio journalist, host of Ekots lördagsintervju on Dagens Eko	
May 14	Frank Quilici	79	American baseball player, coach, and color commentator, all for the Minnesota Twins	
June 4	Ahmed Said	93	Egyptian broadcaster (Voice of the Arabs)	
June 5	Daša Drndić	71	Croatian novelist and radio playwright (Radio Belgrade)	
June 9	Deborah Cameron	59/60	Australian journalist and radio presenter (ABC Radio Sydney)	
June 10	Paddy Feeny	87	British broadcaster (host of Sportsworld on BBC World Service)	
June 12	Al Meltzer	89	American sportscaster, best known for his work in Philadelphia television (radio work included Buffalo Bills Radio Network duties from 1972 to 1978)	
June 24	Dan Ingram	83	American disc jockey at New York City stations WCBS-FM and WABC, as well as WNHC New Haven, Connecticut, WICC Bridgeport, Connecticut, KBOX Dallas, Texas, and WIL, St. Louis, Missouri	
July 5	Ed Schultz	64	American populist radio host (hosted News and Views as a conservative talk host and The Ed Schultz Show as a progressive talk host) and sportscaster (play-by-play voice of the North Dakota State Bison football team from 1982 to 1996)	
July 9	Barbara Carlson	80	American politician and host on KSTP Saint Paul, Minnesota	
July 18	Adrian Cronauer	79	American Air Force sergeant and disc jockey on American Forces Network during the Vietnam War who become the subject of the film Good Morning, Vietnam. Also founded WPTS-FM Pittsburgh, Pennsylvania and worked at WVTF Roanoke, Virginia.	
July 25	György Szepesi	96	Hungarian journalist and radio sportscaster (Magyar Rádió)	
August 7	Vicki Archer	41	British DJ (BBC Radio Shropshire)	
August 27	John Asher	62	American sportscaster at Louisville, Kentucky stations WHAS and WAVE	
September 5	Rachael Bland	40	British journalist (BBC Radio 5 Live)	
September 19	Dave Barrett	63	American radio journalist (CBS News Radio, ABC Radio News, Fox News Radio, ESPN Radio), three-time Edward R. Murrow Award winner	
September 19	Denis Norden	96	British comedy writer and broadcast personality (Take It from Here, My Music)	
September 24	Merv Smith	85	New Zealand talk show host (1ZB)	
October 2	Ron Casey	89	Australian host at Sydney stations 2SM, 2KY, and 2GB	
October 4	Walter Capiau	80	Belgian host (Radio 2)	
October 5	Rowena Baird		South African host (Radio BOP)	
October 5	Ian Hutoryanski	87	Russian correspondent (Radio Mayak)	
October 6	Ray Galton	88	British comedy writer (Hancock's Half Hour)	
October 6	Bert Nederlof	72	Dutch journalist and sportscaster (commentator on Langs de Lijn on Nederlandse Omroep Stichting)	
October 6	Paul James	87	American sportscaster (BYU Cougars, Utah Utes)	
October 11	Duncan Johnson	80	Canadian-British DJ (Radio London, Radio Northsea, Invicta Radio, Radio 1, Radio Luxembourg, Pirate Radio Essex, CJOC, BBC)	
October 21	Joachim Rønneberg	99	Norwegian Army officer and broadcaster (NRK)	
October 23	Hank Greenwald	83	American sportscaster (San Francisco Giants, New York Yankees)	
October 30	Rico J. Puno	65	Filipino Jukebox Singer	
November 14	Bruce Winter	64	American program director; also continuity/underwriting announcement voice of WUWM Milwaukee	
November 15	Roy Clark	85	American country musician (member of the Grand Ole Opry)	
November 17	Richard Baker	93	English broadcaster (BBC News, Start the Week, Melodies for You)	
November 17	George Jonescu	84	Canadian radio personality (Big Band Sunday Night on CFZM Toronto)	
November 18	Neil Collins	77	New Zealand broadcaster (4ZB, Radio Dunedin) and politician	
November 18	Weeshie Fogarty	77	Irish Gaelic footballer and sports broadcaster (Radio Kerry)	
November 18	Jennie Stoller	72	British actress (member of the BBC's Radio Drama Company)	
November 30	Stefanie Tücking	56	German TV/radio presenter (Südwestrundfunk)	
December 4	Lester Kinsolving	90	American talk show host (WCBM Baltimore)	
December 10	J. R. Reitz	66	American DJ at Boston-area stations WFHN, WBSM, and WPLM-FM	
