= KZJF =

Radio station in Jefferson City, Missouri (2000–2018)

- Jefferson City, Missouri; United States
- Frequency: 104.1 MHz

Programming
- Format: Classic hits

Ownership
- Owner: Cumulus Media; (Cumulus Licensing LLC)
- Sister stations: KBBM; KBXR; KFRU; KLIK; KOQL; KJMO; KPLA

History
- First air date: 2000 (as KJCQ)
- Last air date: May 25, 2018
- Former call signs: KBQF (1999–2000); KJCQ (2000–2001); KLIK-FM (2001–2003); KBBM (2003); KJMO (2003–2006)
- Call sign meaning: "Jeff" (former name)

Technical information
- Licensing authority: FCC
- Facility ID: 5383
- Class: A
- ERP: 5,300 watts
- HAAT: 106 meters (348 ft)
- Transmitter coordinates: 38°33′50.1″N 92°11′21.7″W

Links
- Public license information: Public file; LMS
- Website: Z104.1 Former website now forwards to Cumulus Media

KZJF (104.1 FM) was a radio station that broadcast a classic hits format. Licensed to Jefferson City, Missouri, United States, the station was owned by Cumulus Media.

== History ==
The station was assigned the call letters KBQF on October 29, 1999. The call letters were changed to KJCQ on May 19, 2000, to KLIK-FM on November 16, 2001, to KBBM on July 21, 2003, to KJMO on September 12, 2003, and to KZJF on July 12, 2006.

On October 5, 2013, KZJF changed formats from country music as "Jeff 104.1" to sports talk as "104.1 The Fan"; the format was moved from sister station KBBM (100.1 FM). The format switch was completed two days later, when KBBM joined Cumulus Media's nationwide country branding as "Nash FM 100.1" after stunting for a day with Christmas music as "Santa 100.1".

KZJF was affiliated with CBS Sports Radio and, with the exception of a local program The Closers that was simulcast on Columbia sister station KFRU (1400 AM), aired the entire CBS Sports Radio lineup. KZJF was also the mid-Missouri affiliate of the Kansas City Royals and carried most national sporting events from Westwood One, including NFL football broadcasts and the NCAA men's basketball tournament.

On June 22, 2015 at Noon, 104.1 flipped to classic hits as "Z104.1, Jefferson City’s Classic Hits". Tim Thomas, afternoon host at sister station KPLA, added additional duties as morning host. The rest of the day utilized Westwood One's Classic Hits network. Kansas City Royals baseball broadcasts remained on the station.

Cumulus Media shut down KZJF and returned the license to the Federal Communications Commission (FCC) on May 25, 2018; the license was canceled on May 30. The classic hits format and Kansas City Royals broadcasts were transferred to sister station KJMO (97.5 FM). The shut down came in the wake of the bankruptcy restructuring of Cumulus Media; had KZJF not been shut down, it would have been required to divest KJMO. KJMO would itself be closed by Cumulus in 2025.
