= KJMO =

Currently silent
- Linn, Missouri; United States
- Broadcast area: Jefferson City and vicinity
- Frequency: 97.5 MHz (HD Radio)
- Branding: 97.5 KJMO

Programming
- Format: Classic hits

Ownership
- Owner: Cumulus Media; (sale to Educational Media Foundation pending); (Cumulus Licensing LLC)
- Sister stations: KBBM; KBXR; KFRU; KLIK; KOQL; KPLA

History
- First air date: 2006
- Former call signs: KZJF (2006)

Technical information
- Licensing authority: FCC
- Facility ID: 162262
- Class: A
- ERP: 6,000 watts
- HAAT: 100 meters (330 ft)
- Transmitter coordinates: 38.499°N 91.884°W

Links
- Public license information: Public file; LMS

KJMO (97.5 FM) is a radio station serving Central Missouri, United States, with a classic hits music format. This station broadcasts in HD and is under ownership of Cumulus Broadcasting.

== History ==
As of 2008, much of the programming featured on KJMO was from Scott Shannon's The True Oldies Channel from ABC Radio. Richard Matthews was the live and local morning show host.

On March 27, 2018, Cumulus filed to transfer KJMO and three other stations (WTOD, WPCK, and WNUQ) into the Cumulus Reorganization Divestiture Trust for a future sale. As of May 31, 2018, KJMO had dropped its oldies format, by then provided by Westwood One's Good Time Oldies format, in favor of the classic hits format previously heard on sister station KZJF; Cumulus had shut down KZJF and surrendered its license to the Federal Communications Commission (FCC), eliminating the need for the company to sell KJMO or any other station in the Columbia/Jefferson City market as part of its bankruptcy restructuring.

KJMO went silent in March 2025. It was one of 11 Cumulus stations to cease operations over the weekend of March 14, as part of a broader shutdown of underperforming stations by the company. The closure, which also included another Mid-Missouri station, was reported locally by the Jefferson City News-Tribune. In December 2025, K-Love Inc. acquired KJMO.
