= ZUN =

ZUN may refer to:

- ZUN (video game developer), the sole member of Team Shanghai Alice, an independent game developer of the Touhou Project series.
- The FAA code of Black Rock Airport.
- The IATA code of Chicago Union Station.
- The ISO 639-2 code for the Zuni language.

== See also ==
- Zun, a type of Chinese ritual bronze or ceramic wine vessel
