= WUKV =

WUKV may refer to:

- WUKV (FM), a radio station (95.7 FM) licensed to serve Trion, GA, United States
- WSGR (FM), a radio station (88.3 FM) licensed to serve New Boston, Ohio, United States, which held the call sign WUKV from 2011 to 2018
- WOXX, a radio station (97.1 FM) licensed to serve Colebrook, New Hampshire, United States, which held the call sign WUKV from 2008 to 2011
