= Ribbing =

Ribbing is a Swedish noble family of medieval origin. which may refer to:

- Adolph Ribbing (1765–1843), Swedish count and politician who took part in the regicide of Gustav III in 1792
- Beata Rosenhane (1638–1674, spouse of Baron Erik Ribbing), Swedish writer
- Elizabeth Ribbing (1596–1662), Swedish noble and lady-in-waiting, secret morganatic spouse of Prince Charles, second son of King Charles IX
- Herbert Ribbing (1897–1985), Swedish diplomat
- Magdalena Ribbing (1940–2017), Swedish writer, journalist, etiquette expert and lecturer

== See also ==
- Ribbing (knitting)
- Rib (disambiguation)
