= WATG =

WATG may refer to:

- WVGC (AM), a radio station (1400 AM) licensed to serve Elberton, North Carolina, United States, which held the call sign WATG in 2022
- WUKV (FM), a radio station (95.7 FM) licensed to serve Trion, Georgia, United States, which held the call sign WATG from 1992 to 2019
- Wimberly Allison Tong & Goo, an architectural design firm
