= K102 =

K102 or K-102 may refer to:

- K-102 (Kansas highway), a state highway in Kansas
- CKDK-FM, a radio station licensed in Woodstock, Ontario (former incarnation)
- KPLA, a radio station licensed in Columbia, Missouri (former incarnation)
- KEEY-FM, a radio station licensed in Minneapolis, Minnesota
- KRWK, a radio stations licensed in Fargo, North Dakota
- KHTB, a radio stations licensed in Provo, Utah (former incarnation)
- WIKS, a radio station licensed in New Bern, North Carolina (former incarnation)
