= WPCK =

Radio station in Denmark–Green Bay, Wisconsin

Coordinates: 44.488°N 87.761°W

- Denmark, Wisconsin; United States
- Broadcast area: Green Bay, Wisconsin
- Frequency: 104.9 MHz
- Branding: K-Love

Programming
- Format: Contemporary Christian
- Affiliations: K-Love

Ownership
- Owner: Educational Media Foundation
- Sister stations: WPFF

History
- First air date: 1969 (as WKAU-FM)
- Former call signs: WKAU-FM (1969–1986); WKAU (1986–1990); WKFX (1990–1997)
- Call sign meaning: Packer Country (reflecting the branding used in its 1990s simulcast with WPKR)

Technical information
- Licensing authority: FCC
- Facility ID: 119
- Class: C3
- ERP: 10,000 watts directional
- HAAT: 157 meters

Links
- Public license information: Public file; LMS
- Webcast: Listen Live
- Website: klove.com

WPCK (104.9 FM) is a radio station licensed to Denmark, Wisconsin and serving Green Bay. The station is owned and operated by Educational Media Foundation. WPCK's transmitter is located off Finger Road in Montpelier.

== History ==
WPCK's former logo as "Kicks 104.9" (2003–2011)

The station was previously known in the 1970s and 1980s as Top 40 station WKAU-FM (licensed to Kaukauna), but became oldies-formatted WKFX by 1990. In an eleven–station channel swap, including moving Sheboygan's 97.7 frequency to Lomira, the frequency landed east of Green Bay. On April 10, 1997, an ownership change saw the station become WPCK, simulcasting its Oshkosh sister station WPKR ("Packer Country", never licensed or sanctioned by the NFL team). Both stations would eventually be acquired by Cumulus Media, who would break off the simulcast in November 2003, with WPCK keeping a country format but adopting its own identity, "Kicks 104.9." In 2009, Clear Channel Communications would acquire WPCK and four other Green Bay area stations owned by Cumulus as part of an ownership swap for two Ohio stations that went from Clear Channel to Cumulus; Cumulus, as part of the deal, continued to operate WPCK; in August 2013, Clear Channel reached a deal to sell its Green Bay stations back to Cumulus. The sale was consummated on December 31, 2013 at a price of $17,636,643.

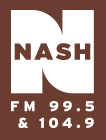
Logo as Nash FM, 2013-2018; the logo from 2018-2019 is similar, but does not include 99.5.

In June 2011, WPCK would reunite with WPKR in a simulcast, branded as "99.5 and 104.9 The Wolf," incorporating new and existing elements from both stations. The "Wolf" branding would give way on May 24, 2013 to the new branding of "Nash FM, 99.5 and 104.9;" WPCK and WPKR were two of six Cumulus country stations to adopt the "Nash FM" branding that day, part of Cumulus' plan to nationally expand its multimedia "Nash FM" country branding, which was launched earlier in 2013 at its New York City station, WNSH. Cumulus Media filed for bankruptcy protection in early 2018.

On March 27, 2018, WPCK and three other Cumulus stations (WTOD/Toledo, OH, KJMO/Jefferson City, MO, and WNUQ/Albany, GA) were placed into the Cumulus Reorganization Divestiture Trust for a future sale. KJMO's sister station KZJF's license was surrendered by Cumulus prior to the trust receiving the assets. Shortly after this, the simulcast between WPCK and WPKR was broken. While both stations retained the country format and "Nash FM" branding, the stations began airing separate programming and separate airstaffs.

On October 17, 2019, Cumulus announced it would sell WPCK to the Educational Media Foundation, the owner of the K-Love and Air1 CCM networks, for $512,000. EMF already owns WPFF (90.5) in the market, which carries K-Love; the acquisition of WPCK would possibly allow both networks over-the-air distribution in Green Bay. The station would be converted to a non-commercial educational station as part of the transaction.

Ahead of the closure of the sale to EMF, WPCK dropped the country format on November 1 at midnight, and began stunting with Christmas music as "Christmas 104.9". The stunt lasted until just before Midnight on December 31, 2019, when Andy Williams' "It's The Most Wonderful Time of the Year" led into Carrie Underwood's rendition of "The Star-Spangled Banner" and a farewell message advising listeners to turn to WPKR before going silent.

On January 8, 2020, WPCK returned to the air with EMF's "K-Love" Contemporary Christian format, giving it coverage with WPFF throughout the entire market.
