= List of New Orleans Saints broadcasters =

The New Orleans Saints' flagship radio stations are WWL AM 870 and WWL-FM 105.3. WWL 870 is a 50,000 watt clear channel station, the most powerful in New Orleans. The radio network has affiliates in numerous cities around Louisiana, Mississippi and Arkansas.

== Current staff ==
Mike Hoss (play-by-play), Deuce McAllister (color commentator), and Jeff Nowak (sideline reporter) form the broadcast team. Former Saints quarterback Bobby Hebert hosts the post-game call-in show, "The Point After," and also performs pre-game and halftime commentary.

== Past Staff ==
Veteran sportscaster Al Wester served as the Saints' play-by-play announcer during its first four seasons (1967–1970). Longtime announcer Jim Henderson has led the broadcast team almost continuously since the mid-1980s, his tenure covering the franchise's periods of greatest success. Henderson announced his retirement following the 2017 season. One week later, Wester died at age 93.

Over the years, color commentators have included such notable former Saints players as quarterback Archie Manning, wide receiver Danny Abramowicz, and running backs Jim Taylor, Hokie Gajan, and Deuce McAllister.

Seasons	Flagship station	Play-by-play	Color commentator	Sideline reporter	Ref.
1967–1968	WWL	Al Wester	Maury Magill		
1969–1970	WWL	Al Wester	Jim Taylor		
1971–1972	WWL	Bill McColgan	Jim Taylor		
1973–1975	WWL	John Ferguson	Steve Stonebreaker		
1976	WGSO	Wayne Mack	Dick Butkus (Weeks 1–8); Archie Manning (Weeks 9–14)		
1977–1981	WGSO	Wayne Mack	Danny Abramowicz		
1982–1984	WWL	Larry Matson	Jim Henderson		
1985	WWL	Larry Matson	Jim Henderson (Weeks 1–6); Jim Henderson & Archie Manning (Weeks 7–16)		
1986–1989	WWL	Jim Henderson	Archie Manning		
1990	WWL	John Ferguson	Archie Manning		
1991	WWL	Larry Matson	Archie Manning		
1992	WQUE	David Garrett	Jim Henderson & Archie Manning		
1993	WQUE	David Garrett (Weeks 1–11); Jim Henderson (Weeks 12–18)	Jim Henderson & Archie Manning (Weeks 1–11); Archie Manning (Weeks 12–18)		
1994	WQUE	Jim Henderson	Archie Manning		
1995–1997	WWL	Jim Henderson	Archie Manning		
1998–1999	WWL	Jim Henderson	Stan Brock	Kenny Wilkerson	
2000–2007	WWL	Jim Henderson	Hokie Gajan	Kenny Wilkerson	
2008–2009	WWL	Jim Henderson	Hokie Gajan	Gus Kattengel	
2010–2014	WWL	Jim Henderson	Hokie Gajan	Kristian Garic	
2015	WWL	Jim Henderson	Hokie Gajan (Weeks 1–13); Deuce McAllister (Weeks 14–17)	Kristian Garic	
2016–2017	WWL	Jim Henderson	Deuce McAllister	Kristian Garic	
2018–2020	WWL	Zach Strief	Deuce McAllister	Steve Geller	
2021-2022	WWL	Mike Hoss	Deuce McAllister	Steve Geller	
2023–present	WWL	Mike Hoss	Deuce McAllister	Jeff Nowak	
