= Magdalena Ribbing =

Swedish writer, journalist, etiquette expert and lecturer

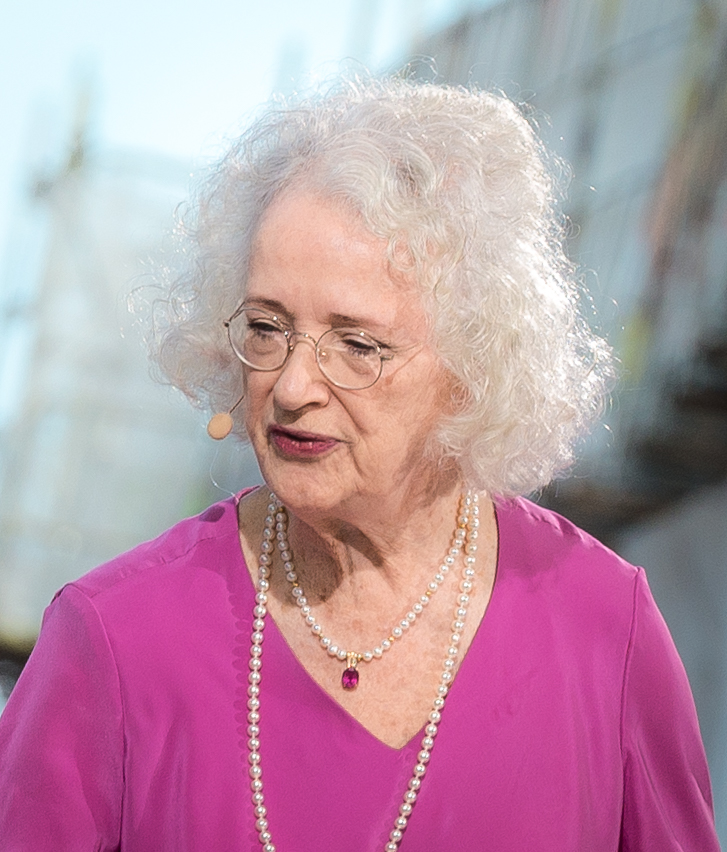
- Ribbing in 2015
- Born: Magdalena Ribbing; 30 July 1940; Oscar Parish, Stockholm Sweden
- Died: 29 September 2017 (aged 77); Oscar Parish, Stockholm Sweden
- Occupations: Journalist, writer
- Spouse: Thomas Hempel (m. 1981)
- Parents: Pehr Ribbing (father); Lilian Thiel (mother)
- Family: Ribbing

Magdalena Ribbing (30 July 1940 – 29 September 2017) was a Swedish writer, journalist, etiquette expert and lecturer. She married radio journalist Thomas Hempel in 1981.

== Career ==
Ribbing belonged to the noble Ribbing family, whose history can be dated back to the 900s. She wrote a book about her family history, and made a documentary about the killer of King Gustav III, her ancestor Adolph Ludvig Ribbing.

Between 1970 and 2000, Ribbing worked, as a political reporter for Dagens Nyheter, and from 1993 until 1999 she was the editor in chief of the Namn & nytt department of the paper. Ribbing was a "Sommarpratare" (Summer Presenter) on the Sveriges Radio show Sommar i P1 twice, on 13 June 1994 and 21 June 2000.

In the Dagens Nyheter newspaper, she wrote a column answering questions about etiquette, manners and style. She also wrote fifteen books about the subject, published by Bokförlag DN, Forum and Natur & Kultur.

She was the opening speaker at Stockholm Pride in 2010.

On 29 September 2017, she died after a fall in her home.

== Bibliography ==
- 1969 – Smycken : ädla stenar, pärlor, guld, silver och platina
- 1984 – Smyckeboken
- 1985 – Etikettboken : allt man behöver veta för att kunna strunta i (along with Sighsten Herrgård)
- 1989 – Festboken : med kalasetikett (along with Alexandra Charles)
- 1991 – Nya etikettboken : spelregler för väluppfostrade
- 1992 – Lilla etikettboken : rätt och vänligt sätt för trevliga barn
- 1995 – Ätten Ribbing : 700 år i Sveriges historia
- 1996 – Smycken & silver för tsarer, drottningar och andra
- 1997 – Nya etikettboken : spelregler för väluppfostrade
- 1998 – Det judiska Stockholm, co-writer
- 2000 – Stora Etikettboken : hyfs, umgängeskonst och ytlig bildning
- 2000 – Smycken & silver för tsarer, drottningar och andra
- 2001 – Det går an! frågor och svar om modern etikett
- 2002 – Ja! : allt om bröllop : från frieri till morgongåva
- 2002 – Kärleksfullt från Parma: människorna, maten, traditionerna (along with Anna Maria Corazza Bildt)
- 2003 – Hålla tal : välkomsttal, tacktal, festtal, hyllningstal, bröllopstal
- 2004 – Ja! : allt om bröllop : från frieri till morgongåva
- 2005 – Nya Stora Etikettboken
- 2006 – Den vackre kungamördaren Adolph Ludvig Ribbing. Om en särdeles man och hans samtida åren 1765–1843
- 2008 – Snabbetikett
- 2008 – Hålla tal (nyskriven utgåva)
- 2008 – Det dukade bordet
- 2009 – Bröllopsboken
- 2009 – Bra att veta för alla unga, lätt om vett och etikett
- 2010 – Ringar – trohet, tillhörighet, glädje
- 2011 – Etikett på jobbet – bra att veta på kontoret
- 2013 – Stora stunder – Etikett för fest och högtid
