= Russian Blood =

Studio album by Ribs
- Released: 29 May 2012
- Genre: Space rock, indie rock, grime
- Label: Arbitrary

Ribs chronology
Locarian Singles (2011)	Russian Blood (2012)

Singles from Russian Blood
- 1. "Alarms" Released: May 28, 2012

Professional ratings
Review scores
Source	Rating
AllMusic	4/5 stars
DIY	8/10
The Bomber Jacket	Positive

Russian Blood is the first studio album by the space rock trio Ribs. It was released on May 29, 2012, by Arbitrary Music Group.

== Track listing ==
No.	Title	Length
1.	"Mercury"	2:02
2.	"Kiss"	4:05
3.	"Gateway Drug"	3:42
4.	"Alarms"	5:09
5.	"I Don't Think"	3:00
6.	"This Is Real"	1:21
7.	"Destructo"	6:47
