= À Propos =

À Propos (French for By the Way) was a Canadian radio program, which aired from 1988 to 2018. Airing Sunday afternoons on CBC Radio 2, and repeated Saturday nights on CBC Radio One, the program presented songs and other music performed in French of Canadian and international origins for English-speaking audiences.

Hosted by Jim Corcoran, a fluently bilingual Quebec musician, this show first aired on November 5, 1988. Its first episode focused on the music of Québécois rock icon Robert Charlebois.

To aid in listener comprehension of the music, Corcoran would often recite an English translation of a song's lyrics. The idea to present translations of lyrics into English was suggested to Corcoran by the show's long time producer and recording engineer Frank Opolko. Opolko also encouraged including interviews with musicians; interviews over the years have included Charlebois, Michel Rivard, Daniel Lavoie, Caracol, Louis-Jean Cormier, Matthieu Chedid and Jane Birkin.

Corcoran announced his retirement from the program in August 2018. It was replaced on the CBC Radio schedule by C'est formidable!, a similar show hosted by musician Florence K.
