= Jim Corcoran =

Jim Corcoran OC
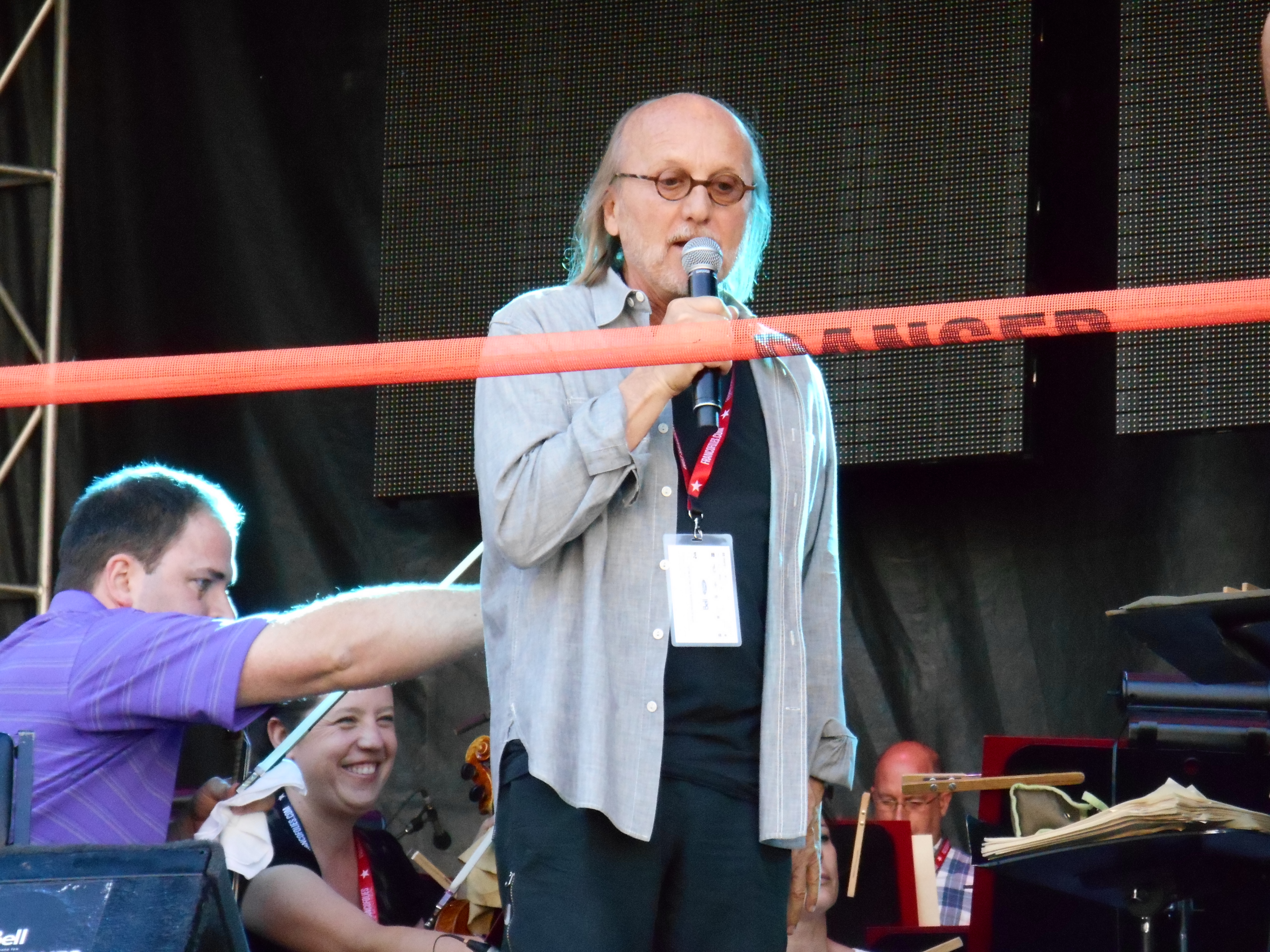
- Montreal, 22 June 2014

Background information
- Born: James Ashley Corcoran; 10 February 1949 (age 77); Sherbrooke, Quebec
- Genres: Folk; Quebec Folk; Pop
- Occupations: musician, radio host
- Instruments: Vocals, guitar
- Years active: 1971–present
- Label: Audiogram
- Formerly of: Jim et Bertrand

James Ashley Corcoran OC (born 10 February 1949 in Sherbrooke, Quebec) is a Canadian singer-songwriter and former broadcaster.

== Biography ==
Jim Corcoran was born in Sherbrooke, but went to high school and obtained his B.A. in Boston, Massachusetts in the late 1960s. The former seminarian returned to his native Quebec in 1970 with the idea to continue his studies at Bishop's University in Lennoxville before becoming a Latin professor. Corcoran received his B.A. from Bishop's University in 1973. In his free time Corcoran taught himself guitar. His first language is English, but he has spent most of his musical career singing in French.

In 1972, he formed the duo Jim et Bertrand with Bertrand Gosselin and they began performing in the Eastern Townships. During the 1970s, the group was associated with Quebec folk music. Corcoran began a solo career in francophone music after the group disbanded in 1979.

From 1988 to 2018, Corcoran hosted the CBC Radio program À Propos, a program presenting the francophone popular music scene of Quebec, Canada and the world to the English network's audience. After producer Frank Opolko suggested that Corcoran provide English translations of some of Quebec's most popular songs, the show started to find a large English audience. After announcing his retirement from broadcasting, he hosted the final episode of À Propos on 2 September 2018; the following week, a new program C'est formidable!, hosted by Florence Khoriaty, made its debut. It is produced and recorded by Frank Opolko.

He wrote music for Cirque du Soleil's productions KÀ, Quidam and Wintuk. "Let Me Fall", a song Corcoran co-wrote with Benoît Jutras for Quidam, was recorded by Josh Groban for his self-titled album. Corcoran also portrayed the part of David in performances of the opera Nelligan in 1990.

Bishop's University granted Corcoran an honorary Doctor of Civil Law on 29 October 2004.

== Awards and recognition ==
- 1981: Félix Award: Best folk record, Têtu
- 1984: Spa Festival, Belgium: Best francophone song, "J'ai fait mon chemin seul"
- 1987: Prix CIEL-Raymond Lévesque
- 1990: Félix Award: Best singer-songwriter, Corcoran
- 2006: Juno Award: Francophone Album of the Year, Pages blanches
- 2016: Induction to the Canadian Songwriters Hall of Fame for his song, "J'ai la tête en gigue"
- 2022: Order of Canada, with the rank of Officer.

== Discography ==
With Bertrand Gosselin (Jim & Bertrand)

- 1972: Jim Corcoran & Bertrand Gosselin
- 1975: Île d'entrée
- 1977: La Tête en Gigue
- 1979: À l'abri de la Tempête

In Solo

- 1981: Têtu
- 1983: Plaisirs
- 1986: Miss Kalabash
- 1990: Corcoran
- 1994: Zola à vélo
- 1996: Portraits
- 2000: Entre tout et moi
- 2005: Pages blanches

== Videography ==
- 1986: Djeddhy Duvah (En chair et en os)
- 1986: Perdus dans le même décor
- 1990: C'est pour ça que je t'aime
- 1990: Ton amour est trop lourd
- 1990: Je me tutoie
- 1990: La Nostalgie
- 1990: Le Boogie
- 1994: L'Amour n'est pas éternel
- 2001: On s'est presque touché
- 2001: J'vais changer le monde
- 2002: Mme Poupart
- 2005: Éloge du doute
- 2007: Docteur Gamache
