= Rib (disambiguation) =

A rib is a bone attached to the spine, in vertebrate animals.

Rib, ribs or RIB may also refer to:

== Anatomy ==
- Rib or costa, the leading edge of an insect wing (see Glossary of entomology terms)
- Rib, an angulated vertical line on the stem of cactus

== Construction ==
- Rib (aeronautics), internal parts of an aircraft wing
- Rib (nautical), a structural member of a vessel
- Rib, separating panels of an architectural rib vault
- The sides of a violin or a guitar

== Acronyms ==
- Rigid inflatable boat (RIB)
- Routing information base in computer networking
- RIB Software, a German company
- Retirement Insurance Benefits of the US Social Security Administration
- Rwanda Investigation Bureau, law enforcement
- Renault Industrie Belgique
- Compaq Remote Insight Board expansion card, later HP Integrated Lights-Out

== Music ==
- R.I.B. (album), 2014, by German metal band Tankard
- Ribs (band) an American space rock/grime band
- "Ribs" (song), 2013, by Lorde
- Rest in Bass (Album), 2025, by American rapper Che

== Other uses ==
- Ribs (food), the cooked meat and rib bones of a food animal
- Rib (professional wrestling), a practical joke
- A type of escarpment seen in rib and groove topography
- Ribbing, a knitting stitch pattern
- Ribs (recordings), gramophone recordings made from X-ray films
- Ribs Raney (1923–2003), American baseball pitcher nicknamed "Ribs"
