= Vojtěch Lindaur =

Czech journalist, teacher, and record producer (1957–2018)

Vojtěch Lindaur (12 September 1957 – 8 January 2018) was a Czech journalist, teacher and record producer.

He was born in Plzeň and studied in Mělník. In 1981, he graduated from Charles University in Prague. In 1987, he produced Doba ledová by Precedens, their debut album. Since 1990, he was working for Rock & Pop magazine. He also had his own radio show (Beatová klenotnice) on Radio Beat.

Lindaur died in January 2018 at age of 60.
