= KBBM =

Coordinates: 38.524°N 92.407°W

- Jefferson City, Missouri; United States
- Broadcast area: Columbia and Vicinity
- Frequency: 100.1 MHz
- Branding: Nash FM 100.1

Programming
- Format: Country
- Affiliations: Westwood One

Ownership
- Owner: Cumulus Media; (Cumulus Licensing LLC)
- Sister stations: KBXR, KFRU, KLIK, KOQL, KPLA

History
- First air date: 1974 (as KJMO)
- Former call signs: KJMO (1974–2003)

Technical information
- Licensing authority: FCC
- Facility ID: 68148
- Class: C2
- ERP: 33,000 watts
- HAAT: 183 meters (600 ft)

Links
- Public license information: Public file; LMS
- Webcast: Listen live Listen Live via iHeart
- Website: nashfm100.com

KBBM (100.1 FM) is a radio station with a country music format. Licensed to Jefferson City, Missouri, the station serves the Mid Missouri area. This station is owned by Cumulus Media.

== History ==
=== Easy listening (1974–1978) ===
100.1 FM KJMO originally signed on the air as an easy-listening/beautiful music formatted station. Live announcers played a mix of taped music and easy listening album tracks from studios on South Ten Mile Drive that had formerly been a residence.

=== Top 40 (1978–1992) ===
After a change in management, 100.1 FM in Jefferson City KJMO became J-100, a semi-automated and semi-live Top 40, Rock and Popular Music station and Jefferson City's original 24-hour a day radio station, as KLIK, KJFF (KTXY) and KWOS all signed off around midnight until the early 1980s.

=== Oldies (1992–1998) ===
The station changed formats to oldies in 1992, keeping the KJMO call letters.

=== Adult contemporary (1998–1999) ===
In 1998, the station changed formats to adult contemporary, using the name "Kiss FM."

=== Classic Hits (1999–2003) ===
In 1999, the station changed formats to Classic Hits. Featured Mornings with John Boy and Billy.

KJMO logo circa 2003 prior to format, and call letter changes

=== Modern rock (2003–2013) ===
In 2003, the station changed formats to modern rock and its call letters to KBBM. The station's name was "The Buzz," which was previously used on 98.3 FM. The station aired the syndicated Mancow show in morning drive.

=== Sports (2013) ===
KBBM changed their format to sports and was then branded as "Sports Radio 100.1 The Fan". Most programming from this period came from CBS Sports Radio.

=== Country (2013–present) ===
On October 5 that same year, the station began simulcasting on the previously country-formatted KZJF 104.1 FM, in a process of moving the sports format to KZJF's weaker signal. On the 7th, The Fan moved to 104.1 as 100.1 began stunting with Christmas music as "Santa 100.1". At 10:01 am on the 8th, the station flipped to country, branded as "100.1 Nash FM" much like other Cumulus-owned country music stations. This is now the second station owned by Cumulus to launch "Nash FM" as a new format rather than just renaming the station, the first being WNSH in New York. This can also be considered a format switch with 104.1.
