= KFRU =

Coordinates: 38°57′52″N 92°18′26″W

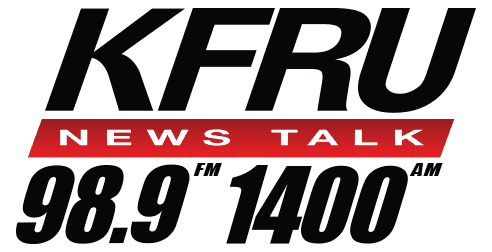
- Columbia, Missouri; United States
- Broadcast area: Columbia and Vicinity
- Frequency: 1400 kHz
- Branding: KFRU News Talk 1400 AM 98.9 FM

Programming
- Format: News–talk
- Affiliations: ABC News Radio; NBC News Radio; Westwood One

Ownership
- Owner: Cumulus Media; (Cumulus Licensing LLC)
- Sister stations: KBBM, KBXR, KJMO, KLIK, KOQL, KPLA

History
- First air date: January 1925

Technical information
- Licensing authority: FCC
- Facility ID: 12396
- Class: C
- Power: 1,000 watts
- Translator: 98.9 K255DJ (Columbia)

Links
- Public license information: Public file; LMS
- Webcast: Listen Live
- Website: www.kfru.com

KFRU (1400 AM) is a radio station located in Columbia, Missouri. Its programming format consists primarily of news, talk and sports. The station is licensed to Cumulus Media. The station is also audible on translator K255DJ 98.9 FM in Columbia.

== History ==
KFRU was founded in Bristow, Oklahoma, by E.H. Rollestone, in January 1925. That fall, the station was purchased by Stephens College and moved to Columbia (with Rollestone going on to found KVOO, now KOTV).

On September 24, 1935, the Federal Communications Commission approved transfer of the station from Nelson R. Darragh, of St. Louis, to Luther L. Hill, of Des Moines. Several owners later, the station was purchased by the St. Louis Star-Times newspaper, mostly for its regional broadcast frequency of 630 kHz, later moved to its St. Louis radio station, KXOK. In 1940, KFRU became an affiliate of the Blue Network. The station was assigned its current 1400 kHz frequency in 1941.

Mahlon Aldridge Jr. was appointed manager in 1945, purchasing the station in 1948 in partnership with the publisher of the Columbia Daily Tribune. In 1957, the station's format consisted of a mixture of country music, news and sports.

Aldridge sold his interest to his partner's son in the 1980s, and competition caused the station's audience share to fall. After another change in ownership, KFRU was purchased by a local ownership group headed by Al Germond, who moved the studios into the broadcast complex with their KARO-FM (now KPLA) station. The group formed and purchased additional stations in the Columbia and Jefferson City markets under the name of Premier Marketing Group.

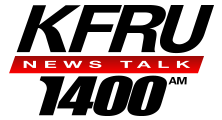
Logo before translator sign on

In 2004, KFRU and the other Premier Marketing Group stations were sold to Cumulus Broadcasting. In August 2017, KFRU applied for an FM translator at 98.9 as part of the FCC's AM revitalization project. The translator signed on for the first time on August 18, 2019.

In August 2026, local programming was eliminated from the station as part of nationwide layoffs by Cumulus Media. "Columbia Morning" host David Gaines (with KFRU since 2008) and "The Morning Meeting" host Simon Rose (with KFRU since 1990) departed.

== Network affiliations ==
=== ABC Radio Network ===
When KFRU was purchased by the Star-Times, it became affiliated with the NBC Blue Network, now the ABC Radio Network. KFRU switched to Westwood One News in 2014. After Westwood One ended their newsfeed, KFRU returned to ABC News Radio on August 31, 2020.

=== Missouri Tiger Network ===
KFRU was the longtime flagship station of play-by-play broadcasts of Missouri Tiger football and basketball teams. On December 22, 2009, Mizzou Sports Properties (owned by Learfield Sports) announced it would move Tiger broadcasts to Zimmer Radio's mid-Missouri cluster, fronted by 99,000-watt KCMQ, starting in 2010.

With KMOX in St. Louis as a network affiliate, the network has had many regional and national broadcasters providing play-by-play and color commentary for MU sports broadcasts, including:

- Jack Buck (member of the Baseball and Radio Hall of Fame)
- Harry Caray (member of the Baseball Hall of Fame)
- Bob Starr
- Bob Costas (NBC Sports)
- Kevin Harlan (CBS Sports)
- Tom Dore (Chicago Bulls)
- Joe Buck (Fox Sports)
- John Rooney (Chicago White Sox, St. Louis Cardinals)
- Bill Wilkerson
- Kellen Winslow (Fox Sports Net) (member of the College Football Hall of Fame and Pro Football Hall of Fame)
- Dan Kelly (member of the Hockey Hall of Fame)
- Jon Sundvold
- Kevin Calabro

Former color commentators include Jim Kennedy and Rod Kelly.

=== St. Louis Cardinals Baseball Network ===
As of the 2012 Major League Baseball season, the station is no longer a St. Louis Cardinals radio network affiliate; Zimmer Radio's KSSZ replaced KFRU as the Columbia market affiliate. According to previous years' KFRU promotional advertisements, they had been affiliated with the Cardinals for at least 60 years.

== Awards ==
- Peabody Award for Public Service by a Small Station, 1940
- Missouri Honor Medal for Distinguished Service in Journalism, presented to Mahlon Aldridge
- KFRU awarded the Missouri Broadcasters Association 2015 Station of the Year award. This was the first ever Station of the Year award given by the MBA.
- KFRU inducted into the Boone County Historical Society's Hall of Fame, October 8, 2015, just days after the station's 90th Anniversary.

== Affiliation with the University of Missouri School of Journalism ==
Prior to the founding of university-owned station KBIA-FM in 1971, KFRU was a primary training ground for broadcast journalism students at the university. Even after this time, the station still employs students and recent graduates; many graduates list the station on their current employment biography pages.

== Former KFRU employees in TV/radio ==
- Tom Kennedy (television host) former game show host
- Dan Claxton, news director, 2001-2008 - currently features editor, Washington Missourian
- Eric Engberg, news director, 1963-68 - retired CBS News Washington Correspondent
- Ben Bradley, host, reporter and news anchor - currently WLS-TV general assignment reporter
- Dave Hunziker, sports director - currently Oklahoma State Cowboys play-by-play
- Chris Gervino, sports director - former KOMU-TV sports director
- Will Sterrett, board-op - currently KMBZ-FM morning co-anchor
- Sean Kelley - sports director - currently New Orleans Pelicans play-by-play
- Ed Kilgore - currently WGRZ-TV sports director
- Mike Roberts - currently KRCG-TV chief meteorologist
- Mark Reardon - currently St. Louis area talk show host
- John Carney - host of The Carney Show w/ Julie Buck on KTRS (AM)
- Michael Calhoun - currently KMOX-AM news anchor
- Amy Miller - currently local Morning Edition host at WDET
- Joe Scialfa - currently WTMJ (AM), program director
- Michael Putney, news director - currently WPLG-TV, Miami political reporter
- Steve Moore - currently KMOX-AM, vice president of News/Talk, CBS Radio, director of programming and operations
- Ellen Schenk - currently KMBZ-FM morning co-anchor
- Larry Zimmer - deceased KOA-AM sports director, University of Colorado play-by-play
- Mark Becker - WSOC-TV reporter
- Mark Davidson - KSNW-TV sports anchor/reporter
- Matt Boltz - currently Houston Astros radio network producer/engineer
- Kevin Larue - currently KSL-AM news and program director
- RJ McAllister, news - formerly news director at KWTO
- Jim Fry - WFAA reporter, then Voice of America news manager
- Brian Sussman - currently host at KSFO
- Paul Hannigan, news director - formerly reporter at KTRH-AM
- Darren Hellwege - Host on KBIA-FM, Columbia; formerly of KCSC and WWLS, Oklahoma City.
- Dick (Kettenbrink) Preston - Former Morning and Noon news anchor at KRCG-TV Jefferson City, Mo.

== Other former employees and program hosts ==
- James Keown - state capital reporter and Sunday Morning Roundtable contributor - currently incarcerated in the Commonwealth of Massachusetts after being convicted of murdering his wife by poisoning her with antifreeze. Keown was arrested by the United States Marshals Service in November 2005 during a commercial break on his “Partyline” program on sister-station KLIK in Jefferson City, Mo.
- Roger Gafke, news director
- Scott Baker - former press secretary for Rep. Kenny Hulshof
- Rod Kelly - deceased, Missouri Basketball color commentator
- Kathy Poppe (Watson)- Constituent Service Director, U.S. Senator John Boozman, former talk host/reporter (KWHN - Fort Smith, Arkansas)
- Barry Bennett - Currently Director of Communications for Missouri House of Representatives
- Brian Hauswirth, news director, 93.9 The Eagle and former public information officer with the Missouri Department of Corrections
- Doug Ross
- Dick Aldrich -Radio Communications for Missouri House of Representatives
- Chris Lincoln - co-founder of Winnercomm; ABC Sports and ESPN commentator on Thoroughbred racing; former sports host of KTUL-TV, Tulsa
- Dr. John Williams - host, The Pet Place
- Bob O'Connell - host, The Garden Spot
- Ray Rothenberger - host, The Garden Spot (deceased)
- Stacy Allen - meteorologist
- Brendan Cosgrove - news - currently Broadcast Associate at Northwestern University
- Greg Crain - sports (deceased)
- Leslie Callison - news
- Judd McIlvain - consumer reporter, worked at KRCG, KTTV, KCBS-TV and CBS 48 Hours.
- Ara Ayer - reporter for WAAY-TV; producer for Dateline NBC, NBC Nightly News; conflict photographer: World Picture News; commercial director, DP, filmmaker for PBS, Bloomberg TV
- Anne Steffens - formerly with KMOV, now Director of the Office of Communications of the Archdiocese of St. Louis
- John Fougere, sportscaster - currently associated with William Woods University
- Robert Loggia - actor (deceased)
- Brad Whitworth - sportscaster/announcer - now Sr. Comms Mgr, Strategic Alliances at Cisco Systems
- Kevin M. Gray - sportscaster and sports director - now President of the Kansas City Sports Commission
- Tony Messenger - evening show host; was concurrently a Columnist with the Columbia Daily Tribune - A Pulitzer Prize winner now associated with the St. Louis Post-Dispatch
- Chris Kelly - evening show host; former local and state politician; resigned to accept appointment as Boone County associate circuit judge (retired)
- Mike Kelly - Morning sports reports; Missouri Men's Basketball play-by-play; Left his full-time job as Missouri Athletic Department Director of Broadcast Operations on May 30, 2007, to join The Insurance Group sales department , but will remain as play-by-play announcer. During the David Lile Show on June 29, 2007, it was announced that it was his last day "due to budgetary reasons" with the Cumulus stations (he also provided reports for Jefferson City station KLIK-AM)
- Dave Schmidt - (retired) former Weatherman for KOMU TV in Columbia, Mo.
- Steve Lager- 25 year radio career in Kansas City including mornings at KCIY
- Dusty Rhodes-the Midnight Mayor
- Bob Pollack - Sports Director
- Brad Stephenson - news anchor/reporter
- Richard M. Cottam (deceased) - news anchor/reporter 1957–1963; Instructor Dept. of Journalism Univ. of Missouri- Columbia 1956-1963; Co-host "Conversations with Dick and Doris" 1961–1963; NBC News associate Producer Huntley-Brinkley Report 1963–1967; NBC News Election unit 1968-1971
