= WJST =

Radio station in Sylvester–Albany, Georgia

- Sylvester, Georgia; United States
- Broadcast area: Albany, Georgia
- Frequency: 102.1 MHz
- Branding: Retro FM

Programming
- Format: Classic hits

Ownership
- Owner: JetStream Media LLC; (JetStream Media LLC)

History
- First air date: 2000
- Former call signs: WWSG (1993–2002); WZBN (2002–2006); WQVE (2006); WNUQ (2006–2019); WPFQ (2019–2022)
- Call sign meaning: JetSTream Media

Technical information
- Licensing authority: FCC
- Facility ID: 66942
- Class: A
- ERP: 5,200 watts
- HAAT: 107 meters
- Transmitter coordinates: 31°31′37″N 83°49′30″W

Links
- Public license information: Public file; LMS
- Webcast: Listen live
- Website: retrofmalbany.com

WJST (102.1 FM) is a radio station serving Albany, Georgia Tifton, Georgia and surrounding cities. This station is under ownership of JetStream Media LLC and broadcast a Classic Hits format.

== History ==
From its official launch in March 1999 through most of 2006, WJST (then WNUQ) was on 101.7 MHz and was known as Q101. The entire time it was broadcasting as "Q101" it did so under a single program director, Jason "J.B." Savage. From 2006 to 2014, the station switched to a Top 40/CHR format and branded itself as "Q102" to coincide with moving to its new frequency at 102.1 MHz.

On August 15, 2014, at 3 PM, the then-WNUQ flipped to country, becoming one of the first "Nash Icon" affiliates as "102.1 Nash Icon".

On March 27, 2018, WNUQ and three other Cumulus stations (KJMO, WPCK, and WTOD) were placed into the Cumulus Reorganization Divestiture Trust for a future sale.

On October 17, 2019, Cumulus announced that WNUQ would be sold to Tripp Morgan's organization, Pretoria Fields Collective Media, for $90,000 from the divestiture trust.

On November 20, it was announced through The Albany Herald that the station would rebrand as "Q102 The Queen Bee" under new callsign WPFQ upon closure of the sale; new station manager Tara Dyer Stoyle reported that the plan was to relaunch the station on January 6, 2020, from new studios at Morgan's Pretoria Fields Brewery in downtown Albany.

On November 26, 2019, The Mainstay Trust closed on the sale for WNUQ from Cumulus Media while changing call letters to WPFQ with a format yet to be disclosed.

The Queen Bee was eventually launched on January 27, 2020, with a AAA format. Stoyle described it as "a culmination of hundreds of hours of selecting and loading thousands of songs that were each hand-picked for the listeners." She also listed additional air staffers as including Kenny Mitchell (formerly of WJAD), Nikki Miller (local dj), Carlton Fletcher (a fellow Albany Herald columnist), as well as members of local bands BoDean & The Poachers and This Solid Ground.

On July 1, 2021, Pretoria Fields Collective Media entered into a Local Marketing Agreement with JetStream Media LLC to operate WPFQ. JetStream took Q102 The Queen Bee off the air on July 1, 2021, to make adjustments to the equipment at the WPFQ tower site. On July 2, 2021, at noon, JetStream Media launched WPFQ as a classic hits station, branded as "102.1 Retro FM" playing hits of the 1980s and 1990s. The first song Retro FM played was "Groove Is in the Heart" by Deee-Lite, the very first song that (now owner) John Golobish, Jr. ever played on the air when his career started at WHJB radio in December 1990. On July 8, 2021, JetStream Media filed an Assignment of Authorization with the FCC to purchase WPFQ from Pretoria Fields Collective Media for $100,000. On December 28, 2021, JetStream Media consummated the purchase of WPFQ and changed the callsign to the current WJST effective January 14, 2022.

On January 1, 2023, WJST dropped the "Hits of the 80s and 90s" branding on Retro FM and adopted a more modern Classic Hits format and "Southwest Georgia's Retro Hits" as its slogan, adding music from the 2000s to its playlist of 80s and 90s hits.

On July 9, 2024, WJST moved from its original broadcast tower, on the west side of Sylvester, Georgia, to another tower on the east side of town that gives WJST's broadcast antenna an additional almost 100 feet in height. A new antenna system, transmitter and all-digital wiring were installed, giving WJST a much better sound quality. The additional antenna height greatly improved WJST's signal, especially to its east over the city of Tifton, Georgia, where the previous tower actually blocked the signal from reaching Tifton very well.

== Previous logos ==
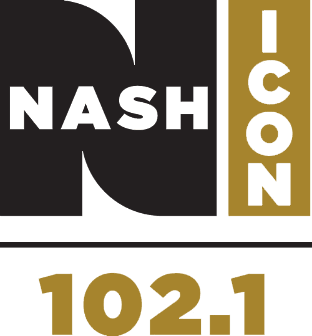
