= Dave Barrett (journalist) =

American radio journalist (1954–2018)

- Born: November 27, 1954; Buffalo, New York, U.S.
- Died: September 19, 2018 (aged 63); Stamford, Connecticut, U.S.
- Education: University of Houston
- Occupation: Broadcasting journalist
- Years active: 1973–2018

David Barrett (November 27, 1954 – September 19, 2018) was an American journalist who worked for Fox News, ABC Radio News, and CBS News for several decades until his death in September 2018. Immediately prior to his death, Barrett was the host of the late edition of the CBS World News Roundup.

== Career and awards ==
Barrett began his career at the University of Houston's KUHF while a student at the university. In a 2015 interview, Barrett described himself as being at the station "ALL the time" while filling various roles from sports play-by-play announcing, sports newscasts, and music host. His work at KUHF led him to being offered an internship at KTRH in the Houston market, which was blocked by William Hawes, who was a supervisor for KUHF at that time. Barrett would wind up working at KTRH over Hawes' objection during the summer of 1974 and be hired as a part-time employee later that year. He would work for several Houston radio stations, including KLOL and KPRC until late 1981.

From Houston, Barrett's career took him from the local level to the national stage with Fox, ABC, and CBS. Barrett also worked for multiple sports franchises in the Houston area, including the Houston Astros, Houston Rockets, Houston Oilers, Houston Aeros, Houston Apollos, and the University of Houston, his alma mater.

In December 1981, Barrett began working for ABC Radio News and would remain with the network for eleven years before moving to ESPN Radio for two years, beginning in December 1992. He returned to ABC in 1994. In December 1998, he moved to Fox News, where he served as news director for Fox News Radio Network before moving to CBS in February 2001.

Barrett covered ten Olympic Games during his career.

During his career spanning from the 1970s until 2018, Barrett won multiple industry awards, including the Edward R. Murrow Award three times.

== Personal life and death ==
Barrett was married and had one son.

On September 19, 2018, he died suddenly at age 63.
