= Bert Nederlof =

Dutch journalist and radio sports commentator (1946–2018)

- Born: 26 August 1946; Rotterdam, Netherlands
- Died: 6 October 2018 (aged 72); Texel, Netherlands
- Occupations: Newspaper reporter, journalist, sports commentator

Bert Nederlof (26 August 1946 – 6 October 2018) was a Dutch journalist and radio sports commentator.

== Life and career ==
Born in Crooswijk, Rotterdam, Nederlof was introduced to football by his grandfather who took him with him to visit local club Excelsior and he remained a club supporter his whole life.

He started his career in journalism with local newspaper De Rotterdammer, where he covered local amateur football. He later worked for Trouw and De Tijd.

=== Voetbal International ===
He joined leading Dutch football magazine Voetbal International in 1973 where he worked as editor, editor-in-chief and senior editor for 35 years. For VI, he covered the 1978 FIFA World Cup in Argentina.

=== NOS ===
As a commentator, Nederlof covered the Netherlands' UEFA Euro 1988 Championship winning tournament and provided commentaries for NOS radio sports programme Langs de Lijn between 1973 and 1995. He was commenting the infamous 1982–83 UEFA Cup match between Spartak Moscow and Dutch club Haarlem which became known as the Luzhniki disaster, and during the 1985 Heysel disaster among others.

== Personal life and Death ==
After his early retirement in 2008 he moved to his beloved Texel where he wrote books about and with Willem van Hanegem, Ronald Koeman, Piet de Visser, Huub Stevens, Leo Beenhakker and Keje Molenaar. He died in October 2018 after a long illness.

== Books ==
- De oceaanvreugde van Marco van Basten, voetbalverhalen (2004)
- Epy Drost, in alles anders (2011)
- Ronald Koeman (2013)
- Drie dolle dagen met De Kromme en andere voetbalverhalen, (2014)
- Helder, van Arsenal naar de bajes (2014)
- Don Leo, het werd stil aan de overkant (2015)
- Huub Stevens, nooit opgeven (2016)
- Meesterscout!, de mooiste ontdekkingen van Piet de Visser (2016)
- Dossier Feyenoord, kampioenschap als obsessie (2016)
- Rob Rensenbrink, het slangenmens (2017)
- Keje Molenaar, meesterlijk (2018)
