= Al Wester =

American sportscaster (1923–2018)

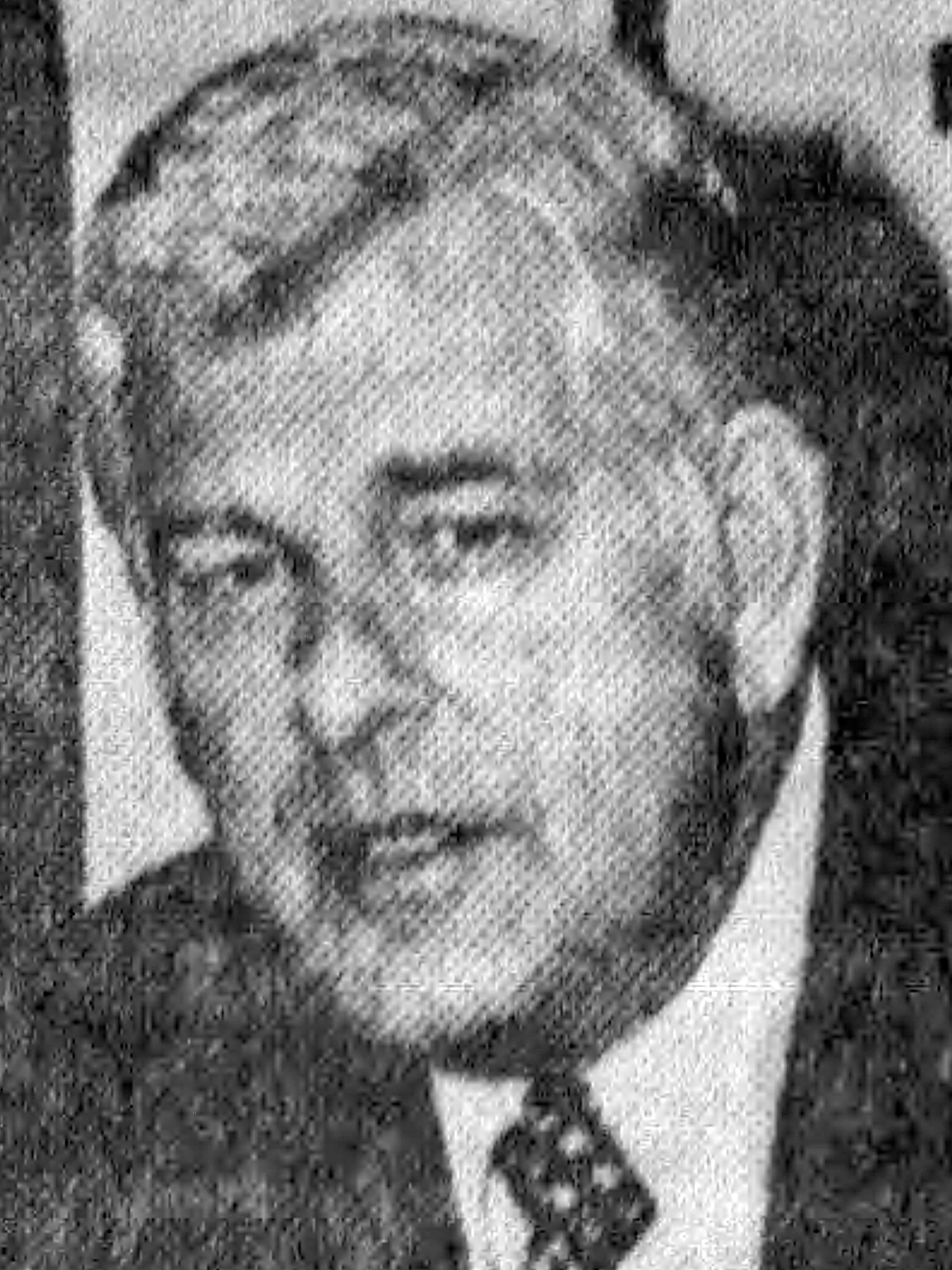
Wester in 1980.

Allan Bennett Wester Sr. (September 15, 1923 – February 7, 2018) was an American sportscaster nationally known for his work with the Mutual Broadcasting System, most notably on Notre Dame Fighting Irish football broadcasts. He was also the original play-by-play voice of the New Orleans Saints.

== New Orleans Saints ==
His most famous call was of Tom Dempsey's then-National Football League (NFL) record 63-yard field goal on the last play of a 19–17 victory over the Detroit Lions at Tulane Stadium on November 8, 1970.

Here’s the snap. The ball is down. And...it is good! It’s good! It’s good! The Saints win! The Saints win! 19-17!
