= Ribs (band) =

American space rock band

RIBS
- Origin: Boston, Massachusetts, United States
- Genres: Space rock, indie rock, grime
- Years active: 2009–2014, 2018–present
- Label: Arbitrary
- Members: Keith Freund; Chris Oquist
- Past members: Justin Tolan; Blake Fusilier
- Website: www.ribstheband.com

Ribs (stylized as RIBS) is an American space rock/grime band based in Boston, Massachusetts. The band is fronted by guitarist and vocalist Keith Freund, while Chris Oquist plays drums. Over the years, the band as developed a DIY-method of recording, mixing and releasing work, releasing all their music on their independent label, Arbitrary Music Group.

Several of the band's singles have been featured in TV shows and movies, although no singles by the band have charted. The first single by the band "Silencer" was featured in the MTV show Teen Mom 2. Their single "Queen of Hearts" was featured in the film Something Wicked.

Their first EP, British Brains, was released June 8, 2010 and was Bandcamp’s #1 rock release on its release week. They released a digital 2-song double A-side single, Locrian Singles on January 25, 2011, which is available for free on Bandcamp. RIBS released their second EP, Russian Blood, on May 29, 2012. Most recently, the band opened for Queens of the Stone Age during the band's final leg of the ...Like Clockwork Tour.

During their career, the band has opened for several notable artists including The Joy Formidable, The Soft Moon, and White Rabbits. In 2012, the band won “Rock Artist of the Year” at the 2012 Boston Music Awards.

After a five-year hiatus, the band returned with their single, "1992", which was released on June 21, 2019. On July 26, 2019, they released their second single, "Too Long".

== Discography ==
=== EPs ===
- British Brains (2010)
- Locrian Singles (2011)

=== Studio albums ===
- Russian Blood (2012)

=== Singles ===
- "Silencer" (2010), featured in Teen Mom 2
- "1992" (2019)
- "Too Long" (2019)
- "Hand" (2020)
