= Thomas Hempel =

Swedish radio journalist (1942–2018)

Thomas Ivar Hempel (28 March 1942 – 7 May 2018) was a Swedish radio journalist. He was affiliated with the Sveriges Radio P1 news service Dagens Eko, specifically its program Lördagsintervjun (The Saturday interview).

== Career ==
From the late 1980s into the mid 1990s, Hempel, along with Inger Arenander, interviewed international political figures for the Saturday program Lördagsintervjun. This led to both journalists being awarded the Stora Journalistpriset in 1988. The monetary award, given annually by the Bonnier Group, recognises achievements in journalism.

== Personal life ==
In 1981, Hempel married etiquette expert Magdalena Ribbing. She died in 2017 of complications from a fall at home. Hempel died on 7 May 2018 at age 76.
