= C'est formidable! =

Canadian radio show

C'est formidable! is a Canadian radio show, which airs Sundays on CBC Music and Saturdays on CBC Radio One. Hosted by Florence Khoriaty, the program airs a selection of French language music from Quebec, France and other francophone countries for the English Canadian audience. The show is produced by Frank Opolko.

The program premiered in 2018 as a replacement for the similar À Propos, after longtime host Jim Corcoran announced his retirement from broadcasting.
