= Black Rock Airport =

- IATA: none; ICAO: none

Summary
- Airport type: Public
- Owner: Pueblo of Zuñi
- Serves: Zuni Pueblo, New Mexico
- Elevation AMSL: 6,454 ft (1,967 m)
- Coordinates: 35°04′59″N 108°47′30″W
- Interactive map of Black Rock Airport

Runways
Direction	Length		Surface
Direction	ft	m	Surface
6/24	4,807	1,465	Asphalt

Statistics (2009)
- Aircraft operations: 110
- Source: Federal Aviation Administration

Black Rock Airport was a public use airport located three nautical miles (6 km) northeast of the central business district of Zuni Pueblo, a pueblo in McKinley County, New Mexico, United States. It was owned by the Pueblo of Zuñi. According to the FAA's National Plan of Integrated Airport Systems for 2009–2013, it was classified as a general aviation airport.

Although many U.S. airports use the same three-letter location identifier for the FAA and IATA, this airport was assigned ZUN by the FAA but had no designation from the IATA (which assigned ZUN to Union Station in Chicago, Illinois).

== Facilities and aircraft ==
Black Rock Airport covered an area of 88 acres (36 ha) at an elevation of 6,454 feet (1,967 m) above mean sea level. It had one runway designated 6/24 with an asphalt surface measuring 4,807 by 50 feet (1,465 x 15 m). For the 12-month period ending March 31, 2009, the airport had 110 aircraft operations: 91% air taxi and 9% general aviation.

== Airport closure ==
On May 2, 2017, the new Andrew Othole Memorial Airport opened 5 miles west of the central business district of Zuni Pueblo. The new airport was the culmination of a 15-year effort to replace the Black Rock Airport. On November 7, 2017, the Black Rock Airport was closed to all traffic except for emergency medical aircraft. On December 11, 2017, the airport was further restricted to allow only emergency medical helicopters. Finally, on February 12, 2018, the airport was permanently closed to all aircraft.

An in-depth history of the Zuni Airport / Black Rock Airport is available on the Abandoned & Little-Known Airfields website.
