= KBXR =

Coordinates: 39.014°N 92.276°W

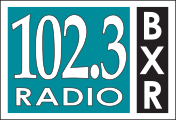
- Columbia, Missouri; United States
- Broadcast area: Columbia, Missouri
- Frequency: 102.3 MHz
- Branding: 102.3 BXR

Programming
- Format: Adult album alternative

Ownership
- Owner: Cumulus Media; (Cumulus Licensing LLC)
- Sister stations: KBBM, KFRU, KPLA, KOQL

History
- First air date: November 11, 1994 (as KOQL)
- Former call signs: KNCD (1992–1994); KOQL (1994–1997)
- Call sign meaning: K(C)olumBia's XRT

Technical information
- Licensing authority: FCC
- Facility ID: 47910
- Class: C3
- ERP: 3,500 watts
- HAAT: 261 meters (856 ft)

Links
- Public license information: Public file; LMS
- Webcast: Listen live Listen Live via iHeart
- Website: bxr.com

KBXR (102.3 FM), often referred to simply as BXR, is a local radio station located on Old Highway 63 in Columbia, Missouri. It airs an adult album alternative format with a mixture of alternative rock, classic rock, and more.

== Features ==
102-3 BXR interviews bands or singers playing in the city's various locations. These interviews are conducted "Live In Studio X." Past Studio X guests include Joe Strummer of The Clash, Big Head Todd and the Monsters, Dave Matthews, Wilco, and Sheryl Crow (who attended the University of Missouri in Columbia). In 2005, KBXR released a CD compilation of songs recorded at the station, called Live from Studio X. Proceeds from the CD sales went to the Central Missouri Humane Society. The station released a second CD in December 2008 called Live from Studio X, Volume 2. The proceeds from this project go to Boys and Girls Town of Missouri.

Annually, during Thanksgiving and about a week after, BXR has a "B to X" special event where the station airs its entire song library alphabetically with no repeats starting with song titles that begin with the letter B and ending with song titles that begin with the letter X. Many lesser-known songs by various popular bands and singers are aired right along with more popular chart-toppers. Also, this event allows various versions of the same song that have been remixed or remade to be heard back-to-back since the songs are spelled the same alphabetically.

== History ==
The station began broadcasting on November 11, 1994. It held the call sign KOQL and aired an oldies format. In September 1997, the station swapped formats and call signs with 106.1 KBXR, and it adopted its present AAA format. Its Adult Album Alternative (AAA) format originated on 106.1 FM on October 15, 1993. The first song was played at 1:06 pm and was R.E.M.'s "It's The End Of The World As We Know It".

102.3 BXR has had a long list of notable entertainers play for the annual birthday party at The Blue Note.

In August 2026, afternoon DJ Simon Rose departed in a round of national layoffs by Cumulus Media. Rose had been with BXR since its launch in 1993, holding down various air shifts. Midday host Emily Larkin was also laid off. In November 2026, morning host Mo Louis was also laid off by Cumulus after a 32-year run at the station. The majority of the station's programming is now automated.
