= Radio Beat =

Czech radio station

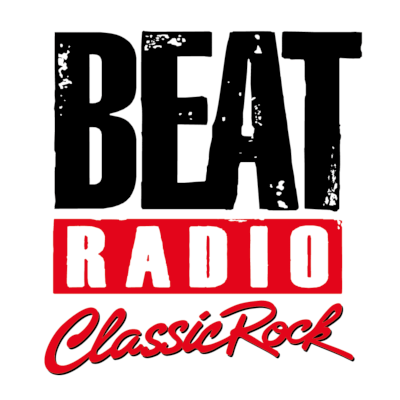
- Czech Republic
- Frequencies: FM: 95.3 MHz (Prague), various in the whole country

Programming
- Language: Czech

Ownership
- Owner: Radio United Broadcasting s.r.o.

History
- First air date: 1 January 2002

Links
- Website: www.radiobeat.cz

Radio Beat is a Czech radio station, broadcasting from Prague. It plays classic rock. There is thematic program every weekend. There is a program after 7:00 pm Every day. Radio Beat started broadcasting on 1 January 2002.

== Programme ==
Radio Beat has regular schedule every week.

Monday: 19:00 – 20:00 "Beatová klenotnice" (Beat's treasury) – "Untraditionally chart of Rock delicatessen" Tuesday: 19:00 – 20:00 "Kalumet strýčka indiána" – Interview with interesting people Wednesday: 19:00 – 20:00 "Uši Rádia Beat" (Ears of Radio Beat) – Moderator playing songs to his guests and they must guess Artist Thursday: 19:00 – 20:00 "Svěženky a machři" – Programme about new bands and their ideals. Playing new and old songs Friday: 19:00 – 22:00 "Větrník" (Weathercock) – "Talkshow" with Jaromir Tuma and Honza Hamernik Saturday: 19:00 – 23:00 "Rocková pípa" (Rock's faucet) – Every Saturday is on Radio Beat's Garden little inn and you can go there and wish song. Sunday: 20:00 – 0:00 "Hard & Heavy" – Programme about extreme ways in Rock music

Every Tuesday and Thursday: 23:00 – 0:00 "Půlnoční album" (Midnight album) – On web pages of Radio Beat, users can choose from six albums, and the two with the most votes will be all played.

== 100 albums in 100 days ==
- 1. The Beatles - White Album
- 2. Van Halen - 5150
- 3. Frank Zappa - Sheik Yerbouti
- 4. Deep Purple - In Rock
- 5. Bruce Springsteen - Born in the U.S.A.
- 6. Joe Satriani - Crystal Planet
- 7. Vladimír Mišík - Strihali dohola maleho chlapecka
- 8. Lynyrd Skynyrd - Second Helping (Remastred)
- 9. David Bowie - Ziggy Stardust
- 10. Alice Cooper - Billion Dollar Babies
- 11. Yes - Close to the Edge
- 12. Bob Dylan - Highway 61 Revisited
- 13. Helloween - Keeper of the Seven Keys: Part I
- 14. Blue Effect - Svět hledačů
- 15. Def Leppard - Pyromania
- 16. Mike Oldfield - Tubular Bells
- 17. Uriah Heep - Look At Yourself
- 18. Talking Heads - Little Creatures
- 19. UFO - Lights Out
- 20. Creedence Clearwater Revival - Willy And The Poor Boys
- 21. Jeff Beck - Blow by Blow
- 22. Katapult - 2006
- 23. King Crimson - In the Court of the Crimson King
- 24. Red Hot Chili Peppers - Blood Sugar Sex Magik
- 25. Fermata - Huascaran
- 26. Guns N' Roses - Appetite For Destruction
- 27. Electric Light Orchestra - A New World Record
- 28. Whitesnake - Whitesnake
- 29. Dream Theater - Metropolis Pt. 2: Scenes from a Memory
- 30. Bachman–Turner Overdrive - Not Fragile
- 31. Dire Straits - Brothers in Arms
- 32. Eagles - Hotel California
- 33. Jiří Schelinger - Hrrr... na ne
- 34. Janis Joplin - Pearl
- 35. King Diamond - Abigail
- 36. Midnight Oil - Diesel and Dust
- 37. Kiss - Dynasty
- 38. Lou Reed - Coney Island Baby
- 39. Mötley Crüe - Shout at the Devil
- 40. Luboš Pospíšil - Tenhle vitr jsem mel rad
- 41. U2 - The Joshua Tree
- 42. ZZ Top - Eliminator
- 43. Tři sestry - Na Kovarne, To Je Narez
- 44. Led Zeppelin - Led Zeppelin IV
- 45. The Clash - London Calling
- 46. Free - Highway
- 47. Genesis - The Lamb Lies Down on Broadway
- 48. The Who - Who's Next
- 49. Jethro Tull - Aqualung
- 50. Jimi Hendrix - Are You Experienced
- 51. Aerosmith - Toys in the Attic
- 52. Pink Floyd - The Dark Side of the Moon
- 53. The Guess Who - American Woman
- 54. The Doors - The Doors
- 55. Nirvana - Nevermind
- 56. Sex Pistols - Never Mind the Bollocks Here's the Sex Pistols
- 57. Black Sabbath - Paranoid
- 58. Simon and Garfunkel - Bridge Over Troubled Water
- 59. AC/DC - Back in Black
- 60. The Police - Synchronicity
- 61. Metallica - Metallica
- 62. The Byrds - Mr. Tambourine Man
- 63. Green Day - American Idiot
- 64. Collegium Musicum - Konvergencie
- 65. Motörhead - Ace of Spades
- 66. Focus - Mowing Waves
- 67. Krausberry - Na větvi
- 68. Pearl Jam - Ten
- 69. Supertramp - Breakfast In America
- 70. Thin Lizzy - Jailbreak
- 71. Eric Clapton -Slowhand
- 72. Gary Moore - Still Got the Blues
- 73. Iron Maiden - The Number of The Beast
- 74. Marillion - Misplaced Childhood
- 75. Framus Five - Kolej Yesterday
- 76. Nazareth - Razamanaz
- 77. Manowar - Fighting The World
- 78. Neil Young - Harvest
- 79. Judas Priest - British Steel
- 80. Omega - 10 000 lépés
- 81. Ozzy Osbourne - Ozzmosis
- 82. Peter Gabriel - So
- 83. Queen - A Night at the Opera
- 84. Rainbow - Rising
- 85. Rolling Stones - Sticky Fingers
- 86. Rush - Moving Pictures
- 87. Santana - Abraxas
- 88. Scorpions - Crazy World
- 89. Slade - Slade Alive!
- 90. Ten Years After - Stonedhenge
- 91. Visací zámek - Start 02
- 92. Accept - Metal Heart
- 93. Bad Company - Bad Company
- 94. Crosby, Stills, Nash & Young - Déjà Vu
- 95. Emerson, Lake & Palmer - Tarkus
- 96. Grand Funk Railroad - We're an American Band
- 97. Patti Smith - Horses
- 98. The Plastic People of the Universe - Hovězí porážka
- 99. Queensrÿche - Operation: Mindcrime
- 100. Progres 2 - Dialog s vesmírem
