= KOQL =

Radio station in Ashland–Columbia, Missouri

- Ashland, Missouri; United States
- Broadcast area: Columbia; Jefferson City
- Frequency: 106.1 MHz
- Branding: Q 106.1

Programming
- Format: Contemporary hit radio
- Affiliations: Westwood One

Ownership
- Owner: Cumulus Media; (Cumulus Licensing LLC)
- Sister stations: KBBM; KBXR; KFRU; KPLA

History
- First air date: 1993
- Former call signs: KYUA (1991–1994); KBXR (1994–1997)

Technical information
- Licensing authority: FCC
- Facility ID: 60731
- Class: C1
- ERP: 69,000 watts
- HAAT: 292 meters (958 ft)
- Transmitter coordinates: 38°45′1.1″N 92°33′31.7″W

Links
- Public license information: Public file; LMS
- Webcast: Listen live
- Website: www.q1061.com

KOQL (106.1 FM, "Q 106.1") is a contemporary hit radio station licensed to Columbia, Missouri and owned by Cumulus Media, and serving the Mid-Missouri area. Its transmitter is located about 20 miles west of Jefferson City.

== Station history ==
KOQL launched as KBXR with an Adult Album Alternative (AAA) format on October 15, 1993.

In September 1997, it traded formats with 102.3 FM and became KOQL "Kool 106" with an oldies format. By 2000, the station had shifted to a jammin' oldies format. In September 2001, it flipped to CHR as "Q 106.1."

On March 25, 2003, during The Cosmo & JC Radio Show, KOQL broadcast a prank phone call to a gambling addiction hotline without informing the counselor that the conversation was being recorded for broadcast. This violated 47 C.F.R. § 73.1206|Section 73.1206 of the FCC rules. Mid-Missouri Broadcasting apologized on-air on April 4, 2003. The FCC issued a $4,000 fine the following year.

At the time, the station was owned by Mid-Missouri Broadcasting, Inc. The local cluster (including KOQL) later operated under the Premier Marketing Group name before being sold to Cumulus Media (Cumulus assumed operations March 1, 2004).
