= KPLA =

Coordinates: 39.014°N 92.276°W

- Columbia, Missouri; United States
- Broadcast area: Columbia/Jefferson City, Missouri
- Frequency: 101.5 MHz
- Branding: 101.5 KPLA

Programming
- Format: Adult contemporary
- Affiliations: Compass Media Networks; Westwood One

Ownership
- Owner: Cumulus Media; (Cumulus Licensing LLC)
- Sister stations: KBBM, KBXR, KFRU, KOQL

History
- First air date: February 1983; 43 years ago (as KARO at 101.7)
- Former call signs: KARO (1982–1994)
- Former frequencies: 101.7 MHz (1983–1994)

Technical information
- Licensing authority: FCC
- Facility ID: 12429
- Class: C1
- ERP: 41,000 watts
- HAAT: 324 meters

Links
- Public license information: Public file; LMS
- Webcast: Listen live Listen Live via iHeart
- Website: kpla.com

KPLA (101.5 FM) refers to a Cumulus radio station in Columbia, Missouri. KPLA first started out as 101.7 KARO-FM, an "easy listening" station in February 1983. In 1986, it became known as K102. Then in 1994, it became KPLA and has consistently been a Top 3 radio station in the market, playing "soft rock." KPLA broadcasts from the highest tower in Columbia, Missouri, reaching 70 miles (110 km) within Mid-Missouri.

== History ==
Al Germond was responsible for engineering and applying for the 101.7 frequency for KARO-FM under the company name of Columbia FM.
In 1992, Al Germond and his business partners, John Ott and David Baugher, bought KFRU-AM under the company name of Columbia AM. Later came additional radio stations, including KBXR-FM 102.3, KOQL-FM 106.1, KJMO-FM, KLIK-AM, KBBM-FM and KZJF-FM, as well as ownership of the Columbia Business Times publishing products.
By February 2004, the company had become Premier Marketing Group and sold the radio stations to Cumulus Broadcasting for $38.75 million. Cumulus Broadcasting assumed operation on March 1, 2004.

== Programming ==
Playing soft rock music from the 70s, 80s, 90s and beyond, KPLA remains one of the top-rated radio stations in Columbia. The station airs all-Christmas music from late November until the end of the year.
Notable weekday programming on the station includes "Good Mornings", hosted by Emily Larkin. The show was formerly called "Chris and Monica in the Morning", since it was co-hosted by Chris Kellogg and Monica Senecal. On June 27, 2013, it was announced that Senecal would be retiring from radio and her last show would be July 5. Emily Larkin replaced her position, after which the show was referred to as "Chris and Emily". Kellogg left the show in July 2016. Today, Larkin hosts solo and is also the station's program director.

Other weekday programming includes the voice-tracked Rachel Marisay from 10:00 AM to 2:00 PM; Todd Alan from 2:00 PM to 7:00 PM; and syndicated host John Tesh from 7:00 PM to Midnight. The Midnight to 6:00 AM timeframe has no programming and contains only music and advertisements.

Weekend programming includes John Tesh episodes on Saturday mornings starting at 6:00 AM and going until 9:00 AM. Saturday afternoons and evenings are dedicated music-only timeframes. "Your Weekend with Jim Brickman" airs Sunday mornings from 7:00 AM to 11:00 AM. The station computer treats this as a music-only timeframe—Brickman's own playlist airs during this time. At 7:00 PM, John Tesh airs, starting the cycle over again.

== Alumni ==
Sarah Hunter was part of the KPLA dating back to 1987 and the "K102" days of the radio station. She was co-host on the morning show with a variety of male counterparts, including J. R. Greely, Rob Carson, Tom Bradley and Kevin Hilley. Sarah retired from radio in May 2005.

Chris Kellogg's history as part of Columbia radio dates back to 1985 with 98.3 KFMZ. In November 1994, he was part of a new radio station in Columbia, KOQL 102.3, known as KOOL 102.3. NCD Broadcasting was the original company that started KOQL-FM under a local marketing agreement with KPLA's parent company. KOQL-FM was later bought by KPLA's parent company and in 2002, Kellogg was moved to middays on KPLA.

Tom Bradley's career in Columbia started with KTGR-AM when the radio station was broadcasting country music. After leaving the area in the 1980s, Tom returned to Columbia to launch KCLR-FM. He left KCLR for St. Louis and returned in 1994 to KPLA until 2002.
