= WUKV (FM) =

K-Love radio station in Trion, Georgia

- Trion, Georgia; United States
- Broadcast area: Rome, Georgia
- Frequency: 95.7 MHz

Programming
- Format: Contemporary Christian
- Network: K-Love

Ownership
- Owner: Educational Media Foundation

History
- First air date: 1996
- Former call signs: WATG (1992–2019)

Technical information
- Licensing authority: FCC
- Facility ID: 67769
- Class: A
- ERP: 1,300 watts
- HAAT: 213 meters (699 ft)
- Transmitter coordinates: 34°28′10.00″N 85°17′48.00″W

Links
- Public license information: Public file; LMS

WUKV (95.7 FM) is a Christian radio station broadcasting a Contemporary Christian music format. Licensed to Trion, Georgia, United States, the station serves the Rome, Georgia area. The station is currently owned by Educational Media Foundation. It has previously served as the flagship station for the Rome Braves.

Effective April 1, 2019, the-then WATG was acquired from TTA Broadcasting, Inc. by Educational Media Foundation for $200,000. The station coincidentally changed its call sign to WUKV. WUKV began broadcasting the K-Love network with a Contemporary Christian Music format covering NW Georgia and NE Alabama.
