= KLIK =

Currently silent
- Jefferson City, Missouri; United States
- Broadcast area: Columbia, Missouri
- Frequency: 1240 kHz
- Branding: KLIK News Talk 1240 AM 103.5 FM

Programming
- Format: News/talk
- Affiliations: ABC News Radio

Ownership
- Owner: Cumulus Media; (Cumulus Licensing LLC)

History
- First air date: 1937
- Former call signs: KWOS (1937-1999)

Technical information
- Licensing authority: FCC
- Facility ID: 68147
- Class: C
- Power: 1,000 watts
- Transmitter coordinates: 38°33′50.1″N 92°11′21.7″W
- Translator: 103.5 K278CT (Jefferson City)

Links
- Public license information: Public file; LMS

KLIK (1240 AM), branded as Newstalk 1240, is a radio station broadcasting a news/talk format. Licensed to Jefferson City, Missouri, United States, the station serves the Columbia, Missouri area. The station is currently owned by Cumulus Media. As of late 2018, KLIK has been operating on FM on 103.5 with translator K278CT.

== Programming ==
KLIK features programming from ABC Radio and Westwood One. It also operates a local news operation with sister station KFRU (1400 AM in Columbia, Missouri) The station also airs syndicated programming from Laura Ingraham, Jonathon Brandmeier, Phil Valentine, Clark Howard, John Batchelor, and Michael Medved. America at Night and America in the Morning with Jim Bohannon are also featured.

KLIK is the local radio home for Westwood One Radio Network coverage of the NFL, and a limited schedule of NCAA football and basketball coverage. KLIK also broadcasts MRN and PRN broadcasts of NASCAR Cup races. KLIK also simulcasts The Closers, a regional sports program, with KFRU in Columbia, Missouri.

== History ==
The station was first licensed on February 9, 1937, as KWOS on 1310 kHz, to the Tribune Printing Company. The call letters referenced an earlier Jefferson City station, WOS, which had been deleted the previous year.

In March 1941, with the implementation of the North American Regional Broadcasting Agreement, KWOS was transferred to 1340 kHz, along with most of the other stations on 1310 kHz. However, later that year the station was reassigned to a different "local" frequency, 1240 kHz.

From 1954 until September 8, 1999, the KLIK call letters were assigned to a station located at 950 AM, transmitting with a daytime power of 5,000 watts and a nighttime power of 500 watts (directional) from a four-tower array about 3.2 miles south of Jefferson City. Early owners of KLIK broadcast a varied format of news and talk programs including music programs of middle of the road, top 40, adult contemporary and country music as 95 KLIK. For many years, KLIK and KJFF as the two largest regional radio stations (the most powerful AM and FM stations in the region) dominated radio listenership in cumulative market share in the Columbia-Jeff City Market of Central Missouri. In the 1970s and early 1980s, the station was known as the Live 95 as its broadcasts were all programmed by live deejays, talk hosts and newscasters rather than by a satellite or automation system. The station once operated with an FM sister station in the 1970s and 1980s known as KJFF 106.9 FM, a 100,000 watt semi-automated easy listening music station with a large regional coverage signal. In the early 1980s, KLIK and KJFF-FM together were sold by the local Jefferson City operators to a regional group broadcaster, and newspaper publisher, Brill Media.

In about 1982, KJFF-FM 106.9 became an adult contemporary music station, initially with a satellite delivered music format, and easy listening music was phased out, along with the KJFF call letters, which were replaced by the new FM call signs of KTXY. KLIK 950 AM transitioned over from AC/Contemporary music at about the same time to a 24-hour-a-day live country/western format known as 95 Country. The station carried a variety of programming and a mostly country music format until the late 1990s.

On October 5, 1999, the station call letters on 1240 AM were changed from KWOS to KLIK. Until February 6, 2009, locally produced programming included "Jefferson City's Morning News with Jay Kersting" and "Partyline"—a show which dates back to 1954—with Rick Sinclair. Locally produced newscasts are currently anchored by David Gaines.

Former logo before translator sign on

KLIK went silent in March 2025. It is one of 11 Cumulus stations to close the weekend of March 14, as part of a larger shutdown of underperforming Cumulus stations.
