= Florence K (singer) =

Canadian singer and songwriter (born 1983)

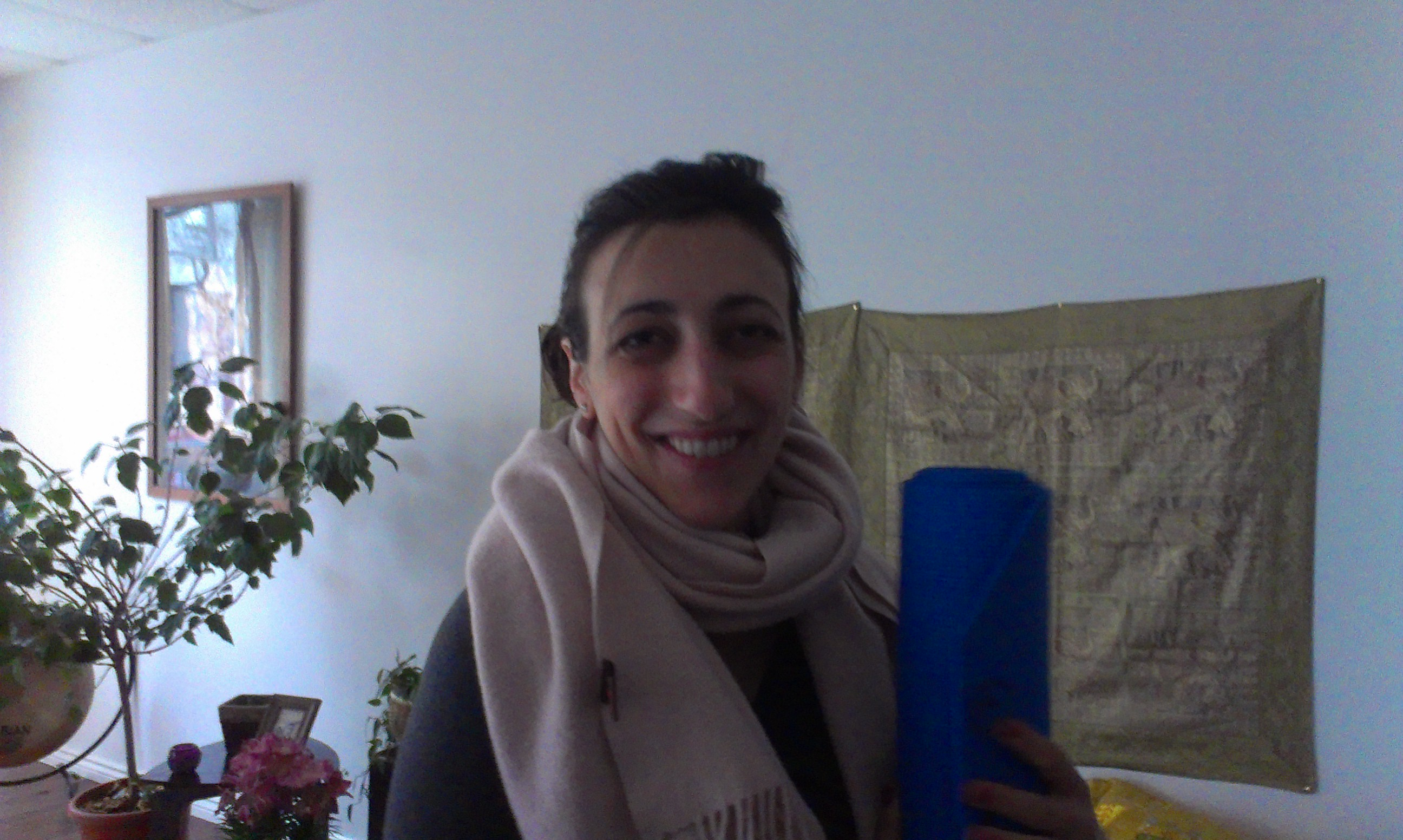
- Florence K in 2015

Background information
- Born: Florence Khoriaty; 5 February 1983 (age 43)
- Genres: Pop; jazz
- Occupations: Singer; songwriter
- Instrument: Vocals
- Years active: 2004–present
- Labels: Productions Red Blues; Universal Music Canada
- Website: florencek.com

Florence Khoriaty (born 5 February 1983), known as Florence K, is a Canadian pop singer and songwriter from Quebec, who performs material in English, French, Italian, Spanish and Portuguese. She is most noted for garnering a Juno Award nomination for Breakthrough Artist of the Year at the Juno Awards of 2014.

The daughter of musicians Hany Khoriaty and Natalie Choquette, she started in the music business playing piano and performing duets with her mother.

She released her debut album, Live au Lion d'Or, in 2005. She followed up in 2006 with Bossa Blue, which won the Prix Félix for Best World Music Album at the Gala de l'ADISQ in 2007. Her third album, La historia de Lola, was released in 2008, and her fourth, Havana Angels, was released in 2010.

She then signed a distribution deal with Universal Music Canada, leading to wider distribution for her 2013 album I'm Leaving You. The album was subsequently released in the United States in 2015, garnering a Grammy Award nomination for producer Larry Klein at the 58th Annual Grammy Awards.

In 2009, she was the spokesperson for the Mondial des cultures de Drummondville festival.

In September 2018 she debuted as the host of C'est formidable!, a francophone music program on CBC Radio One and CBC Music.

== Discography ==
- Live au Lion d'Or (2005)
- Bossa Blue (2006)
- La historia de Lola (2008)
- Havana Angels (2010)
- I'm Leaving You (2013)
- A new Christmas (2015)
- Estrellas (2018)
- Florence (2020)

She also worked on Franklin and the Adventures of the Noble Knights.
