= List of radio stations in Idaho =

The following is a list of FCC-licensed radio stations in the U.S. state of Idaho, which can be sorted by their call signs, frequencies, cities of license, licensees, and programming formats.

== List of radio stations ==
Call sign	Frequency	City of license	Licensee	Format
KACH	1340 AM	Preston	Preston Broadcasting, LLC	Classic hits
KAGF-LP	105.5 FM	Twin Falls	Amazing Grace Fellowship	Religious
KAIO	90.5 FM	Idaho Falls	Educational Media Foundation	Worship music (Air1)
KANP	91.3 FM	Ashton	Hi-Line Radio Fellowship Inc.	Christian
KAOX	107.9 FM	Shelley	Frandsen Media Company, LLC	News/Talk
KART	1400 AM	Jerome	KART Broadcasting Co., Inc.	Classic country
KATW	101.5 FM	Lewiston	Pacific Empire Radio Corporation	Hot adult contemporary
KAVY	89.1 FM	McCall	Idaho Conference of Seventh-Day Adventists, Inc.	Contemporary Christian
KAWO	104.3 FM	Boise	Townsquare License, LLC	Country
KAWS	89.1 FM	Marsing/Murphy	CSN International	Religious (CSN International)
KAWZ	89.9 FM	Twin Falls	CSN International	Religious (CSN International)
KBAR	1230 AM	Burley	Lee Family Broadcasting, Inc.	News Talk Information
KBFI	1450 AM	Bonners Ferry	Radio Bonners Ferry, Inc.	News/Talk
KBGN	1060 AM	Caldwell	Nelson M. and Karen E. Wilson	Christian
KBOI	670 AM	Boise	Radio License Holding CBC, LLC	News/Talk
KBOI-FM	93.1 FM	New Plymouth	Radio License Holding CBC, LLC	News/Talk
KBRV	800 AM	Soda Springs	Old West Media, Inc.	Country
KBSC	91.9 FM	Cambridge	Idaho State Board of Education	
KBSK	89.9 FM	McCall	Idaho State Board of Education	Public radio; Jazz
KBSM	91.7 FM	McCall	Idaho State Board of Education (Boise State University)	Public radio; Classical
KBSQ	90.7 FM	McCall	Idaho State Board of Education	Public radio; News/Talk
KBSS	91.1 FM	Sun Valley	Idaho State Board of Education	Public radio; News/Talk
KBSU	90.3 FM	Boise	Idaho State Board of Education	Public radio; Classical
KBSW	91.7 FM	Twin Falls	Idaho State Board of Education	Public radio; Classical
KBSX	91.5 FM	Boise	Idaho State Board of Education	Public radio; News/Talk
KBSY	88.5 FM	Burley	Idaho State Board of Education	Public radio; News/Talk
KBWE	91.9 FM	Burley	Tu Voz, Inc.	Spanish/English community radio
KBXL	94.1 FM	Caldwell	Inspirational Family Radio, Inc.	Christian talk
KBYI	94.3 FM	Rexburg	Brigham Young University – Idaho	College radio
KBYR-FM	91.5 FM	Rexburg	Brigham Young University – Idaho	Religious
KCDA	103.1 FM	Post Falls	iHM Licenses, LLC	Hot adult contemporary
KCHQ	100.1 FM	Soda Springs	Jackson Hole Media LLC	Silent
KCID	1490 AM	Caldwell	SNL Radio, LLC	Spanish Catholic
KCIR	90.7 FM	Twin Falls	Faith Communications Corp	Contemporary Christian
KCIX	105.9 FM	Garden City	Townsquare License, LLC	Adult top 40
KCNU	103.9 FM	Silver City	CSN International	Christian rock (Effect Radio)
KCVI	101.5 FM	Blackfoot	Riverbend Communications, LLC	Active rock
KDAD	103.7 FM	Victor	Jackson Radio Group, Inc.	Classic country
KDBI-FM	106.3 FM	Homedale	Radio Rancho, LLC	Regional Mexican
KDDE-LP	96.7 FM	American Falls	Templo Emanuel Asambleas de Dios	Spanish religious
KDIL	940 AM	Jerome	Karlee Ortega	Spanish adult hits
KDKI-LP	103.9 FM	Twin Falls	Tamarack Community Broadcasting, Inc.	Jazz/Big Band/Swing
KDPI	88.5 FM	Ketchum	KDPI Drop-In Radio, Inc.	Variety
KDZY	98.3 FM	McCall	Inspirational Family Radio, Inc.	Country
KECH-FM	95.3 FM	Sun Valley	Woods River Media, LLC	Classic rock
KEDJ	103.1 FM	Jerome	KART Broadcasting Co., Inc.	Active rock
KEFX	88.9 FM	Twin Falls	CSN International	Christian rock (Effect Radio)
KEZJ	1450 AM	Twin Falls	Salt & Light Radio, Inc.	Spanish Catholic
KEZJ-FM	95.7 FM	Twin Falls	Townsquare License, LLC	Country
KFFI-LP	103.1 FM	Boise	Viva Latino	
KFTZ	103.3 FM	Idaho Falls	Riverbend Communications, LLC	Top 40 (CHR)
KFXD	630 AM	Boise	Townsquare License, LLC	Rhythmic contemporary
KGEM	1140 AM	Boise	SNL Radio, LLC	Catholic
KGSY	88.3 FM	McCall	Idaho Conference of Seventh-Day Adventists, Inc.	Contemporary Christian
KGTM	98.1 FM	Shelley	RJ Broadcasting LS, LLC	Hot adult contemporary
KGVI-FM	89.5 FM	Grangeville	Summit Academy, Inc., DBA St. John Bosco Academy	
KHLY	1440 AM	Hailey	Sun Valley Media Group, LLC	Alternative rock, variety
KHTQ	94.5 FM	Hayden	Queenb Radio, Inc.	Active rock
KIBR	102.5 FM	Sandpoint	Benefield Broadcasting Inc.	Country
KIBX	92.1 FM	Bonners Ferry	Spokane Public Radio, Inc.	NPR/Classical/Jazz
KICR	102.3 FM	Coeur D'Alene	Great Northern Broadcasting, Inc.	Country
KIDG	92.1 FM	Pocatello	Rich Broadcasting Idaho LS, LLC	News/Talk (KIDJ simulcast)
KIDH-LP	97.5 FM	Meridian	Calvary Chapel Meridian, Inc.	Religious Teaching
KIDJ	106.3 FM	Sugar City	Rich Broadcasting Idaho LS, LLC	News/Talk
KIDO	580 AM	Nampa	Townsquare License, LLC	News/Talk
KIGO	1420 AM	St. Anthony	Albino Ortega & Maria Juarez	Regional Mexican
KIKX	104.7 FM	Ketchum	Iliad Media Group Holdings Inc.	Adult hits
KIRQ	106.7 FM	Hailey	Iliad Media Group Holdings Inc.	Adult contemporary
KISU-FM	91.1 FM	Pocatello	Idaho State University	Public
KIXM	92.3 FM	Victor	Jackson Radio Group, Inc.	Top 40 (CHR)
KIYE	88.7 FM	Kamiah	Nez Perce Tribe	Variety
KIZN	92.3 FM	Boise	Radio License Holding CBC, LLC	Country
KJOT	105.1 FM	Boise	Lotus Boise Corp.	Adult hits
KKAG	88.3 FM	Grangeville	Calvary Chapel of Grangeville, Inc.	Oldies
KKEH	91.7 FM	Ponderay	Upper Columbia Mission Society of Seventh-day Adventists	
KKEX	96.7 FM	Preston	Sun Valley Radio, Inc.	Country
KKGL	96.9 FM	Nampa	Radio License Holding CBC, LLC	Classic rock
KKMV	106.1 FM	Rupert	Lee Family Broadcasting, Inc.	Country
KKOO	1260 AM	Weiser	Iliad Media Group Holdings Inc.	Oldies
KKRH	90.9 FM	Grangeville	Calvary Chapel of Grangeville, Inc.	Christian
KKRK	970 AM	Rupert	Lee Family Broadcasting, Inc.	Classic rock/hits
KLCE	97.3 FM	Blackfoot	Riverbend Communications, LLC	Adult contemporary
KLCZ	88.9 FM	Lewiston	Idaho State Board of Education	Public radio; News/Talk
KLER	1300 AM	Orofino	Central Idaho Broadcasting, Inc.	Country
KLER-FM	103.3 FM	Orofino	Central Idaho Broadcasting, Inc.	Adult contemporary
KLGG	89.3 FM	Kellogg	Spokane Public Radio, Inc.	NPR/Classical/Jazz
KLIX	1310 AM	Twin Falls	Townsquare License, LLC	News/Talk
KLIX-FM	96.5 FM	Twin Falls	Townsquare License, LLC	Classic hits
KLLP	98.5 FM	Blackfoot	Rich Broadcasting Idaho LS, LLC	Hot adult contemporary
KLRI	89.5 FM	Rigby	Educational Media Foundation	Contemporary Christian (K-Love)
KLXI	99.5 FM	Fruitland	Educational Media Foundation	Contemporary Christian (K-Love)
KLZX	95.9 FM	Weston	Sun Valley Radio, Inc.	Classic rock
KMEI-LP	97.3 FM	Kamiah	Kamiah Valley Broadcasting Corporation	Christian
KMGI	102.5 FM	Pocatello	Idaho Wireless Corporation	Classic rock
KMHI	1240 AM	Mountain Home	CSN International	Religious (CSN International)
KMHR	950 AM	Boise	Azteca Media, LLC	Regional Mexican
KMOK	106.9 FM	Lewiston	McVey Entertainment Group, LLC	Country
KNBL	1260 AM	Idaho Falls	Riverbend Communications, LLC	Farm and classic country
KNWO	90.1 FM	Cottonwood	Washington State University	Public radio; News/Talk, Classical
KOAY	88.7 FM	Middleton	Idaho Conference of Seventh-Day Adventists, Inc.	Christian CHR
KOFE	1240 AM	St. Maries	Theresa Plank	Classic hits
KORR	104.1 FM	American Falls	Idaho Wireless Corporation	Adult top 40
KORT	1230 AM	Grangeville	Nelly Broadcasting Idaho, LLC	Classic hits
KORT-FM	92.7 FM	Grangeville	Nelly Broadcasting Idaho, LLC	Country
KOTF-LP	97.5 FM	Hayden	Hayden Christian Broadcasting Corporation	Religious Teaching
KOUU	1290 AM	Pocatello	Idaho Wireless Corporation	Country
KOUW	102.9 FM	Island Park	Magic Valley Media, LLC	News/Talk
KOZE	950 AM	Lewiston	McVey Entertainment Group, LLC	News/Talk
KOZE-FM	96.5 FM	Lewiston	McVey Entertainment Group, LLC	Album-oriented rock
KPDA	100.7 FM	Mountain Home	Radio Rancho, LLC	Regional Mexican
KPKY	94.9 FM	Pocatello	Rich Broadcasting Idaho LS, LLC	Classic rock
KPLL-LP	94.9 FM	Lewiston	Lewiston Christian Radio Association	Contemporary Christian
KQBL	101.9 FM	Emmett	Iliad Media Group Holdings Inc.	Country
KQEO	107.1 FM	Idaho Falls	Sand Hill Media Corp.	Classic hits
KQFC	97.9 FM	Boise	Radio License Holding CBC, LLC	Soft adult contemporary
KQFR	90.7 FM	Moyle Springs	Upper Columbia Corporation of Seventh-day Adventists	
KQPI	99.5 FM	Aberdeen	Sandhill Media Group	Country (KUPI-FM simulcast)
KQXR	100.3 FM	Payette	Lotus Boise Corp.	Active rock
KQZB	100.5 FM	Troy	Pacific Empire Communications Corp.	Classic hits
KRBX	89.9 FM	Caldwell	Boise Community Radio Project, Inc.	Freeform
KRFA-FM	91.7 FM	Moscow	Washington State University	Public radio; News/Talk, Classical
KRFP	90.3 FM	Moscow	Radio Free Moscow, Inc.	Community
KRFY	88.5 FM	Ponderay	Panhandle Community Radio, Inc.	Variety
KRPL	1400 AM	Moscow	KRPL, Inc.	Sports (ESPN)
KRRB	88.1 FM	Kuna	Pensacola Christian College, Inc.	Contemporary Christian
KRVB	94.9 FM	Nampa	Lotus Boise Corp.	Adult album alternative
KRXK	1230 AM	Rexburg	RJ Broadcasting LS, LLC	Silent
KRXR	1480 AM	Gooding	Maria Elena Juarez	Regional Mexican
KSAS-FM	103.5 FM	Caldwell	Townsquare License, LLC	Top 40 (CHR)
KSEI	930 AM	Pocatello	Idaho Wireless Corporation	Conservative talk
KSKI-FM	94.5 FM	Sun Valley	Magic Valley Media, LLC	Alternative rock
KSNA	100.7 FM	Idaho Falls	Sand Hill Media Corp.	Adult top 40
KSNQ	98.3 FM	Twin Falls	Townsquare License, LLC	Classic rock
KSPD	790 AM	Boise	Inspirational Family Radio, Inc.	Christian talk
KSPT	1400 AM	Sandpoint	Blue Sky Broadcasting Inc.	News Talk Information
KSPZ	980 AM	Ammon	Sandhill Media Group, LLC	Sports (FSR)
KSQS	91.7 FM	Ririe	Faith Communications Corp.	Contemporary Christian
KSRA	960 AM	Salmon	Bitterroot Communications, Inc.	Adult contemporary
KSRA-FM	92.7 FM	Salmon	Bitterroot Communications, Inc.	Country
KTAQ-LP	97.7 FM	Sandpoint	Sandpoint Christian Broadcasting Corp.	Religious Teaching
KTFI	1270 AM	Twin Falls	Salt & Light Radio, Inc.	Catholic
KTFY	88.1 FM	Buhl	Idaho Conference of Seventh-Day Adventists, Inc.	Contemporary Christian
KTHI	107.1 FM	Caldwell	Lotus Boise Corp.	Classic country
KTHK	105.5 FM	Idaho Falls	Riverbend Communications, LLC	Sports (WW1)
KTIK	1350 AM	Nampa	Radio License Holding CBC, LLC	Sports (ISN)
KTPO	106.7 FM	Kootenai	Hellroaring Communications L.L.C.	Adult album alternative
KTPZ	92.7 FM	Hazelton	Iliad Media Group Holdings Inc.	Top 40 (CHR)
KTRP	1450 AM	Notus	Centro Familiar Cristiano	Silent
KTSY	89.5 FM	Caldwell	Idaho Conference of Seventh-Day Adventists, Inc.	Contemporary Christian
KTWD	103.5 FM	Wallace	Penfold Communications, Inc.	Christian
KUJJ	95.5 FM	McCall	Inspirational Family Radio, Inc.	Adult contemporary
KUMC-LP	93.3 FM	Rupert	Rupert United Methodist Church	Religious
KUOI-FM	89.3 FM	Moscow	University of Idaho	Public radio
KUPI-FM	99.1 FM	Rexburg	Sandhill Media Group, LLC	Country
KUPY	99.9 FM	Sugar City	Frandsen Media Company, LLC	Country (KUPI-FM simulcast)
KVNI	1080 AM	Coeur D'Alene	Queenb Radio, Inc.	Classic hits
KVSI	1450 AM	Montpelier	SVI Media, LLC	Adult contemporary
KVTY	105.1 FM	Lewiston	McVey Entertainment Group, LLC	Hot adult contemporary
KWFI-FM	96.1 FM	Aberdeen	Rich Broadcasting Idaho LS, LLC	Country
KWFO-FM	102.1 FM	Driggs	Rich Broadcasting Idaho LS, LLC	Country (KWFI-FM simulcast)
KWIK	1240 AM	Pocatello	Rich Broadcasting Idaho LS, LLC	News/Talk
KWIS	88.3 FM	Plummer	Coeur d'Alene Tribe	Community radio
KWRV	91.9 FM	Sun Valley	Idaho State Board of Education	Classical music / Public radio
KWYD	101.1 FM	Parma	Iliad Media Group Holdings Inc.	Rhythmic-leaning Top 40 (CHR)
KXCD	93.5 FM	Fairfield	Lee Family Broadcasting, Inc.	Regional Mexican
KXGV-LP	98.5 FM	Garden Valley	Garden Valley Communications Inc.	Religious/Variety
KXJO	92.1 FM	St. Maries	Spokane Public Radio, Inc.	NPR/Classical/Jazz
KXLT-FM	107.9 FM	Eagle	Townsquare License, LLC	Soft adult contemporary
KXQZ	1340 AM	Wendell	Maria Ortega Heredia	Catholic
KXTA-FM	99.1 FM	Gooding	Lee Family Broadcasting, Inc.	Regional Mexican
KYMS	89.9 FM	Rathdrum	Legacy Broadcasting, Inc.	Christian
KYSK	88.7 FM	Ririe	Watersprings Ministries	Contemporary Christian
KYUN	102.1 FM	Twin Falls	Iliad Media Group Holdings Inc.	Country
KYWN	890 AM	Meridian	Impacto Network, Inc.	Christian
KYZK	107.5 FM	Sun Valley	Magic Valley Media, LLC	Classic country
KZBG	97.7 FM	Lapwai	Nelly Broadcasting, LLC	Country
KZBQ	93.9 FM	Pocatello	Idaho Wireless Corporation	Country
KZDX	99.9 FM	Burley	Lee Family Broadcasting, Inc.	Hot adult contemporary
KZFN	106.1 FM	Moscow	KRPL, Inc.	Top 40 (CHR)
KZID	98.5 FM	Culdesac	Nelly Broadcasting, LLC	Classic hits
KZJB	90.3 FM	Pocatello	Calvary Chapel of Idaho Falls, Inc.	Religious
KZKY	104.5 FM	Ucon	Rich Broadcasting Idaho LS, LLC	Classic rock
KZMG	102.7 FM	Melba	Iliad Media Group Holdings Inc.	Hot adult contemporary
KZNP	90.7 FM	Mullan	Hi-Line Radio Fellowship, Inc.	Religious

== Defunct ==
- KDBI
- KEII
- KID
- KLCW-LP
- KMCL
- KPCQ
- KRLC
- KRSI
- KSKI
- KTSJ
- KWAL
