= KXCD =

Simulcasting KXTA-FM Gooding
- Fairfield, Idaho; United States
- Frequency: 93.5 MHz
- Branding: 99.1 Y 93.5 La Perrona

Programming
- Format: Regional Mexican

Ownership
- Owner: Kim and Jami Lee; (Lee Family Broadcasting, Inc.)
- Sister stations: KART, KBAR, KEDJ, KKMV, KKRK, KXTA-FM, KZDX

History
- Former call signs: KXML (2008–2018)
- Former frequencies: 99.9 MHz (2008–2022)

Technical information
- Licensing authority: FCC
- Facility ID: 164259
- Class: C
- ERP: 74,000 watts
- HAAT: 497 metres (1,631 ft)
- Transmitter coordinates: 43°16′49″N 114°49′15″W

Links
- Public license information: Public file; LMS
- Webcast: Listen Live
- Website: www.991laperrona.com

KXCD (93.5 FM) is a radio station licensed to serve the community of Fairfield, Idaho. The station is owned by Kim and Jami Lee's Lee Family Broadcasting Group, through licensee Lee Family Broadcasting, Inc. It airs a Regional Mexican format.

The station was assigned the call sign KXML by the Federal Communications Commission (FCC) on April 14, 2008. The station changed its call sign to KXCD on November 26, 2018.

KXCD has an outstanding construction permit with the FCC to increase its power from 200 to 40,000 watts and move its community of license from Salmon to Fairfield, Idaho, as a class C station.

The station became a simulcast of KXTA-FM's Regional Mexican format on December 13, 2022.
