= KQZB =

Radio station in Troy, Idaho, serving Pullman, Washington

- Troy, Idaho; United States
- Broadcast area: Pullman, Washington; Moscow, Idaho
- Frequency: 100.5 MHz
- Branding: 100.5 KQZB

Programming
- Format: Classic hits

Ownership
- Owner: Pacific Empire Radio Corporation
- Sister stations: KATW, KVAB, KCLK, KCLK-FM

History
- First air date: 2016

Technical information
- Licensing authority: FCC
- Facility ID: 164223
- Class: C3
- ERP: 900 watts
- HAAT: 487 meters (1,598 ft)
- Transmitter coordinates: 46.81138°N 116.91751°W

Links
- Public license information: Public file; LMS
- Website: KQZB Online

KQZB is an FM radio station licensed to Troy, Idaho and broadcasting on a frequency of 100.5 Megahertz. From 2016 to 2019, the station was known as "Hits 100" and owned by Pullman Radio Inc. In September 2019, the station was renamed as "100.5 KQZB" and was sold to the Pacific Empire Radio Corporation

KQZB airs a classic hits format and is owned by Pacific Empire Radio Corporation.

Former logo 2016-2019
