= KOZE =

KOZE or Koze may refer to:

- KOZE (AM), a radio station (950 AM) licensed to Lewiston, Idaho, United States
- KOZE-FM, a radio station (96.5 FM) licensed to Lewiston
- KLER (AM), a radio station (1300 AM) licensed to Lewiston, Idaho, which held the call sign KOZE from 1964 until the 1990s.
- DJ Koze, a German electronic music producer
