= KXQZ =

KXQZ may refer to:

- KXQZ (AM), a radio station (1340 AM) licensed to serve Wendell, Idaho, United States
- KTFI (AM), a radio station (1270 AM) licensed to serve Twin Falls, Idaho, which held the call sign KXQZ from 2012 to 2015
