= KPDA =

KPDA may refer to:

- KPDA (FM), a radio station (100.7 FM) licensed to serve Mountain Home, Idaho, United States
- KXTA-FM, a radio station (99.1 FM) licensed to serve Gooding, Idaho, which held the call sign KPDA from 2008 to 2010 and KPDA-FM from 2010 to 2013
- KTFI (AM), a radio station (1270 AM) licensed to serve Twin Falls, Idaho, which held the call sign KPDA from 2010 to 2012
