= KTFI =

KTFI may refer to:

- KTFI (AM), a radio station (1270 AM) licensed to Twin Falls, Idaho, United States
- KXQZ (AM), a radio station (1340 AM) licensed to Wendell, Idaho, which held the call sign KTFI from 2011 to 2015
