= KBSC =

KBSC may refer to:

- KBSC (FM), a radio station (91.9 FM) licensed to serve Cambridge, Idaho, United States; see List of radio stations in Idaho
- KBSC-TV, the former call sign for television station KVEA the serving the Los Angeles, California area
