= KCHQ =

KCHQ may refer to:

- KCHQ (FM), a radio station (100.1 FM) licensed to serve Soda Springs, Idaho, United States
- KWFO-FM, a radio station (102.1 FM) licensed to serve Driggs, Idaho, which held the call sign KCHQ from 2002 to 2015 and from 2015 to 2018
- KOUW, a radio station (102.9 FM) licensed to serve Island Park, Idaho, which held the call sign KCHQ in 2015
- KYLZ (FM), a radio station (101.3 FM) licensed to serve Albuquerque, New Mexico, United States, which held the call sign KCHQ in 2001
- KKRG-FM, a radio station (105.1 FM) licensed to serve Santa Fe, New Mexico, which held the call sign KCHQ from 1999 to 2001
- Khatam al-Anbiya Central Headquarters, an Iranian military command
