= KXTA =

KXTA may refer to:

- Homey Airport (ICAO code KXTA), located at the installation known as Area 51
- KXTA-FM, a radio station (99.1 FM) licensed to serve Gooding, Idaho, United States
- KKRK, a radio station (970 AM) licensed to serve Rupert, Idaho, which held the call sign KXTA from 2015 to 2020
- KTUB, a radio station (1600 AM) licensed to Centerville, Utah, United States, which held the call sign KXTA from September 2005 to November 2007
- KEIB, a radio station (1150 AM) licensed to Los Angeles, California, United States, which held the call sign KXTA from August 1997 to February 2005
