= KCLK =

KCLK may refer to:

- KCLK-FM, a radio station (94.1 FM) licensed to Clarkston, Washington, United States
- KCLK (AM), a radio station (1430 AM) licensed to Asotin, Washington, United States
