= KZBQ =

Radio station in Pocatello, Idaho

- Pocatello, Idaho; United States
- Broadcast area: Pocatello, Idaho; Idaho Falls, Idaho
- Frequency: 93.9 MHz
- Branding: KZBQ FM 93.9

Programming
- Format: Country

Ownership
- Owner: Idaho Wireless Corporation

History
- First air date: 1969 (at 93.7)
- Former frequencies: 93.7 MHz (1969–2016)

Technical information
- Licensing authority: FCC
- Facility ID: 28254
- Class: C0
- ERP: 100,000 watts
- HAAT: 308.4 meters (1,012 ft)
- Transmitter coordinates: 42°51′57″N 112°30′44″W

Links
- Public license information: Public file; LMS
- Webcast: Listen Live
- Website: kzbq.com

KZBQ (93.9 FM) is a country music format radio station located in Pocatello, Idaho, United States, serving the Pocatello area. Its signal emanates from the KZBQ broadcast tower on Howard Mountain, east of Pocatello in Bannock County, Idaho.

KZBQ is owned and operated by Idaho Wireless Corporation, a local company that also owns and operates sister stations KMGI, KOUU, and KSEI in Pocatello, Idaho, and KORR in American Falls, Idaho.

== History ==
First licensed on August 15, 1969, as KSNN on 93.7 MHz, under ownership of Pocatello Broadcasting Co., which also owned its sister AM KSNN.

The station was assigned the callsign KZBQ on January 23, 1995.

On December 14, 2016, KZBQ moved from 93.7 FM to 93.9 FM. The station was licensed by the Federal Communications Commission to operate on that frequency on December 19, 2016.
