= KLER =

KLER may refer to:

- KLER (AM), a radio station (1300 AM) licensed to Orofino, Idaho, United States
- KLER-FM, a radio station (95.1 FM) licensed to Orofino, Idaho, United States
