= KSRA =

KSRA may refer to:

- KSRA (AM), a radio station (960 AM) licensed to Salmon, Idaho, United States
- KSRA-FM, a radio station (92.7 FM) licensed to Salmon, Idaho, United States
