= KZNO =

KZNO may refer to:

- KZNO-LD, a low-power television station (channel 6) licensed to serve Big Bear Lake, California, United States
- KKRK, a radio station (970 AM) licensed to serve Rupert, Idaho, United States, which held the call sign KZNO from 2014 to 2015
- KEDJ, a radio station (103.1 FM) licensed to serve Jerome, Idaho, which held the call sign KZNO from 2012 to 2014
