= KMCL =

KMCL may refer to:

- Kerala Rapid Transit Corporation Ltd, a transportation company in India
- KMCL (AM), a defunct radio station, formerly licensed to Donnelly, Idaho, United States
