= KMZO =

- Hamilton, Montana; United States
- Frequency: 90.7 MHz

Programming
- Format: Contemporary Christian
- Affiliations: Sounds of the Spirit

Ownership
- Owner: Faith Communications Corp.
- Sister stations: KSOS, KHMS, KSQS, KCIR, KMZL, KANN

Technical information
- Licensing authority: FCC
- Facility ID: 92534
- ERP: 5,000 watts
- HAAT: 101 meters (331 ft)
- Transmitter coordinates: 46°13′46″N 114°14′01″W

Links
- Public license information: Public file; LMS
- Webcast: http://www.sosradio.net
- Website: http://www.sosradio.net

KMZO (90.7 FM) is a radio station licensed to serve Hamilton, Montana, United States. The station is owned by Faith Communications Corp. and broadcasts a Contemporary Christian music format, including religious programming from the SOS Radio Network.

The station was assigned the KMZO call letters by the Federal Communications Commission on August 13, 2002.

== Translators ==
Call sign	Frequency	City of license	FID	ERP (W)	HAAT	FCC info
K218BT	(91.5 FM) FM	Darby, MT	20546	9	−306 m (−1,004 ft)	LMS
