= KSKI (AM) =

Radio station in Hailey, Idaho (1960–1992)

- Hailey, Idaho; United States
- Broadcast area: Sun Valley, Idaho
- Frequency: 1340 KHz

Programming
- Format: Country

Ownership
- Owner: Silver Creek Communications, Inc.

History
- First air date: November 17, 1960 (in Sun Valley); February 10, 1966 (in Hailey)
- Last air date: 1992
- Call sign meaning: "Ski"

Technical information
- Facility ID: 60391
- Power: 1,000 watts day; 250 watts night

KSKI was an AM radio station at 1340 kHz in Hailey, Idaho, which broadcast between 1960 and 1992. The station was the first in the Wood River Valley and spawned a successful FM station, KSKI-FM, which remains on the air. It ceased broadcasting due to economic difficulties spurred by the launch of radio station KECH-FM, which was KSKI-AM-FM's first competitor in the Sun Valley area.

== History ==
KSKI signed on the air on November 17, 1960. The station was initially licensed to Sun Valley and gave the resort town its first full-time radio service, broadcasting from studios located in the Sun Valley Lodge at the resort and a transmitter in Ketchum. The original owner was Radio Sun Valley, Inc., with Roger Hagadone as president.

It was not long before KSKI sought to move from Sun Valley. In 1963, it filed its first application to relocate its studio base and transmitter to Hailey; later that year, it went silent for what turned out to be two years while the station made the move. The FCC granted the application on September 8, 1965; while KSKI was to go on air from Hailey on December 1, it did not sign on until February 10, 1966.

On February 1, 1969, Kent Frandsen became KSKI's general manager; four years later, he bought the station from Hagadone under the name Sun Valley Radio, Inc., for $1 plus the assumption of more than $41,000 in liabilities. Frandsen's ownership of KSKI saw the station apply in 1974 for a new FM station on 93.5 MHz, which would transmit from Bald Mountain and bring with it an expansion of the studios in Hailey. The FCC finally granted the KSKI-FM application in January 1977, and the station went on the air that August 3. KSKI AM simulcast its new FM sister from 6 a.m. to 9 a.m. and again from 7 p.m. to midnight. KSKI-AM-FM were known for their eclectic mix of music programming, aiming to serve listeners in a market that had no other radio stations; the pair also gained a small but devoted audience in the larger Twin Falls area.

The AM station changed its call letters to KNRC on December 2, 1985, but changed back to KSKI on July 1, 1987. The station was airing a crossover country format by 1989.

In November 1989, KSKI-AM-FM was sold to Silver Creek Communications, a company of businessman John McCaw, Jr., for $950,000; while McCaw owned cable systems and was in the middle of acquiring TV station group LIN Broadcasting, his other radio holdings were all in Alaska. The AM station continued to operate until late 1992. Economic difficulties in the local advertising market caused by the launch of competing station KECH-FM, which had taken to the air in 1988, prompted Silver Creek to shutter the AM station and send the license to the Federal Communications Commission for cancellation. Not long after, Silver Creek converted the operations of KSKI-FM to an automated service known as "The Mountain", programmed specifically for ski resort areas with special Sun Valley-specific inserts from its base at KZYR in Colorado.
