= Sounds of the Spirit =

American Christian radio network

- Type: Radio Network
- Country: United States

Ownership
- Owner: Faith Communications Corporation

History
- Launch date: 1972

Coverage
- Availability: Western United States via radio stations and FM translators. Worldwide via audio streaming at SOSradio.net.

Links
- Webcast: SOS Webstream
- Website: SOSradio.net

Sounds of the Spirit (S.O.S. Radio) is a network of 28 non-commercial, listener-supported radio stations and FM translators in the Western United States broadcasting a Contemporary Christian music format. The stations and network are owned by Faith Communications, a non-profit corporation.

Faith Communications has offices and studios on South 6th Street off East Sahara Avenue in Las Vegas. In addition to music, the network also carries several national Christian talk and teaching programs: Focus on the Family, Insight for Living with Chuck Swindoll and In Touch with Dr. Charles Stanley.

== Stations ==
Sounds of the Spirit is a network of seven radio stations and 21 FM translators. The network's flagship station is 90.5 KSOS in Las Vegas.

=== Full-powered stations ===
Call sign	Frequency	City of license	State	Class	Power (W)	ERP (W)	Height (m (ft))	FCC info
KHMS	88.5 FM	Victorville	California	A	—	200	461 m (1,512 ft)	FCC (KHMS)
KSQS	91.7 FM	Ririe	Idaho	A	—	250	162.2 m (532 ft)	FCC (KSQS)
KCIR	90.7 FM	Twin Falls	Idaho	C	—	44,100	762 m (2,500 ft)	FCC (KCIR)
KMZO	90.7 FM	Hamilton	Montana	A	—	5,000	101 m (331 ft)	FCC (KMZO)
KMZL	91.1 FM	Missoula	Montana	C1	—	2,700	626 m (2,054 ft)	FCC (KMZL)
KSOS (Note: Flagship station)	90.5 FM	Las Vegas	Nevada	C	—	100,000	387 m (1,270 ft)	FCC (KSOS)
KANN	1120 AM	Roy	Utah	B	10,000 (Day); 1,100 (Night)	—	—	FCC (KANN)

=== Translators ===
In addition to its full-powered stations, Sounds of the Spirit is relayed by an additional 21 translators.

Call sign	Frequency	City of license	FID	ERP (W)	HAAT	FCC info
K213EC	90.5 FM	Bullhead City, AZ	20501	105	678.9 m (2,227 ft)	LMS
K276BM	103.1 FM	Kingman, AZ	67805	82	8.92 m (29 ft)	LMS
K202DM	88.3 FM	Barstow, CA	20525	10	234.8 m (770 ft)	LMS
K211EY	90.1 FM	Palmdale, CA	86849	10	208.1 m (683 ft)	LMS
K204CC	88.7 FM	Challis, ID	10104	10	760 m (2,493 ft)	LMS
K209BO	89.7 FM	Tetonia, ID	20545	10	580 m (1,903 ft)	LMS
K204AL	88.7 FM	Pocatello, ID	20513	29	281 m (922 ft)	LMS
K257DJ	99.3 FM	Salmon, ID	10893	47	936 m (3,071 ft)	LMS
K218BT	91.5 FM	Darby, MT	20546	9	−306 m (−1,004 ft)	LMS
K237AX	95.3 FM	Caliente, NV	20543	5	−18 m (−59 ft)	LMS
K212AM	90.3 FM	Carlin, NV	19397	46	560 m (1,837 ft)	LMS
K216BB	91.1 FM	Elko, NV	19388	10	297.8 m (977 ft)	LMS
K216EV	90.3 FM	Logandale, NV	93131	48	122.4 m (402 ft)	LMS
K244CE	96.7 FM	Pahrump, NV	54320	170	−99.6 m (−327 ft)	LMS
K276BL	103.1 FM	Pahrump, NV	20510	157	1,097 m (3,599 ft)	LMS
K285AT	104.9 FM	Pioche, NV	20538	115	1,061 m (3,481 ft)	LMS
K237AY	95.3 FM	Pioche, NV	20533	5	282 m (925 ft)	LMS
K285BO	104.9 FM	Wells, NV	20514	78	361 m (1,184 ft)	LMS
K204BU	88.7 FM	Silver City, NM	20540	11	319 m (1,047 ft)	LMS
K210DU	89.9 FM	Saint George, UT	20504	52	39.2 m (129 ft)	LMS
K221DT	92.1 FM	Thayne, WY	86134	10	702 m (2,303 ft)	LMS
