= KBYR =

KBYR may refer to:

- KBYR (AM), a radio station (700 AM) licensed to Anchorage, Alaska, United States
- KBYR-FM, a radio station (91.5 FM) licensed to Rexburg, Idaho, United States
