= KHMS =

- Victorville, California; United States
- Broadcast area: Victor Valley
- Frequency: 88.5 MHz

Programming
- Format: Contemporary Christian
- Affiliations: Sounds of the Spirit

Ownership
- Owner: Faith Communications Corp.
- Sister stations: KANN; KCIR; KMZL; KMZO; KSOS; KSQS

Technical information
- Licensing authority: FCC
- Facility ID: 20539
- Class: A
- ERP: 200 watts
- HAAT: 461.0 meters (1,512.5 ft)
- Transmitter coordinates: 34°36′40″N 117°17′20″W
- Translator: See § Translators

Links
- Public license information: Public file; LMS
- Website: sosradio.net

KHMS (88.5 FM), "Sounds of the Spirit", is a radio station broadcasting a Contemporary Christian format. Licensed to Victorville, California, United States, it serves the Victor Valley area. The station is owned by Faith Communications Corp. and features programming provided from the SOS Radio Network.

== Translators ==
| Call sign | Frequency | City of license | FID | ERP (W) | HAAT | FCC info |
|---|---|---|---|---|---|---|
| K202DM | 88.3 FM | Barstow, California | 20525 | 10 | 234.8 m (770 ft) | LMS |
| K211EY | 90.1 FM | Palmdale, California | 86849 | 10 | 208.1 m (683 ft) | LMS |
