= KANN =

Currently Silent
- Roy, Utah; United States
- Broadcast area: Ogden/Salt Lake City, Utah
- Frequency: 1120 kHz

Programming
- Format: Contemporary Christian
- Affiliations: Sounds of the Spirit

Ownership
- Owner: Faith Communications Corporation
- Sister stations: KSOS, KHMS, KSQS, KCIR, KMZO, KMZL

History
- First air date: 1961

Technical information
- Licensing authority: FCC
- Facility ID: 20509
- Class: B
- Power: 10,000 watts (day); 1,100 watts (night)
- Transmitter coordinates: 41°3′31″N 112°4′10″W

Links
- Public license information: Public file; LMS
- Webcast: Listen Live
- Website: www.sosradio.net/

KANN (1120 AM) is a radio station broadcasting a Contemporary Christian format. Licensed to Roy, Utah, United States, the station serves the Ogden/Salt Lake City area. The station is currently owned by Faith Communications Corporation.

KANN signed on in December 1961 on 1250 kHz. In 1967, it moved to 1090 kHz and to 1120 kHz in 1989. In its early days on the 1090 kHz frequency, the station operated as a 1 kW daytimer, meaning it was required to sign off at sunset to protect clear-channel stations. The eventual move to 1120 kHz allowed the station to upgrade its facilities, broadcasting with 10,000 watts during the day and 1,100 watts at night. It was originally licensed to nearby Ogden.

KANN's skywave signal has been reported in Flagstaff, Arizona. KANN is one of the primary full-powered stations of the SOS Radio Network, which broadcasts across several western states, including Nevada, California, Arizona, Utah, Idaho, Wyoming, New Mexico, and Montana. The station is also available online.

On November 1st, 2026, KANN went silent after the land that the station's towers sat on was sold to the State of Utah. Faith Communications Corporation will pursue an alternative broadcast site, but it is highly unlikely that the station will ever return to the air.

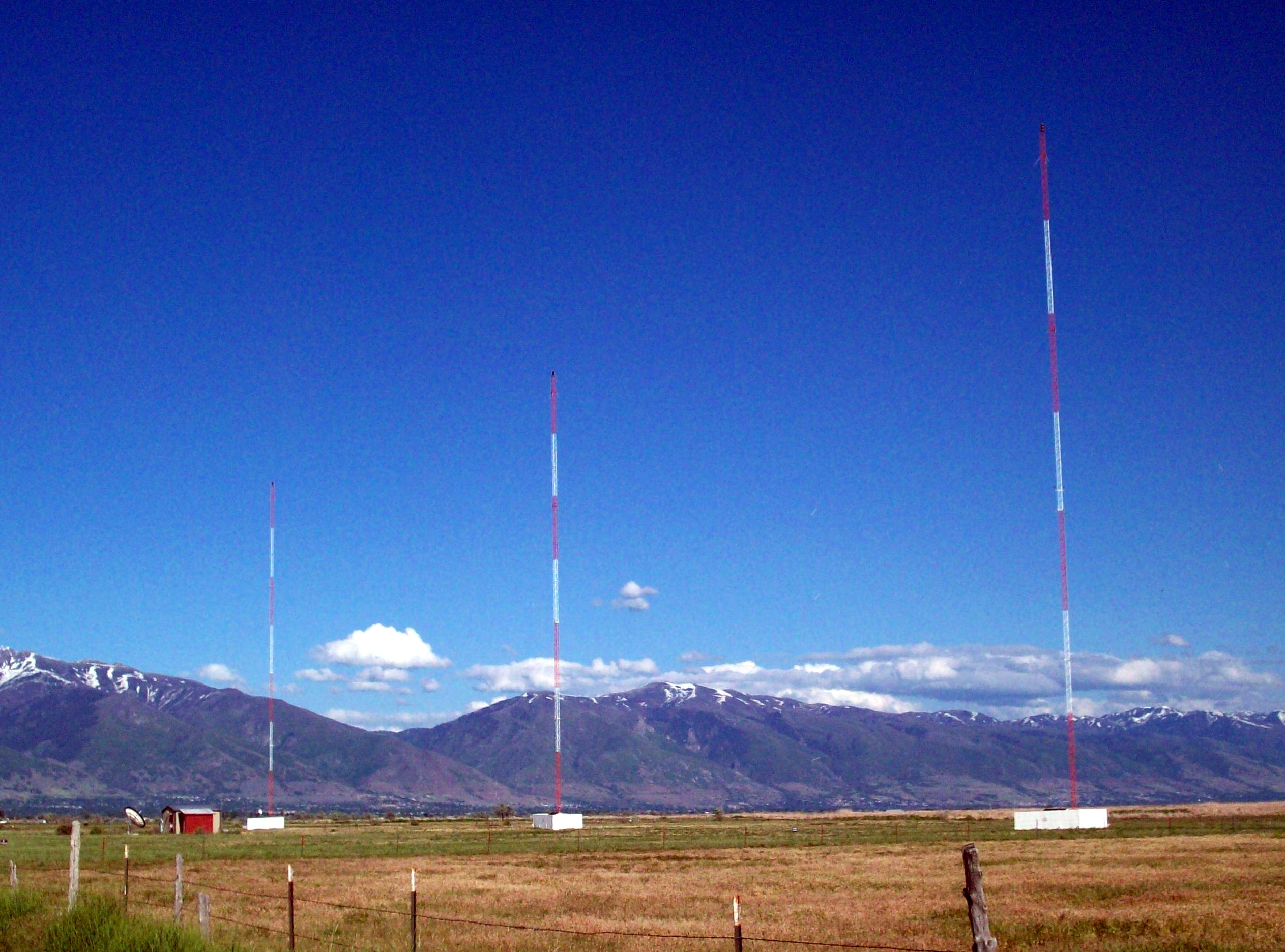
The radio towers for KANN 1120, outside Syracuse, Utah.
