= KSQS =

- Ririe, Idaho; United States
- Broadcast area: Idaho Falls
- Frequency: 91.7 MHz

Programming
- Format: Contemporary Christian
- Affiliations: Sounds of the Spirit

Ownership
- Owner: Faith Communications Corp.
- Sister stations: KSOS, KHMS, KCIR, KMZO, KMZL, KANN

History
- First air date: 1998-12-15

Technical information
- Licensing authority: FCC
- Facility ID: 92376
- Class: A
- ERP: 250 watts
- HAAT: 162.2 meters
- Transmitter coordinates: 43°32′37″N 111°53′7″W

Links
- Public license information: Public file; LMS
- Website: sosradio.net

KSQS (91.7 FM) is a radio station broadcasting a Contemporary Christian format. Licensed to Ririe, Idaho, United States, the station serves the Idaho Falls area. The station is currently owned by Faith Communications Corp.

== History ==
The station went on the air as KSQS on 1998-12-15.
