= KEZJ =

KEZJ may refer to:

- KEZJ-FM, a radio station (95.7 FM) licensed to Twin Falls, Idaho, United States
- KEZJ (AM), a radio station (1450 AM) licensed to Twin Falls, Idaho, United States
