= KSKI-FM =

Radio station in Sun Valley, Idaho

Coordinates: 43.643°N 114.398°W

- Sun Valley, Idaho; United States
- Broadcast area: Sun Valley, Idaho
- Frequency: 94.5 MHz
- Branding: 94.5 K-SKI

Programming
- Format: Alternative rock

Ownership
- Owner: Richard Mecham; (Magic Valley Media, LLC)

History
- First air date: August 3, 1977 (at 93.5)
- Former frequencies: 93.5 MHz (1977–1991); 103.7 MHz (1991–2013)
- Call sign meaning: "Ski"

Technical information
- Licensing authority: FCC
- Facility ID: 60391
- Class: C1
- ERP: 2,500 watts
- HAAT: 583 meters (1,913 ft)
- Translator: 103.1 K276DW (Ketchum)

Links
- Public license information: Public file; LMS
- Webcast: Listen Live
- Website: 945kski.com

KSKI-FM (94.5 FM) is a commercial radio station located in Sun Valley, Idaho. The station was assigned the KSKI-FM call letters by the Federal Communications Commission on June 2, 1980.

== History ==
KSKI-FM went on the air August 3, 1977, on 93.5 MHz, the sister to KSKI AM 1340. It broadcast from a tower atop Bald Mountain. Within three months of signing on, it changed its automation format; automation complemented its diverse block programming lineup. KSKI-AM-FM were known for their eclectic mix of music programming, aiming to serve listeners in a market that had no other radio stations; the pair also gained a small but devoted audience in the larger Twin Falls area.

In November 1989, KSKI-AM-FM was sold to Silver Creek Communications, a company of businessman John McCaw, Jr., for $950,000; while McCaw owned cable systems and was in the middle of acquiring TV station group LIN Broadcasting, his other radio holdings were all in Alaska. KSKI-FM moved to 103.7 MHz at a much higher power level, improving reception in the Magic Valley area, in 1991. The AM sister station continued to operate until late 1992, when economic difficulties in the local advertising market caused by the launch of competing station KECH-FM, which had taken to the air in 1988, prompted Silver Creek to shutter the AM station and send the license to the Federal Communications Commission for cancellation. The difficulties also would prompt changes for KSKI-FM in February 1993, when Silver Creek converted the operations of KSKI-FM to an automated service known as "The Mountain", programmed specifically for ski resort areas with special Sun Valley-specific inserts from its base at KZYR in Colorado; it was the service's first non-owned affiliate. The layoffs included KSKI-FM's program director, DJs and a news director, while sales staff and a local news reporter remained in Hailey.

In 1994, KSKI was bought by Idaho state senator Clint Stennett, who owned a cable channel known as KWRV. Stennett unhooked KSKI from "The Mountain" and instituted a live and local adult album alternative format. The station made national headlines three years later when an admiring listener brought the station's morning DJs banana bread that they ate without knowing it was laced with marijuana; the employees were suspended with pay after having remained on the air under the influence, while a 28-year-old Ketchum man was arrested and the station retooled its morning show. Stennett also instituted a drug policy.

1998 brought consolidation when cross town rival station KECH-FM (owned then by Scott Parker’s Alpine Broadcasting, Ltd) bought KSKI, bringing both of Blaine County's radio stations under common ownership; KSKI's studios relocated from Hailey to Ketchum as a result.

KSKI flipped to a wider hot adult contemporary music format in 2002; the station returned to adult album alternative in October 2008.

== Ownership ==
In March 2007, Denver-based Blue Point Media announced that it was set to merge with KSKI-FM owner Chaparral Broadcasting, Inc. Chaparral Broadcasting also owns KECH-FM and KYZK in Idaho as well as four stations in Jackson Hole, Wyoming.

The FCC approved the transfer of the license on May 24, 2007, however no consummation notice has been filed with the FCC as required by law, and as of January 2009, the license remains in the name of Chaparral Broadcasting.

Chaparral sold KSKI-FM and seven other stations to Rich Broadcasting for $3.7 million; the transaction was consummated on April 1, 2013.

On December 5, 2013, the station moved from 103.7 FM to its current 94.5 FM.

Rich Broadcasting sold KSKI-FM, three other stations, and a translator to Richard Mecham's Magic Valley Media, LLC effective September 17, 2019, for $475,000.

On November 1, 2019, KSKI-FM dropped its adult album alternative format and began stunting with Christmas music. Later until January, it stunted with a loop of two songs,"New Year's Day" by U2 and "Auld Lang Syne" by Celtic Woman.

On January 1, 2020, KSKI-FM ended the Christmas music stunt and launched an alternative rock format.
