= KUMC =

KUMC may refer to:

- KUMC-LP, a radio station
- University of Kansas Medical Center, a medical center in Kansas City, Kansas, United States
