= KLCW =

KLCW may refer to:

- KLCW-LP, a defunct low-power radio station (105.5 FM) formerly licensed to serve Hailey, Idaho, United States
- KLCW-TV, a television station (channel 23, virtual 22) licensed to serve Wolfforth, Texas, United States
