= KBYI =

Public radio station at BYU-Idaho in Rexburg, Idaho

- Rexburg, Idaho; United States
- Broadcast area: Idaho Falls - Eastern Idaho
- Frequency: 94.3 MHz (HD Radio)
- Branding: BYU-Idaho Radio, 94.3 FM

Programming
- Format: Public Radio - Classical music

Ownership
- Owner: Brigham Young University-Idaho
- Sister stations: KBYR-FM

History
- First air date: 1972 (as KRIC)
- Former call signs: KRIC (1972–2001); KPRI (February–March 2001)
- Call sign meaning: Brigham Young/Idaho

Technical information
- Facility ID: 56345
- Class: C1
- ERP: 100,000 watts
- HAAT: 211 meters (692 ft)
- Transmitter coordinates: 43°45′44″N 111°57′33″W
- Translator: See § Translators

Links
- Website: www.byui.edu/radio

KBYI (94.3 FM) is a public radio station in Rexburg, Idaho. It is one of two terrestrial radio stations owned by Brigham Young University-Idaho, which is an arm of the Church of Jesus Christ of Latter-day Saints (LDS). It has a radio format of classical music along with news and information from NPR. The main signal covers Eastern Idaho, with rebroadcasting stations around Idaho, Wyoming and Montana.

KBYI has an effective radiated power (ERP) of 100,000 watts, the maximum for FM stations. The transmitter is in Menan near the Snake River.

== Programming ==
Promoted as "The Music You Want, The News You Need", KBYI broadcasts classical music programming, along with Morning Edition, All Things Considered, and a limited number of LDS-focused religious programming. Local news is planned and produced by BYU-Idaho students. Some 20 students work for BYU-Idaho Radio each semester. Sister station 91.5 KBYR-FM maintains a religious format.

== History ==
KBYI logo used until March 2011.

KRIC signed on at then-Ricks College in September 1972. It was a 10-watt station on 90.1 MHz. In May 1984, KRIC moved to 100.5 MHz and increased its power to 75,000 watts.

In 2011, KBYI moved to 94.3 MHz. The move was part of a multi-state, multi-station series of changes in frequency assignments, which included three swaps in Rexburg and Idaho Falls. The 94.3 frequency was vacated by KSNA, which moved to 99.1; the 99.1 license of KUPI-FM moved to 100.7; and KBYI moved to 94.3.

== Translators ==
KBYI maintains an extensive translator network with many dependent translators in Idaho, Montana and Wyoming.

Broadcast translators for KBYI
Call sign	Frequency	City of license	FID	FCC info
K215FV	90.9 FM	Idaho Falls, Idaho	146541	LMS
K220GV	91.9 FM	West Yellowstone, Montana	89945	LMS
K258BK	99.5 FM	Fremont County, Idaho	145649	LMS
K266AU	101.1 FM	West Yellowstone, Montana	155904	LMS
K278BY	103.5 FM	Soda Springs, Idaho	146559	LMS
K280EG	103.9 FM	Freedom, Wyoming	56354	LMS
K285CO	104.9 FM	Pocatello, Idaho	56347	LMS
K285DF	104.9 FM	Afton, Wyoming	56349	LMS
K290BT	105.9 FM	Jackson, Wyoming	56344	LMS
K296GL	107.1 FM	Teton County, Wyoming	145607	LMS
K297AB	107.3 FM	Burley, Idaho	56346	LMS

K266AU is owned by Ted W. Austin.
