= KIYE =

Kamiah, Idaho; United States
- Frequency: 88.7 MHz
- Branding: Voice of the NiMiiPuu

Programming
- Format: Variety

Ownership
- Owner: Nez Perce Tribe

History
- First air date: 2010

Technical information
- Licensing authority: FCC
- Facility ID: 174013
- Class: C3
- ERP: 15,000 watts
- HAAT: 94 metres (308 ft)
- Transmitter coordinates: 45°15′9″N 116°24′40″W
- Repeaters: KIYE-1 88.7 (Kamiah); K288EU 105.5 (Lapwai)

Links
- Public license information: Public file; LMS
- Webcast: Listen live
- Website: http://kiye.org

KIYE (88.7 FM) is a radio station licensed to serve the community of Kamiah, Idaho. The station is owned by the Nez Perce Tribe. It airs a variety format. The station's main transmitter is located near Craigmont, Idaho.

The station was assigned the KIYE call letters on January 28, 2010, by the Federal Communications Commission.

== See also ==
- List of radio stations in Idaho
- List of community radio stations in the United States
