= KMZL =

Missoula, Montana; United States
- Frequency: 91.1 MHz

Programming
- Format: Contemporary Christian
- Affiliations: Sounds of the Spirit

Ownership
- Owner: Faith Communications Corp.
- Sister stations: KSOS, KHMS, KCIR, KMZO, KANN

History
- First air date: February 20, 1998
- Call sign meaning: "Missoula"

Technical information
- Licensing authority: FCC
- Facility ID: 78721
- Class: C2
- ERP: 2,200 watts
- HAAT: 626 meters (2055 feet)
- Transmitter coordinates: 46°48′09″N 113°58′21″W

Links
- Public license information: Public file; LMS
- Website: http://www.sosradio.net/

KMZL (91.1 FM) is a non-commercial radio station licensed to serve Missoula, Montana. The station is owned by Faith Communications Corp. It airs a Contemporary Christian music format. The station is an affiliate of the Sounds of the Spirit Radio Network.

The station was assigned the KMZL call letters by the Federal Communications Commission on February 20, 1998.

== License upgrade ==
On November 9, 2007, the FCC granted this station a construction permit to upgrade to a Class C1 licensed with an effective radiated power of 2,200 watts. On September 25, 2010, KMZL was granted a license to transmit at an effective radiated power of 2,200 watts.

== Translators ==
Call sign	Frequency	City of license	FID	ERP (W)	HAAT	FCC info
K257DJ	90.7 FM	Salmon, ID	10893	47	936 m (3,071 ft)	LMS
