= KZKY =

Radio station in Ucon–Idaho Falls, Idaho

Simulcasts KPKY, Pocatello
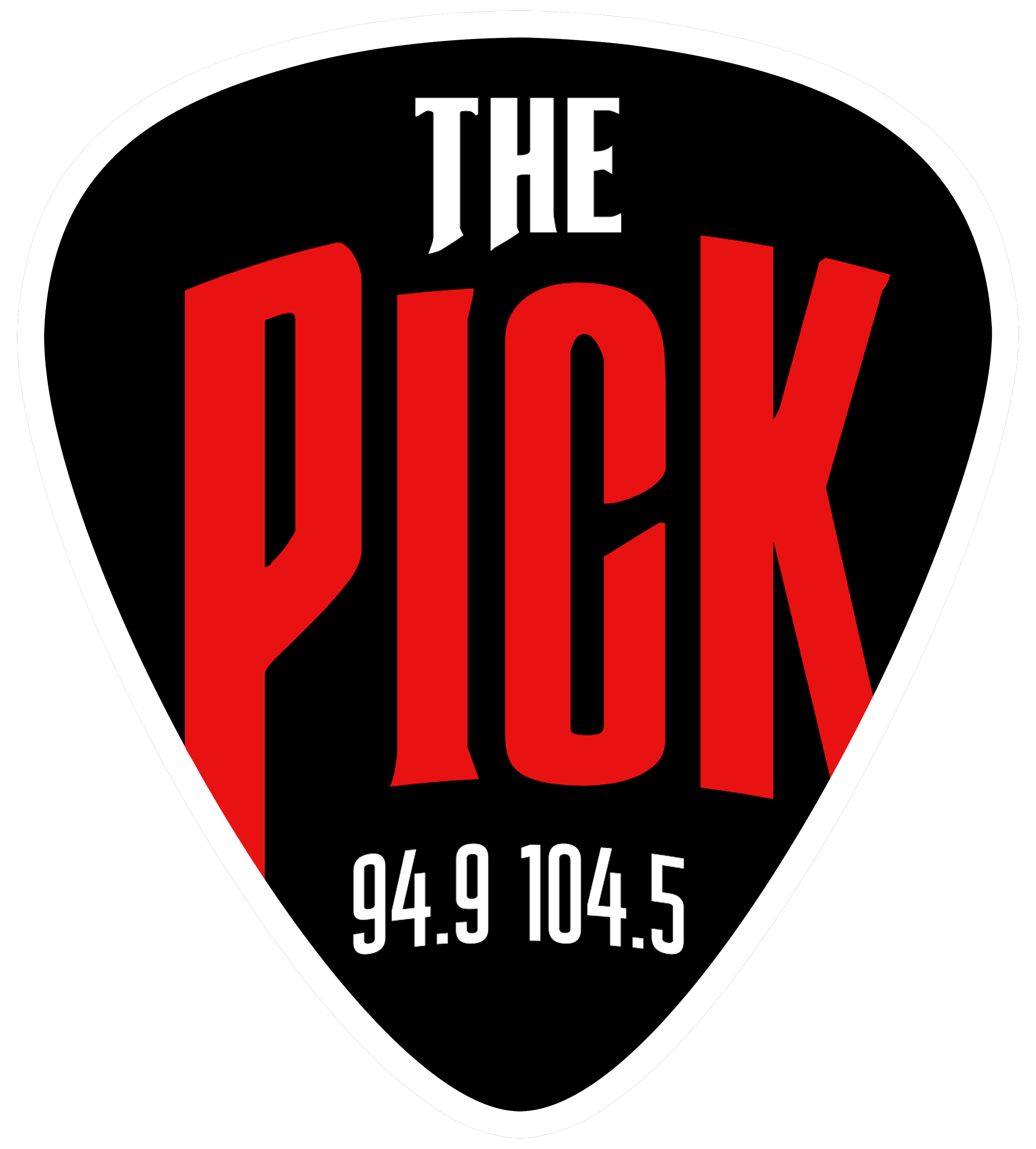
- Ucon, Idaho; United States
- Broadcast area: Idaho Falls, Idaho
- Frequency: 104.5 MHz
- Branding: 94.9 & 104.5 The Pick

Programming
- Format: Classic rock (KPKY simulcast)

Ownership
- Owner: Rich Broadcasting; (Rich Broadcasting Idaho LS, LLC)
- Sister stations: KWFO-FM

History
- First air date: 2010

Technical information
- Licensing authority: FCC
- Facility ID: 164126
- Class: C2
- ERP: 37,000 watts
- HAAT: 173 meters
- Transmitter coordinates: 43°32′34″N 111°53′7″W

Links
- Public license information: Public file; LMS
- Webcast: Listen Live
- Website: pickidaho.com

KZKY (104.5 FM) is a radio station licensed to Ucon, Idaho, United States. The station is owned by Rich Broadcasting, through licensee Rich Broadcasting Idaho LS, LLC.

On February 3, 2012, KZKY signed on the air with a classic rock format, simulcasting KPKY 94.9 FM Pocatello, Idaho.
