= Utah Jazz Radio Network =

American radio network

- Type: Radio network
- Country: United States
- Headquarters: Salt Lake City, Utah
- Broadcast area: Utah; Idaho
- Owner: Utah Jazz
- Official website: Utah Jazz Broadcast Information

The Utah Jazz Radio Network is an American radio network consisting of 11 English language and one Spanish language radio stations which each carry coverage of the Utah Jazz, a professional basketball club which is a member of the National Basketball Association (NBA).

The network's flagship radio stations are "The Sports Zone," KZNS/1280 and KZNS-FM 97.5. The network has affiliate stations in Utah and Idaho. David Locke has been the English radio play-by-play announcer since 2009, after leaving the play-by-play position with the Seattle SuperSonics. Former Jazz player Ron Boone is the English color analyst.

The network's Spanish flagship station is KTUB 1600 AM. Nelson Morán is the Spanish-language play-by-play announcer/color analyst, Isidro Lopez is the Spanish-language play-by-play announcer, and Nicole Hernandez is the Spanish-language color analyst/sideline reporter.

The radio network broadcasts all preseason and all 82 regular season games.

== Station list ==
=== English language stations ===
==== Utah ====
Callsign	Frequency	Location
KZNS	1280 AM	Salt Lake City (flagship)
KZNS-FM	97.5 FM	Coalville
KSL	1160 AM	Salt Lake City
KSL-FM	102.7 FM	Midvale
KLGN	1390 AM	Logan
KCPX	1490 AM	Moab
KMGR	99.1 FM	Nephi
KOAL	750 AM	Price
KVEL	920 AM	Vernal

==== Arizona ====
Callsign	Frequency	Location
KDXU-FM	101.9 FM	Colorado City

==== Idaho ====
Callsign	Frequency	Location
KPKY	104.5 FM	Pocatello

=== Spanish language stations ===
==== Wyoming ====
Callsign	Frequency	Location
KBMG	106.3 FM	Evanston
