= KZDX =

Coordinates: 42.335°N 113.605°W

- Burley, Idaho; United States
- Broadcast area: Magic Valley
- Frequency: 99.9 MHz
- Branding: Hot 100 FM

Programming
- Format: Hot AC

Ownership
- Owner: Lee Family Stations
- Sister stations: KART, KBAR, KEDJ, KKMV, KKRK, KXTA-FM

History
- First air date: February 15, 1975; 51 years ago
- Former call signs: KBAR-FM (1975–1978); KMVC (1978–1984)
- Former frequencies: 98.3 MHz (1975–1984)

Technical information
- Licensing authority: FCC
- Facility ID: 42885
- Class: C
- ERP: 27,000 watts
- HAAT: 746.8 meters (2,450 ft)

Links
- Public license information: Public file; LMS
- Webcast: Listen Live
- Website: hot100now.com

KZDX (99.9 FM, "Hot 100 FM") is a commercial radio station located in Burley, Idaho, broadcasting to the Twin Falls, Idaho, area. KZDX airs a hot adult contemporary music format.

In the later 1980s and early 1990s, “Superstation” 99.9 KZDX was one of two Contemporary Hits stations in the market. In the mid-1990s, it was rebranded as “Hits 99.9” before becoming “The Buzz” with a more Rock-leaning sound.

On September 12, 2011, after years of playing a pop/Modern Rock hybrid as 99.9 the Buzz, KZDX tweaked to a more conventional Hot AC format. The station is now known as the new Hot 100. The station still airs Rick Dees and Absolutely 1980s on the weekends. At night the station leans more CHR by adding some Rhythmic product to compete against rival KTPZ.

KZDX is owned by Lee Family Stations.
