= KLCZ =

Simulcasting KBSX Boise
- Lewiston, Idaho; United States
- Broadcast area: Lewiston–Clarkston metropolitan area
- Frequency: 88.9 MHz
- Branding: Boise State Public Radio

Programming
- Format: Public radio; news/talk
- Network: Boise State Public Radio
- Affiliations: NPR

Ownership
- Owner: Idaho State Board of Education

History
- First air date: 1967
- Former call signs: KLHS (1967–2007)

Technical information
- Licensing authority: FCC
- Facility ID: 28532
- Class: A
- ERP: 230 watts
- HAAT: −256 meters (−840 ft)
- Transmitter coordinates: 46°24′45″N 117°1′31″W

Links
- Public license information: Public file; LMS
- Webcast: Listen live
- Website: www.boisestatepublicradio.org

KLCZ (88.9 FM) is a public radio station broadcasting a news/talk format, simulcasting KBSX from Boise as part of Boise State Public Radio. Licensed to Lewiston, Idaho, United States, the radio station serves the Lewiston–Clarkston metropolitan area. The station is owned by the Idaho State Board of Education.

== History ==
On February 1, 2007, the station changed its call sign from KLHS to KLCZ.

In mid-October 2022, KLCZ switched from freeform college radio (which continues online-only) to a simulcast of Boise State Public Radio's news/talk-formatted KBSX from Boise. Effective November 21, 2022, the Idaho State Board of Education consummated Lewis–Clark State College's donation of the station's license.
