= KXTA-FM =

Radio station in Gooding, Idaho

Coordinates: 43.2450°N 115.4380°W

- Gooding, Idaho; United States
- Broadcast area: Twin Falls/Sun Valley, Idaho
- Frequency: 99.1 MHz (HD Radio)
- Branding: 99.1 La Perrona

Programming
- Format: Regional Mexican
- Subchannels: HD2: Radio by Grace (Christian radio); HD3: Mega 97.5 (Bilingual CHR); HD4: K-Love (Contemporary Christian)

Ownership
- Owner: Kim & Jami Lee; (Lee Family Broadcasting, Inc.)
- Sister stations: KART, KBAR, KEDJ, KKMV, KKRK, KXCD, KZDX

History
- First air date: 1996 (as KMXM at 100.7)
- Former call signs: KAKO (1995–1996); KMXM (1996–2000); KIJZ (2000–2002); KHJR (2002–2003); KISY (2003–2006); KAYN (2006–2008); KQLZ (2008); KPDA (2008–2010); KPDA-FM (2010–2013); KINF (2013–2014); KXTA (2014–2015)
- Former frequencies: 100.7 MHz (1996–2013)

Technical information
- Licensing authority: FCC
- Facility ID: 28128
- Class: C1
- ERP: 35,000 watts
- HAAT: 232 meters (761 ft)
- Translators: HD2: 97.1 K246DC (Kimberly); HD3: 97.5 K248BZ (Kimberly); HD4: 92.1 K221FT (Twin Falls)
- Repeater: 93.5 KXCD (Fairfield)

Links
- Public license information: Public file; LMS
- Webcast: Listen Live; Listen Live (HD2); Listen Live (HD3)
- Website: 991laperrona.com radiobygrace.com (HD2) mega975.com

KXTA-FM (99.1 MHz) is a commercial radio station located in Gooding, Idaho, broadcasting to the Twin Falls/Sun Valley, Idaho area. KXTA-FM airs a Regional Mexican format. KXTA-FM is known as "99.1 La Perrona."

Logo before 93.5 simulcast

== KXTA-HD2 ==
On February 4, 2019, KXTA-HD3 changed their format from top 40/CHR as Club 97.5, to bilingual CHR, branded as "LatinX 97.5".

== KXTA-HD3 ==
On July 28, 2023 KXTA-HD3 dropped the "LatinX" Bilingual CHR format and began stunting with all-Bad Bunny as "Conejo 97.5", with a new format to launch on July 31.

On July 31, 2023 KXTA-HD3 ended stunting and launched a Bilingual CHR format, branded as "Mega 97.5".
