= KRXR =

- Filer, Idaho; United States
- Broadcast area: Twin Falls, and surrounding area.
- Frequency: 1480 kHz
- Branding: Radio Fiesta La 101.3 - 1480

Programming
- Format: Regional Mexican

Ownership
- Owner: Maria Elena Juarez

History
- Former call signs: KIDI (1985–1986)

Technical information
- Licensing authority: FCC
- Facility ID: 2805
- Class: D
- Power: 1,300 watts day 80 watts night
- Transmitter coordinates: 42°43′38.60″N 114°37′39.70″W
- Repeater: 940 KDIL (Jerome)

Links
- Public license information: Public file; LMS

KRXR (1480 AM) is a radio station broadcasting a Regional Mexican format. Licensed to Gooding, Idaho, United States, the station serves the Twin Falls area. The station is currently owned by Maria Elena Juarez. In fact the transmitter site in Gooding has been demolished and the station now comes from the KDIL site in Jerome - well to the South. The FCC now registers the location as Filer ID.

The format is simulcast on KDIL 940 AM & 94.3 FM (translator).

== History ==
The station was assigned the call letters KIDI on April 24, 1985. On May 9, 1986, the station changed its call sign to the current KRXR.
