= KVAB =

- Clarkston, Washington; United States
- Broadcast area: Lewiston, Idaho
- Frequency: 102.9 MHz
- Branding: Classic Rock 102.9

Programming
- Format: Classic rock
- Affiliations: Westwood One

Ownership
- Owner: Pacific Empire Radio Corporation
- Sister stations: KCLK, KCLK-FM

History
- First air date: 1997

Technical information
- Licensing authority: FCC
- Facility ID: 26862
- Class: A
- ERP: 440 watts
- HAAT: 357 meters (1,171 ft)
- Transmitter coordinates: 46°27′27″N 117°6′3″W

Links
- Public license information: Public file; LMS
- Website: KVAB Online

KVAB (102.9 FM) is a radio station broadcasting a classic rock format, licensed to Clarkston, Washington, United States. The station is owned by Pacific Empire Radio Corporation and features programming from Westwood One.
