= KSEI =

Radio station in Pocatello, Idaho

- Pocatello, Idaho; United States
- Broadcast area: Pocatello, Idaho
- Frequency: 930 kHz
- Branding: News Talk KSEI

Programming
- Format: Conservative talk
- Affiliations: Salem Radio Network

Ownership
- Owner: Paul Anderson; (Idaho Wireless Corporation)

History
- First air date: 1926
- Call sign meaning: South East Idaho

Technical information
- Licensing authority: FCC
- Facility ID: 51216
- Class: B
- Power: 5,000 watts
- Transmitter coordinates: 42°57′43.7″N 112°29′52.9″W
- Translator: 98.9 K255DD (Pocatello)
- Repeater: 104.1 KORR-HD3 (American Falls)

Links
- Public license information: Public file; LMS

KSEI (930 AM) is a radio station broadcasting a conservative talk format. Licensed to Pocatello, Idaho, United States, the station serves the Pocatello area. The station is owned by Paul Anderson, through licensee Idaho Wireless Corporation. KSEI serves as the flagship station for Idaho State and broadcast football and men's basketball games live.

== History ==
KSEI's history dates back to 1926, and for many years the station was East Idaho's NBC affiliate.

On August 15, 1947, KSEI increased its power to 5 kW full-time. It had been operating with 1 kW during the day and 250 W at night. Also on that day, KSEI-FM began broadcasting on 96.5 MHz. KSEI was the dominant Top 40 station for the Pocatello area from the 1960s through the 1970s and 1980s. Its AM broadcast signal at night could be heard throughout the Intermountain West.

The station was sold, along with sister station KMGI, by Pacific Empire Radio to Idaho Wireless Corporation in November 2014. The studios were relocated at the same time. The purchase was consummated on July 9, 2015, at a price of $850,000.

On July 27, 2020, KSEI changed their format from oldies to conservative talk, branded as "News Talk KSEI", with programming from Salem Media Group.
