= KOUU =

Radio station in Pocatello, Idaho

- Pocatello, Idaho; United States
- Frequency: 1290 kHz
- Branding: Country Classics 1290 AM/96.5 FM

Programming
- Format: Classic Country
- Affiliations: ABC Radio

Ownership
- Owner: Idaho Wireless Corporation

History
- First air date: November 21, 1956
- Former call signs: KYTE (1956–1962); KSNN (1962–1978); KISU (1978–1981); KZBQ (1981–1995)

Technical information
- Licensing authority: FCC
- Facility ID: 28255
- Class: D
- Power: 50,000 watts day; 24 watts night
- Transmitter coordinates: 42°57′28″N 112°25′46″W
- Translator: see below

Links
- Public license information: Public file; LMS
- Website: countryclassicsidaho.com

KOUU (1290 AM) is a radio station broadcasting a classic country music format, as well as local high school sports events. Licensed to Pocatello, Idaho, United States, the station is currently owned by Idaho Wireless Corporation and features programming from ABC Radio.

== History ==
The station went on the air as KYTE on November 21, 1956. J. Ronald Bayton, the original owner of the independent, music-minded KYTE, sold the station a year later for $60,000 to Thomas R. and A. H. Becker of Newport, Oregon.

Further changes came during 1961 and 1962, when KYTE moved from its original base to a new downtown studio, reopened after a month's silence under new management, and changed its call letters to KSNN on February 26, 1962. The new managers, Tommy Thompson and Daniel C. Libeg, also acquired the station itself: in 1965, Libeg bought out Thompson's share in KSNN.

After a vandalism attempt in April 1967 in which someone shot out the tower lights with a .22-caliber rifle, the station sought approval to move its transmitter site as part of a $100,000 expansion that also included new studio facilities and the construction of an FM station at 93.7 MHz, KSNN-FM. The new offices opened in September 1968, while the FM outlet launched in 1969. KSNN also was hit with a lawsuit from the Associated Press in July 1969 for failure to pay a wire service bill.

While the AM and FM outlets simulcast for the latter's first years in operation, the two stations split the simulcast in 1977, with the FM continuing to offer a Top 40 format while the AM flipped to oldies.

In March 1978, KSNN-AM-FM was sold to the KSNN Broadcasting Company, composed primarily of three businessmen from Hutchinson, Kansas, for $159,000. The new ownership changed the call letters of the AM station to KISU on May 1. A format change in April 1981 resulted in new KZBQ call letters, allowing the television station at Idaho State University to pick up the KISU-TV calls later that year.

KZBQ was acquired by its current owners, Idaho Wireless, in 1985 for $325,000; by this time, it ran an adult contemporary format.

On January 23, 1995, the station changed its call sign to the current KOUU, call letters that had resided on the then-unbuilt 104.1 station at American Falls which became KORR.

== Translators ==
Three translators are listed as associated with the KOUU license:

Broadcast translators for KOUU
Call sign	Frequency	City of license	FID	ERP (W)	HAAT	Class	FCC info
K243CJ	96.5 FM	Pocatello	153928	99	61 m (200 ft)	D	LMS
K275BL	102.9 FM	Pocatello	152298	99	64 m (210 ft)	D	LMS
K294CD	106.7 FM	Pocatello	152582	250	485 m (1,591 ft)	D	LMS
