= KCIR =

Radio station in Twin Falls, Idaho

- Twin Falls, Idaho; United States
- Broadcast area: Twin Falls area
- Frequency: 90.7 MHz
- Branding: SOS Radio Network

Programming
- Format: Contemporary Christian
- Affiliations: Salem Communications

Ownership
- Owner: Faith Communications Corporation
- Sister stations: KSOS, KHMS, KSQS, KMZO, KMZL, KANN

History
- First air date: December 12, 1982
- Call sign meaning: Christ is Risen

Technical information
- Licensing authority: FCC
- Facility ID: 20532
- Class: C
- ERP: 44,100 watts
- HAAT: 762 meters (2,500 ft)
- Transmitter coordinates: 42°20′7″N 113°36′17″W

Links
- Public license information: Public file; LMS
- Website: sosradio.net

KCIR (90.7 FM) is a radio station broadcasting a Contemporary Christian format. Licensed to Twin Falls, Idaho, United States, the station serves the Twin Falls (Sun Valley) area. The station is currently owned by Faith Communications Corp.

== History ==
Following a merger between Christian Radio and Faith Communications, KCIR signed on the air on December 12, 1982 and began early transmissions on December 9.

== Translators ==
Call sign	Frequency	City of license	FID	ERP (W)	HAAT	FCC info
K204CC	88.7 FM	Challis, Idaho	10104	10	760 m (2,493 ft)	LMS
K209BO	89.7 FM	Tetonia, Idaho	20545	10	580 m (1,903 ft)	LMS
K204AL	88.7 FM	Pocatello, Idaho	20513	29	281 m (922 ft)	LMS
K221DT	92.1 FM	Thayne, Wyoming	86134	10	702 m (2,303 ft)	LMS
