= KLLP =

- Blackfoot, Idaho; United States
- Broadcast area: Pocatello, Idaho
- Frequency: 98.5 MHz
- Branding: Star 98

Programming
- Format: Classic hits

Ownership
- Owner: Rich Broadcasting; (Rich Broadcasting Idaho LS, LLC)

History
- First air date: 1984
- Former call signs: KRCD (1986–1987); KRSS (1991–1998)

Technical information
- Licensing authority: FCC
- Facility ID: 8413
- Class: C2
- ERP: 7,400 watts
- HAAT: 301 meters
- Transmitter coordinates: 42°52′26″N 112°30′48″W

Links
- Public license information: Public file; LMS
- Webcast: Listen Live
- Website: star98radio.com

KLLP (98.5 FM, "Star 98") is a radio station licensed to Blackfoot, Idaho, United States; the station serves the Pocatello area. The station is currently owned by Rich Broadcasting.

== History ==
The station was assigned the calls KRCD on 1986-05-01. It was originally at 98.3 with a Contemporary Hits format. On 1991-11-01 it changed to KRSS “Cross” at 98.5 with a Christian format. On 1998-11-09 the station changed to the current KLLP call letters, first branded as “K-Lite” with an Adult Contemporary format. By the early 2000s, it became “Star 98.5” with its current Hot Adult Contemporary format.

On May 3, 2025, KGTM and KLLP began stunting with an hour-long, including commercial breaks, sound collage hinting at a relaunch of the "Star 98" brand under a classic hits format, including snippets of songs with the words "star" or "change" in the title or overall theme, as well as snippets of random vintage music and pop culture audio clips from between the 1970s and 2000s and several songs themed around either national or Idaho state patriotism, all punctuated with sweepers warning listeners that the relaunched format would launch the following Monday, May 5, at Noon. At that time, KGTM and KLLP launched a classic hits format, still under the "Star 98" branding.
