= KWFI-FM =

- Aberdeen, Idaho; United States
- Broadcast area: Idaho Falls-Pocatello, Idaho
- Frequency: 96.1 MHz
- Branding: 96.1 & 102.1 The Wolf

Programming
- Format: Country

Ownership
- Owner: Rich Broadcasting; (Rich Broadcasting Idaho LS, LLC)

History
- First air date: 1965
- Former call signs: KID-FM (1965–1989); KSIF (1989–1991); KMXE (1991–1992); KID-FM (1992–2018)
- Call sign meaning: The Wolf Idaho

Technical information
- Licensing authority: FCC
- Facility ID: 22195
- Class: C
- ERP: 100,000 watts
- HAAT: 458 meters (1,503 ft)
- Transmitter coordinates: 43°29′51″N 112°39′50″W
- Repeater: 102.1 KWFO-FM (Driggs)

Links
- Public license information: Public file; LMS
- Webcast: Listen live
- Website: wolfidaho.com

KWFI-FM is a commercial radio station located in Aberdeen, Idaho, broadcasting on 96.1 FM. KWFI-FM airs a country music format simulcast with KWFO-FM 102.1 in Driggs as "96.1 & 102.1 The Wolf".

== History ==
On September 26, 2011, the then-KID-FM rebranded from "The Bull" to "River Country", and began simulcasting with KCHQ (102.1 FM) in Driggs, Idaho.

On October 25, 2018, KID-FM rebranded from "River Country" to "The Wolf". The station changed its call sign to KWFI-FM on November 26, 2018.

== Ownership ==
In October 2007, a deal was reached for KID-FM to be acquired by GAP Broadcasting II LLC (Samuel Weller, president) from Clear Channel Communications as part of a 57 station deal with a total reported sale price of $74.78 million. What eventually became GapWest Broadcasting was folded into Townsquare Media on August 13, 2010; Townsquare, in turn, sold its Idaho Falls–Pocatello stations to Rich Broadcasting in 2011.
