= Boise State Public Radio =

Public radio network in Idaho, United States

- Country: United States
- Headquarters: Boise, Idaho

Programming
- Format: Public radio

Ownership
- Owner: Boise State University

History
- Launch date: 1976 (originally carrier current 1957–1976)

Links
- Webcast: Listen live
- Website: www.boisestatepublicradio.org

Boise State Public Radio (BSPR) is a broadcast service of Boise State University, which operates four programming services on several radio stations throughout central and southern Idaho and northern Nevada. Its headquarters are located at the Ron and Linda Yanke Family Research Park near the BSU campus on East Parkcenter Boulevard in southeast Boise.

== Stations and services ==
KBSU in Boise, Idaho, airs classical music and other entertainment programming from American Public Media (APM) and Public Radio Exchange (PRX). KBSX, also located in Boise, airs news and information programming from NPR, PRX, APM and the BBC, as well as locally produced news and information programs, including the nationally distributed program Reader's Corner with Bob Kustra.

KBSW in Twin Falls, Idaho, airs a mix of programming from KBSU and KBSX, as well as some local programming produced at a satellite studio at the Fine Arts Building on the campus of the College of Southern Idaho on Falls Avenue in north Twin Falls.

A full-time jazz format, named "Idaho's Jazz Station," airs on KBSK in McCall, and on the second HD Radio channel of KBSU. This format aired on KBSU (730 AM) and KEZJ (1450 AM) prior to July 2007.

Boise State Public Radio is the lead station for the Mountain West News Bureau, a partnership of stations providing news coverage of the Rocky Mountain West.

| Location | Frequency | Call sign | ERP W | Height m (ft) | Format | FCC info |
|---|---|---|---|---|---|---|
| Boise | 90.3 FM (HD) | KBSU | 17,500 | 827 m (2,713 ft) | Classical | FCC (KBSU) |
| Boise | 91.5 FM | KBSX | 3,800 | 827 m (2,713 ft) | News/talk | FCC (KBSX) |
| Burley | 88.5 FM | KBSY | 440 | 635 m (2,083 ft) | News/talk | FCC (KBSY) |
| Jackpot (Nevada) | 91.3 FM | KBSJ | 3,900 | 751 m (2,464 ft) | News/talk | FCC (KBSJ) |
| Lewiston | 89.9 FM | KLCZ | 230 | −256 m (−840 ft) | News/talk | FCC (KLCZ) |
| McCall | 90.7 FM | KBSQ | 220 | 602 m (1,975 ft) | News/talk | FCC (KBSQ) |
| McCall | 91.7 FM | KBSM | 220 | 583 m (1,913 ft) | Classical | FCC (KBSM) |
| McCall | 89.9 FM | KBSK | 450 | 602 m (1,975 ft) | Jazz | FCC (KBSK) |
| Sun Valley | 91.1 FM | KBSS | 700 | 570 m (1,870 ft) | News/talk | FCC (KBSS) |
| Sun Valley | 91.9 FM | KWRV | 100 | 656.6 m (2,154 ft) | Classical | FCC (KWRV) |
| Twin Falls | 91.7 FM (HD) | KBSW | 4,500 | 150 m (490 ft) | Classical, News/talk | FCC (KBSW) |

== History ==
The network's roots date back to 1957, when KBJC was launched by what was then Boise Junior College (BJC) as a carrier current station. It originally operated only when school was in session, and was a typical freeform college radio station. The station grew with the school, increasing its operating hours when BJC was upgraded to four-year status. The call letters changed to KBSC after Boise College was taken over by the state in 1967, and to KBSU after it was granted university status. In 1976, the station was granted a full FM license, and went on the air for the first time that fall. Gradually, the station began transitioning away from the freeform format, ultimately joining NPR in 1988. Before then, Boise was one of the largest cities in the western United States, and the only major market in Idaho, without a clear signal from NPR.

On October 18, 2022, Boise State Public Radio expanded to Lewiston and Pocatello. In Lewiston, Boise State Public Radio now operates KLCZ, formerly operated by Lewis–Clark State College, as a simulcast of KBSX; in Pocatello, it acquired the translator formerly operated by Salt Lake City NPR affiliate KUER-FM. Boise State Public Radio airs KBSU's musical programming in Pocatello, as the market receives NPR news programming from KISU-FM. In 2024, Boise State Public Radio acquired KWRV, a classical music station serving Sun Valley formerly operated by Minnesota Public Radio.

== See also ==
- KDBI (AM)
