= KPKY =

Radio station in Pocatello, Idaho

Coordinates: 42.874°N 112.514°W

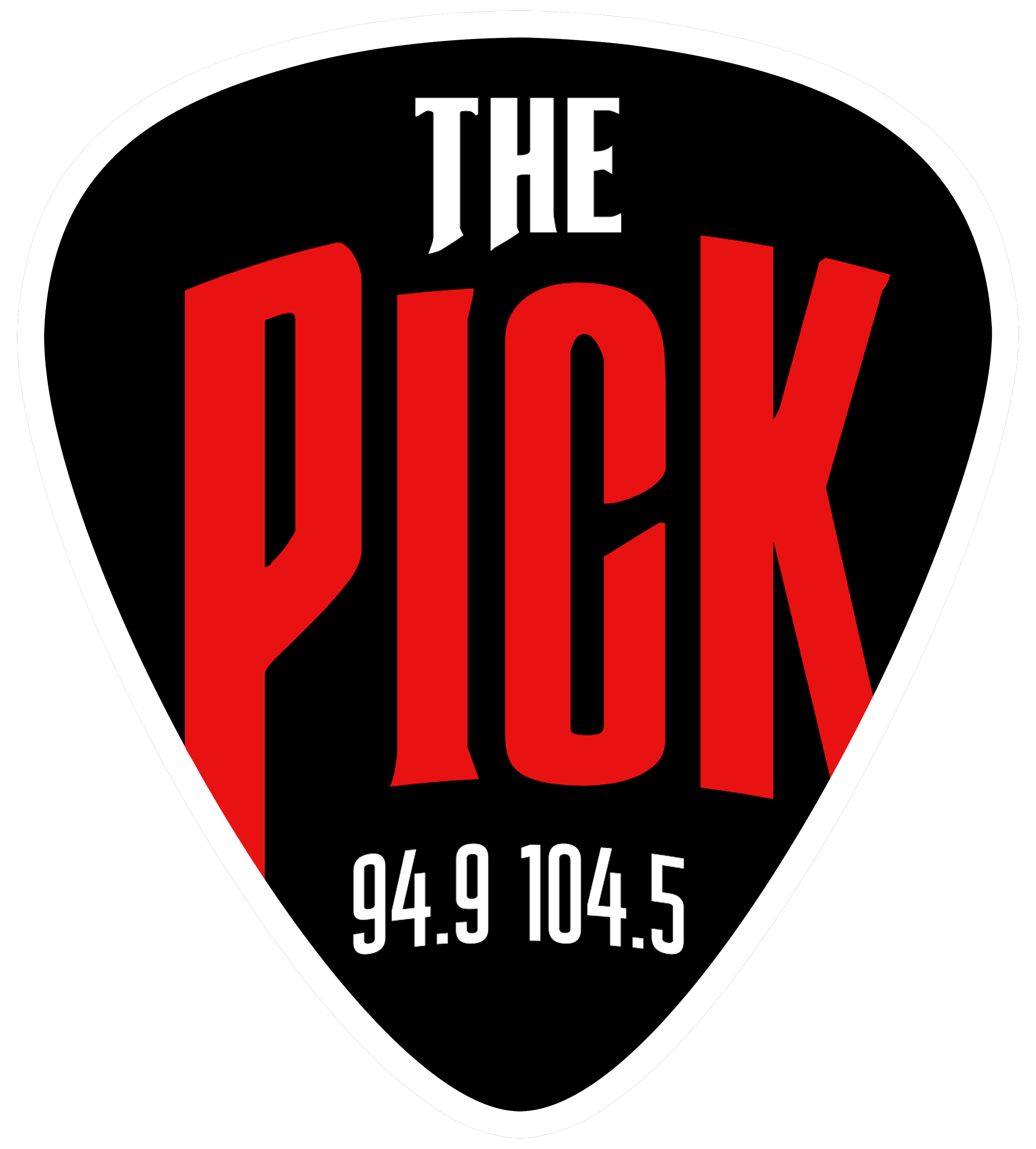
- Pocatello, Idaho; United States
- Broadcast area: Pocatello, Idaho; Idaho Falls, Idaho
- Frequency: 94.9 MHz
- Branding: 94.9 & 104.5 The Pick

Programming
- Format: Classic rock
- Affiliations: Compass Media Networks; United Stations Radio Networks; Utah Jazz Radio Network

Ownership
- Owner: Rich Broadcasting; (Rich Broadcasting Idaho LS, LLC)

History
- First air date: 1975 (as KSIH)
- Former call signs: KSIH (1975–1980)

Technical information
- Licensing authority: FCC
- Facility ID: 30246
- Class: C
- ERP: 100,000 watts
- HAAT: 306 meters (1,004 ft)
- Repeater: 104.5 KZKY (Ucon)

Links
- Public license information: Public file; LMS
- Webcast: Listen Live
- Website: pickidaho.com

KPKY (94.9 FM, "94.9 & 104.5 The Pick") is a commercial radio station located in Pocatello, Idaho. KPKY airs a classic rock music format.

== Ownership ==
In October 2007, a deal was reached for KPKY to be acquired by Gap Broadcasting II LLC (Samuel Weller, president) from Clear Channel Communications as part of a 57 station deal with a total reported sale price of $74.78 million. What eventually became GapWest Broadcasting was folded into Townsquare Media on August 13, 2010; Townsquare, in turn, sold its Idaho Falls–Pocatello stations to Rich Broadcasting in 2011.

== History ==
Through the later 1980s, KPKY was branded as “95 Alive” with a Top 40 format. By 1991, the station rebranded as “The New Y95” and then changed to “Oldies 94.9” by 1993. By the late 1990s, the station had rebranded as “Kool 94.9” with a Classic Hits format. In the earlier 2000s, the station became simply known as “94 Nine” with Classic Rock. In 2018 the station rebranded to 94.9 & 104.5 The Pick.
