= KQPI =

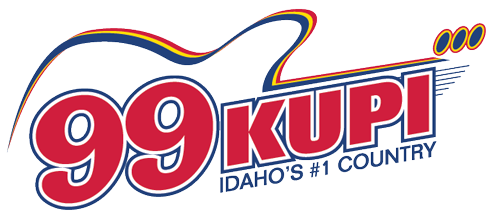
- Aberdeen, Idaho; United States
- Broadcast area: Pocatello, Idaho
- Frequency: 99.5 MHz (HD Radio)
- Branding: 99 KUPI

Programming
- Format: Country (KUPI-FM simulcast)

Ownership
- Owner: Sandhill Media Group, LLC

History
- First air date: 2008

Technical information
- Licensing authority: FCC
- Facility ID: 164125
- Class: C2
- ERP: 2,200 watts
- HAAT: 597 meters (1,959 ft)
- Transmitter coordinates: 42°48′31″N 112°29′10″W

Links
- Public license information: Public file; LMS
- Webcast: Listen Live
- Website: 99kupi.com

KQPI (99.5 FM) is a radio station broadcasting a country music format, simulcasting KUPI 99.1 FM Idaho Falls, Idaho. Licensed to Aberdeen, Idaho, USA, the station serves the Pocatello area. The station is currently owned by Sandhill Media Group, LLC.
