= KGTM =

Coordinates: 43.543°N 111.886°W

- Shelley, Idaho; United States
- Broadcast area: Idaho Falls, Idaho
- Frequency: 98.1 MHz
- Branding: Star 98

Programming
- Format: Classic hits (KLLP simulcast)

Ownership
- Owner: Rich Broadcasting

History
- First air date: 2000; 26 years ago (as KBJX)
- Former call signs: KBJX (1998–2012); KQEZ (2012–2015)

Technical information
- Licensing authority: FCC
- Facility ID: 73616
- Class: C1
- ERP: 100,000 watts
- HAAT: 194 meters

Links
- Public license information: Public file; LMS
- Webcast: Listen Live
- Website: star98radio.com

KGTM is a stunting formatted radio station located in Shelley, Idaho, broadcasting to the Eastern Idaho area on 98.1 FM.

== History ==
KGTM had been silent since being purchased by Rich Broadcasting in October 2011. In November 2011, the then-KBJX started broadcasting a Christmas music format under the branding "106.3 The Elf". On January 4, 2012, KBJX changed their format to adult contemporary, branded as "EZ Rock 106.3". On June 21, 2012, KBJX changed their call letters to KQEZ to match the "EZ Rock" branding. KQEZ swapped call signs with co-owned KGTM on March 23, 2015, and changed their format to a simulcast of hot AC-formatted KLLP 98.5 FM Chubbuck, Idaho.

On May 3, 2025, KGTM and KLLP began stunting with an hour-long, including commercial breaks, sound collage hinting at a relaunch of the "Star 98" brand under a classic hits format, including snippets of songs with the words "star" or "change" in the title or overall theme, as well as snippets of random vintage music and pop culture audio clips from between the 1970s and 2000s and several songs themed around either national or Idaho state patriotism, all punctuated with sweepers warning listeners that the relaunched format would launch the following Monday, May 5, at Noon. At that time KGTM and KLLP launched a classic hits format.
