= KDIL =

Simulcasts KRXR, Gooding
- Jerome, Idaho; United States
- Frequency: 940 kHz
- Branding: Radio Fiesta 101.3-1480 Y La K Padre 940

Programming
- Format: Spanish Adult Hits

Ownership
- Owner: Karlee Ortega

History
- First air date: 2010

Technical information
- Licensing authority: FCC
- Facility ID: 161412
- Class: B
- Power: 1,000 watts day 250 watts night
- Transmitter coordinates: 42°43′38″N 114°37′37″W
- Translators: 94.3 K232FO (Jerome); 101.3 K267AE (Jerome)

Links
- Public license information: Public file; LMS
- Website: Official Website

KDIL (940 AM) is a licensed radio station with an FCC-issued license for Jerome, Idaho, United States. The station began broadcasting in November 2010 under Program Test Authority from the FCC and was licensed on February 15, 2011. The station broadcasts a Spanish adult hits format distributed by Orbital Media Networks. The station is currently owned by Karlee Ortega.
