= KWAL =

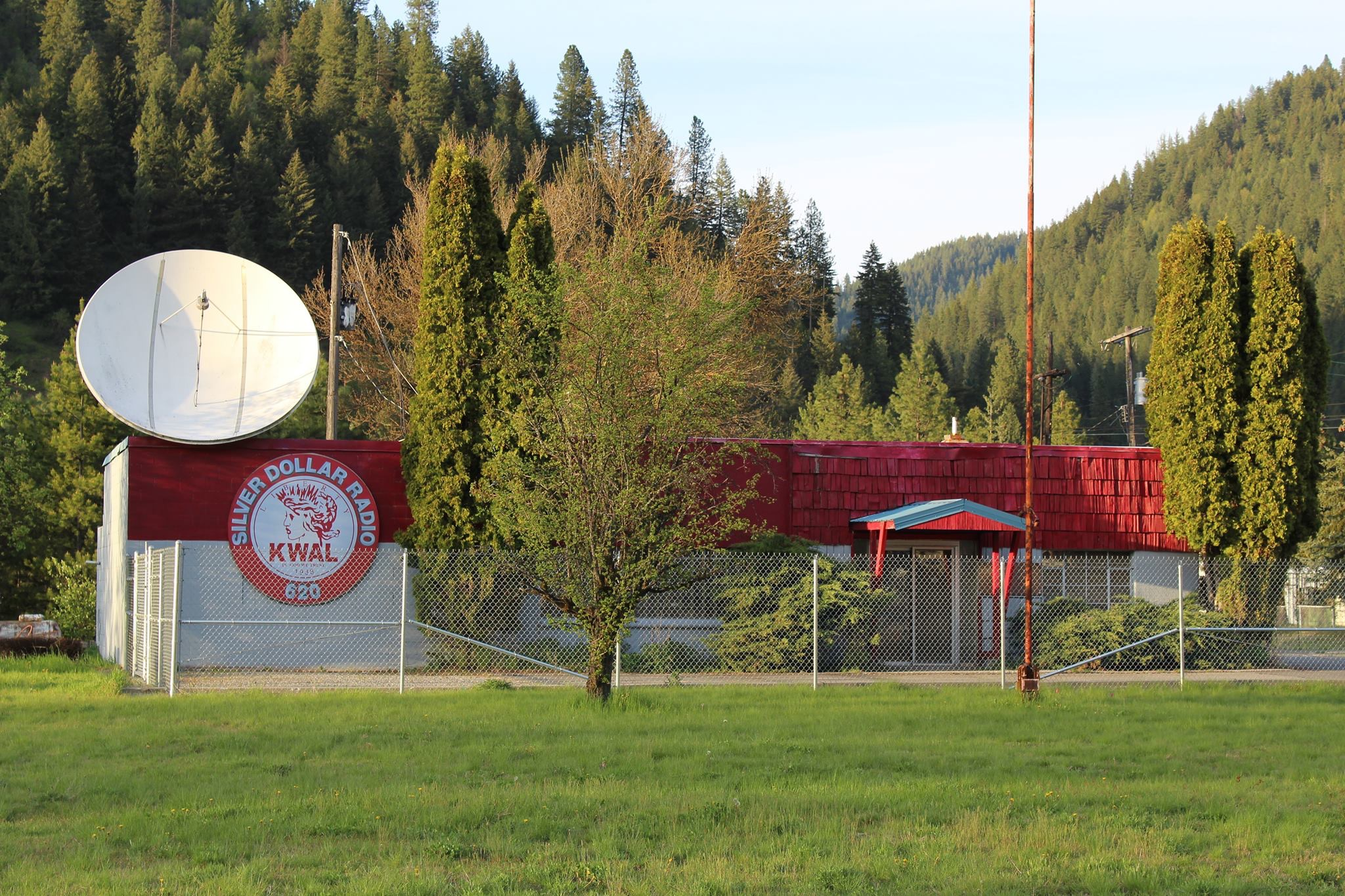
- Wallace, Idaho; United States
- Broadcast area: Silver Valley
- Frequency: 620 kHz

Programming
- Format: Defunct (was Country)
- Affiliations: Westwood One

Ownership
- Owner: Metals Broadcasting Co.

History
- First air date: May 1938; 88 years ago
- Last air date: August 31, 2018; 7 years ago

Technical information
- Facility ID: 41318
- Class: B
- Power: 1,000 watts day 250 watts night
- Transmitter coordinates: 47°30′32″N 116°0′05″W

KWAL (620 AM) was a radio station broadcasting a country format to the Wallace, Idaho, United States, area. The station was owned by Metals Broadcasting Co. and featured programming from Westwood One. KWAL was unique because it was the only AM antenna array that had an interstate highway running through it. The station broadcast in C-QUAM AM stereo.

On April 9, 2016, the north tower collapsed after a pickup truck struck a guy wire. The station was granted authority to operate at 250 watts during nighttime hours using the south tower only. The FCC granted them the opportunity giving them a two-year deadline to rebuild the tower. KWAL failed to rebuild the north tower; consequently, they were forced to shut down.

The station's license was surrendered to the FCC for cancellation on November 4, 2019, and eventually cancelled by the FCC on February 13, 2020.

== History ==
In 1938, KWAL entered the Silver Valley's airwaves. In 1948, KWAL's frequency changed from 1450 kHz to 620 kHz, and its power increased from 250 Watts to 1 kilowatt. At that time, the station was a Mutual affiliate, licensed to Silver Broadcasting Company.
