= KATW =

- Lewiston, Idaho; United States
- Frequency: 101.5 MHz
- Branding: 101.5 Cat FM

Programming
- Format: Hot adult contemporary
- Affiliations: Premiere Radio Networks, Westwood One

Ownership
- Owner: Pacific Empire Radio Corporation

History
- First air date: October 2, 1986

Technical information
- Licensing authority: FCC
- Facility ID: 73614
- Class: C1
- ERP: 100,000 watts
- HAAT: 258 meters
- Transmitter coordinates: 46°27′38″N 117°1′0″W

Links
- Public license information: Public file; LMS
- Website: KATW Online

KATW (101.5 FM, "101.5 Cat FM") is a radio station broadcasting a hot adult contemporary music format. Licensed to Lewiston, Idaho, United States, the station serves the Lewiston area. The station is currently owned by Pacific Empire Radio Corporation and features programming from Premiere Radio Networks and Westwood One.

== See also ==
- List of radio stations in Idaho
