= KKMV =

- Rupert, Idaho; United States
- Broadcast area: Magic Valley
- Frequency: 106.1 MHz
- Branding: Kat Kountry 106

Programming
- Format: Country
- Affiliations: Premiere Networks; Westwood One

Ownership
- Owner: Lee Family Broadcasting
- Sister stations: KART, KBAR, KEDJ, KKRK, KXTA-FM, KZDX

History
- First air date: July 30, 1979 (first license granted)
- Call sign meaning: Kat Kountry Magic Valley

Technical information
- Licensing authority: FCC
- Facility ID: 67744
- Class: C0
- ERP: 25,000 watts
- HAAT: 761 meters
- Transmitter coordinates: 42°20′6″N 113°36′15″W

Links
- Public license information: Public file; LMS
- Webcast: Listen Live
- Website: kat106.com

KKMV (106.1 FM) is a radio station broadcasting a country format. Licensed to Rupert, Idaho, United States, the station serves the Twin Falls (Sun Valley) area. The station is currently owned by Lee Family Broadcasting, Inc.

KKMV signed on July 30, 1979. KKMV was originally owned by KART Broadcasting Company, with sister KART. It was transferred to Lee Family Broadcasting in 2012 for $650,000.
