= KBSK =

Coordinates: 45.010°N 116.132°W

- McCall, Idaho; United States
- Frequency: 89.9 (MHz)
- Branding: Boise State Public Radio

Programming
- Format: Public radio; jazz
- Network: Boise State Public Radio

Ownership
- Owner: Boise State University

History
- First air date: 2002

Technical information
- Licensing authority: FCC
- Facility ID: 91742
- Class: C3
- ERP: 220 watts
- HAAT: 585 meters (1,919 ft)

Links
- Public license information: Public file; LMS
- Webcast: Listen live
- Website: www.boisestatepublicradio.org

KBSK (89.9 FM) is a radio station licensed to McCall, Idaho. The station is owned by Boise State University, and is affiliated with Boise State Public Radio. KBSK airs a jazz format.

The station's programming also airs on the HD Radio subchannels of KBSU in Boise, KBSS in Sun Valley and KBSW in Twin Falls.

== See also ==
- List of jazz radio stations in the United States
