= KBSU (FM) =

Public radio station in Boise, Idaho

Coordinates: 43.756°N 116.099°W

- Boise, Idaho; United States
- Broadcast area: Boise metropolitan area
- Frequency: 90.3 MHz (HD Radio)
- Branding: Boise State Public Radio

Programming
- Format: Classical music
- Subchannels: HD2: Simulcast of KBSK (jazz); HD3: Simulcast of KBSX (news/talk)
- Network: Boise State Public Radio

Ownership
- Owner: Boise State University
- Sister stations: KBSX

History
- First air date: 1977 (at 90.1; originally carrier current 1957-1976)
- Former call signs: KBSU (1976–1992); KBSU-FM (1992–2024)
- Former frequencies: 90.1 MHz (1977–1982); 91.3 MHz (1982–1988)
- Call sign meaning: Boise State University

Technical information
- Licensing authority: FCC
- Facility ID: 6325
- Class: C
- ERP: 17,500 watts
- HAAT: 827 meters (2,713 ft)
- Translator: (see article)

Links
- Public license information: Public file; LMS
- Webcast: Listen live
- Website: www.boisestatepublicradio.org

KBSU (90.3 FM) is a radio station licensed to Boise, Idaho. The station is owned by Boise State University, and is the flagship affiliate of Boise State Public Radio's "Music" network.

The station airs classical music and other entertainment programming from American Public Media and Public Radio Exchange.

KBSU broadcasts in HD.

== Translators ==
KBSU's programming is repeated on KBSM in McCall, Idaho. The station's signal is also relayed by the following translator stations.

Broadcast translators for KBSU
Call sign	Frequency	City of license	FID	ERP (W)	FCC info
K201JC	88.1 FM	Stanley, Idaho	6327	100 watts	LMS
K215BN	90.9 FM	Cascade, Idaho	6326	5 watts horizontal 10 watts vertical	LMS

== See also ==
- List of jazz radio stations in the United States
