= KOUW =

- Island Park, Idaho; United States
- Frequency: 102.9 MHz
- Branding: KID Newsradio

Programming
- Format: News/Talk
- Affiliations: Westwood One

Ownership
- Owner: Richard Mecham; (Magic Valley Media, LLC)

History
- First air date: 1998 (as KWYS-FM)
- Former call signs: KEZQ (9/1998-11/1998); KWYS-FM (1998–2012); KOUW (2012–2015); KCHQ (2015)

Technical information
- Licensing authority: FCC
- Facility ID: 83882
- Class: C
- ERP: 37,000 watts
- HAAT: 842 meters
- Transmitter coordinates: 44°33′41″N 111°26′32″W

Links
- Public license information: Public file; LMS
- Website: www.590kid.com

KOUW (102.9 FM) is a radio station broadcasting a talk format. The station is licensed to serve the community of Island Park, Idaho, United States. The station is currently owned by Richard Mecham, through licensee Magic Valley Media, LLC, and features programming from Westwood One.

== History ==
The station was assigned the callsign KEZQ on September 25, 1998. On November 30, 1998, the station changed its call sign to KWYS-FM, on February 24, 2012, to KOUW, on December 7, 2015, to KCHQ, and on December 23, 2015, back to KOUW.

== Station back on-air ==
Though off-air for quite a while with issues ranging from signal strength to ice storm issues and lightning, as of Summer 2009, the station is on-air, 24 hours a day and at full-strength.

The station's coverage area is, as their slogan goes, from "Big Sky to Blackfoot" and it is one of very few stations available through the entirety of Yellowstone National Park and the only station most car scanners will stick on.

On September 9, 2016, KOUW switched to a simulcast of news/talk-formatted KID 590 AM Idaho Falls.
