= KMCL (AM) =

Donnelly, Idaho; United States
- Frequency: 1240 kHz
- Branding: Mccool 1240

Programming
- Format: Defunct
- Affiliations: ABC Radio

Ownership
- Owner: Brundage Mountain Air Inc.

History
- Former call signs: KZID (1987–1992)

Technical information
- Facility ID: 7376
- Class: C
- Power: 1,000 watts unlimited
- Transmitter coordinates: 44°46′52″N 116°2′51″W

KMCL (1240 AM) was a radio station formerly broadcasting an Adult Contemporary format. Located in Donnelly, Idaho, United States, the station was owned by Brundage Mountain Air Inc.

== History ==
The station was assigned the call letters KZID on 1987-06-01. On 1992-02-10, the station changed its call sign to KMCL.

On October 9, 2009, the station turned in its license to the Federal Communications Commission. The license was cancelled and the call sign deleted from the FCC's database.
