= KCLK-FM =

- Clarkston, Washington; United States
- Broadcast area: Lewiston, Idaho
- Frequency: 94.1 MHz
- Branding: Hot Country 94.1

Programming
- Format: Country
- Affiliations: Westwood One

Ownership
- Owner: Pacific Empire Radio Corporation
- Sister stations: KCLK (AM), KVAB

History
- First air date: 1971
- Call sign meaning: K CLarKston

Technical information
- Licensing authority: FCC
- Facility ID: 11721
- Class: C0
- ERP: 100,000 watts
- HAAT: 376 meters (1,234 ft)
- Transmitter coordinates: 46°27′27″N 117°6′3″W

Links
- Public license information: Public file; LMS

KCLK-FM (94.1 FM, "Hot Country 94.1") is a radio station broadcasting a country music format, licensed to Clarkston, Washington, United States. As of January 2009, the station is owned by Pacific Empire Radio Corporation.

== History ==
On June 1, 2017, KCLK-FM changed their format from oldies (branded as "Cool 94.1") to country, branded as "Hot Country 94.1".
