= KLER (AM) =

- Orofino, Idaho; United States
- Frequency: 1300 kHz
- Branding: Us Country 13

Programming
- Format: Country music

Ownership
- Owner: Jeffery and Monica Jones; (Central Idaho Broadcasting, Inc.)
- Sister stations: KLER-FM

History
- First air date: 1958
- Call sign meaning: Station was originally owned by the Clearwater Broadcasting Company

Technical information
- Licensing authority: FCC
- Facility ID: 9886
- Class: B
- Power: 5,000 watts (day); 1,000 watts (night)
- Transmitter coordinates: 46°28′41″N 116°14′34″W

Links
- Public license information: Public file; LMS

KLER (1300 AM) is a radio station licensed to Orofino, Idaho, United States, broadcasting a country music format. The station is currently owned by Jeffery and Monica Jones, through licensee Central Idaho Broadcasting, Inc.

KLER broadcasts Major League Baseball as an affiliate of the Seattle Mariners radio network.

== History of call letters ==
The call letters KLER were previously assigned to a station in Rochester, Minnesota. It broadcast on 970 kHz with 500 W power (daytime). That station became an ABC affiliate October 1, 1948. The station was bought out by KROC and signed off May 31, 1952.
