= KUPI-FM =

Radio station in Rexburg–Idaho Falls, Idaho

Coordinates: 43.542°N 111.885°W

KUPI
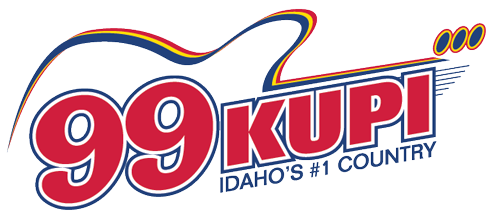
- Rexburg, Idaho; United States
- Broadcast area: Idaho Falls, Idaho
- Frequency: 99.1 MHz (HD Radio)
- Branding: 99 KUPI

Programming
- Format: Country
- Subchannels: HD2: Classic country "KUPI Legends"

Ownership
- Owner: Sand Hill Media

History
- First air date: 1975 (as KADQ at 94.3)
- Former call signs: KADQ (1975–1980); KADQ-FM (1980–2006); KSNA (2006–2011)
- Former frequencies: 94.3 MHz (1975–2011)

Technical information
- Licensing authority: FCC
- Facility ID: 64698
- Class: C1
- ERP: 100,000 watts
- HAAT: 176 meters
- Repeaters: 99.5 KQPI (Aberdeen); 99.9 KUPY (Sugar City)

Links
- Public license information: Public file; LMS
- Webcast: Listen Live
- Website: 99kupi.com

KUPI-FM (99.1 MHz) is a commercial radio station located in Idaho Falls, Idaho. KUPI-FM airs a country music format branded as "99 KUPI". It is also simulcast on KQPI at 99.5 MHz in Aberdeen, Idaho and on KUPY at 99.9 MHz in Sugar City, Idaho

== History ==
KADQ signed on in 1975 at 94.3 MHz. It was owned by Ted Austin until his 1977 death; his son sold the station three years later to Southwest Television Ltd., at the time owner of KZAZ-TV in Tucson, Arizona, for $240,000. However, Ted Austin Jr. later reacquired the station, owning it and an Idaho Falls construction permit until its sale to present owner Sand Hill Media in 2001 for $1.2 million.

KADQ became KSNA, a contemporary hit radio outlet known as Sunny 94.3, in 2006. In 2011, a large frequency shuffle involving dozens of stations swept the Mountain West. The 94.3 license was moved to 99.1 FM, and the existing 99.1 license was moved to 100.7. To keep the KUPI-FM country programming on 99.1, KSNA was relocated from one license at 94.3 to the other at 100.7, and the two stations also switched call signs.
