= KEZJ (AM) =

- Twin Falls, Idaho; United States
- Frequency: 1450 kHz
- Branding: Radio Catolica Sal y Luz

Programming
- Language: Spanish
- Format: Catholic radio

Ownership
- Owner: Salt & Light Radio, Inc.
- Sister stations: KTFI

History
- First air date: 1946

Technical information
- Licensing authority: FCC
- Facility ID: 3402
- Class: C
- Power: 1,000 watts unlimited
- Transmitter coordinates: 42°32′35.7″N 114°28′17.1″W
- Translator: 102.5 K273DG (Twin Falls)

Links
- Public license information: Public file; LMS
- Website: salyluzradio.com

KEZJ (1450 AM) is a radio station licensed to Twin Falls, Idaho, United States, the station serves the Twin Falls area. The station is owned by Salt & Light Radio, Inc.
