= KMGI (FM) =

Radio station in Pocatello, Idaho

Coordinates: 42.8657°N 112.5136°W

- Pocatello, Idaho; United States
- Broadcast area: Pocatello, Idaho Falls, Rexburg, Blackfoot, American Falls, Burley
- Frequency: 102.5 MHz
- Branding: Magik 102.5

Programming
- Format: Classic rock
- Affiliations: United Stations Radio Networks

Ownership
- Owner: Idaho Wireless Corporation

History
- First air date: 1978 (as KRBU-FM)
- Former call signs: KRBU-FM (1978–1984); KSEI-FM (1984–1993)

Technical information
- Licensing authority: FCC
- Facility ID: 51215
- Class: C
- ERP: 100,000 watts
- HAAT: 312 meters

Links
- Public license information: Public file; LMS
- Webcast: Listen live
- Website: magik1025.com

KMGI (102.5 MHz) is a commercial FM radio station located in Pocatello, Idaho. KMGI was the first classic rock station in Idaho, originally licensed on June 27, 1978.

In the late 1980s and very early 1990s, the station had an Adult Contemporary format branded “Magic 102” with the KSEI-FM call letters. By 1992, the format had become Classic Rock, still using the “Magic” identity. In 1993, the call letters were changed to KMGI, leading to the discontinuation of the “Magic” branding.

KMGI was acquired in 2014 by Idaho Wireless Corporation, and on November 16, 2014, KMGI returned to its true heritage as a classic rock station as "The Rock of Idaho, Magik 102.5". The studios were moved to the Pocatello Radio Group complex and the previous combination rock format that included grunge and alternative was changed to focus on the superstars of classic rock under the guidance of 30-year veteran radio programmer Paul Anderson.

KMGI's announcers are all classic rock veterans, including Alice Cooper weekday nights. Weekday mornings are hosted by JD and Bridget.

KMGI broadcasts with 100 kW, and is a Class C FM station. KMGI's regional coverage area includes Pocatello, Idaho Falls, Rexburg, Blackfoot, American Falls, Burley and more.

== See also ==
- List of radio stations in Idaho
