= KZYR =

Radio station in Avon, Colorado

- Avon, Colorado; United States
- Broadcast area: Eagle County, Colorado
- Frequency: 97.7 MHz (HD Radio)
- Branding: The Zephyr

Programming
- Format: Modern rock
- Subchannels: HD2: Spanish CHR (102.1 El Puente)

Ownership
- Owner: Steve Leigh; (KNS Broadcasting, LLC)

History
- First air date: 1984
- Call sign meaning: "Zephyr"

Technical information
- Licensing authority: FCC
- Facility ID: 57335
- Class: C2
- ERP: 15,000 watts
- HAAT: 134.0 meters (439.6 ft)
- Transmitter coordinates: 39°38′5″N 106°26′47″W
- Translator: HD2: 102.1 K272AF (Eagle)

Links
- Public license information: Public file; LMS
- Webcast: Listen live
- Website: kzyr.com

KZYR (97.7 FM, "The Zephyr") is a radio station broadcasting a modern rock radio format. Licensed to Avon, Colorado, United States, the station is currently owned by Steve Leigh, through licensee KNS Broadcasting, LLC.

== History ==
KZYR signed on at 103.1 MHz in 1984 as "Brave New World". It was the fourth radio station in the Eagle Valley, with studios in the Benchmark Building in Avon. The station was programmed with an early form of adult album alternative known as "adult album rock". The "Dead Air" feature once drew an interesting letter from Jerry Garcia of the Grateful Dead on letterhead of his appreciation for the recognition. Several changes of ownership occurred in the late 1980s and early 1990s, with Jerrell K. Davis consolidating control in 1991; Gardiner Broadcast Partners bought the station not long after and became Rocky Mountain Radio in 1994. During this time, the station shifted to modern rock as "The Mountain". In the winter of 2001, the station's new owners—Cool Radio, LLC—moved the station from 103.1 FM to its new home at 97.7 and relaunched it as The Zephyr.

In 2017, Cool Radio sold KZYR and KKVM 104.7 in Vail to Rocky Mountain Radio Group, LLC, for $1 million. In 2021, KZYR Morning Host Steve Leigh bought the station under the corporate name, KNS Broadcasting. Leigh has been the morning show host on KZYR since 1992.
