= KART (AM) =

- Jerome, Idaho; United States
- Broadcast area: Twin Falls, Idaho
- Frequency: 1400 kHz
- Branding: 94.7 Buck FM

Programming
- Format: Classic Country
- Affiliations: ABC News Radio

Ownership
- Owner: Lee Family Broadcasting
- Sister stations: KBAR, KEDJ, KKMV, KKRK, KXTA-FM, KZDX

History
- First air date: 1956

Technical information
- Licensing authority: FCC
- Facility ID: 33445
- Class: C
- Power: 1,000 watts unlimited
- Transmitter coordinates: 42°43′51.1″N 114°32′21.3″W
- Translator: 94.7 K234CT (Twin Falls)

Links
- Public license information: Public file; LMS
- Webcast: Listen Live
- Website: 947buckfm.com

KART (1400 kHz) is an AM radio station broadcasting a classic country format. Licensed to Jerome, Idaho, United States, the station serves the Twin Falls area. The station is currently owned by Lee Family Broadcasting and is also heard on translator K234CT, licensed to Twin Falls on 94.7 FM.

Previous logo

KART came on air in 1956. It was a daytimer, signing on at 6 AM, and signing off at 7 pm. It was initially owned by Northside Broadcasters. The transmitter was .8 miles (1.3 km) north of Jerome. It was sold in 1958 to K. and Marion Clark. It was sold to Allen D. Lee for $25,000 in 1965.

The Lee family at one point owned sister stations KEDJ in Jerome, Idaho, and KTHK, in Idaho Falls. The station changed hands in May 2012, as it was sold to Lee Family Broadcasting for $650,000.

KART has been through a number of formats over the years, and was once carrying sports, known as 1400 The Game. In August 2016, the station and its translator flipped to country, and became known as 94-7 Buck-FM.

The station's translator received its license to cover on June 6, 2016.
