= KSRA (AM) =

- Salmon, Idaho; United States
- Frequency: 960 kHz
- Branding: Salmon River Classics

Programming
- Format: Adult contemporary
- Affiliations: Cumulus Media Networks

Ownership
- Owner: Emily and Robert Goodrich; (Bitterroot Communications, Inc.)
- Sister stations: KSRA-FM

History
- First air date: 1959
- Call sign meaning: Sawtooth Recreation Area

Technical information
- Licensing authority: FCC
- Facility ID: 71527
- Class: D
- Power: 1,000 watts (day); 56 watts (night)
- Transmitter coordinates: 45°11′2″N 113°52′12″W
- Translator: 94.3 K232CL (Challis)

Links
- Public license information: Public file; LMS
- Webcast: Listen live
- Website: ksraradio.net

KSRA (960 AM) is a radio station broadcasting an adult contemporary music format. Licensed to Salmon, Idaho, United States, the station is currently owned by Emily and Robert Goodrich through licensee Bitterroot Communications, Inc. It features programming from Cumulus Media Networks.

Studios for KSRA AM-FM are located at 315 Riverfront in Salmon. Both transmitters are at the joint transmitter site, northeast of town, off North St. Charles Road.

KSRA is an affiliate of the Boise State Broncos Network. For much of its existence, the station carried a country music format. Under ownership by Bitterroot Communications, the station carried a classic hits format.

KSRA's format has been described as "eclectic" in years past.

== History ==
KSRA signed on in 1959 and was owned by David and Elizabeth Ainsworth, operating as Salmon River Radio & Television Company. The transmitter was located north of the city and was licensed for 1,000 watts. They sold the station in 1969. James and Cindy Hone purchased the station in 2000 from Wescomm, Inc. The station's FM sister station, KSRA-FM, signed on in 1979. The Hones' Salmon River Communications sold both stations to Bitterroot Communications, Inc. effective January 4, 2019, for $350,000.

The stations were sold again in 2024 to Sharon and Jim Infanger for $100.
