= KEDJ =

Coordinates: 42.732°N 114.419°W

- Jerome, Idaho; United States
- Broadcast area: Twin Falls, Idaho
- Frequency: 103.1 MHz
- Branding: 103.1 The Edge

Programming
- Format: Active rock

Ownership
- Owner: Lee Family Broadcasting
- Sister stations: KART, KBAR, KKMV, KKRK, KXTA-FM, KZDX

History
- First air date: August 1970 (as KFMA at 92.7)
- Former call signs: KFMA (1970–1991); KZRT (1991–1993); KMVX (1993–2012); KZNO (2012–2014)
- Former frequencies: 92.7 MHz (1970–1979); 102.9 MHz (1979–2014)
- Call sign meaning: EDJ - "Edge"

Technical information
- Licensing authority: FCC
- Facility ID: 33446
- Class: C1
- ERP: 100,000 watts
- HAAT: 232 meters (761 ft)

Links
- Public license information: Public file; LMS
- Webcast: Listen live
- Website: 1031thedge.com

KEDJ (103.1 FM, "The Edge") is a commercial radio station located in Jerome, Idaho, broadcasting to the Twin Falls, Idaho, area. KEDJ airs an active rock format.

== History ==
The station first signed on the air in August 1970 using the call sign KFMA. Originally, it broadcast on 92.7 MHz. In 1979, the station underwent a technical move to 102.9 MHz, a frequency it would be on until 2014. In 1991, the call letters changed from KFMA to KZRT (Z103). By late 1993, the station shifted to a Hot Adult Contemporary format as KMVX ("Mix 103"). In 2012, after nearly two decades of "Mix," the station flipped to a sports talk format as KZNO ("102.9 The Zone"). In 2014, the station moved to 103.1. With the frequency change, the format also went from sports to the current active rock and new branding.
