= KSRA-FM =

- Salmon, Idaho; United States
- Frequency: 92.7 MHz
- Branding: The Heart of Idaho

Programming
- Format: Country and adult contemporary
- Affiliations: Cumulus Media Networks

Ownership
- Owner: Emily and Robert Goodrich; (Bitterroot Communications, Inc.)
- Sister stations: KSRA

History
- First air date: 1979
- Call sign meaning: Sawtooth Recreation Area

Technical information
- Licensing authority: FCC
- Facility ID: 71526
- Class: A
- ERP: 1,500 watts
- HAAT: −268 meters (−879 ft)
- Transmitter coordinates: 45°11′2″N 113°52′12″W

Links
- Public license information: Public file; LMS
- Website: ksraradio.net

KSRA-FM (92.7 FM) is a radio station broadcasting a country music/adult music hybrid format. Licensed to Salmon, Idaho, United States. The station is currently owned by Emily and Robert Goodrich, through licensee Bitterroot Communications, Inc. It features programming from Cumulus Media Networks.

Studios for KSRA AM-FM are located at 315 Riverfront in Salmon. Both transmitters are at the joint transmitter site, northeast of town, off North St. Charles Road. KSRA's format has been described as "eclectic" in years past.

KSRA-FM broadcasts local high school sports.

== History ==
Beginning as a construction permit in 1978, KSRA-FM, signed on in 1979.

The station's AM sister station, KSRA signed on in 1959 and was owned by David and Elizabeth Ainsworth. They sold the station in 1969. James and Cindy Hone, Salmon River Communications, purchased the station in 2000 from Wescomm, Inc. In 2005, KSRA was fined $13,000 for failing to renew its license on time, something that wasn't discovered until 2010. The station was also cited for operating after the license was expired.

Salmon River Communications sold both stations to Bitterroot Communications, Inc. effective January 4, 2019 for $350,000. The stations were sold again in 2024 to Sharon and Jim Infanger for $100.
