= KOZE-FM =

- Lewiston, Idaho; United States
- Broadcast area: Lewiston, Idaho
- Frequency: 96.5 MHz
- Branding: Z-Rock 96.5

Programming
- Format: Album oriented rock
- Affiliations: ABC Radio

Ownership
- Owner: Lee McVey and Angie McVey; (McVey Entertainment Group, LLC)
- Sister stations: KOZE

History
- First air date: January 17, 1961

Technical information
- Licensing authority: FCC
- Facility ID: 137
- Class: C1
- ERP: 25,000 watts
- HAAT: 226 meters (741 ft)
- Transmitter coordinates: 46°27′48″N 117°0′1″W

Links
- Public license information: Public file; LMS
- Webcast: Listen Live
- Website: koze.com

KOZE-FM (96.5 FM) is a radio station broadcasting an album oriented rock format. Licensed to Lewiston, Idaho, United States, the station serves the Lewiston area. The station is currently owned by Lee and Angie McVey's McVey Entertainment Group, LLC, and features programming from ABC Radio.
