= KOZE (AM) =

- Lewiston, Idaho; United States
- Broadcast area: Lewiston–Clarkston metropolitan area
- Frequency: 950 kHz
- Branding: Talk Radio 950 KOZE

Programming
- Format: Talk radio
- Affiliations: ABC News Radio; NBC News Radio; Premiere Networks; Salem Radio Network; Westwood One

Ownership
- Owner: Lee McVey and Angie McVey; (McVey Entertainment Group, LLC)
- Sister stations: KOZE-FM

History
- First air date: October 5, 1953
- Former call signs: KLER (1953–1957)

Technical information
- Licensing authority: FCC
- Facility ID: 140
- Class: B
- Power: 5,000 watts day 1,000 watts night
- Transmitter coordinates: 46°23′32″N 117°2′3″W
- Translator: 95.5 K238CI (Lewiston)

Links
- Public license information: Public file; LMS
- Webcast: Listen Live
- Website: koze.com

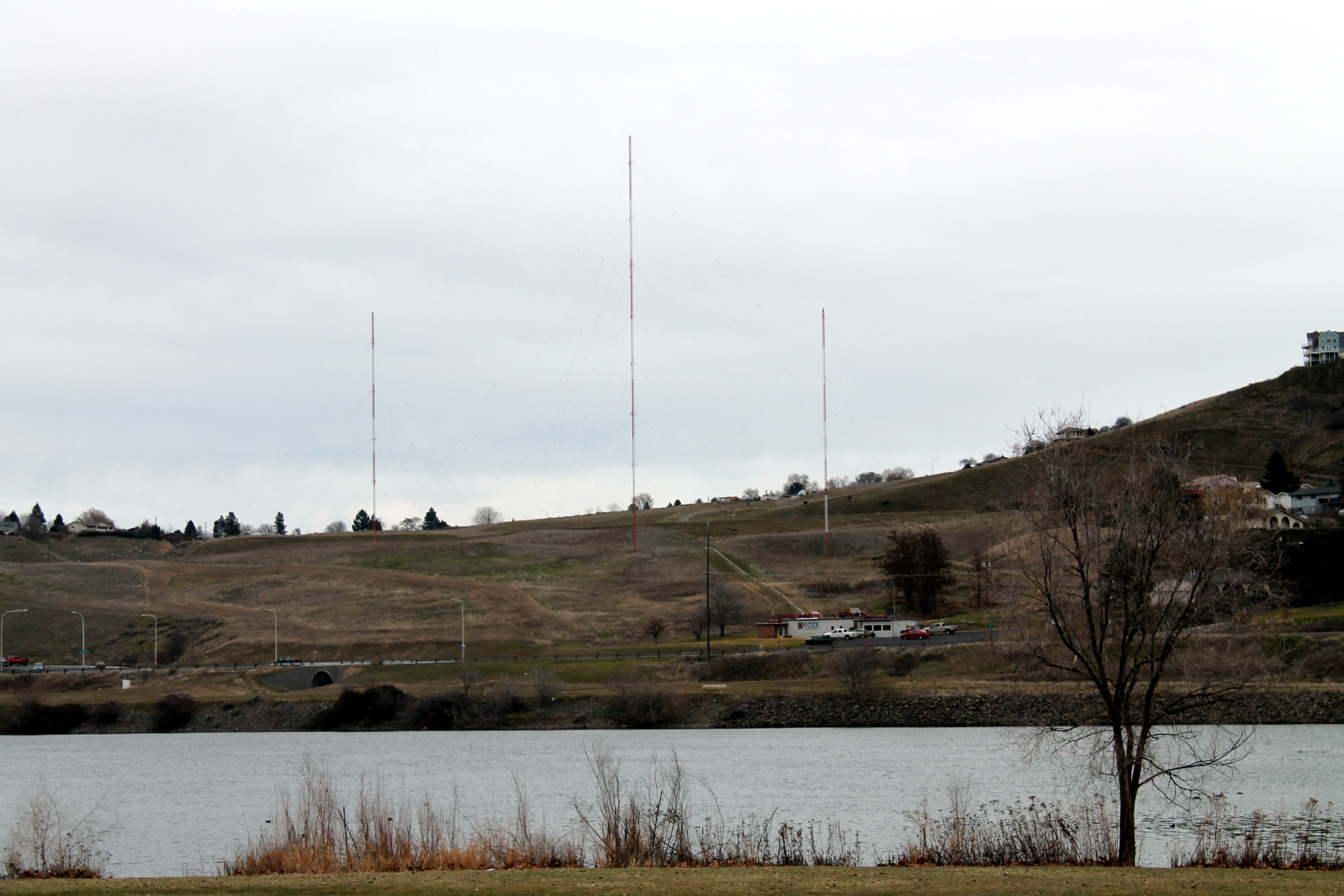
The radio towers and studio for KOZE AM 950, Lewiston, Idaho, as seen from across the river in Clarkston, Washington.

KOZE (950 kHz) is a commercial AM radio station broadcasting a talk radio format. Licensed to Lewiston, Idaho, United States, the station is currently owned by Lee and Angie McVey's McVey Entertainment Group, LLC.

By day, KOZE is powered at 5,000 watts. But at night, to reduce interference to other stations on 950 AM, KOZE reduces power to 1,000 watts. It uses a directional antenna with a three-tower array.

== Programming ==
Most of KOZE's weekday programming is from nationally syndicated conservative talk shows. They include Doug Stephan, Glenn Beck, Dennis Prager, Michael Medved, Dave Ramsey, Jim Bohannon and "Coast to Coast AM with George Noory."

Weekends feature shows on money, health, pets, guns, cars, technology and real estate. Weekend hosts include Kim Komando, Dr. Ronald Hoffman, Ron Aninian, Warren Eckstein and "Somewhere in Time with Art Bell." Most hours begin with an update from ABC News Radio.

== History ==
On October 5, 1953, the station signed on the air. The original call sign was KLER. Four years later, it switched to the current KOZE call letters. In 1961, an FM station was added, 96.5 KOZE-FM.

During the 1960s and 70s, KOZE was a popular Top 40 radio station. It had been affiliated with the ABC Contemporary Radio Network.

Former logo
