= KORR =

Radio station in American Falls–Pocatello, Idaho

- American Falls, Idaho; United States
- Broadcast area: American Falls - Pocatello - Blackfoot - Idaho Falls
- Frequency: 104.1 MHz (HD Radio)
- Branding: KORR 104

Programming
- Format: Adult Top-40
- Subchannels: HD2: Oldies; HD3: KSEI simulcast HD4: KOUU simulcast

Ownership
- Owner: Idaho Wireless Corporation

History
- Former call signs: KOUU (1991–1995)

Technical information
- Licensing authority: FCC
- Facility ID: 28256
- Class: C1
- ERP: 56,000 watts
- HAAT: 338 meters
- Transmitter coordinates: 42°51′46″N 112°31′3″W
- Translator: 103.7 K279CH (Pocatello)

Links
- Public license information: Public file; LMS
- Webcast: Listen live
- Website: korr104.com

KORR (104.1 FM) is a radio station broadcasting an Adult Top-40 format. Licensed to American Falls, Idaho, United States, the station serves the Pocatello area. The station is currently owned by Idaho Wireless Corporation.

== History ==
The station was assigned the call letters KOUU on November 29, 1991. On February 17, 1995, the station changed to the current KORR.
