= KCLK (AM) =

- Asotin, Washington; United States
- Broadcast area: Lewiston, Idaho; Clarkston, Washington; Moscow, Idaho; Pullman, Washington
- Frequency: 1430 kHz
- Branding: AM 1430 The Sports Fan

Programming
- Format: Sports
- Affiliations: Fox Sports Radio; Motor Racing Network

Ownership
- Owner: Salt & Light Radio, Inc.
- Sister stations: KCLK-FM, KVAB

History
- First air date: 1971
- Call sign meaning: K CLarKston

Technical information
- Licensing authority: FCC
- Facility ID: 11722
- Class: B
- Power: 5,000 watts (day); 1,000 watts (night)
- Transmitter coordinates: 46°18′58.6″N 117°2′27.6″W
- Translator: 107.3 K297BZ (Asotin)

Links
- Public license information: Public file; LMS

KCLK (1430 AM) is a radio station broadcasting a sports format, exclusively with Fox Sports Radio programming. Located near Asotin, Washington, United States, the station serves Lewiston, Clarkston, Asotin, Pullman, Moscow and surrounding areas. KCLK is currently owned by Salt & Light Radio, Inc.
