= KBYR-FM =

Christian radio station at BYU-Idaho in Rexburg, Idaho

- Rexburg, Idaho; United States
- Broadcast area: Southeastern Idaho
- Frequency: 91.5 MHz
- Branding: BYU-Idaho Radio

Programming
- Format: Religious

Ownership
- Owner: Brigham Young University-Idaho
- Sister stations: KBYI

History
- First air date: 1993
- Former call signs: KWBH (1993–2001); KPRI (March–October 2001)

Technical information
- Licensing authority: FCC
- Class: A
- ERP: 1,000 watts
- HAAT: 14 meters
- Transmitter coordinates: 43°49′02″N 111°46′45″W
- Repeater: 89.9 KBYA (Afton, Wyoming)

Links
- Public license information: Public file; LMS
- Website: www.byui.edu/radio/

KBYR-FM 91.5 is a radio station in Rexburg, Idaho, United States. It is one of two program services operated by BYU-Idaho Radio, the radio division of Brigham Young University-Idaho, and offers inspirational and religious programs.

It launched as KWBH in 1993, and served as the continuation of the non-broadcast student radio station on the campus of what was then Ricks College, KVIK, which was a carrier current outlet and had existed since 1959. It also aired programs from the Bonneville International LDS Radio Network. As with its sister station, KRIC, it broadcast from Spori Hall until it was gutted in a 2000 fire. The call sign changed in 2001, the same year that Ricks College became BYU–Idaho.
