= KXQZ (AM) =

- Wendell, Idaho; United States
- Frequency: 1340 kHz
- Branding: Salt & Light

Programming
- Format: Catholic radio
- Affiliations: EWTN

Ownership
- Owner: Maria Ortega Heredia

History
- Former call signs: KXSL (2010–2011); KTFI (2011–2015)

Technical information
- Licensing authority: FCC
- Facility ID: 160750
- Class: C
- Power: 1,000 watts (unlimited)
- Transmitter coordinates: 42°43′26″N 114°40′11″W
- Translators: K262DD (100.3 MHz, Twin Falls)

Links
- Public license information: Public file; LMS
- Webcast: Listen live
- Website: www.saltandlightradio.com

KXQZ (1340 AM, "Salt & Light") is a radio station licensed to serve the community of Wendell, Idaho. The station is owned by Maria Ortega Heredia, and airs a Catholic radio format.

The station was assigned the call sign KXSL by the Federal Communications Commission on December 10, 2010. The station changed its call sign to KTFI on February 3, 2011, and to KXQZ on January 27, 2015.
