= KWFO-FM =

Simulcasts KWFI-FM, Aberdeen
- Driggs, Idaho; United States
- Broadcast area: Eastern Idaho and western Wyoming
- Frequency: 102.1 MHz
- Branding: 96.1 & 102.1 The Wolf

Programming
- Format: Country

Ownership
- Owner: Rich Broadcasting Idaho LS, LLC

History
- First air date: 2003
- Former call signs: KCHQ (2002–2015); KIDJ (2015); KCHQ (2015–2018)

Technical information
- Licensing authority: FCC
- Facility ID: 87925
- Class: C1
- ERP: 16,000 watts
- HAAT: 523 meters (1,716 ft)
- Transmitter coordinates: 43°43′54″N 111°21′52″W
- Translator: See § Translators and booster

Links
- Public license information: Public file; LMS
- Webcast: Listen live
- Website: wolfidaho.com

KWFO-FM (102.1 FM) is a radio station broadcasting a country music format, simulcasting KWFI-FM 96.1 from Idaho Falls, Idaho. Licensed to Driggs, Idaho, United States, KWFO-FM is owned by Rich Broadcasting Idaho LS, LLC.

KWFO uses a signal booster (KWFO-FM1) atop Snow King Mountain in Jackson, Wyoming, to provide signal there.

Four other translators also supplement coverage along the east side of the Teton Range. Additionally, the station serves as a regional home for sports broadcasting, including Boise State Broncos athletics, which provides game coverage for fans on both the Idaho and Wyoming sides of the Teton Range.

== History ==
The station first began broadcasting in 2003. It spent most of its early history under the call sign KCHQ, which was synonymous with the regional "River Country" brand. On October 25, 2018, the station dropped its "River Country" branding in favor of "The Wolf," a move designed to align the station with a more modern, high-energy country format. To match the new branding, the call letters were officially changed from KCHQ to KWFO-FM on November 26, 2018.

== Translators and booster ==
Call sign	Frequency	City of license	FID	ERP (W)	HAAT	Class	FCC info
K257FT	99.3 FM	Teton Village, Wyoming	145826	100	182 m (597 ft)	D	LMS
K275BN	102.9 FM	Jackson, Wyoming	150599	10	307 m (1,007 ft)	D	LMS
K284BI	104.7 FM	Alpine, Wyoming	146573	10	698 m (2,290 ft)	D	LMS
KWFO-FM1	102.1 FM	Jackson, Wyoming	161675	100	297 m (974 ft)	D	LMS
