= KLER-FM =

- Orofino, Idaho; United States
- Frequency: 103.3 MHz
- Branding: Continuous Hits 103.3

Programming
- Format: Adult contemporary

Ownership
- Owner: Jeffery and Monica Jones; (Central Idaho Broadcasting, Inc.)

History
- First air date: September 20, 1979
- Former frequencies: 95.1 MHz (1979–2021)

Technical information
- Licensing authority: FCC
- Facility ID: 9890
- Class: C3
- ERP: 2,300 watts
- HAAT: 206 meters (676 ft)
- Transmitter coordinates: 46°28′9″N 116°16′40″W

Links
- Public license information: Public file; LMS

KLER-FM (103.3 FM) is a radio station in the western United States, broadcasting an adult contemporary format in Orofino, Idaho. It is currently owned by Jeffery and Monica Jones, through licensee Central Idaho Broadcasting, Inc.

On January 27, 2021, KLER-FM moved from 95.1 MHz to 103.3 MHz due to interference with KPND 95.3 in the Spokane area.
