= KECH-FM =

Radio station in Sun Valley–Twin Falls, Idaho

- Sun Valley, Idaho; United States
- Broadcast area: Twin Falls (Sun Valley) area
- Frequency: 95.3 MHz
- Branding: KECH 95.3 FM

Programming
- Format: Classic rock
- Affiliations: Westwood One

Ownership
- Owner: Richard Mecham; (Woods River Media, LLC)

History
- First air date: November 21, 1988
- Former call signs: KWRU (1988, CP)
- Call sign meaning: Ketchum

Technical information
- Licensing authority: FCC
- Facility ID: 1163
- Class: C1
- ERP: 2,500 watts
- HAAT: 583 meters (1,913 ft)
- Transmitter coordinates: 43°38′37″N 114°23′53″W

Links
- Public license information: Public file; LMS
- Webcast: Listen live
- Website: kech95fm.com

KECH-FM (95.3 FM) is a radio station broadcasting a classic rock format. Licensed to Sun Valley, Idaho, United States, the station serves the Twin Falls (Sun Valley) area. The station is currently owned by Richard Mecham, through licensee Woods River Media, LLC.

== History ==
The station was originally assigned the KWRU call sign by the FCC on February 16, 1988; it was to be a not-for-profit community radio station. When funding for the venture failed, it was acquired by Ketchum Radio, which built it out as commercial station KECH-FM and signed it on November 21, 1988. Ketchum Radio was a partnership headed by local resident Chris Haugh, and staff members including Larry Mott, Michael Hess (aka Dallas Dobro), and others, with Gary Stivers handling the news duties. Disc jockeys included Rob Hunter, Sadie Word, and other local talent. The call letters were chosen as a result of a contest, where listeners were asked to pick the call sign for the station. One listener chose KECH (short for the neighboring town of Ketchum). The listener won an all-expenses-paid trip to Belize.

In 1994, Ketchum Radio sold the station to another local operator, Scott Parker's Alpine Broadcasting, Ltd., who owned/operated the station for ten years as its flagship station. Alpine, also based in Ketchum went on to grow to a 15 station group in other resort markets, including Jackson Hole Wyoming, Sun Valley, Island Park and Idaho Falls Idaho, Taos and Angel Fire New Mexico, Big Sky, Whitefish & West Yellowstone Montana and Kailua-Kona & Hilo Hawaii. Alpine sold most of its stations to Chaparral Broadcasting, Inc. In 2020, Parker also built 1440 AM - KHLY in Hailey ID and 103.7 FM - KSUN in Sun Valley — moving that station across state from Bannock County to Blaine County, Idaho (formerly KPTO).

Chaparral sold KECH-FM and seven other stations to Rich Broadcasting for $3.7 million; the transaction was consummated on April 1, 2013.

Rich Broadcasting sold KECH-FM, three other stations, and a translator to Richard Mecham's Magic Valley Media, LLC effective September 17, 2019 for $475,000.

"KECH-95", (as it is known locally) continues to be the leading station in the Wood River Valley (Blaine County, ID) with local personalities and its service to community affairs.
