= KKRK =

- Rupert, Idaho; United States
- Broadcast area: Twin Falls, Idaho
- Frequency: 970 kHz
- Branding: Balanced Rock 100.5

Programming
- Format: Classic rock/hits

Ownership
- Owner: Lee Family Broadcasting
- Sister stations: KZDX, KART, KKMV, KEDJ, KBAR

History
- First air date: October 24, 1955
- Former call signs: KAYT (1955–1985); KBBK (1985–2000); KFTA (2000–2014); KZNO (2014–2015); KXTA (2015–2020)
- Call sign meaning: K K RocK

Technical information
- Licensing authority: FCC
- Facility ID: 67743
- Class: D
- Power: 1,000 watts day only
- Transmitter coordinates: 42°36′8″N 113°43′24″W
- Translator: 100.5 K263BX (Rupert)

Links
- Public license information: Public file; LMS
- Webcast: Listen live
- Website: www.balancedrockradio.com

KKRK (970 AM) is a radio station broadcasting a classic rock/hits format. Licensed to Rupert, Idaho, United States, the station serves the Twin Falls area. The station is currently owned by Lee Family Broadcasting.

== History ==
The station was assigned the call letters KAYT on 1955-10-24. They changed to KBBK on 1985-01-01, and on 2000-02-24, the station changed its call sign to KFTA.

The station began its regional Mexican format on November 1, 1999, as "La Fantástica 970", under the direction of Benjamin Reed, a.k.a. "El Chupacabras." Reed is Anglo by birth, but is fluent in Spanish. Reed has also been featured in Pulitzer Prize-winning author Hector Tobar's book, Translation Nation.

On March 1, 2013, the station began broadcasting the Spanish adult hits format "Juan" from Westwood One.

On August 4, 2014, KFTA changed their format to sports, branded as "The Zone", under new call letters, KZNO. The KZNO calls and "Zone" sports format were previously on 103.1 FM KEDJ, which switched to active rock as "The Edge".

On April 13, 2015, the station changed its call sign to KXTA. Its Regional Mexican oldies format returned to the air on June 6, 2015, at 7 PM. The station was again programmed by Benjamin Reed, "El Chupacabras".

On August 17, 2020, KXTA changed their format from regional Mexican to classic rock/hits, branded as "Balanced Rock 97.5/100.5". The call letters changed to KKRK on August 28, 2020.

== Previous use of the KXTA call sign ==
From 1997 to 2005, the KXTA call letters resided on 1150 kHz in Los Angeles, California, which at that time carried a sports talk format, branded as “Xtra Sports.” That station is now known as KEIB and carries a talk radio format branded as "The Patriot AM 1150".
