= KTFI (AM) =

Radio station in Twin Falls, Idaho

- Twin Falls, Idaho; United States
- Broadcast area: Twin Falls metropolitan area
- Frequency: 1270 kHz
- Branding: Salt & Light Catholic Radio

Programming
- Format: Catholic
- Affiliations: EWTN

Ownership
- Owner: Salt & Light Radio, Inc.

History
- First air date: November 11, 1928
- Former call signs: KGIQ (1928–1930); KTFI (1930–1977); KTLC (1977–1984); KTFI (1984–2010); KPDA (2010–2012); KXQZ (2012–2015)
- Call sign meaning: Twin Falls, Idaho

Technical information
- Licensing authority: FCC
- Facility ID: 69857
- Class: B
- Power: 5,000 watts day; 860 watts night
- Transmitter coordinates: 42°33′45″N 114°32′34″W
- Translator: 101.7 K269HA (Twin Falls)

Links
- Public license information: Public file; LMS
- Website: saltandlightradio.com/people/1270am-ktfi-twin-falls

KTFI (1270 AM, "Salt & Light Catholic Radio") is a radio station broadcasting a Catholic radio format. Licensed to Twin Falls, Idaho, United States, the station serves the Twin Falls metropolitan area. The station is owned by Salt & Light Radio, Inc. and features programming from EWTN.

== History ==
The station was licensed as KGIQ with General Order 40 on November 11, 1928. The original owner was Stanley M. Soule and his Radio Broadcasting Corporation, sharing time with station KGIO in Idaho Falls. KGIQ became KTFI on December 30, 1930. The studios for KTFI were located at its current transmitter site until 1940, when a new studio facility was built in downtown Twin Falls. The station originally transmitted on 1320 kHz; it moved to 1240 kHz in 1931, allowing it to go full-time, and then to 1270 kHz in 1941. It also transmitted on 99.7 KTFI-FM from October 1947 until the license was canceled at the station's request on August 18, 1955.

The Soule family owned the station until 1947, when O.P. Soule died and Florence M. Gardner bought it from the estate. Greentree Broadcasting acquired the station in 1973. Four years later, the station's call letters changed to KTLC when the format was changed to country.
