= KSOS =

Radio station in Las Vegas

Las Vegas, Nevada; United States
- Broadcast area: Las Vegas Valley
- Frequency: 90.5 MHz
- Branding: SOS Radio

Programming
- Format: Contemporary Christian
- Network: Sounds of the Spirit

Ownership
- Owner: Faith Communications

History
- First air date: July 18, 1972
- Former call signs: KILA (1972–2005)
- Former frequencies: 95.5 MHz (1972–1985)
- Call sign meaning: Sounds of the Spirit

Technical information
- Licensing authority: FCC
- Facility ID: 20528
- Class: C
- ERP: 100,000 watts
- HAAT: 387 meters (1,270 ft)
- Transmitter coordinates: 36°00′29″N 115°00′23″W

Links
- Public license information: Public file; LMS
- Webcast: Listen live
- Website: sosradio.net

KSOS (90.5 FM) is a non-commercial radio station licensed to Las Vegas, Nevada, United States, serving the Las Vegas Valley. It broadcasts a Christian contemporary music format branded "SOS Radio" and is the flagship station for the Sounds of the Spirit Radio network. Owned by Faith Communications, KSOS's studios are on South 6th Street off East Sahara Avenue.

The transmitter is on Mountain Tower Road in Henderson. Programming is simulcast on a chain of rebroadcasting stations and FM translators.

== History ==
The station signed on the air on July 18, 1972. The original call sign was KILA and the station broadcast on 95.5 FM. Its city of license was Henderson. It has always had a Christian radio format. It was a non-commercial station but it broadcast on a commercial frequency.

KILA switched frequencies on August 8, 1985, going from the commercial section of the FM dial to the section reserved for non-commercial stations. At that point, it began broadcasting on 90.5 FM with Las Vegas as its city of license. The programming became known as "Sounds of the Spirit Radio" with management adding a chain of rebroadcasting stations and FM translators around the Western United States. Reflecting its Sounds of the Spirit Radio name, KILA switched its call letters to KSOS in 2005.
