= KBAR (AM) =

- Burley, Idaho; United States
- Broadcast area: Twin Falls area
- Frequency: 1230 kHz
- Branding: 1230 AM KBAR

Programming
- Format: Talk radio
- Affiliations: Fox News Radio; Premiere Networks; Westwood One

Ownership
- Owner: Lee Family Broadcasting; (Eagle Rock Broadcasting Co Inc.)
- Sister stations: KART

History
- First air date: November 7, 1946

Technical information
- Licensing authority: FCC
- Facility ID: 42884
- Class: C
- Power: 1,000 watts (unlimited)
- Transmitter coordinates: 42°32′5″N 113°48′54″W

Links
- Public license information: Public file; LMS
- Website: am1230kbar.com

KBAR (1230 kHz) is an AM radio station broadcasting a talk radio format. Located in Burley, Idaho, United States, the station serves the Twin Falls area. The station is licensed to Eagle Rock Broadcasting Co Inc, which is owned by Lee Family Broadcasting.

KBAR began broadcasting on November 7, 1946. It was initially on 1400 kHz, a frequency now occupied by KART. It was initially owned by Mini-cassia Broadcasting. The transmitter was west of Burley. The station was only 250 watts at the time, the general limit for "graveyard" frequencies. Shortly after sign on, the station moved to its current frequency. It applied for a power increase to 1,000 watts in 1962. KBAR eventually came under the umbrella of Lee Family Broadcasting. It is currently licensed to Eagle Rock Broadcasting Co Inc, which operates as part of the Lee Family Stations group.

KBAR was an early adopter of specific religious programming, such as Sunday morning general conference sessions from the Church of Jesus Christ of Latter-day Saints.
