= Mass media in Boise, Idaho =

The Boise Metropolitan Statistical Area is served by six major television stations and one daily newspaper, as well as several weekly newspapers, commercial radio stations and online-only news sources.

== Television ==
| Station | Affiliation | Channel | Owner | City | Subchannels |
|---|---|---|---|---|---|
| KBOI | CBS | 2 | Sinclair Broadcast Group | Boise | CW+ on 2.2, Charge! on 2.3 |
| KAID | PBS | 4 | State of Idaho | Boise | IdahoPTV Plus on 4.2, Create on 4.3, World on 4.4, PBS Kids on 4.5 |
| KIVI | ABC | 6 | E. W. Scripps Company | Nampa | Boise6 on 6.2, Ion Mystery on 6.3, Bounce TV on 6.4, Laff on 6.5, Great on 6.6 |
| KTVB | NBC | 7 | Tegna Media | Boise | Idaho's Very Own 24/7 on 7.2, True Crime Network on 7.3, Quest on 7.4, The Nest on 7.5, Shop LC on 7.6, [Blank] on 7.7, Rewind TV on 7.8 |
| KNIN | FOX | 9 | Marquee Broadcasting | Caldwell | MeTV on 9.2, Oxygen on 9.3, MeTV Toons on 9.4 |
| KTRV | Ion | 12 | Inyo Broadcast Holdings | Nampa | Court TV on 12.2, Grit on 12.3, Scripps News on 12.4, Defy TV on 12.5, JTV on 12.6, QVC on 12.7, HSN on 12.8 |
| KKIC-LD | Estrella TV | 16 | Cocola Broadcasting | Boise | Shop LC on 16.2 |
| KCLP-CA | Religious | 18 | Alpha & Omega Communications, LLC | Boise | |
| KZTN-LD | TBN | 20 | Celebration Praise, LLC | Boise | TCT on 20.2, Enlace on 20.3 |
| KRID-LD | America's Voice | 22 | Karlo Maalouf | Boise | Story TV on 22.2, Heroes & Icons on 22.3, Catchy Comedy on 22.4, Movies! on 22.5, Start TV on 22.6, NOAA Weather Radio on 22.7, Ace TV on 22.8, KTSY on 22.9, KOAY on 22.10 |
| KFLL-LD | dark | 25 | DTV America | Boise | |
| KYUU-LD | CW | 28 | Sinclair Broadcast Group | Boise | Roar on 28.2, Comet on 28.3, The Nest on 28.4, Dabl on 28.5 |
| K31FD-D | 3ABN | 31 | 3ABN | Boise | 3ABN Proclaim on 31.2, Dark on 31.3, 3ABN Latino on 31.4, 3ABN Radio on 31.5, 3ABN Radio Latino on 31.6 Radio 74 on 31.7 |
| KBSE-LD | HSN | 33 | Cocola Broadcasting | Boise | GetTV on 33.2 |
| KEVA-LD | Univision | 34 | Cocola Broadcasting | Boise | |
| KKJB | Telemundo | 39 | Cocola Broadcasting | Boise | Cozi TV on 39.2, Antenna TV on 39.3, Buzzr on 39.4, [Blank] on 39.5, QVC2 on 39.6 |
| KCBB-LD | HSN 2 | 41 | Cocola Broadcasting | Boise | SBN on 41.2, Jewelry TV on 41.3, Dark on 41.4 |
| KIWB-LD | Silent | 43 | Cocola Broadcasting | Boise | |
| KZAK-LD | Dark | 49 | Cocola Broadcasting | Boise | Daystar on 49.2, TCN on 49.3 |

== Radio ==
As of 2024, Boise is the 84th largest radio market (as determined by Nielsen Media Research). It is currently the largest radio market in the United States without any radio stations owned by iHeartMedia or Audacy, Inc., the two largest owners of radio stations. On November 16, 2006, iHeartMedia's predecessor Clear Channel Communications sold 448 of its radio stations outside the top 100 markets, including radio stations in Boise (108th largest at the time), making it the largest radio market where Clear Channel was divesting its stations. The former Clear Channel stations were sold in 2007 to Peak Broadcasting LLC. In 2013, Townsquare Media acquired Peak Broadcasting LLC.

| Station | Format | Frequency | Owner | City |
|---|---|---|---|---|
| KRRB | Christian | 88.1 FM | Pensacola Christian College, Inc. | Kuna |
| KOAY | Contemporary Christian | 88.7 FM | Idaho Conference of the Seventh-day Adventist Church | Caldwell |
| KAWS | Christian talk | 89.1 FM | CSN | Marshing |
| KTSY | Contemporary Christian | 89.5 FM | Idaho Conference of the Seventh-day Adventist Church | Caldwell |
| KRBX | Community radio | 89.9 FM | Boise Community Radio Project | Caldwell |
| KBSU | Classical | 90.3 FM | Boise State Radio | Boise |
| KGCL | Spanish Christian | 90.9 FM | EMF | Jordan Valley OR |
| KBSX | NPR News | 91.5 FM | Boise State Radio | Boise |
| KIZN | Country | 92.3 FM | Cumulus Media | Boise |
| KBOI-FM | News/Talk | 93.1 FM | Cumulus Media | New Plymouth |
| K228EK | Community radio | 93.5 FM | Boise Community Radio Project | Boise |
| KBXL | Christian Talk | 94.1 FM | Inspirational Family Radio | Caldwell |
| KRVB | Adult Album Alternative | 94.9 FM | Lotus Broadcasting | Nampa |
| KSRV-FM | Variety hits | 96.1 FM | Impact Radio Group | Nampa |
| KKGL | Classic rock | 96.9 FM | Cumulus Media | Nampa |
| KQFC | Adult contemporary | 97.9 FM | Cumulus Media | Boise |
| KARO | Worship music | 98.7 FM | EMF | Nyssa OR |
| KLXI | Contemporary Christian | 99.5 FM | EMF | Fruitland |
| KQXR | Active rock | 100.3 FM | Lotus Broadcasting | Payette |
| KPDA | Regional Mexican | 100.7 FM | Radio Rancho | Mountain Home |
| KWYD | Rhythmic contemporary | 101.1 FM | Impact Radio Group | Parma |
| KQBL | Country | 101.9 FM | Impact Radio Group | Emmett |
| KZMG | Hot adult contemporary | 102.7 FM | Impact Radio Group | Melba |
| KSAS-FM | Top 40/CHR | 103.5 FM | Townsquare Media | Caldwell |
| KAWO | Country | 104.3 FM | Townsquare Media | Boise |
| KJOT | Variety hits | 105.1 FM | Lotus Broadcasting | Boise |
| KCIX | Adult Top 40 | 105.9 FM | Townsquare Media | Garden City |
| KDBI-FM | Regional Mexican | 106.3 FM | Radio Rancho | Homedale |
| KTHI | Classic country | 107.1 FM | Lotus Broadcasting | Caldwell |
| KXLT | Adult contemporary | 107.9 FM | Townsquare Media | Eagle |
| KIDO | News/Talk | 580 AM | Townsquare Media | Nampa |
| KFXD | Hip hop | 630 AM | Townsquare Media | Boise |
| KBOI | News/Talk | 670 AM | Cumulus Media | Boise |
| KSPD | Christian Talk | 790 AM | Inspirational Family Radio | Boise |
| KYWN | Spanish | 890 AM | Independent | Boise |
| KMHR | Regional Mexican | 950 AM | First Western Group | Boise |
| KBGN | Christian Talk | 1060 AM | Nelson and Karen Wilson | Caldwell |
| KGEM | Catholic Religious Talk | 1140 AM | Salt & Light Radio | Boise |
| KKOO | Oldies | 1260 AM | Impact Radio Group | Weiser |
| KTIK | Sports | 1350 AM | Cumulus Media | Nampa |
| KTRP | Silent | 1450 AM | Centro Familiar Cristiano | Notus |
| KCID | Spanish Catholic | 1490 AM | Salt & Light Radio | Caldwell |

== Public radio ==
Public radio, listener-supported (through periodic fund drives) along with corporate and private sponsors, also has a place in Boise's radio marketplace.

Boise State Public Radio operates three radio stations, KBSU 90.3 FM, KBSX 91.5 FM, and KBSU HD2. Through a system of repeater transmitters, these stations cover much of the populated area of Idaho, Eastern Oregon, and the northern border of Nevada.

KBSU concentrates on arts and entertainment, largely of classical music, but also carries a variety of other programming of news, eclectic musical tastes, and weekly programs such as Garrison Keillor's A Prairie Home Companion and Car Talk. KBSX is the Boise area's NPR outlet for news and cultural programming, while KBSU-2 provides jazz programming. These stations fill a niche in radio programming generally not covered in the mainstream commercial media and provide perspectives in culture and news not generally available elsewhere on the radio dial in this market.

KRBX 89.9 FM, Radio Boise, also serves the Treasure Valley. This is a volunteer based, listener supported, community radio station that is home to a number of locally produced public affairs programs as well as Democracy Now! It also features a variety of music programming across a broad spectrum of genres. It is run by volunteer DJs and often features local and touring bands live in studio.

== Print media ==
=== Daily ===
The Idaho Press is the Boise metropolitan area's only daily newspaper. It is also the state's largest daily newspaper. Headquartered in Nampa, it covers Ada and Canyon counties, which include Boise, Nampa, Caldwell, and Meridian.

=== Triweekly ===
The Idaho Statesman is based in Boise. It became a triweekly publication in 2023. It primarily covers the city of Boise.

=== Weekly ===
The Boise Weekly is an alternative newspaper based in downtown Boise, focusing on news, arts and opinion for the greater Boise area. The publication is owned and published by Adams MultiMedia.

The Emmett Messenger-Index is a weekly newspaper that serves Gem County. The publication is owned and published by Adams MultiMedia.

The Meridian-Kuna Press is a weekly newspaper that serves the cities of Meridian and Kuna in Ada County. The publication is owned and published by Adams MultiMedia.

The Owyhee Avalanche is a weekly newspaper in Homedale, Idaho, which is published Wednesday mornings and serves the Owyhee County area of Southwestern Idaho. It is owned by Owyhee Publishing.

Tidbits of Boise is a weekly newspaper found in places where people wait: restaurants, doctor's offices, hospitals, car repair centers, and shops. It is published locally by Boise Media Group, Inc.

=== Other ===
The Boise Journal is a city magazine based in downtown Boise, focusing on local interest, history and arts for the greater Boise area. The publication is owned and published locally.

The Boise Home is a city home magazine based in downtown Boise, focusing on local building, home products and gardening for the greater Boise area. The publication is owned and published locally.

Boise Lifestyle Magazine offers monthly family and lifestyle magazine throughout the Boise and Treasure Valley areas. The publication is locally owned and published.

== Online media ==
BoiseDev is an online-only publication that focuses on business and economic development news in Ada and Canyon counties.

Boise Journal is a news aggregator and is published by Affinity Group Publishing.

Boise Lifestyle Magazine publishes its content in print and online throughout Boise and the surrounding areas. It offers stories, events calendar and business advertising.

ZIdaho.com is Idaho's largest online classifieds. Started in 2000 by KTVB, it is now privately owned.
