= KQBL-HD3 =

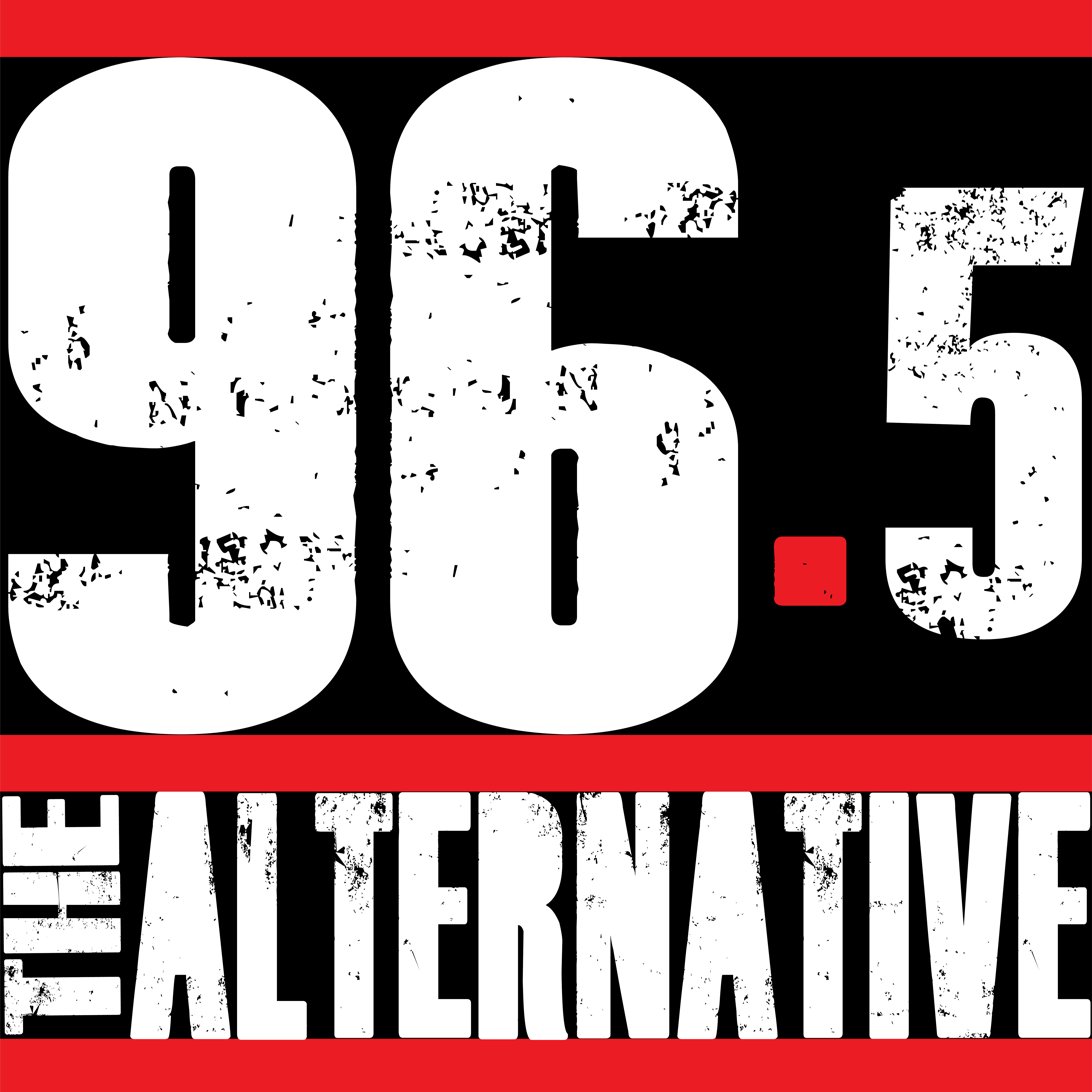
- Emmett, Idaho; United States
- Broadcast area: Boise, Idaho
- Branding: 96.5 The Alternative

Programming
- Language: English
- Format: Alternative Rock

Ownership
- Owner: Iliad Media Group
- Sister stations: KKOO, KQBL, KSRV-FM, KWYD, KZMG

History
- First air date: 2015

Links
- Webcast: Listen Live
- Website: altboise.com

KQBL-HD3 (96.5 FM) is a subchannel of KQBL, a commercial radio station licensed to Emmett, Idaho, United States, that serves the Boise metropolitan area. The station is currently owned by Iliad Media Group. Known as 96.5 The Alternative, it broadcasts an alternative rock format.

KQBL-HD3 broadcasts in HD Radio. Its studios and offices are on East Franklin Road in Nampa.

== History ==
96.5 The Alternative I-Rock was launched in 2015. It plays modern rock and indie, coupled with classic alternative hits from the 1990s and 2000s. Its featured artists include Muse, Cage the Elephant, Red Hot Chili Peppers, The Killers, and Green Day.
