= KBXN =

Radio station in Ontario, Oregon (1946–2019)

Ontario, Oregon; United States
- Broadcast area: Boise, Idaho
- Frequency: 1380 kHz

Programming
- Format: Defunct

Ownership
- Owner: Impact Radio Group; (Iliad Media Boise, LLC)
- Sister stations: KKOO, KQBL, KSRV-FM, KWYD, KZMG

History
- First air date: 1946 (as KSRV)
- Former call signs: KSRV (1946–2016); KKOO (2016–2019)

Technical information
- Facility ID: 35637
- Class: B
- Power: 5,000 watts (day); 1,000 watts (night)
- Transmitter coordinates: 44°02′35″N 116°58′22″W

KBXN (1380 AM) was a radio station licensed to serve Ontario, Oregon. The station was licensed to FM Idaho Co., LLC. The station went dark in June 2019.

== History ==
The station was assigned the KSRV call letters by the Federal Communications Commission in 1946. KSRV changed the call letters to KKOO on September 14, 2016. KKOO changed the call letters to KBXN on March 12, 2019, and began stunting. The KKOO calls and oldies format moved to 1260 AM Weiser.

KBXN's license was cancelled June 19, 2019.
