= KTHI =

Coordinates: 43.755°N 116.099°W

Caldwell, Idaho; United States
- Broadcast area: Boise metropolitan area
- Frequency: 107.1 MHz
- Branding: 107.1 Hank FM

Programming
- Format: Classic Country

Ownership
- Owner: Lotus Communications; (Lotus Boise Corp.)
- Sister stations: KJOT; KQXR; KRVB

History
- First air date: December 1, 1983; 42 years ago (as KCID-FM)
- Former call signs: KCID-FM (1983–2002)
- Call sign meaning: K T HIts (previous format)

Technical information
- Licensing authority: FCC
- Facility ID: 68589
- Class: C
- ERP: 52,000 watts
- HAAT: 786 meters (2,579 ft)

Links
- Public license information: Public file; LMS
- Webcast: Listen live
- Website: crankthehankboise.com

KTHI (107.1 FM, "107.1 Hank FM") is a commercial radio station licensed to Caldwell, Idaho, and serving the Boise metropolitan area. KTHI airs a classic country format and is owned by Lotus Communications. The studios are on Fairview Avenue in Boise near Interstate 184.

KTHI is a Class C FM station. It has an effective radiated power (ERP) of 52,000 watts. The transmitter tower is off Shafer Butte Road in Robie Creek.

== History ==
The station signed on the air on December 1, 1983. It began as a country station branded as "C-107". Its original call sign was KCID-FM, as the sister station to KCID 1490 AM, both owned by Twin Cities Broadcasting. At first, KCID-FM was powered at 3,000 watts, a fraction of its current output. It only served the city of Caldwell and adjacent communities.

In 1997, the station flipped to a Modern AC format and was rebranded as "107.1 CID". In 1998, KCID-AM-FM were acquired by Journal Communications. On May 4, 1999, KCID-FM segued to mainstream adult contemporary music and was rebranded as "Star 107.1".

In the early 2000s, KCID-FM got a big boost in power to 52,000 watts and an increase in antenna height, allowing it to be heard all around the Boise metropolitan area. In 2002, KCID-FM changed its call sign to KTHI and switched to a classic hits format. It rebranded as "107.1 K-Hits".

On May 2, 2024, as part of a series of layoffs at Lotus' Boise stations, midday host Barry Lewis and afternoon host Bridget Bonde left the station. On May 6 at 9 a.m., after playing "It's the End of the World as We Know It (And I Feel Fine)" by R.E.M., KTHI dropped the classic hits format after 22 years. It began stunting, looping a playlist of songs themed around change and declaring it was "time for a change" for the station.

At 10 a.m., KTHI flipped to classic country as "107.1 Hank FM", joining a series of stations nationwide launching the format that year. "Hank" is a reference to legendary county artist Hank Williams. The first song on "Hank" was "It's Five O'Clock Somewhere" by Alan Jackson and Jimmy Buffett. KTHI joined a crowded country music field in the Boise market, competing with three other stations - 92.3 KIZN, 101.9 KQBL and 104.3 KAWO.

Previous logo

== Ownership Changes ==
Journal Communications (KTHI's former owner) and the E. W. Scripps Company announced on July 30, 2014, that the two companies would merge to create a new broadcast company under the E.W. Scripps Company name that will own the two companies' broadcast properties, including KTHI. The transaction was completed in 2015, pending shareholder and regulatory approvals.

In January 2018, Scripps announced that it would sell all of its radio stations. In August 2018, Lotus Communications announced that it would acquire Scripps' Boise & Tucson clusters for $8 million. The sale was completed on December 12.
