= KKOO =

KKOO may refer to:

- KKOO (AM), a radio station (1260 AM) licensed to Weiser, Idaho, United States
- KBXN, a defunct radio station (1380 AM) formerly licensed to Ontario, Oregon, United States, known as KKOO from 2016 to 2019
- KLXI, a radio station (99.5 FM) licensed to Fruitland, Idaho, United States, known as KKOO from 2011 to 2016
- KWLL-FM, a radio station (106.7 FM) licensed to Rayne, Louisiana, United States, known as KKOO from 2008 to 2009
- KLSB, a radio station (97.5 FM) licensed to Goleta, California, United States, known as KKOO-FM from 1984 to 1985
