= KBOI =

KBOI may refer to:

- KBOI (AM), a radio station (670 AM) licensed to Boise, Idaho, United States
- KBOI-FM, a radio station (93.1 AM) licensed to New Plymouth, Idaho
- KBOI-TV, a television station (channel 28 digital/2 virtual) licensed to Boise, Idaho
- KQFC, a radio station (97.9 FM) licensed to Boise, Idaho, which used the call sign KBOI-FM from 1960 to 1985
- Boise Airport (ICAO code KBOI)
