= KWEI =

KWEI may refer to:

- KKOO (AM), a radio station (1260 AM) licensed to Weiser, Idaho, United States, which held the call sign KWEI from 2014 to 2018
- KTRP (AM), a radio station (1450 AM) licensed to Notus, Idaho, United States, known as KWEI from 2011 to 2014
- KLXI, a radio station (99.5 FM) licensed to Fruitland, Idaho, United States, known as KWEI-FM from 1983 to 2011

== See also ==
- Kwei, a character in Predator: Badlands
- Gui (disambiguation) (Kwei is a common non-standard romanization of Gui)
