= KTIK =

KTIK may refer to:

- KTIK (AM), a radio station (1350 AM) licensed to serve Nampa, Idaho, United States
- KBOI-FM, a radio station (93.1 FM) licensed to serve New Plymouth, Idaho, which held the call sign KTIK-FM from 2011 to 2022
- Tinker Air Force Base (ICAO code KTIK)
