= KRVB =

Radio station in Nampa–Boise, Idaho

- Nampa, Idaho; United States
- Broadcast area: Boise metropolitan area
- Frequency: 94.9 MHz (HD Radio)
- Branding: 94.9 The River

Programming
- Format: Adult Album Alternative
- Subchannels: HD2: Active rock (KQXR)

Ownership
- Owner: Lotus Communications; (Lotus Boise Corp.)
- Sister stations: KJOT, KQXR, KTHI

History
- First air date: January 10, 1975
- Former call signs: KFXD-FM (1975–1998); KFXJ (1998–2000)
- Call sign meaning: "River Boise"

Technical information
- Licensing authority: FCC
- Facility ID: 17397
- Class: C
- ERP: 49,000 watts
- HAAT: 821 meters (2,694 ft)
- Transmitter coordinates: 43.755°N 116.099°W

Links
- Public license information: Public file; LMS
- Webcast: Listen live
- Website: www.riverboise.com

KRVB (94.9 FM, "94.9 The River") is a commercial radio station licensed to Nampa, Idaho, United States, and serving the Boise metropolitan area. It airs an adult album alternative (AAA) format branded as "The River," a reference to the Boise River and Snake River, which run through the station's listening area. It is owned by Lotus Communications with studios and offices on Fairview Avenue in Boise.

The transmitter is in Robie Creek, on a tower shared with KBOI-TV.

== History ==
=== Automated Top 40 (1975–1984) ===
The station signed on the air on January 10, 1975. Its original call sign was KFXD-FM, the sister station of KFXD (580 AM). While 580 AM was a personality Top 40 station, KFXD-FM had a more music, less talk approach. It was branded as XD-FM 95 in 1979. Automated programming for KFXD-FM was supplied by Drake-Chenault's XT-40 syndicated Top 40 music service.

=== Top 40/CHR (1984–1993) ===
In 1984, it was rebranded to KF95 and flipped to a full-time, live DJ Top 40 format to compete with the then CHR station Magic 92 KBBK. KBBK was later rebranded 92 Kiss FM (KIYS) until 1990 when it switched to country music. Upon the launch of KF95, the logo and the branding was shared with Sacramento radio station FM102 (KSFM), and Atlanta's Z-93 (WZGC).

=== Adult contemporary (1993–1995) ===
A new CHR rival, Magic 93.1 (KZMG), was launched in 1991. It competed directly with KF95 until 1993, when KFXD-FM switched to an adult contemporary direction as The Legend, KF95.

=== Adult album alternative (1995–present) ===
After a brief shift to Hot AC as Mix 95 in 1995, the station's format changed to adult album alternative, restoring the KF95 moniker, positioned as The Music Difference. The call letters were changed to KFXJ in 1998, as it was no longer co-owned with the AM; KFXD.

On April 21, 2000, the station rebranded as 94.9 The River with new call letters KRVB.

=== Scripps and Lotus ownership ===
Journal Communications and the E. W. Scripps Company announced on July 30, 2014, that the two companies would merge. They would create a new broadcast company under the E. W. Scripps Company name that will own the two companies' broadcast properties, including KRVB. The transaction was slated to be completed in 2015, pending shareholder and regulatory approvals.

In January 2018, Scripps announced that it would sell all of its radio stations. In August 2018, Lotus Communications announced that it would acquire Scripps' Boise & Tucson clusters for $8 million. The sale was completed on December 12.
