= KSRV =

KSRV may refer to:

- KSRV-FM, a radio station (96.1 FM) licensed to Ontario, Oregon, United States
- KKOO (AM), a radio station (1380 AM) licensed to Ontario, Oregon, United States, which held the call sign KSRV from 1946 to 2016
