= KDBI =

KDBI may refer to:

- KDBI (AM), a defunct radio station (730 AM) formerly licensed to serve Boise, Idaho, United States
- KDBI-FM, a radio station (106.3 FM) licensed to serve Homedale, Idaho
