= KTRP =

KTRP refers to the following broadcasting stations in the United States:

- KTRP (AM), a radio station (1450 AM) licensed to serve Notus, Idaho, United States
- KKOO (AM), a radio station (1260 AM) licensed to Weiser, Idaho, which held the call sign KTRP from 2011 to 2014
- KQRR, a radio station (1130 AM) licensed to Mount Angel, Oregon, which held the call sign KTRP from 2007 to 2010
