= KINF =

KINF or Kinf may refer to:

- KINF-LP, a low-power radio station (107.9 FM) licensed to serve Palestine, Texas, United States
- KDBI (AM), a defunct radio station (730 AM) formerly licensed to serve Boise, Idaho, which held the call sign KINF from 2011 to 2013
- KPDA (FM), a radio station (100.7 FM) licensed to serve Mountain Home, Idaho, which held the call sign KINF-FM from 2011 to 2013
- KXTA-FM, a radio station (99.1 FM) licensed to serve Gooding, Idaho, United States, which held the call sign KINF from 2013 to 2014
- Kids In Need Foundation, a U.S. charity
