= KQTA =

KQTA may refer to:

- KQTA-LD, a low-power television station (channel 13) licensed to serve San Francisco, California, United States
- KDBI-FM, a radio station (106.3 FM) licensed to serve Homedale, Idaho, United States, which held the call sign KQTA from 2005 to 2015
