= KSAS-FM =

Coordinates: 43.75489°N 116.09873°W

- Caldwell, Idaho; United States
- Broadcast area: Boise metropolitan area
- Frequency: 103.5 MHz
- Branding: 103.5 Kiss FM

Programming
- Format: Top 40 (CHR)
- Affiliations: Premiere Networks

Ownership
- Owner: Townsquare Media; (Townsquare License, LLC)
- Sister stations: KAWO, KCIX, KFXD, KIDO, KXLT-FM

History
- First air date: September 28, 1982 (as KQZQ at 103.1)
- Former call signs: KQZQ (1982–1984); KLCI (1984–1987); KHEZ (1987–1995); KARO (1995–2000)
- Former frequencies: 103.1 MHz (1982–1987); 103.3 MHz (1987–2013)
- Call sign meaning: Sounds like “kiss”

Technical information
- Licensing authority: FCC
- Facility ID: 63920
- Class: C
- ERP: 54,000 watts
- HAAT: 786 meters (2,579 ft)

Links
- Public license information: Public file; LMS
- Webcast: Listen Live
- Website: 1035kissfmboise.com

KSAS-FM (103.5 MHz, "Kiss-FM") is a commercial radio station located in Caldwell, Idaho, broadcasting to the Boise, Idaho area. KSAS-FM airs a Top 40 (CHR) music format.

The station made headlines in April 2008 when its afternoon disc jockey, Steve "KeKe Luv" Kicklighter, set an unofficial world record by going 175 consecutive hours without sleep, on the air. The stunt was timed to the start of National Child Abuse Prevention Month, in order to bring attention to that cause. In April 2009, Keke Luv ran 7 marathons in 7 days to raise awareness to child abuse.

== History ==
Before becoming top 40 KSAS had the KARO call letters which now belong to a Christian worship music station in Boise. In the mid-1990s, KARO was an all '70s music format as Arrow 103 until 1997 when KARO switched to an AOR rock format, competing between classic rock KKGL, then Active Rock J105 and alternative leaning KQXR. Going back to the station's beginnings as KQZQ, they originally aired an automated adult Top 40 format (TM Production's "Stereo Rock" format) as Z-103.

=== 1984-1987; KLCI Classy 103; Adult Contemporary ===
In 1984, the station adopted the Adult Contemporary format as Classy 103 FM (KLCI). One of the first FM AC stations in the Boise market. The station competed with 67 KBOI, and later KWB FM 104 (KUUB) and K-106 FM (KCIX), which the latter signed on the air on January 1, 1985.

=== 1987-1995; KHEZ EZ-103; Move to 103.3; Easy Listening ===
In 1987, the station frequency moved to 103.3 MHz and switched to the easy listening format branded as EZ-103 FM with the call signs, KHEZ.

=== 2000-present; CHR ===
In 2000 KARO flipped to Top 40/CHR becoming 103.3 Kiss FM, making the return of the Kiss FM moniker in the Boise market for the first time since the former CHR station KIYS dropped 92 Kiss FM and switched to country as Kissin' 92 (KIZN) ten years prior. It became a formidable competition to the other top 40's in the Treasure Valley. From 2000 to 2013 the other stations Music Monster 99.1 (KTPZ as an all-80s format) and 93.1 Hit Music Now (KZMG [now KBOI-FM]) exited the format.

On November 16, 2006, Clear Channel Communications planned to sell 448 of its radio stations outside the top 100 markets including the company's Boise stations: KSAS-FM, KCIX, KTMY (now KAWO), KXLT-FM, KIDO, and KFXD. In March 2007, Peak Broadcasting LLC bought the stations.

On August 30, 2013, a deal was announced in which Townsquare Media would purchase Peak Broadcasting's stations, including KSAS-FM, as part of the deal in which Cumulus Media would acquire Dial Global. As part of the deal, Townsquare swapped Peak's stations in Fresno, California, to Cumulus for its stations in Dubuque, Iowa, and Poughkeepsie, New York; Peak, Townsquare, and Dial Global were all controlled by Oaktree Capital Management. The sale to Townsquare was completed on November 14, 2013.

On October 31, 2013, at 5 p.m., KSAS moved from 103.3 FM to 103.5 FM. The realignment allowed for KZMG to return albeit as an Adult top 40 station. The last song on 103.3 Kiss FM was "Let The Children Play" by local rapper Infectious, and the first on 103.5 Kiss FM was "Baby Got Back" by Sir Mix-a-Lot.

== In popular culture ==
In the 1988 comedy film Moving, the billboard ad for the radio station EZ-103 FM can be briefly seen when the Pear family arrived to Boise.
