= KBSU =

KBSU may refer to:

- KBSU (FM), a radio station (90.3 FM) licensed to serve Boise, Idaho, United States
- KDBI (AM), a defunct radio station (730 AM) formerly licensed to serve Boise, which held the call sign KBSU from 1992 to 2011
