= KTMB =

KTMB may refer to:

- Keretapi Tanah Melayu Berhad, Malaysian railway
- KRAK (FM), formerly KTMB, a radio station licensed to Anchorage, Alaska, US
- KPDA (FM), formerly KTMB, a radio station licensed to Mountain Home, Idaho, US
- Miami Executive Airport, Florida, US (ICAO code)
