= KXLT =

KXLT may refer to:

- KXLT-FM, a radio station (107.9 FM) licensed to Eagle, Idaho, United States
- KXLT-TV, a television station (digital channel 26, virtual 47) licensed to Rochester, Minnesota, United States
