= KOAY =

KOAY may refer to:

- KOAY (FM), a radio station (88.7 FM) licensed to serve Middleton, Idaho, United States
- KZNS-FM, a radio station (97.5 FM) licensed to serve Coalville, Utah, United States, which held the call sign KOAY from 2006 to 2008
