= KIKX =

Adult hits radio station in Ketchum, Idaho, United States

Coordinates: 43.279°N 114.155°W

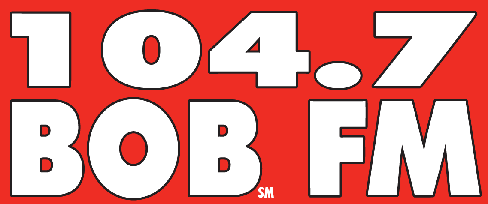
- Ketchum, Idaho; United States
- Broadcast area: Twin Falls, Idaho
- Frequency: 104.7 MHz
- Branding: 104.7 BOB FM

Programming
- Format: Adult hits
- Affiliations: Bob FM network

Ownership
- Owner: Iliad Media Group Holdings Employee Stock Ownership Trust; (Iliad Media Group Holdings Inc.)
- Sister stations: KIRQ; KKOO; KQBL; KSRV-FM; KTPZ; KWYD; KYUN; KZMG

History
- First air date: 1996
- Former call signs: KYAA (1991–1993); KRMR (1993–1996)

Technical information
- Licensing authority: FCC
- Facility ID: 28217
- Class: C
- ERP: 100,000 watts
- HAAT: 481 meters (1,578 ft)

Links
- Public license information: Public file; LMS
- Webcast: Listen live
- Website: 1047bobfm.com

KIKX (104.7 FM, "104.7 BOB FM") is a commercial radio station located in Ketchum, Idaho, broadcasting to the Twin Falls area. KIKX airs an adult hits music format. On September 7, 2009, KIKX evolved from classic rock to adult hits as "104.7 BOB FM".
