= KTPZ =

Coordinates: 42.732°N 114.419°W

- Hazelton, Idaho; United States
- Broadcast area: Magic Valley
- Frequency: 92.7 MHz
- Branding: 92.7 KTPZ

Programming
- Format: Top 40/CHR
- Affiliations: Compass Media Networks

Ownership
- Owner: Iliad Media Group Holdings Employee Stock Ownership Trust; (Iliad Media Group Holdings Inc.)
- Sister stations: KIKX, KIRQ, KKOO, KQBL, KSRV-FM, KWYD, KYUN, KZMG

History
- First air date: 2006 (as KTPD)
- Former call signs: KTPD (2005–2006); KMPA (2006–2007)

Technical information
- Licensing authority: FCC
- Facility ID: 164127
- Class: C3
- ERP: 4,900 watts
- HAAT: 226 meters

Links
- Public license information: Public file; LMS
- Webcast: Listen Live
- Website: ktpz927.com

KTPZ (92.7 FM) is a commercial radio station located in Twin Falls, Idaho, broadcasting to the Magic Valley area. KTPZ airs a Top 40/CHR music format branded as "The Music Monster". The call sign and the branding was previously used in Mountain Home, Idaho serving Boise with the all '80s Hits format also on 99.1 FM as 99.1 The Point, (now the modern rock format with KQBL-HD2 as the call letters).

== Previous logo ==
(KTPZ's logo under former 99.1 FM frequency)
