= KIRQ =

Coordinates: 43.279°N 114.155°W

- Hailey, Idaho; United States
- Broadcast area: Twin Falls, Idaho
- Frequency: 106.7 MHz
- Branding: Sunny 106.7

Programming
- Format: Adult contemporary

Ownership
- Owner: Iliad Media Group Holdings Employee Stock Ownership Trust; (Iliad Media Group Holdings Inc.)
- Sister stations: KIKX, KKOO, KQBL, KSRV-FM, KTPZ, KWYD, KYUN, KZMG

History
- First air date: 2006 (as KYUN)
- Former call signs: KYUN (2006–2015)

Technical information
- Licensing authority: FCC
- Facility ID: 166021
- Class: C
- ERP: 97,000 watts
- HAAT: 481 meters (1,578 ft)

Links
- Public license information: Public file; LMS
- Webcast: Listen live
- Website: www.sunnytwinfalls.com

KIRQ (106.7 FM) is a commercial radio station located in Hailey, Idaho, broadcasting to the Twin Falls, Idaho, area. KIRQ airs an adult contemporary format branded as "Sunny 106.7".

Previous logo
