= Boise Weekly =

- Type: Alternative weekly
- Format: Independent news, art, and opinion
- Owner: Adams MultiMedia
- Publisher: Matt Davison
- Editor-in-chief: Jeanne Huff
- Founded: 1992
- Headquarters: 855 Broad St Suite 100. Boise, ID, 83702; US
- Circulation: 15,000 (as of 2021)
- Website: boiseweekly.com

Boise Weekly is a newspaper in Boise, Idaho, United States. It was founded in 1992 by Andy and Debi Hedden-Nicely and Larry Regan.

It is owned by Adams MultiMedia's Western Division and is part of The Idaho Press.

It is published weekly on Wednesday. Its market is southwestern Idaho from McCall on the northwest to Sun Valley to the east.

In February 2000, the paper was sold to the Portland, Oregon-based City of Roses Newspaper Company, which also owns two other alt-weekly newspapers, Willamette Week and the Santa Fe Reporter, but only a year and a half later, in August 2001, City of Roses sold the Boise Weekly to Mark ("Bingo") Barnes and Sally Barnes (nee Freeman). Bingo Barnes became its publisher and editor-in-chief. The Barneses were married, but they later divorced and Sally Barnes resumed using her unmarried name of Sally Freeman. In 2007, Bingo Barnes left to become publisher of the Anchorage Press and in 2013 became the editor of Kuna Melba News in Kuna, Idaho. Freeman became full owner of the Boise Weekly, also remaining its publisher.

== See also ==
- Media in Boise, Idaho
