= KFXD =

Radio station in Idaho. United States

- Boise, Idaho; United States
- Broadcast area: Boise metropolitan area
- Frequency: 630 kHz
- Branding: Power 105.5

Programming
- Format: Rhythmic contemporary
- Affiliations: Compass Media Networks; Idaho Vandals

Ownership
- Owner: Townsquare Media; (Townsquare License, LLC)
- Sister stations: KAWO; KCIX; KIDO; KSAS-FM; KXLT-FM

History
- First air date: 1922; 104 years ago
- Former call signs: KFAU (1922–1928); KIDO (1928–2002)
- Former frequencies: 833/619 kHz (1922–1923); 833 kHz (1923); 1110 kHz (1923–1924); 1090 kHz (1924–1925); 1080 kHz (1925); 1060 kHz (1925–1927); 1070 kHz (1927); 1050 kHz (1927–1928); 1250 kHz (1928–1931); 1350 kHz (1931–1941); 1380 kHz (1941–1951)

Technical information
- Licensing authority: FCC
- Facility ID: 63915
- Class: D
- Power: 5,000 watts daytime; 37 watts nighttime
- Transmitter coordinates: 43°30′56.3″N 116°20′1.4″W
- Translator: 105.5 K288HG (Boise)

Links
- Public license information: Public file; LMS
- Webcast: Listen live
- Website: power105boise.com

KFXD (630 AM) is a commercial radio station, owned by Townsquare Media, which airs a rhythmic contemporary format branded as "Power 105.5". The station is licensed to serve Boise, Idaho.

The station's brand references low-powered FM translator K288HG at 105.5 FM. The main AM signal operates at 5,000 watts during the day, but must drop to 37 watts at night, rendering it all but unlistenable even in Boise. The FM translator serves mainly to fill in gaps in the nighttime signal.

== History ==
KFXD's first broadcasting station license, as KFAU, was issued in July 1922 to the Boise High School in Boise, Idaho. However, at this time the school already had extensive experience in radio activities, including broadcasting.

Following the entrance of the United States into World War I in 1917, the high school was selected as one of the sites to be used for training Signal Corps radio operators. After the end of the war, a ban on civilian radio stations was lifted, and in early 1920 the school was issued a license to operate a "Technical and Training School" station, with the call sign 7YA. This station was under the oversight of Harry E. Redeker, one of the school's teachers. Initially it only had a radiotelegraph transmitter, which limited it to Morse code transmissions. In addition to providing technical training for students, the station was active as a "relay station" retransmitting messages from amateur radio stations, and in 1921 the American Radio Relay League's QST magazine described 7YA as "one of our best relay stations on the route to the east".

Initially, there were no formal restrictions for which radio station license categories could make broadcasts intended for the general public. In 1921, 7YA added a 5-watt homemade radiotelephone transmitter, and began a limited schedule of broadcasts, consisting of "classroom work, news and market reports". However, effective December 1, 1921, the Department of Commerce, which regulated U.S. radio at this time, adopted a regulation that stations making broadcasts intended for the general public now had to hold a Limited Commercial license. On July 18, 1922, the school was issued its first broadcasting station license, with the call letters KFAU, assigned to "Boise High School, independent school district of Boise City". This authorized operation on both the 360 meter (833 kHz) "entertainment" wavelength and the 485 meter (619 kHz) "market and weather report" wavelength. KFAU was Idaho's third broadcasting station authorization, and its call sign was randomly assigned from an alphabetic roster of available call letters. (7YA's license continued to be active, although now limited to training activities and relay work). KFAU's studio was located underneath the stage at the high school.

Harry Redeker continued as KFAU's station manager until he left the school's faculty in 1928. That fall the school decided to sell the station to C. G. Phillips and Frank L. Hill, doing business as the Boise Broadcasting Station, and the call letters were changed to KIDO.

In the 1930s or early 1940s the station purchased property at the end of Wylie Lane to construct a station and antenna. The station later moved to studios and offices on the 5th floor of the Owyee Plaza Hotel.

=== 2002 KIDO / KFXD call letter swap ===
On August 14, 2002, stations KIDO and KFXD exchanged call signs, with AM 580 becoming KIDO, and AM 630 becoming KFXD. For the general listening public, this resulted in the two familiar call signs appearing on new dial positions, with KFXD's call letters, classic country format and staff moving to 630 in order to move KIDO's news/talk format to the stronger 580 AM. However, the FCC generally traces station identities by individual facilities rather than call signs. In this case, the "new" KFXD operates under the same license previously issued to the "old" KIDO.

On November 16, 2006, Clear Channel Communications planned to sell 448 of its radio stations outside the top 100 markets including KFXD, along with Boise sister stations KSAS-FM, KCIX, KTMY (now KAWO), KXLT-FM and KIDO. In March 2007, Peak Broadcasting LLC bought the Boise stations.

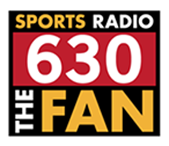
Logo as "630 The Fan"

Up until July 2, 2007, KFXD was a classic country format. It switched to All Talk 63 KFXD that morning. On October 15, 2008, KFXD's talk radio lineup was absorbed by sister station KIDO as the two stations began to simulcast. In October 2011. KFXD changed its format to sports, branded as "630 The Fan". KFXD later lost the rights to broadcast Boise State Broncos athletics, to rival AM station 670 KBOI.

On August 30, 2013, it was announced that Townsquare Media would purchase Peak Broadcasting's stations, including KFXD. The transaction was part of Cumulus Media's acquisition of Dial Global; Townsquare concurrently swapped Peak's stations in Fresno, California, to Cumulus for its stations in Dubuque, Iowa, and Poughkeepsie, New York. Peak, Townsquare, and Dial Global were all controlled by Oaktree Capital Management. The sale to Townsquare was completed on November 14, 2013.

On October 23, 2020, KFXD dropped its sports format and began stunting with songs containing "change" in their titles, jokingly branded as "105.5 Darrell FM", a reference aimed at crosstown competitor Iliad Media Group's CEO, Darrell Calton, because it was reported that during the previous few weeks he had been cybersquatting on multiple web domain names for KFXD's frequency. At noon on October 26, KFXD flipped to rhythmic contemporary, branded as "Power 105.5".
