= WLRB (FM) =

- Ocean City, New Jersey; United States
- Broadcast area: Atlantic City, New Jersey
- Frequency: 102.7 MHz
- Branding: K-Love

Programming
- Format: Contemporary Christian
- Network: K-Love

Ownership
- Owner: Educational Media Foundation
- Sister stations: WEZW

History
- First air date: August 1991
- Former call signs: WSKR (1991–1994); WJSE (1994–2010); WWAC (2010–2019)

Technical information
- Licensing authority: FCC
- Facility ID: 51575
- Class: A
- ERP: 4,100 watts
- HAAT: 121.7 meters (399 ft)
- Transmitter coordinates: 39°21′4.4″N 74°26′52.5″W

Links
- Public license information: Public file; LMS
- Webcast: Listen Live
- Website: klove.com

WLRB (102.7 FM) is a non-commercial radio station located in the Atlantic City area on 102.7 FM. The station serves Atlantic, Cape May, Cumberland and Southern Ocean Counties in New Jersey. The transmitter is located on the roof of the Ocean Club Condominium Complex in Atlantic City.

== History ==
=== Early years ===
The station began broadcasting from Petersburg in August 1991 as WSKR with a locally produced sports format. "Score 102–7" eventually simulcast Philadelphia sports station WIP (610 AM) from 6 a.m. to 6 p.m. weekdays.

The station changed its call sign to WJSE in November 1994, broadcasting various versions of a rock format. From November 1999 until December 16, 2005, WJSE was the South Jersey home of the syndicated Howard Stern Show. On January 8, 2006, the Scotty and Alex Show replaced Stern after he moved his radio show to Sirius Satellite Radio and in February 2007, the syndicated Mancow Show replaced Scotty and Alex after the duo moved their show over to Free FM formatted WYSP in Philadelphia.

On December 16, 2005, the last day of Howard Stern's terrestrial radio show, WJSE along with many of the other soon to be former Stern affiliates including flagship station WXRK in New York City broadcast Stern's last show live over the Internet, which until then was strictly forbidden under the syndication agreement between Stern, his production company One-Twelve, Inc., his employer CBS Radio, the syndicator Westwood One and the affiliates that broadcast The Howard Stern Show.

The station was a finalist for Radio and Records magazine's 2007 Industry Achievement Award for best Alternative Station for markets 100 and up. Other finalists included WKZQ-FM, KQXR, WBTZ, KXNA, and WSFM.

By 2006, WJSE shifted from alternative rock as "Digital 102.7" to active rock as "102.7 The Ace". In late July 2008, it became "102.7 JSE Rocks". The active rock format shifted back to alternative rock by 2009.

=== Wild 102.7 ===
In May 2010, speculation began swirling around a format flip for WJSE. It was speculated that WJSE was to flip to a simulcast of WPTY on Long Island. The rumors became reality on July 1, 2010, when it was confirmed that WJSE would indeed flip to a rhythmic top 40/dance format, and adopt the revamped moniker "Wild 102-7, Atlantic City's New Party Station". It changed its call sign to WWAC and city of license to Ocean City, all to improve signal coverage. The station was launched on July 2, 2010, at 9:55 p.m. after a 1–2 minute stunt of a patriotic marching song.

As of 2011, WWAC's playlist shifted more toward a contemporary hit radio format.

=== AC 102.7 ===
On September 19, 2011, the station changed its name to AC 102.7, retaining the contemporary hit radio format.

=== Sale to EMF ===
On June 20, 2018, Longport Media sold WWAC to the Educational Media Foundation for $570,000. The sale was consummated on July 10, 2019, at which point the station changed its call sign to WLRB. On July 11, 2019, the station went dark and returned to the air the following day, switching to the national K-Love feed.
