= KKGL =

Coordinates: 43.756°N 116.099°W

- Nampa, Idaho; United States
- Broadcast area: Boise metropolitan area
- Frequency: 96.9 MHz
- Branding: 96.9 The Eagle

Programming
- Format: Classic rock
- Affiliations: Westwood One

Ownership
- Owner: Cumulus Media; (Radio License Holding CBC, LLC)
- Sister stations: KBOI, KBOI-FM, KIZN, KQFC, KTIK

History
- First air date: February 1977
- Former call signs: KUUZ (1977–1982); KBNY (1982–1986); KFML (1986–1987); KLCI (1987–1997)
- Call sign meaning: Eagle

Technical information
- Licensing authority: FCC
- Facility ID: 51212
- Class: C
- ERP: 48,000 watts
- HAAT: 828 meters (2,717 ft)

Links
- Public license information: Public file; LMS
- Webcast: Listen live; Listen live; Listen live (via iHeartRadio); Listen live (via Audacy)
- Website: kkgl.com

KKGL (96.9 FM, "The Eagle") is a commercial radio station licensed to Nampa, Idaho, United States, and serving the Boise metropolitan area. Owned by Cumulus Media, it airs a classic rock format, with studios and offices are on West Bannock Street in downtown Boise.

KKGL's transmitter is situated off Shafer Butte Road in Robie Creek.

== History ==
The station signed on the air in February 1977. The original call sign was KUUZ. It had an automated Top 40 format. It was co-owned with 1340 KAIN with studios on 5th Street South in Nampa.

In 1982 the station changed its call letters to KBNY and aired a middle-of-the-road (MOR) format.

The station later switched to an adult contemporary format. In 1986, the call letters were changed to KFML branded as “KFM-97”.

In 1987, the station picked up the KLCI call letters (which had recently been dropped by 103.3 in Boise.) By 1989, the station was known as Boise's new "Rock 97" with an adult rock format.

By 1993, KLCI had evolved to classic rock as “Classic Rock 97.” In the mid-1990s, KLCI rebranded as “B96.9, Boise’s Best Rock” with mostly classics and a few current adult-appeal titles. In 1997, the station committed to classic rock as “96.9 The Eagle” with the KKGL call letters.
