= KYUN =

Coordinates: 42.732°N 114.419°W

- Twin Falls, Idaho; United States
- Broadcast area: Twin Falls, Idaho
- Frequency: 102.1 MHz (HD Radio)
- Branding: 102.1 The Bull

Programming
- Format: Country
- Subchannels: HD2: 105.1 I-Rock (Active rock); HD3: Magic 95.1 (Oldies)

Ownership
- Owner: Iliad Media Group Holdings Employee Stock Ownership Trust; (Iliad Media Group Holdings Inc.)
- Sister stations: KIKX, KIRQ, KKOO, KQBL, KSRV-FM, KTPZ, KWYD, KZMG

History
- First air date: 2007 (as KIRQ)
- Former call signs: KISI (2005–2006); KISY (2006–2007); KIRQ (2007–2015)

Technical information
- Licensing authority: FCC
- Facility ID: 164129
- Class: C3
- ERP: 5,200 watts
- HAAT: 220 meters (720 ft)
- Translators: HD2: 105.1 K286CH (Twin Falls); HD3: 95.1 K236BS (Twin Falls)

Links
- Public license information: Public file; LMS
- Webcast: Listen live (HD2); Listen live (HD3)
- Website: bull1021.com irock1051.com (HD2) magictwinfalls.com (HD3)

KYUN (102.1 FM, "The Bull") is a commercial radio station located in Twin Falls, Idaho. KYUN airs a country music format.

== History ==
On February 10, 2016, KYUN rebranded from "102.1 The Canyon" to "102.1 The Bull".
