= KDBI (AM) =

Former simulcast of KDBI-FM
- Boise, Idaho; United States
- Broadcast area: Boise, Idaho
- Frequency: 730 kHz
- Branding: La Gran D

Programming
- Format: Regional Mexican

Ownership
- Owner: Kevin Terry; (Radio Rancho, LLC)
- Sister stations: KDBI-FM; KPDA

History
- First air date: December 4, 1955 (as KYME at 740)
- Last air date: May 30, 2023
- Former call signs: KYME (1955–1984); KTOX (1984–1987); KIZN (1987–1990); KUCL (1990–1992); KBSU (1992–2011); KINF (2011–2013); KNFL (2013–2017)
- Former frequencies: 740 kHz (1955–1984)

Technical information
- Facility ID: 28252
- Class: B
- Power: 15,000 watts day; 500 watts night
- Transmitter coordinates: 43°30′56″N 116°19′43″W
- Translator: 106.7 K294DC (Boise)

Links
- Website: www.lagrand1063.com/home/

KDBI (730 kHz) was an AM radio station in Boise, Idaho. The station was last owned by Kevin Terry, through licensee Radio Rancho, LLC.

== History ==
The station signed on the air in 1955 as KYME at 740 kHz. In 1984, it became KTOX and moved to the 730 kHz frequency. It became KBSU with a jazz format in 1992. However, in 2011, Boise State University sold the station to Impact Radio Group for $165,000. On July 21, 2011, Impact changed the calls to KINF and adopted a conservative-leaning news-talk format. It simulcast the first two hours of America's Morning News with KINF-FM, as well as KINF-FM's entire weekend schedule.

On January 1, 2013, after a few days of stunting with a loop of "Thriller" by Michael Jackson, KINF split from the simulcast with KINF-FM and flipped to sports, with programming from ESPN Radio. On April 30, 2013, KINF began simulcasting on translator K243BM (96.5 FM). On October 1, 2013, KINF changed its call sign to KNFL.

On February 24, 2017, KNFL began stunting once again with a loop directing listeners to KQBL-HD2 and translator K256CZ (99.1 FM), as the "ESPN Boise" sports format moved to those frequencies. The station changed its call sign to KDBI on March 10, 2017. Effective May 31, 2017, Kevin Terry's Radio Rancho, LLC purchased KDBI and translators K224EP and K294DC from Impact Radio Group in exchange for the license to translator K256CZ and $35,000. On June 5, 2017, KDBI ended stunting and began simulcasting Regional Mexican-formatted KDBI-FM 106.3.

Radio Rancho surrendered KDBI's license to the Federal Communications Commission on May 30, 2023, and it was cancelled the same day.
