= KBGN =

Radio station in Caldwell, Idaho

- Caldwell, Idaho; United States
- Broadcast area: Boise metropolitan area
- Frequency: 1060 kHz

Programming
- Format: Christian radio
- Affiliations: USA Radio News

Ownership
- Owner: Nelson M. And Karen E. Wilson

History
- First air date: October 5, 1960; 65 years ago (on 910)
- Former frequencies: 910 kHz (1960–1977)

Technical information
- Licensing authority: FCC
- Facility ID: 48249
- Class: D
- Power: 10,000 watts day
- Transmitter coordinates: 43°43′12.59″N 116°32′1.48″W

Links
- Public license information: Public file; LMS
- Website: kbgnradio.com

KBGN (1060 AM) is a daytime only radio station licensed to Caldwell, Idaho, and serving the Boise metropolitan area. The station broadcasts a Christian radio format and is owned by Nelson M. and Karen E. Wilson.

The station is a member of the Idaho State Broadcasters Association. The station is an affiliate of ETS Radio Ministry. It also carries two programs from Revive Our Hearts, a global ministry for women. The station also carries local religious programming at times.

By day, KBGN’s power is 10,000 watts, using a non-directional antenna. As 1060 AM is a clear channel frequency reserved for Class A stations KYW in Philadelphia and XECPAE in Mexico City, KBGN must go off the air at sunset to avoid interference. It is considered a "daytmer". The transmitter is on Blessinger Road near Willis Road in Star, Idaho. KBGN was mentioned in a report from the United States Senate in 1979 regarding the effects of additional stations on clear channel frequencies, as well as an establishment of a commission to improve domestic, international and rural communications. KBGN was listed among the daytimers, protecting KYW and XECPAE.

== History ==
In the 1950s, evangelist and Southern gospel singer F. Demcy Mylar and architect Harold Shaw sought to put a Christian radio station on the air in the Boise area. They formed the Christian Broadcasting Company of Idaho. The Federal Communications Commission (FCC) granted the company a construction permit on July 14, 1960.

KBGN signed on the air on October 5, 1960, from studios on East Chicago Street in Caldwell. It originally broadcast on 910 kilohertz. Its power was 1,000 watts, as a daytimer, required to go off the air at night. It was the first Christian radio station in Idaho and the only one for 15 years. Mylar served as the original general manager.

The station had an FM counterpart on 94.1 MHz simulcasting the same programming from 910 AM beginning in 1961. It was known as KBGN-FM. It is now known as KBXL. KBGN and its FM counterpart were mentioned in a 1968 report regarding the Fairness Doctrine. The report dealt with a number of complaints the Federal Communications Commission received regarding syndicated programming. KBGN was mentioned as airing a religious program "Showers of Blessing", originating from Kansas City, Missouri. The program was described as a "Bible gospel-type program" that occasionally dealt with public morals.

When Caldwell relocated its airport in the 1970s, KBGN was told its tower site would be taken for the airport's construction. The airport opened in 1976 with an application pending at the FCC to relocate the AM transmitter site. With the relocation, KBGN moved to 1060 kHz on September 30, 1977, broadcasting with 10,000 watts. That expanded the coverage area to much of Southwest Idaho and part of Oregon. The transmitting tower was once used as an auxiliary site for KBXL, before it moved to Deer Point, east of downtown Boise.
