= KBOI-FM =

News/talk radio station in New Plymouth–Boise, Idaho

Simulcast of KBOI, Boise
- New Plymouth, Idaho; United States
- Broadcast area: Boise metropolitan area
- Frequency: 93.1 MHz
- Branding: News Talk KBOI

Programming
- Format: Talk radio
- Affiliations: ABC News Radio; Fox News Radio; Westwood One

Ownership
- Owner: Cumulus Media; (Radio License Holding CBC, LLC)
- Sister stations: KBOI, KIZN, KKGL, KQFC, KTIK

History
- First air date: March 17, 1982
- Former call signs: KIZN (1982–1986); KIZN-FM (1986–1990); KZMG (1990–2011); KTIK-FM (2011–2022)
- Call sign meaning: "Boise"

Technical information
- Licensing authority: FCC
- Facility ID: 39609
- Class: C
- ERP: 48,000 watts
- HAAT: 828 meters (2,717 ft)
- Transmitter coordinates: 43.756°N 116.099°W
- Repeater: 670 KBOI (Boise)

Links
- Public license information: Public file; LMS
- Webcast: Listen live; Listen live; Listen live (via iHeartRadio)
- Website: kboi.com

KBOI-FM (93.1 FM) is a commercial radio station licensed to New Plymouth, Idaho, United States, and serving the Boise metropolitan area. Owned by Cumulus Media, KBOI-FM simulcasts a talk format with KBOI (670 AM) branded as "News Talk KBOI". Studios and offices are on Bannock Street in Downtown Boise. KBOI-FM shares a tower with KBOI-TV (channel 2) located in Robie Creek.

== History ==
=== Country (1982-1990) ===
The station signed on the air on March 17, 1982. KIZN was the FM counterpart to KTOX 730 AM (now silent). The two stations were owned by Constant Communications and they simulcast a talk radio format. The studios were on West Franklin Street.

The simulcast only lasted a few months until the studios for the FM station were ready. At that point, KIZN broke away from the simulcast and began airing a country music format. The call sign was pronounced "Kissin'".

=== Adult contemporary (1990–1991) ===
In April 1990,Kissin' 93 moved over to 92.3 FM on dial. It was the former frequency for CHR/Top 40 station (previously branded as 92 Kiss FM under the previous call letters KIYS). The shift left Boise without a true Top 40/CHR radio station. Future competitor KF95 (94.9 KFXD-FM) had no interest in playing music by rhythmic and hip-hop artists due to low population of African-Americans in the Treasure Valley at the time. In its place came KZMG Magic 93 with an adult contemporary format.

=== Top 40 (1991–2011) ===
==== Magic 93.1 ====
In 1991, the station became changed to a CHR/Top 40 format as Magic 93.1, targeting younger listeners in the Boise market. It went head to head with KF95. After a rough initial launch, the station eventually took down heritage rival KF95 to become the dominant AC/AAA station throughout the decade. The station made headlines when popular KFXD jock Evan "The Hitman" (Evan McIntyre) abruptly bailed on his shift and called in to Magic to announce that he was "leaving the towers of Amity Road behind".

Magic's popularity began a steady decline after 105.9 KCIX raided Magic's talent roster. That resulted in the loss of several personalities, including PD and morning show host Mike Kasper and co-host Kate McGwire. While KCIX's attempt to take over the Top-40 market fell short, the damage from losing the morning show proved costly. A laundry list of morning show experiments and frequent talent turnover did little to solve the problem.

When 103.3 KSAS-FM was launched in 2000, Magic 93.1 and KSAS-FM immediately began a head-to-head match-up, and the two stations see-sawed back and forth in the ratings. In the beginning, KSAS featured talent voicetracked from other markets, while KZMG adopted a live and local approach. However, when KSAS turned to more local stunts and events, KZMG got knocked down to third place as it turned to syndication.

==== 93-1 Hit Music Now ====
On October 5, 2009, KZMG dropped the heritage "Magic" name and reverted to the slogan "93.1 Hit Music Now". But it still kept its existing Top 40/CHR format. The logo and branding was similar to CBS Radio's KAMP-FM (from Los Angeles), WNOW-FM (from New York City), WVMV (from Detroit) and Beasley Broadcasting's KFRH (from Las Vegas). The new imaging also featured shorter DJ interruptions and a playlist adjustment to better compete with KSAS.

Despite the change, the rise of another rival, 101.1 KWYD, changed the dynamics of the Boise Top-40 wars. It became evident that Boise could not support three Top-40 stations. This, along with corresponding advances in digital music storage technology such as iPods and the Internet, essentially doomed KZMG, and talk of a format flip soon intensified.

=== Sports talk (2011–2021) ===
After an 18th-place finish in the ratings, the widely rumored change to sports radio was executed. At 3:00 pm on January 26, 2011, Citadel Broadcasting began simulcasting 1350 KTIK on 93.1, and imaged itself as "93.1 The Ticket". Longtime DJ Matt "MJ" Johnson announced a Super Bowl contest, and played "Bye Bye Bye" by NSync as the final song on 93.1 Hit Music Now. The new format debuted with "Idaho Sports Talk" with Jeff Caves and Mike Prater, who interviewed Johnson.

Minor league sports broadcasts such as the Boise Hawks and the Idaho Steelheads would not be heard on the FM frequency; instead it would broadcast either ESPN Radio or Westwood One programming. On February 2, 2011, the call letters changed to KTIK-FM. Citadel merged with Cumulus Media on September 16, 2011.

In late 2012, Cumulus Media announced that it would drop ESPN Radio from 47 of its stations nationwide. KTIK-AM-FM affiliated with the newly launched CBS Sports Radio. The move officially took effect on January 2, 2013.

=== News/talk (2021–present) ===
On November 26, 2021, Cumulus Media announced that the station would drop its simulcast with 1350 AM on January 3, 2022. A new translator, K237HA 95.3 in Nampa, would become the new FM home for KTIK's programming.

The 93.1 frequency then changed its call letters from KTIK-FM to KBOI-FM. The FM station began simulcasting news/talk-formatted KBOI (670 AM).

== Programming ==
Mike Kasper, Chris Walton and Rick Worthington host KBOI's morning show, while program director Nate Shelman hosts the afternoon show. The remainder of the schedule is nationally syndicated conservative talk shows.

The stations broadcast NFL football as an affiliate of the Seattle Seahawks radio network.
