= KTSY =

Radio station in Caldwell, Idaho

- Caldwell, Idaho; United States
- Broadcast area: Boise, Idaho
- Frequency: 89.5 MHz
- Branding: 89.5 KTSY

Programming
- Format: Contemporary Christian (Christmas music in Nov-Dec)

Ownership
- Owner: Idaho Conference of the Seventh-day Adventist Church
- Sister stations: KOAY

History
- First air date: October 14, 1990

Technical information
- Licensing authority: FCC
- Facility ID: 23459
- Class: C1
- ERP: 8,300 watts
- HAAT: 791 meters
- Transmitter coordinates: 43°45′18″N 116°5′52″W
- Repeater: See below

Links
- Public license information: Public file; LMS
- Webcast: Listen Live
- Website: 895ktsy.org

KTSY (89.5 FM) is a radio station broadcasting a Contemporary Christian format. Licensed to Caldwell, Idaho, United States, the station serves the Boise area. The station is currently owned by the Idaho Conference of the Seventh-day Adventist Church.

== Repeaters ==
KTSY is also carried on full-power stations in Baker City (KESY on 91.9 MHz) and McCall (KGSY on 88.3 MHz).
