= KSPD =

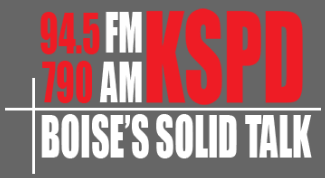
- Boise, Idaho; United States
- Broadcast area: Boise metropolitan area
- Frequency: 790 kHz
- Branding: 94.5 FM and 790 AM KSPD

Programming
- Format: Christian radio

Ownership
- Owner: Inspirational Family Radio, Inc.
- Sister stations: KBXL

History
- First air date: April 27, 1961
- Former call signs: KEST (1961–1970)
- Call sign meaning: "Spud"

Technical information
- Licensing authority: FCC
- Facility ID: 35627
- Class: D
- Power: 1,000 watts (day); 61 watts (night)
- Transmitter coordinates: 43°33′56.6″N 116°20′16.4″W
- Translator: 94.5 K233DE (Boise)

Links
- Public license information: Public file; LMS
- Webcast: Listen live
- Website: 790kspd.com

KSPD (790 AM) is a commercial radio station licensed to Boise, Idaho, United States, and broadcasting a Christian radio format for the Boise metropolitan area. The station is owned by Inspirational Family Radio. The studios are on South Weideman Avenue in Boise.

KSPD programming is also heard on 250-watt FM translator K233DE at 94.5 MHz.

== History ==
The station signed on the air on April 27, 1961. It originally held the call sign KEST. In 1970, the station's call sign was changed to KSPD, representing the word spud, slang for potato, one of Idaho's major agricultural products. KSPD adopted a progressive rock format.

By 1975, the station had adopted an all news format, which it continued to air into the 1980s. By 1989, the station had changed to a Christian radio format. In 2017, KSPD added an FM translator at 94.5 for listeners who prefer to tune in to FM stations.
