= KBXL =

- Caldwell, Idaho; United States
- Broadcast area: Boise metropolitan area
- Frequency: 94.1 MHz
- Branding: Faith Radio

Programming
- Format: Christian talk and teaching

Ownership
- Owner: Inspirational Family Radio, Inc. (sale to Northwestern Media pending)
- Sister stations: KSPD

History
- First air date: February 22, 1961 (as KBGN-FM)
- Former call signs: KBGN-FM (1961–1970)
- Call sign meaning: "Boise Excellent Listening"

Technical information
- Licensing authority: FCC
- Facility ID: 35628
- Class: C
- ERP: 40,000 watts
- HAAT: 803 meters (2,635 ft)
- Transmitter coordinates: 43°45′18″N 116°5′52″W

Links
- Public license information: Public file; LMS
- Webcast: Listen live
- Website: myfaithradio.com

KBXL (94.1 FM) is a radio station broadcasting a Christian talk and teaching format. Licensed to Caldwell, Idaho, United States, the station serves the Boise metropolitan area, and is currently owned by Inspirational Family Radio.

== History ==
The station began broadcasting February 22, 1961, and held the call sign KBGN-FM, simulcasting AM 910 KBGN. In 1970, the station's call sign was changed to KBXL. KBXL aired an easy listening format in the 1970s, 1980s, and early 1990s. In October 1991, the station adopted a soft AC format, and was branded "X-94". By 1994, the station had adopted a religious format.

In May 2025, Inspirational Family Radio filed to sell KBXL to the University of Northwestern – St. Paul, owner of the Northwestern Media network of Christian radio stations, for $1.5 million. The switch to Faith Radio took place on August 29, 2025.
