= KQXR =

Radio station in Payette, Idaho

Coordinates: 43.825°N 116.509°W

Payette, Idaho; United States
- Broadcast area: Boise metropolitan area
- Frequency: 100.3 MHz (HD Radio)
- Branding: 100.3 The X

Programming
- Format: Active rock

Ownership
- Owner: Lotus Communications; (Lotus Boise Corp.)
- Sister stations: KJOT, KRVB, KTHI

History
- First air date: December 1, 1978
- Former call signs: KWBJ (1978–1984); KQPD (1984–1990)
- Former frequencies: 100.1 MHz (1978–1992)
- Call sign meaning: "X Rock"

Technical information
- Licensing authority: FCC
- Facility ID: 42650
- Class: C1
- ERP: 100,000 watts
- HAAT: 216 meters (709 ft)
- Repeater: 94.9 KRVB-HD2 (Nampa)

Links
- Public license information: Public file; LMS
- Webcast: Listen live
- Website: xrock.com

KQXR (100.3 FM) is a commercial radio station licensed to Payette, Idaho, United States, and serving the Boise metropolitan area. It airs an active rock format and is owned by Lotus Communications. The studios and offices are on Fairview Avenue in downtown Boise. It uses the slogan "100.3 The X...Rocks."

KQXR's transmitter is sited off Idaho State Highway 16 in Emmett.

== History ==
The station signed on the air on December 1, 1978. The original call sign was KWBJ, owned by Blue Mountain Broadcasting. It broadcast on 100.1 MHz and was powered at 3,000 watts, a fraction of its current output. KWBJ was co-owned with 1450 KYET, now dark, with both stations simulcasting in the late 1970s and early 80s.

KWBJ broke away from the simulcast. It began to run an oldies format that was largely automated.

The station had an album rock-leaning Top 40 format, branded as Power 100. After being heard only in Ontario and Payette, KWBJ got a big increase in power. It began broadcasting at 98,000 watts, with the signal reaching most of the Treasure Valley including Parma, Caldwell, Nampa, and most parts of Ada County. In 1992, KQXR moved one notch up the FM dial, to the present frequency following a realignment.

In 1993, KQXR picked up a hard rock format branded as Pirate Radio 100.3. It was modeled after Pirate Radio in Los Angeles, now KKLQ.

KQXR flipped to alternative rock and rebranded as "100.3 The X" on August 25, 1995. The X started out playing alternative rock. however the music overlapped with co-owned J-105 (KJOT). KQXR was a finalist for Radio and Records magazine's 2007 Industry Achievement Award for "Best Alternative Station for markets 100 and Up." Other finalists include WKZQ-FM, WJSE, WBTZ, KXNA, and WSFM.

The station shifted to an active rock format in 2010. The station won the "Small Market Radio Station of the Year" at the RadioContraband Rock Radio Convention in 2017.

Journal Communications and the E. W. Scripps Company announced on July 30, 2014, that the two companies would merge to create a new broadcast company under the E. W. Scripps Company name that will own the two companies' broadcast properties, including KQXR. The transaction is slated to be completed in 2015, pending shareholder and regulatory approvals.

In January 2018, Scripps announced that it would sell all of its radio stations. In August 2018, Lotus Communications announced that it would acquire Scripps' Boise & Tucson clusters for $8 million. The sale was completed on December 12.
