= Iliad Media Group =

Idaho-based media company

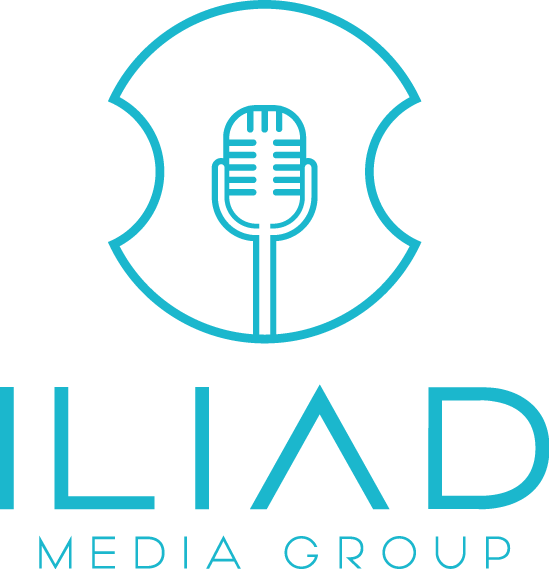
- Formerly: Impact Radio Group
- Industry: Radio, media, digital media, advertising
- Founded: December 31, 1998
- Founder: Wendell Starke
- Headquarters: Nampa, Idaho, United States
- Number of locations: 2
- Area served: Boise, Idaho metropolitan area & Twin Falls, Idaho metropolitan area
- Website: https://www.iliadmediagroup.com/

Iliad Media Group (formerly Impact Radio Group) is a media company and radio station owner based in Nampa, Idaho, with additional offices and stations in Twin Falls, Idaho. In addition to regularly having top-rated stations across the Boise metropolitan area and the Twin Falls metropolitan area, it is known as one of only four radio companies in the United States to be 100% employee-owned.

== History ==
=== As Impact Radio Group ===
As chairman of the investment firm Invesco, Wendell Starke began acquiring radio stations in the early 2000s. In 2007, with the acquisition of the station currently home to Wild 101 (KWYD), and 96.1 Bob FM (KSRV) as its anchor station, Impact Radio Group was formed.

Current CEO Darrell Calton joined the company in 2008 and began reorganizing stations. What began as a small group of stations with average ratings evolved into a collection of eight different formats, including market-leading stations 101.9 The Bull, 96.1 Bob FM, and My 102.7.

=== As Iliad Media Group ===
In January 2018, Impact Radio Group announced it would be known as Iliad Media Group. Additionally, it announced the acquisition of Locally Owned Radio, which operated six stations in the Twin Falls market. This brought the total number of Iliad Media Group stations to 13 across the two markets.

In 2021, Iliad Media Group launched the audio application Listen Boise, expanding its reach beyond traditional AM/FM radio. On October 7, 2021, Fox Sports Boise was launched on 99.9 FM, as a subchannel of KSRV-FM. This gave Iliad Media Group the 14 total stations across the Boise and Twin Falls markets they hold today, with five of them broadcasting on subchannels.

In 2023, Mentoring and Inspiring Women in Radio (MIW) named Iliad Media Group Senior Sales & Marketing Executive Mary Zukin as its first Speak Up! Mentee. The one-year program is designed for one mentee working in a small-to-medium market anywhere in the United States.

In October 2023, Iliad Media Group was named a "Top Workplace" for the Treasure Valley by The Idaho Press, as voted on by its employees.

=== Transition to Employee-Ownership ===
In September 2022, through an Employee Stock Ownership Plan, Wendell Starke sold Iliad Media Group to its 46 employees. This made the company one of only four radio groups in the United States to be 100% employee-owned. Additionally, they are the only radio company in the Boise market that is based in the region.

== Stations and Formats ==
Boise

KQBL | 101.9 FM The Bull, Country

KQBL-HD2 | 99.1 I-Rock, Active Rock

KQBL-HD3 | 96.5 The Alternative, Alternative Rock

KSRV | 96.1 Bob FM, Adult Hits form the '80s, '90s, and 2000s

KSRV-HD2 | 99.9 Fox Sports Boise, Sports Talk

KWYD | Wild 101.1 FM, Rhythmic CHR

KZMG | My 102.7, Hot Adult Contemporary

Twin Falls

KIKX | 104.7 Bob FM, Adult Variety

KIRQ | Q106.7 FM, Hot Adult Contemporary

KTPZ | Music Monster 92.7 FM, Top 40

KYUN | 102.1 FM The Bull, Country

KYUN-HD2 | I-Rock 105.1 FM, Active Rock

KYUN-HD3 | Magic 95.1 FM, Oldies
