= KARO =

Air 1 radio station in Nyssa, Oregon

- Nyssa, Oregon; United States
- Broadcast area: Boise, Idaho
- Frequency: 98.7 MHz
- Branding: Air1

Programming
- Format: Christian worship
- Affiliations: Air1

Ownership
- Owner: Educational Media Foundation
- Sister stations: KLXI

History
- First air date: 1997 (as KGZH)
- Former call signs: KGZH (1990–2003)
- Call sign meaning: AiR One

Technical information
- Licensing authority: FCC
- Facility ID: 57066
- Class: C0
- ERP: 11,500 watts
- HAAT: 805 meters
- Transmitter coordinates: 43°24′09″N 116°54′09″W

Links
- Public license information: Public file; LMS
- Webcast: Listen Live
- Website: air1.com

KARO (98.7 FM, "Air1") is a radio station licensed to serve Nyssa, Oregon, United States. The station is owned by the Educational Media Foundation.

It broadcasts a Christian worship music format as part of the Air1 network.

== History ==
This station received its original construction permit for a new 3,000 watt radio station broadcasting at 98.7 MHz from the Federal Communications Commission on December 5, 1989. The new station was assigned the call letters KGZH by the FCC on February 21, 1990. After a series of delays, extensions, a shift in transmitter site, and an upgrade in authorized power, KGZH finally received its license to cover as a 100,000 watt radio station from the FCC on April 23, 1998.

In June 1998, Mason Broadcasting, Inc., reached an agreement to sell this station to First Western Inc. for a reported sale price of $49,400. The deal was approved by the FCC on July 23, 1998, and the transaction was consummated on August 5, 1998.

In January 2003, First Western Inc. (G.W. Gilbert, president/director) reached an agreement to sell this station to the Educational Media Foundation (Richard Jenkins, president) for a reported sale price of $1 million. The deal was approved by the FCC on February 25, 2003, and the transaction was consummated on March 19, 2003. At the time of the sale, KGZH aired a country music format. The new owners had the FCC change the station's call letters to the current KARO on March 27, 2003.
