= KTIK (AM) =

Radio station in Boise, Idaho

Coordinates: 43°32′58″N 116°24′38″W

- Nampa, Idaho; United States
- Broadcast area: Boise metropolitan area
- Frequency: 1350 kHz
- Branding: 95.3 The Ticket

Programming
- Format: Sports
- Affiliations: Infinity Sports Network; Idaho Steelheads; NFL on Westwood One Sports

Ownership
- Owner: Cumulus Media; (Radio License Holding CBC, LLC)
- Sister stations: KBOI, KBOI-FM, KIZN, KKGL, KQFC

History
- First air date: November 1, 1962 (as KAIN at 1340)
- Former call signs: KAIN (1961–1981); KXTC (1981–1984); KNPA (1984–1986); KSGR (1986–1991); KANR (1991–1994)
- Former frequencies: 1340 kHz (1962–2000)
- Call sign meaning: "Ticket"

Technical information
- Licensing authority: FCC
- Facility ID: 16854
- Class: B
- Power: 5,000 watts day 600 watts night
- Translator: 95.3 K237HA (Nampa)

Links
- Public license information: Public file; LMS
- Webcast: Listen live; Listen live; Listen live (via iHeartRadio)
- Website: ktik.com

KTIK (1350 kHz, "95.3 The Ticket") is a commercial AM radio station located in Boise, Idaho, United States. KTIK airs sports talk programming as a Infinity Sports Network affiliate and is under ownership of Cumulus Media.

On January 26, 2011, KTIK began simulcasting on KZMG 93.1 FM, which was subsequently renamed KTIK-FM.

On January 3, 2022, KTIK rebranded as "95.3 The Ticket" after KTIK-FM switched to a simulcast of news/talk-formatted KBOI 670 AM.

== Previous logo ==
(KTIK's logo under previous simulcast with KTIK-FM 93.1)
