= KIZN =

Coordinates: 43.756°N 116.099°W

- Boise, Idaho; United States
- Broadcast area: Boise metropolitan area
- Frequency: 92.3 MHz
- Branding: Kissin 92.3

Programming
- Format: Country
- Affiliations: Westwood One

Ownership
- Owner: Cumulus Media; (Radio License Holding CBC, LLC)
- Sister stations: KBOI, KBOI-FM, KKGL, KQFC, KTIK

History
- First air date: December 1967 (as KATN-FM)
- Former call signs: KATN-FM (1967–1968); KBBK (1968–1975); KBBK-FM (1975–1984); KIYS (1984–1990)
- Call sign meaning: Sounds like Kissin (station branding)

Technical information
- Licensing authority: FCC
- Facility ID: 70626
- Class: C
- ERP: 48,000 watts
- HAAT: 828 meters

Links
- Public license information: Public file; LMS
- Webcast: Listen live; Listen live; Listen live (via iHeartRadio)
- Website: kizn.com

KIZN (92.3 FM) is a commercial radio station located in Boise, Idaho. KIZN airs a country music format branded as Kissin 92.3.

== History ==
=== Early years (1967–1978) ===
The station was launched in December 1967 as KATN-FM. On August 1, 1968, the callsign was changed to KBBK.

=== Top 40 (1978–1990) ===
On January 2, 1978, KBBK flipped to a new Top 40 format branded as Magic 92, one of the first full-time FM Top 40 stations in the Boise market. In 1984, KBBK changed their call letters to KIYS and rebranded as 92 Kiss FM. Throughout 1985, the station adopted a more album oriented rock-leaning format after the former full-time AOR station KIDQ (now KAWO) switched to Adult Contemporary before KJOT switched from country to its full-time AOR in late 1985.

=== Country (1990–present) ===
In 1990, the station switched to a Country format as Kissin' 92 as country music had become the most popular radio format in the United States, and changed the call letters to KIZN. The switch left Boise with just one CHR station (KF95) until KZMG re-launched as Magic 93.1 in 1991. KZMG had previously been Magic 93 with a short-lived Adult Contemporary format.

Previous logo

In early 2013, along with branding changes at sister station KQFC, Cumulus adjusted the name of the station from Kissin' 92 to KISSIN 92.3.

On April 3, 2017, a staff shuffle happened between KIZN and sister station KQFC; KQFC afternoon host Rick Daniels over to KIZN for the same shift. Also, KIZN debuted a new logo.

On October 1, 2017, Shawnda McNeal was hired to join market veteran Cory Mikhals on the KIZN morning shift. The morning show was rebranded as "Idaho's Morning Show".
