= KIDO =

Radio station in Nampa–Boise, Idaho

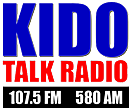
- Nampa, Idaho; United States
- Broadcast area: Boise metropolitan area
- Frequency: 580 kHz
- Branding: KIDO Talk Radio 107.5 FM 580 AM

Programming
- Format: Talk radio
- Affiliations: Fox News Radio; Compass Media Networks; Premiere Networks

Ownership
- Owner: Townsquare Media; (Townsquare License, LLC)
- Sister stations: KAWO; KCIX; KFXD; KSAS-FM; KXLT-FM

History
- First air date: 1925; 101 years ago
- Former call signs: KFXD (1925–1998); KBKK (1998); KFXD (1998–2002)
- Former frequencies: 1460 kHz (1925–1927); 1470 kHz (1927–1928); 1420 kHz (1928–1932); 1200 kHz (1932–1941); 1230 kHz (1941–1947)
- Call sign meaning: Idaho

Technical information
- Licensing authority: FCC
- Facility ID: 17396
- Class: B
- Power: 20,000 watts day 4,400 watts night
- Transmitter coordinates: 43°33′34.59″N 116°24′5.45″W
- Translator: 107.5 K298CN (Boise)

Links
- Public license information: Public file; LMS
- Webcast: Listen live
- Website: kidotalkradio.com

KIDO (580 AM) is a commercial radio station, owned and operated by Townsquare Media, which broadcasts a news/talk format. Licensed to Nampa, Idaho, it serves the Boise metropolitan area.

KIDO's studios are located at 827 East Park Blvd. in Boise, in the same building as co-owned 630 KFXD, 103.3 KSAS-FM, 104.3 KAWO, 105.9 KCIX, and 107.9 KXLT-FM. The transmitter site is on West Amity Road in Meridian, Idaho. KIDO operates with 20,000 watts by day using a non-directional antenna. But at night, to protect other stations on 580 kHz, KIDO reduces power to 4,400 watts and broadcasts a directional signal.

== Programming ==
KIDO has a local wake up program, Kevin Miller in The Morning featuring local news and interviews. Nationally syndicated talk shows are carried the rest of the day, including Glenn Beck, Dave Ramsey, Sean Hannity, Lars Larson, Ground Zero with Clyde Lewis, and Coast to Coast AM with George Noory.

Weekends feature shows on money, real estate, gardening, firearms, farming and ranching. Computer expert Kim Komando and Somewhere in Time with Art Bell are heard. Some weekday shows are repeated and paid brokered programming also airs.

== History ==
KIDO's first license was granted on September 2, 1925, with the sequentially assigned call letters of KFXD, to L. H. Strong (Packard Motor Co.) in Logan, Utah, transmitting on 1460 kHz. In early 1926, station ownership was transferred to the Service Radio Corporation, still in Logan. In early 1927 KFXD's license was allowed to lapse, but a few months it was relicensed to Service Radio, although now located in Jerome, Idaho, and broadcasting on 1470 kHz.

KFXD moved to its current location of Nampa, Idaho, in mid-1930.

For three weeks in February 1998 the call letters were changed to KBKK, before returning to KFXD.

=== 2002 KIDO / KFXD call letter swap ===
On August 14, 2002, stations KIDO and KFXD exchanged call signs, with AM 580 becoming KIDO, and AM 630 becoming KFXD. With this change, 580 inherited the legacy of the oldest surviving station in Idaho. The KIDO intellectual unit signed on in 1922 as KFAU, becoming KIDO in 1928.

For the general listening public, this resulted in the two familiar call signs appearing on new dial positions. The move was made so KIDO's news and talk programming could air on 580. While both stations operate at 5,000 watts, 580's location near the bottom of the AM dial allows its signal to travel farther. Additionally, while 580 operates at 5,000 watts around the clock, 630 had long been required to reduce power to an all-but-unlistenable 37 watts at night in order to protect several stations on adjacent channels. However, the FCC generally traces station identities by individual facilities rather than call signs. In this case, the "new" KIDO operates under the same license as the "old" KFXD.

On November 16, 2006, Clear Channel Communications planned to sell 448 of its radio stations outside the top 100 markets including KIDO, along with Boise sister stations KSAS-FM, KCIX, KTMY (now KAWO), KXLT-FM and KFXD. In March 2007, Peak Broadcasting LLC bought the Boise stations.

For 2011, KIDO announced it would become an affiliate for the BYU Cougars Sports Network.

On August 30, 2013, it was announced that Townsquare Media would purchase Peak Broadcasting's stations, including KIDO. The transaction was part of Cumulus Media's acquisition of Dial Global; Townsquare concurrently swapped Peak's stations in Fresno, California, to Cumulus for its stations in Dubuque, Iowa, and Poughkeepsie, New York. Peak, Townsquare, and Dial Global were all controlled by Oaktree Capital Management. The sale to Townsquare was completed on November 14, 2013.
