= KZMG =

- Melba, Idaho; United States
- Broadcast area: Boise, Idaho
- Frequency: 102.7 MHz (HD Radio)
- Branding: My 102.7 FM

Programming
- Format: Hot adult contemporary
- Subchannels: HD2: Oldies (KKOO simulcast); HD3: Regional Mexican (KDBI-FM simulcast)

Ownership
- Owner: Iliad Media Group Holdings Employee Stock Ownership Trust; (Iliad Media Group Holdings Inc.)
- Sister stations: KIKX, KIRQ, KKOO, KQBL, KSRV-FM, KTPZ, KWYD, KYUN, KSRV-HD2

History
- First air date: December 9, 2013
- Former call signs: KPHD (2006–2013)

Technical information
- Licensing authority: FCC
- Facility ID: 164141
- Class: C
- ERP: 50,000 watts
- HAAT: 803 meters (2,635 ft)
- Transmitter coordinates: 43°45′18.00″N 116°05′51.00″W
- Translator: HD2: 101.5 K268CU (Boise)

Links
- Public license information: Public file; LMS
- Webcast: Listen Live
- Website: my1027fm.com

KZMG (102.7 FM) is a commercial radio station licensed to Melba, Idaho, that serves the Boise metropolitan area. The station is currently owned by Iliad Media Group Holdings Employee Stock Ownership Trust, through licensee Iliad Media Group Holdings Inc. Known as My 102.7, it broadcasts a hot adult contemporary format and is home to Boise's #1 morning show, Joey & Lauren.

KZMG broadcasts in HD Radio. The studios and offices are on East Franklin Road in Nampa, Idaho.

== History ==
The KZMG call sign belonged to a top 40 radio station that later became KTIK-FM. KZMG's present frequency was originally owned by College Creek Media, LLC. The principal person in interest for College Creek Media was Christopher F Devine. In late 2011, ownership was transferred to Twin Peaks Radio, LLC, whose principal person in interest is Dale A. Ganske. Twin Peaks Radio, LLC and Northern Nevada Media, LLC (Principal person in interest Fred Weinberg) applied to the FCC to transfer the license, which the FCC approved, but the sale was never consummated.

On October 24, 2012, the sale of the then-KPHD to Lisa Kirkman's KPHD Radio, LLC was consummated at a purchase price of $35,000. On February 20, 2013, a further sale of the station by KPHD Radio to Kevin Terry's JLD Media, LLC was consummated at a purchase price of $90,000.

At some point, an application was filed with the Federal Communications Commission to move the then silent KPHD from Elko, NV on 97.5 to Melba, ID at 102.7. That permit was conditioned on several other stations changing their facilities. On October 31, 2013, at 5 PM, KSAS-FM Caldwell, ID moved from 103.3 to 103.5, and KZNO Jerome, ID moved from 102.9 to 103.1 to make room for the new station. On November 11, 2013, the station changed its call sign from KPHD to the current KZMG. On December 9, 2013, the station signed on as "My 102.7 FM", broadcasting a hot adult contemporary format.

On February 21, 2014, JLD Media sold KZMG to FM Idaho CO., LLC at a purchase price of $800,000.

== My 102.7 ==
My 102.7 often features high-profile contests, with only local participants permitted to win. It also frequently serves as a reliable community resource.

The current weekday lineup of My 102.7 consists of Joey & Lauren in the Morning from 6 A.M. to 10 A.M., Middays with Meredith from 10 A.M. to 3 P.M., and Afternoons with Melissa Paul from 3 P.M. to 7 P.M.

Joey & Lauren in the Morning was rated the #1 morning show in the Treasure Valley for each of Nielsen's 2022 ratings releases.
