= KOAY (FM) =

- Middleton, Idaho; United States
- Frequency: 88.7 MHz
- Branding: Project 88.7

Programming
- Language: English
- Format: Christian contemporary hit radio

Ownership
- Owner: Idaho Conference of Seventh-Day Adventists, Inc.
- Sister stations: KTSY

History
- Former call signs: KTYY (2007–2010)

Technical information
- Licensing authority: FCC
- Facility ID: 61307
- Class: C1
- ERP: 6,000 watts
- HAAT: 791 meters (2,595 ft)
- Transmitter coordinates: 43°45′18″N 116°05′52″W

Links
- Public license information: Public file; LMS
- Webcast: Listen Live
- Website: myprojectnation.com

KOAY (88.7 FM) is a radio station licensed to serve the community of Middleton, Idaho. The station is owned by the Idaho Conference of Seventh-Day Adventists, Inc. It airs a rhythmic leaning Christian CHR format.

The station was assigned the call sign KTYY by the Federal Communications Commission on September 24, 2007. The station changed its call sign to KOAY on April 9, 2010.
