= KJOT =

Coordinates: 43.755°N 116.099°W

Boise, Idaho; United States
- Broadcast area: Boise metropolitan area
- Frequency: 105.1 MHz
- Branding: 105.1 Jack FM

Programming
- Format: Adult hits
- Affiliations: Jack FM network

Ownership
- Owner: Lotus Communications; (Lotus Boise Corp.)
- Sister stations: KQXR, KRVB, KTHI

History
- First air date: 1979

Technical information
- Licensing authority: FCC
- Facility ID: 6329
- Class: C
- ERP: 53,000 watts
- HAAT: 789 meters (2,589 ft)

Links
- Public license information: Public file; LMS
- Webcast: Listen live
- Website: jackboise.com

KJOT (105.1 FM) is a commercial radio station in Boise, Idaho. It is owned by Lotus Communications and carries an adult hits radio format known as Jack FM. KJOT plays a wide variety of hits from the 1960s until today, concentrating mostly on rock songs from the 1980s and 1990s. The radio studios and offices are on Fairview Avenue in Boise.

KJOT has an effective radiated power (ERP) of 53,000 watts. The transmitter is in Horseshoe Bend, amid the towers for other Boise-area FM and TV stations.

KJOT's FCC (Federal Communications Commission) license was granted on February 12 2020 and will expire on October 01 2029.

== History ==
=== Country (1979–1985) ===
KJOT first signed on in 1979 as a country music station.

=== Rock (1985–2021) ===
In 1985, the station switched to an album-oriented rock format and rebranded as "J105" after KUUB (now KAWO) dropped the format that same year. KJOT became a classic rock station around 2003 branded as "J105: Classic Rock, That Rocks". In 2006, the station changed the slogan to "J105: Everything That Rocks".

At midnight on May 14, 2010, KJOT became a mainstream rock station branded as "Variety Rock 105.1". On November 12, 2012, KJOT began stunting with Christmas music, with a new format planned when the holiday songs ended. After Christmas, KJOT returned to classic rock, still using the "Variety Rock" branding.

=== New ownership ===
Journal Communications (KJOT's owner) and E. W. Scripps Company announced on July 30, 2014, that the two companies would merge to create a new broadcast company under the E. W. Scripps Company name that will own the two companies' broadcast properties, including KJOT. The transaction was completed in 2015.

On March 27, 2017, KJOT returned to its former "J105" branding.

In January 2018, Scripps announced that it would sell all of its radio stations. In August 2018, Lotus Communications announced that it would acquire Scripps' Boise & Tucson clusters for $8 million. The sale was completed on December 12.

=== Adult hits (2021–present) ===
On March 13, 2021, Lotus Communications announced KJOT would drop its rock format after 35 years and flip to adult hits, as "105-1 Jack FM" on March 15. The change took place at midnight. The last song on J105 was "Knockin' on Heaven's Door" by Guns N' Roses, while the first song on Jack FM was "One Week" by Barenaked Ladies.

The Jack FM format is syndicated across the U.S. and Canada, and is aired in cities such as Los Angeles, Dallas and Vancouver. KJOT's format is in competition with KSRV-FM ("Bob FM 96-1"), a different brand of Adult Hits.

== In popular culture ==
In the 1988 comedy film Moving, the radio station J-105 was briefly heard when the Pear family arrived to Boise.
