= KQFC =

Coordinates: 43.756°N 116.099°W

- Boise, Idaho; United States
- Broadcast area: Boise metropolitan area
- Frequency: 97.9 MHz
- Branding: Magic 97.9 fm

Programming
- Format: Soft AC

Ownership
- Owner: Cumulus Media; (Radio License Holding CBC, LLC)
- Sister stations: KBOI, KBOI-FM, KIZN, KKGL, KTIK

History
- First air date: November 1, 1960
- Former call signs: KBOI-FM (1960–1985)

Technical information
- Licensing authority: FCC
- Facility ID: 51217
- Class: C
- ERP: 48,000 watts
- HAAT: 828 meters (2,717 ft)

Links
- Public license information: Public file; LMS
- Webcast: Listen live; Listen live; Listen live (via iHeartRadio)
- Website: magic979boise.com

KQFC (97.9 FM, "Magic 97.9") is a commercial radio station licensed to Boise, Idaho, United States. It airs a soft adult contemporary format and is owned by Cumulus Media. Studios are on West Bannock Street in Boise. The transmitter is off North Bogus Basin Road, north of Boise.

== History ==
=== KBOI-FM (1960–1985) ===
On November 1, 1960, the station signed on the air as KBOI-FM. It was the FM counterpart to KBOI, owned by Boise Valley Broadcasters. The company was a subsidiary of the Church of Jesus Christ of Latter-day Saints.

At first, KBOI-FM mostly simulcast the full service, middle of the road format on KBOI, consisting of popular music, news and sports. By the late 1960s, KBOI-FM broke away with its own beautiful music format. It played quarter hour sweeps of mostly instrumental cover versions of popular songs, as well as Broadway and Hollywood show tunes. KBOI-TV was also co-owned with KBOI-AM-FM, although the TV station today is owned by the Sinclair Broadcast Group.

=== Country (1986–2017) ===
On January 1, 1986, the station switched its call sign to KQFC, flipping to a country music format as 98 Country. Cory Mchals and Debi McCallister, longtime radio veterans, joined KQFC in August 2002 from the Monterey, California, radio market to host morning drive time. Other announcers include Spencer Burke (middays), Tommy Collins (PM drive), Scott Cruize (evenings), and Ron O'Brian (weekends).

In October 2011, Cumulus took over the ownership of Citadel's Boise operations, placing KQFC under the same ownership as KIZN, one of its country music rivals. The change in ownership meant cuts in KQFC's air staff, as McCallister and Burke were let go from their contracts as part of a reduction in workforce throughout the company. It was also speculated that with Cumulus having two Country outlets in Boise, either KIZN or KQFC would be poised for a possible format flip in the future.

On May 24, 2013, KQFC rebranded as Nash FM 97.9, using Cumulus' national branding for many of its country stations. In February 2014, the nationally syndicated America's Morning Show replaced the local Q Waking Crew with Cory Mchals after more than 10 years. Mikhals was relocated to co-owned KIZN.

=== Classic country (2017–2019) ===
On April 3, 2017, KQFC dropped the "Nash FM" branding and flipped to a classic country format as "97.9 KQFC." On April 3, 2017, Steve Shannon became the morning DJ after hosting afternoons on sister station KIZN.

=== Soft adult contemporary (2019–present) ===
On October 11, 2019, KQFC began simulcasting KIZN. Three days later, KQFC dropped its longtime country format and flipped to soft adult contemporary as "Magic 97.9". The Soft AC format had scored sizable ratings in San Francisco and Seattle, leading Cumulus to try it in Boise.
