= KXLT-FM =

Eagle, Idaho; United States
- Broadcast area: Boise metropolitan area
- Frequency: 107.9 MHz
- Branding: 107.9 Lite FM

Programming
- Format: Adult contemporary
- Affiliations: Premiere Networks

Ownership
- Owner: Townsquare Media; (Townsquare License, LLC)
- Sister stations: KAWO; KCIX; KFXD; KIDO; KSAS-FM

History
- First air date: September 1994
- Former call signs: KRVG (1992–1994, CP)
- Call sign meaning: "Lite"

Technical information
- Licensing authority: FCC
- Facility ID: 18049
- Class: C
- ERP: 45,000 watts
- HAAT: 818 meters (2,684 ft)
- Transmitter coordinates: 43°45′17.6″N 116°5′55.4″W

Links
- Public license information: Public file; LMS
- Webcast: Listen live
- Website: liteonline.com

KXLT-FM (107.9 MHz, "107.9 Lite FM") is a commercial radio station licensed to Eagle, Idaho, and serving the Boise metropolitan area. The station is owned by Townsquare Media with the license assigned to Townsquare License, LLC. It airs an adult contemporary radio format, switching to all Christmas music for much of November and December.

KXLT-FM has an effective radiated power (ERP) of 45,000 watts. The tower is 818 meters (2684 feet) in height above average terrain (HAAT), giving it excellent coverage over much of Western Idaho, as well as part of Oregon. The transmitter is off Shafer Butte Road in Horseshoe Bend, Idaho, among the towers for other Boise-area FM and TV stations.

== History ==
While the station was still doing testing, it was assigned the KXLT-FM call sign by the Federal Communications Commission on August 26, 1994. It signed on the air in September 1994, as “Lite 108”.

On November 16, 2006, Clear Channel Communications planned to sell 448 of its radio stations outside the top 100 markets, including the company's Boise stations: KXLT-FM, KSAS-FM, KCIX, KTMY (now KAWO), KIDO, and KFXD. In March 2007, Peak Broadcasting LLC bought the former Clear Channel-owned stations.

On August 30, 2013, a deal was announced in which Townsquare Media would purchase Peak Broadcasting's stations, including KXLT-FM. The deal was part of Cumulus Media's acquisition of Dial Global; Townsquare swapped Peak's stations in Fresno, California, to Cumulus for its stations in Dubuque, Iowa, and Poughkeepsie, New York. Peak, Townsquare, and Dial Global were all controlled by Oaktree Capital Management. The sale to Townsquare was completed on November 14, 2013.
