= KLXI =

K-Love radio station in Fruitland, Idaho

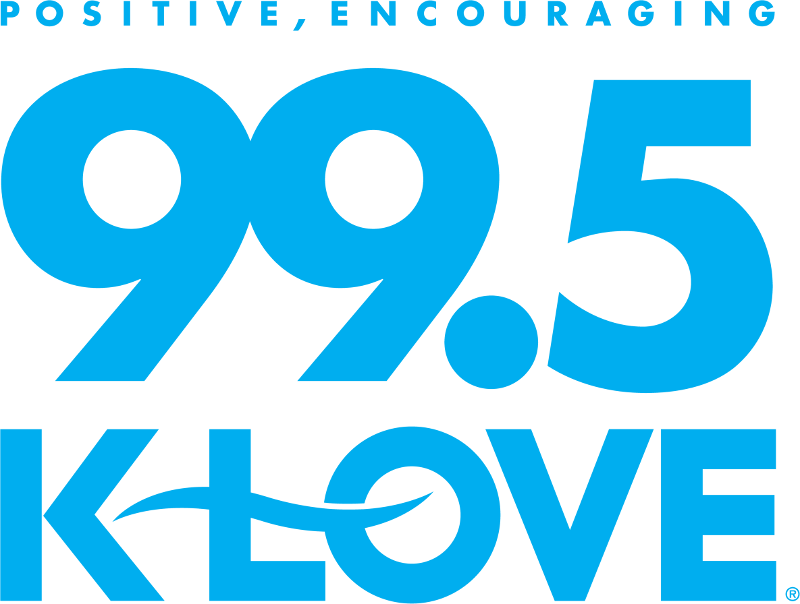
- Fruitland, Idaho; United States
- Broadcast area: Boise metropolitan area
- Frequency: 99.5 MHz

Programming
- Format: Contemporary Christian
- Network: K-Love

Ownership
- Owner: Educational Media Foundation
- Sister stations: KARO

History
- First air date: 1984
- Former call signs: KWEI-FM (1983–2011); KKOO (2011–2016)
- Former frequencies: 100.9 MHz (CP, 1983-1984)

Technical information
- Licensing authority: FCC
- Facility ID: 67612
- Class: C0
- ERP: 22,000 watts
- HAAT: 803 meters (2636 feet)
- Transmitter coordinates: 44°00′58″N 116°24′15″W

Links
- Public license information: Public file; LMS
- Webcast: Listen Live
- Website: klove.com

KLXI (99.5 FM) is an American radio station licensed to serve the community of Fruitland, Idaho. The station, which began broadcasting in 1984 as KWEI-FM, is owned by the Educational Media Foundation.

Until September 1, 2016, the station (as KKOO) broadcast an oldies music format to the greater Boise, Idaho, area. KKOO programming was derived in part from Dial Global Local's syndicated Good Time Oldies format.

== History ==
This station received its original construction permit for a new FM station broadcasting at 100.9 MHz with 3,000 watts of effective radiated power from the Federal Communications Commission on May 19, 1983. The new station was assigned the call letters KWEI-FM by the FCC on September 19, 1983. On June 29, 1984, the station was granted a new construction permit, this time for broadcasting at 99.5 MHz, this station's current frequency assignment.

In June 1984, Mountain Land Broadcasting reached an agreement to sell the permit for this still-under construction station to Summit Communications, Inc. The deal was approved by the FCC on August 13, 1984, and the transaction was consummated on September 4, 1984. KWEI-FM received its license to cover from the FCC on February 7, 1985.

In October 1985, Summit Communications, Inc., agreed to sell KWEI-FM to Love Radio Group, Inc. The deal was approved by the FCC on November 25, 1985, and the transaction was consummated on January 28, 1986. However, after the Love Radio Group fell into financial difficulty, the license was returned to Summit Communications, Inc. In May 1986, Summit Communications, Inc., again reached an agreement to sell this station, this time to Weiseradio, Inc. The deal was approved by the FCC on July 7, 1986, and the transaction was consummated on July 22, 1986.

In May 1987, Weiseradio, Inc., reached an agreement to sell this station to Treasure Valley Broadcasting Company. The deal was approved by the FCC on July 10, 1987, and the transaction was consummated the same day.

Radio Variedades logo

La Lay branding (2010)

Before taking on the "La Ley" branding, the station was marketed as "Radio Variedades" and aired a similar Spanish language music format.

On March 15, 2011, KWEI-FM changed their format to oldies under the KKOO call sign.

On May 12, 2016, Educational Media Foundation purchased KKOO and KWEI. Both stations became K-Love affiliates and sister stations to Air1 affiliate KARO. On August 18, 2016, the oldies format moved to K268CU 101.5 FM. EMF took control of both stations on September 1, 2016; that day, KKOO changed their call letters to KLXI and began stunting. On October 10, 2016, KLXI ended stunting and switched to EMF's "K-Love" contemporary Christian format.
