= KAWO =

- Boise, Idaho; United States
- Broadcast area: Boise metropolitan area
- Frequency: 104.3 MHz
- Branding: Wow Country 104.3

Programming
- Format: Country
- Affiliations: Compass Media Networks; Premiere Networks

Ownership
- Owner: Townsquare Media; (Townsquare License, LLC)
- Sister stations: KCIX, KFXD, KIDO, KSAS-FM, KXLT-FM

History
- First air date: July 15, 1979 (as KIDQ)
- Former call signs: KIDQ (1979–1985); KUUB (1985); KLTB (1985–2006); KTMY (2006–2007)
- Call sign meaning: K A WOw

Technical information
- Licensing authority: FCC
- Facility ID: 63916
- Class: C
- ERP: 52,000 watts
- HAAT: 786 meters
- Transmitter coordinates: 43°45′18″N 116°05′52″W

Links
- Public license information: Public file; LMS
- Webcast: Listen Live
- Website: 1043wowcountry.com

KAWO (104.3 FM, "Wow Country 104.3") is a commercial radio station located in Boise, Idaho. KAWO airs a country music format branded as "Wow Country 104.3". Until 2007, the station was called "My Country 104.3" and its call letters were KTMY.

== History ==
The station started operating on July 15, 1979, with the first Album-oriented rock station in the Boise market as Q-104 (KIDQ). In January 1985, the station was switched to an adult contemporary format with KUUB as the call letters branding as KWB FM 104. However, the call letters and the branding were short-lived and changed the call letters to KLTB with a new branding as K-Lite 104 FM in March that same year. The shift left Boise without an AOR station for nearly a year until KJOT (J-105) switched from country to AOR in late 1985. KLTB was switched to oldies as Kool 104 (later known as Kool Oldies 104.3) until January 2006 when then-owner Clear Channel Communications switched from oldies to a country format. The new format brought new call letters, KTMY, and new positioning as My Country 104.3.

On November 16, 2006, Clear Channel Communications planned to sell 448 of its radio stations outside the top 100 markets including KTMY, along with Boise's sister stations including KSAS-FM, KCIX, KXLT-FM, KIDO, and KFXD, making Boise the largest radio market in the United States for Clear Channel to sell the stations. In March 2007, Peak Broadcasting LLC bought the former Clear Channel-owned stations.

The station's ratings continued to decline, however, and in late May 2007 KTMY shed its "My Country" imaging to become "WOW Country 104.3". While this involved a change to the on-air talent lineup, imaging, nickname, jingle package, and call letters the station maintained a country music format. One notable programming feature of the station became 104-minute music sets, a nod to the station's broadcast frequency, which was abandoned upon Lisa Adams taking over the Programming duties.

On August 30, 2013, a deal was announced in which Townsquare Media would purchase Peak Broadcasting's stations, including KAWO. The deal was part of Cumulus Media's acquisition of Dial Global; Townsquare swapped Peak's Fresno, California stations to Cumulus for its stations in Dubuque, Iowa and Poughkeepsie, New York, and Peak, Townsquare, and Dial Global were all controlled by Oaktree Capital Management. The sale to Townsquare was completed on November 14, 2013.

== Previous logos ==
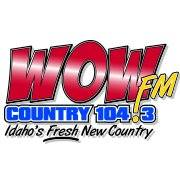
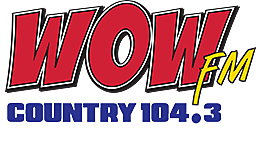
