= KTRP (AM) =

Radio station in Notus, Idaho

- Notus, Idaho; United States
- Broadcast area: Boise metropolitan area
- Frequency: 1450 kHz

Programming
- Language: Spanish
- Format: Christian

Ownership
- Owner: Centro Familiar Cristiano

History
- First air date: June 14, 1965; 61 years ago (as KYET)
- Former call signs: KYET (1965–1984); KACY (1984–1990); KIOV (1990–2011); KWEI (2011–2014)

Technical information
- Licensing authority: FCC
- Facility ID: 67613
- Class: C
- Power: 1,000 watts
- Transmitter coordinates: 44°14′0″N 116°57′18″W
- Translator: 103.1 K276GE (Notus)

Links
- Public license information: Public file; LMS

KTRP (1450 AM) is a radio station licensed to serve the community of Notus, Idaho, United States. The station is owned by Centro Familiar Cristiano. KTRP is silent as of April 20, 2016.

== History ==
The station went on the air June 14, 1965 as KYET. It changed its call sign to KACY on October 1, 1984. On January 30, 1990, the station changed its call sign to KIOV. The station took on the KWEI call sign on March 25, 2011; three years later, the station swapped call signs with 1260 AM and became KTRP.

Until April 20, 2016, KTRP broadcast a Tejano format to the greater Boise, Idaho, area and was the only full-time Tejano station in the state of Idaho. The station went off the air on April 20, 2016, following a transmitter failure.
