= KPDA (FM) =

Radio station in Mountain Home, Idaho

- Mountain Home, Idaho; United States
- Broadcast area: Boise metropolitan area
- Frequency: 100.7 MHz
- Branding: La Poderosa (The Power)

Programming
- Format: Regional Mexican

Ownership
- Owner: Kevin Terry; (Radio Rancho, LLC)
- Sister stations: KDBI-FM

History
- First air date: 1982; 44 years ago
- Former call signs: KQKZ (1980–1984); KJCY-FM (1984–1989); KLVJ-FM (1989–1997); KTPZ (1997–2007); KTPD (2007–2007); KTMB (2007–2008); KQLZ (2008–2011); KINF-FM (2011–2013); KPDA (2013–2014); KQBL (2014–2015)
- Former frequencies: 99.1 MHz (1982–2013)
- Call sign meaning: Poderosa

Technical information
- Licensing authority: FCC
- Facility ID: 72658
- Class: C
- ERP: 80,000 watts
- HAAT: 668 meters (2,192 ft)
- Transmitter coordinates: 43°14′43″N 115°26′12″W
- Translator: 92.7 K224EP (Boise)

Links
- Public license information: Public file; LMS
- Webcast: Listen live
- Website: www.lapoderosaidaho.com

KPDA (100.7 MHz, "La Poderosa") is a commercial radio station licensed to Mountain Home, Idaho, and serving the Boise metropolitan area. It airs a Regional Mexican format and is owned by Kevin Terry, through licensee Radio Rancho, LLC The studios and offices for KPDA and sister station 106.3 KDBI-FM are on East Franklin Road in Nampa.

== History ==
=== Early years ===
The station, originally on 99.1 MHz, first signed on in 1982. Its call sign was KQKZ and it broadcast a soft adult contemporary format. On November 1, 1984, the station changed its call letters to KJCY-FM to match that of its AM sister station (1240 AM, now KMHI), then to KLVJ-FM on June 1, 1989.

In August 1992, Media Venture Management Inc., headed by Randolph George, sold KLVJ-FM and its AM counterpart KLVJ to William Konopnicki for $78,000. Both stations were silent at the time of the sale. In April 1995, Konopnicki sold the combo to station manager Jack Jensen, doing business as Valley Mountain Broadcasting Inc., for $310,000; the FM station aired a country music format.

In November 1996, Jensen sold KLVJ-AM-FM to Wendell Starke's FM Idaho Company for $475,500. FM Idaho changed the FM station's call letters to KTPZ on January 7, 1997.

=== Contemporary hits ===
In October 2000, FM Idaho sold six stations, including contemporary hit radio outlet KTPZ, to Horizon Broadcasting Group LLC for $10 million. The station became KTPD on March 30, 2007, then KTMB on June 28, 2007.

In 2008, Impact Radio Group acquired KTMB and moved the KQLZ call sign to the 99.1 FM frequency from 100.7 FM. The pre-existing talk radio format on 99.1 flipped to oldies, featuring programing from ABC Radio Network's The True Oldies Channel. The KQLZ call letters previously resided at a station in Los Angeles which, like The True Oldies Channel, was programmed by Scott Shannon.)

=== Modern rock and talk ===
On September 4, 2009, at Noon, KQLZ ended three days of stunting with "Thriller" by Michael Jackson to become country music-formatted "99.1 The Bronco". The move came after the demise of True Oldies and the subsequent retirement of longtime Boise radio voice "Big" Jack Armstrong. However, the country format lasted only a few hours; that same day at 3:49 p.m., KQLZ flipped to modern rock as "99.1 The Virus". Questions arose about the new name as it shared that of an XM Satellite Radio talk channel, The Virus. However, the general manager of Impact Radio did not "consider it a problem". Since the original launch, the station dropped the Virus name and rebranded as "V99.1 FM".

On August 8, 2011, KQLZ flipped to a news/talk format as a simulcast of KINF (730 AM, now dark). A week later, on August 15, the station changed its call sign to KINF-FM. On January 1, 2013, the KINF simulcast ended with the AM station becoming an ESPN Radio affiliate; KINF-FM retained the news/talk format.

=== Regional Mexican ===
On November 26, 2013, KPDA swapped frequencies with KINF-FM, moving the former station's regional Mexican format known as "La Poderosa" from 99.1 to 100.7 FM. The 100.7 frequency adopted the KPDA call letters the following day. On February 12, 2014, the call sign changed again to KQBL; two days later, on February 14, the station changed its format to country, branded as "100.7 The Bull".

On February 11, 2015, KQBL reverted to the KPDA call sign; the next day, JLD Media, LLC consummated the purchase of KPDA from Impact Radio Group, at a purchase price of $200,000. KPDA restored the former "La Poderosa" regional Mexican format on March 1. On March 27, owner Kevin Terry transferred KPDA's license to Radio Rancho, LLC.
