= KCIX =

Coordinates: 43.755°N 116.099°W

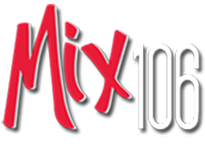
- Garden City, Idaho; United States
- Broadcast area: Boise metropolitan area
- Frequency: 105.9 MHz
- Branding: Mix 106

Programming
- Format: Adult Top 40
- Affiliations: Compass Media Networks

Ownership
- Owner: Townsquare Media; (Townsquare License, LLC)
- Sister stations: KAWO, KFXD, KIDO, KSAS-FM, KXLT-FM

History
- First air date: January 1, 1985

Technical information
- Licensing authority: FCC
- Facility ID: 13750
- Class: C
- ERP: 49,000 watts
- HAAT: 823 meters (2,700 ft)

Links
- Public license information: Public file; LMS
- Webcast: Listen Live
- Website: mix106radio.com

KCIX (105.9 FM, "Mix 106") is a commercial radio station located in Garden City, Idaho, broadcasting to the Boise, Idaho, area. KCIX airs an adult top 40 music format.

== Personalities ==
The station has cycled through more than a dozen morning show combinations since the departure of popular host Kate McGwire in 2016. Its ratings have plunged. Chris and Ryan in the Morning took over weekday morning duties (5AM-10AM) on the station in November 2022. The show features segments with listeners, local content, and lifestyle topics. The morning drive show is followed by middays with Deanna from 10AM to 2PM before Marco takes over in afternoon drive from 2PM to 7PM. At 7PM, Pop Crush Nights with Donny Meacham airs which features celebrity gossip and pop culture news. Lauryn Snapp hosts on the weekend. The station features traffic cut-ins shared with corporate sister stations, hosted by Dave Burnett and Robin Scott.

== History ==
KCIX signed on January 1, 1985, with an adult contemporary format branded as “K106”. Throughout the rest of the 1980s, the station competed with two future sister stations that previously broadcast AC formats, KLCI and KUUB (later KLTB). The former switched to easy listening in 1987 while the latter switched to oldies in 1990. In the late 90’s, the station moved in a Top 40 direction. In 1999, KCIX rebranded as “Mix 106” with Hot AC.

On November 16, 2006, Clear Channel Communications planned to sell 448 of its radio stations outside the top 100 markets including KCIX, along with Boise's sister stations including KSAS-FM, KTMY (now KAWO), KXLT-FM, KIDO, and KFXD. In March 2007, Peak Broadcasting LLC bought the former Clear Channel-owned stations.

In 2011, Mix 106 silently began adding more contemporary pop currents, moving the station in an Adult Top 40 direction.

On August 30, 2013, a deal was announced in which Townsquare Media would purchase Peak Broadcasting's stations, including KCIX. The deal was part of Cumulus Media's acquisition of Dial Global; Townsquare swapped Peak's stations in Fresno, California, to Cumulus for its stations in Dubuque, Iowa, and Poughkeepsie, New York. Peak, Townsquare, and Dial Global were all controlled by Oaktree Capital Management. The sale to Townsquare was completed on November 14, 2013.
