= KBOI (AM) =

Coordinates: 43°25′43.6″N 116°19′46.42″W

- Boise, Idaho; United States
- Broadcast area: Boise metropolitan area
- Frequency: 670 kHz
- Branding: News Talk KBOI

Programming
- Format: Talk radio
- Affiliations: ABC News Radio; Fox News Radio; Westwood One

Ownership
- Owner: Cumulus Media; (Radio License Holding CBC, LLC)
- Sister stations: KBOI-FM, KIZN, KKGL, KQFC, KTIK

History
- First air date: August 11, 1947
- Former call signs: KDSH (1947–1955)
- Former frequencies: 950 kHz (1947–1968)
- Call sign meaning: Boise

Technical information
- Licensing authority: FCC
- Facility ID: 51211
- Class: B
- Power: 50,000 watts
- Repeater: 93.1 KBOI-FM (New Plymouth)

Links
- Public license information: Public file; LMS
- Webcast: Listen live; Listen live; Listen live (via iHeartRadio)
- Website: www.kboi.com

KBOI (670 kHz) is a commercial AM radio station licensed to Boise, Idaho. Owned by Cumulus Media, KBOI simulcasts a talk format with KBOI-FM. Studios are on Bannock Street in Downtown Boise, while the transmitter site resides on Cloverdale Road in Kuna.

With a good radio, KBOI can be heard across much of the Western United States and Western Canada at night, and is strongest in the Pacific Northwest. Because of this, KBOI is Idaho's designated primary entry point station for the Emergency Alert System.

== History ==
=== KDSH ===
The station first signed on the air on August 11, 1947. The call sign was originally KDSH with the studios at 311 North 10th Street. It was owned by Boise Valley Broadcasters, a subsidiary of the Church of Jesus Christ of Latter-day Saints.

KDSH was originally on 950 kHz, powered at 5,000 watts. It was a CBS Radio Network affiliate for much of this period. In 1953, Boise Valley Broadcasters put a TV station on the air, Channel 2 KBOI. It was Boise's second TV station after KIDO-TV (channel 7).

=== KBOI ===
On February 11, 1955, the stations switched their call letters to KBOI and KBOI-TV. The change in call signs took place, along with the relocation of the television station's city of license from Meridian to Boise. An FM radio station was added in 1960, 97.9 KBOI-FM (now KQFC). For the first few years, the AM and FM stations simulcast their programming. As network programming moved from radio to television, KBOI-AM-FM switched to a full service, middle of the road (MOR) format of popular music, news and sports. In the late 1960s, KBOI-FM broke away from the simulcast and began playing beautiful music.

In the 1980s, as listeners switched from AM to FM for music listening, KBOI added more talk programming. It eventually completed the change over to all talk.

=== Cumulus Media ===
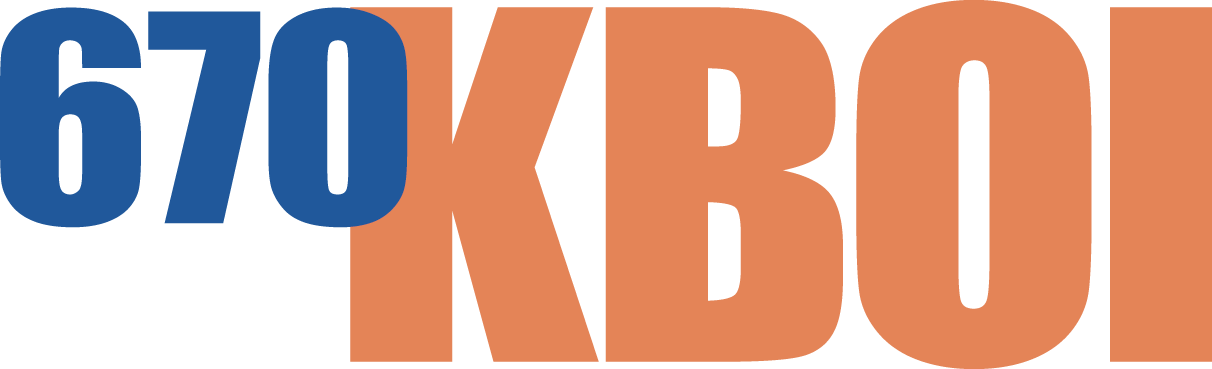
Logo before FM simulcast

In 2005, its owner at the time, Citadel Broadcasting, switched KBOI's affiliation to ABC's Information Network, in advance of Citadel's 2007 acquisition of ABC Radio. Citadel merged with Cumulus Media on September 16, 2011. At the beginning of 2015, Cumulus switched KBOI and most of its other news/talk stations from ABC News to Cumulus-owned Westwood One News. In 2020, Westwood One News was discontinued and KBOI returned to ABC News affiliation.

KBOI was the contracted radio station for Boise State University Broncos football and men's basketball from 1973 through early 2008, with Paul J. Schneider as play-by-play announcer. The Broncos returned to KBOI during the 2010 season with Bob Behler serving as the Voice of the Broncos.

=== FM simulcast ===
On January 3, 2022, KBOI began simulcasting on KTIK-FM (93.1), which concurrently took on the KBOI-FM call sign. KTIK-FM had previously simulcast the sports format of sister station KTIK.

=== Morning show ===
The KBOI morning show, "Idaho's First Morning News/Idaho Talks Live" was anchored by Paul J. Schneider and Chris Walton until December 2018, when Schneider retired from full-time broadcasting after 51 years with KBOI-TV and KBOI Radio. Schneider, an Illinois native who moved to Idaho as a teen with his parents and brother, was a KBOI Radio morning host from 1976 to 2018. Walton, a native of Twin Falls, joined the program in 2001, moving from the morning drive show at Citadel-owned classic rock station KKGL-FM.

Idaho native Mike Kasper, the former morning drive co-host of Boise station KCIX, was hired by KBOI following Schneider's retirement. Since January 2019, the KBOI wake up program has been known as "Kasper and Chris".

The radio morning show was simulcast on then-local Fox Television Network station KTRV-TV from 8am to 10am Monday through Friday from 2003 through 2010. KTRV dropped the program after Boise CBS affiliate television station KBCI-TV changed its call letters back to KBOI-TV in 2010 (after spending the last 35 years as KBCI-TV) to reflect a renewed partnership with KBOI radio.

== Programming ==
Mike Kasper, Chris Walton and Rick Worthington host KBOI's morning show, while program director Nate Shelman hosts the afternoon show. The remainder of the schedule is nationally syndicated conservative talk shows.

The stations broadcast NFL football as an affiliate of the Seattle Seahawks radio network.
