= KKOO (AM) =

Radio station in Weiser, Idaho

- Weiser, Idaho; United States
- Broadcast area: Boise metropolitan area
- Frequency: 1260 kHz
- Branding: 101.5 Kool FM

Programming
- Format: Oldies

Ownership
- Owner: Iliad Media Group Holdings Employee Stock Ownership Trust; (Iliad Media Group Holdings Inc.)
- Sister stations: KIKX, KIRQ, KQBL, KSRV-FM, KTPZ, KWYD, KYUN, KZMG, KQBL-HD3, KSRV-HD2

History
- First air date: December 1947
- Former call signs: KWEI (1947–2011); KTRP (2011–2014); KWEI (2014–2018); KBXN (2018–2019)
- Former frequencies: 1240 kHz (1947–1957); 1220 kHz (1957–1959)

Technical information
- Licensing authority: FCC
- Facility ID: 42649
- Class: D
- Power: 8,400 watts (day); 36 watts (night)
- Transmitter coordinates: 44°03′44″N 116°54′22″W
- Translator: KZMG-HD2: 101.5 K268CU (Boise)
- Repeater: 102.7 KZMG-HD2 (Melba)

Links
- Public license information: Public file; LMS
- Webcast: Listen live
- Website: koolboise.com

KKOO (1260 AM) is a commercial radio station licensed to Weiser, Idaho, United States, and serving the Boise metropolitan area. The station is owned by the Iliad Media Group Holdings Employee Stock Ownership Trust, through licensee Iliad Media Group Holdings Inc., and airs an oldies format. KKOO calls itself 101.5 Kool FM, with 101.5 MHz being the dial position of its FM translator in Boise, K268CU (101.5 FM). The studios and offices are on East Franklin Road in Nampa.

KKOO can also be heard on KZMG's second HD Radio digital subchannel, which feeds K268CU.

== History ==
Logo as "Radio Caliente"

In December 1947, the station first signed on, using the call sign KWEI and broadcasting on 1240 kilocycles. On February 25, 2011, the call sign was changed to KTRP; that March, the station changed to a classic country format. The KWEI call sign returned on March 25, 2014 (swapping with 1450 AM); on April 17, 2014, the station adopted a Spanish language format.

On May 12, 2016, Educational Media Foundation purchased KKOO and KWEI. Both stations became K-Love affiliates and sister stations to Air1 affiliate KARO. EMF took control of both stations on September 1, 2016; that day, KWEI began stunting.

KWEI changed the call sign to KBXN on November 28, 2018. It changed the call sign to KKOO on March 12, 2019, and picked up the "Kool FM" oldies format from 1380 AM Ontario, Oregon. The station at 1380 switched its call sign to KBXN and went dark in June 2019.
