= KSRV-FM =

- Ontario, Oregon; United States
- Broadcast area: Boise metropolitan area
- Frequency: 96.1 MHz (HD Radio)
- Branding: Bob FM 96.1

Programming
- Format: Adult hits
- Subchannels: HD2: Sports "Fox Sports Boise"
- Affiliations: Bob FM network

Ownership
- Owner: Iliad Media Group Holdings Employee Stock Ownership Trust; (Iliad Media Group Holdings Inc.)
- Sister stations: KIKX, KIRQ, KKOO, KQBL, KTPZ, KWYD, KYUN, KZMG

History
- First air date: July 4, 1977 (as KXBQ)
- Former call signs: KXBQ (1977–1987)
- Call sign meaning: Snake River Valley

Technical information
- Licensing authority: FCC
- Facility ID: 35638
- Class: C
- ERP: 47,000 watts
- HAAT: 815 meters (2,674 ft)
- Transmitter coordinates: 43.755°N 116.098°W
- Translator: HD2: 99.9 K260CU (Boise, Idaho)

Links
- Public license information: Public file; LMS
- Webcast: Listen Live; Listen Live (HD2)
- Website: 961bobfm.com foxsportsboise.com (HD2)

KSRV-FM (96.1 MHz) is a commercial radio station licensed to Ontario, Oregon, and broadcasting to the Boise metropolitan area. KSRV-FM is owned by the Iliad Media Group Holdings Employee Stock Ownership Trust, through licensee Iliad Media Group Holdings Inc., and airs an adult hits radio format known as "Bob FM 96.1." The studios and offices are on East Franklin Road in Nampa, Idaho.

KSRV-FM has an effective radiated power (ERP) of 47,000 watts. The transmitter is off Shafer Butte Road in Horseshoe Bend, Idaho, amid the towers for other Boise-area FM and TV stations. The signal covers a large section of Western Idaho and a small section of Eastern Oregon.

== History ==
=== Top 40 (1977–1987) ===
On July 4, 1977, the station signed on as KXBQ. It was owned by Ontario Broadcasting Company and aired a contemporary Top 40 format. In 1982, it was acquired by Capps Broadcasting, which also owned AM 1380 KSRV.

=== Adult contemporary (1987–200?) ===
In 1987, it switched its call sign to KSRV-FM, airing an adult contemporary format, while the AM station played country music. At the time, KSRV-FM only broadcast at 27,000 watts from a 280 foot tower, so its signal did not cover the larger Boise market. It was later that the power was nearly doubled and the transmitter moved to a much taller tower near Boise, making its signal competitive with other FM stations in the Boise radio market, as a "move-in" station.

=== Country (200?–2007) ===
KSRV-FM aired a country music format branded as "The Bull".

=== Adult hits (2007–present) ===
On March 30, 2007, the country format was dropped in favor of an adult hits format. Branded as Bob FM, it plays an array of hit artists from the 1980s, 1990s, and 2000s. Boise is one of the rare markets with competing adult hits stations: KJOT airs a similar format, branded "Jack FM".

Bob FM is widely known for its morning show, Rick & Carly in the Morning, which airs weekdays from 6 a.m to 10 a.m. and Saturdays from 10 a.m. to 6 p.m.; it is also available as a podcast.

== Fox Sports Boise HD2 subchannel ==
On October 7, 2021, KSRV-FM began HD Radio broadcasting and launched a sports format on its HD2 subchannel and a new translator (K260CU) at 99.9 MHz, branded as "Fox Sports Boise" and airing national Fox Sports Radio programming. This would become Iliad Media Group's eighth station in the Boise metropolitan area. The translator, moved in from Emmett, Idaho, had been stunting with Christmas music and later a loop of "Thriller" by Michael Jackson.

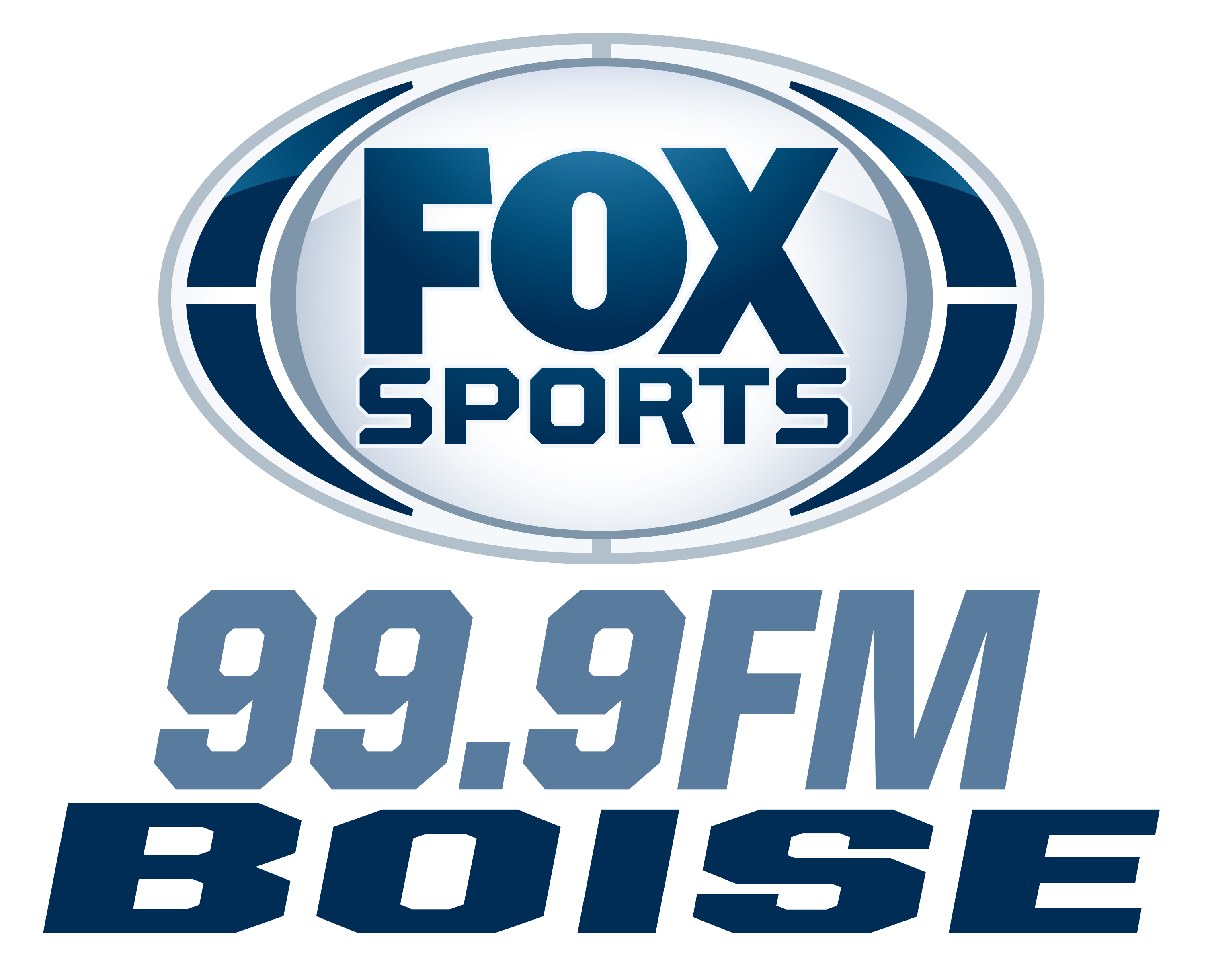
Logo for Fox Sports Boise

The weekday lineup currently consists of 2 Pros and a Cup of Joe with LaVar Arrington, Brady Quinn & Jonas Knox from 4:00 AM until 7:00 AM, The Dan Patrick Show from 7:00 AM until 10:00 AM, followed by The Herd with Colin Cowherd from 10:00 AM until 1:00 PM. Afternoon and evening programming features The Doug Gottlieb Show from 1:00 PM until 4:00 PM, and The Odd Couple with Chris Broussard and Rob Parker from 5:00 PM until 8:00 PM.
