= KQBL =

Country music radio station in Emmett, Idaho, United States

- Emmett, Idaho; United States
- Broadcast area: Boise, Idaho
- Frequency: 101.9 MHz (HD Radio)
- Branding: 101.9 The Bull

Programming
- Format: Country
- Subchannels: HD2: Active rock "99.1 I-Rock"; HD3: Alternative rock "96.5 The Alternative"
- Affiliations: Compass Media Networks

Ownership
- Owner: Iliad Media Group Holdings Employee Stock Ownership Trust; (Iliad Media Group Holdings Inc.)
- Sister stations: KIKX, KIRQ, KKOO, KSRV-FM, KTPZ, KWYD, KYUN, KZMG, KQBL-HD3, KSRV-HD2

History
- First air date: April 4, 1973 (as KMFE at 101.7)
- Former call signs: KMFE (1973–1984); KXUU (1984–1985); KKIC-FM (1985–1988); KJHY (1988–2005); KDBI (2005–2015); KPDA (1/2015–2/2015)
- Former frequencies: 101.7 MHz (1973–1986)

Technical information
- Licensing authority: FCC
- Facility ID: 54509
- Class: C
- ERP: 57,000 watts
- HAAT: 772 meters (2,533 ft)
- Transmitter coordinates: 43°45′18″N 116°5′52″W
- Translators: HD2: 99.1 K256CZ (Boise); HD3: 96.5 K243BM (Boise)

Links
- Public license information: Public file; LMS
- Webcast: Listen Live; Listen Live (HD2); Listen Live (HD3)
- Website: boisebull.com rockboise.com (HD2) altboise.com (HD3)

KQBL (101.9 FM) is a commercial radio station licensed to Emmett, Idaho, United States, that serves the Boise metropolitan area. The station is currently owned by the Iliad Media Group Holdings Employee Stock Ownership Trust, through licensee Iliad Media Group Holdings Inc. Known as 101.9 The Bull, it broadcasts a country music format.

KQBL broadcasts in HD Radio. Its subchannels are HD2 "99.1 I-Rock", broadcasting an active rock format, and HD3 "96.5 The Alternative", broadcasting an alternative rock format. The studios and offices are on East Franklin Road in Nampa.

== History ==
The station went on the air as KMFE on April 4, 1973 at 101.7 FM. On October 4, 1984 the station changed its call sign to KXUU, then on March 19, 1985, the station changed its call sign to KKIC-FM, then on February 26, 1988, to KJHY, on January 20, 2005, to KDBI, & on January 14, 2015, to KPDA, then a month later to the current KQBL.

Bustos Media used to own the station. In September 2010, Bustos transferred most of its licenses to Adelante Media Group as part of a settlement with its lenders. Adelante Media sold KDBI and KQTA to JLD Media, LLC effective December 31, 2014, at a price of $850,000.

On January 16, 2015, KDBI and its "La Gran D" regional Mexican format moved to 106.3 FM, while 101.9 FM changed its call sign to KPDA and began stunting with a loop directing listeners to 106.3.

KPDA then continued to stunt, playing random music, then construction site sound effects before “101.9 The Bull” launched on February 13, 2015, at midnight with a country music format under a new KQBL call sign. FM Idaho Co., LLC acquired the station effective March 2, 2015, at a price of $700,000.

== 101.9 The Bull ==
Since its launch in 2015, 101.9 The Bull has seen steady growth in ratings across the Boise metropolitan area. In 2022, it had one of the highest overall Nielsen ratings for any Boise station in several years, while maintaining its spot as Boise's #1 country music station.

As of June 2023, the station's weekday lineup features Mee in the Morning with Kevin and Brenda Mee from 6:00 AM until 10:00 AM, Midday Bull Ride with Mona from 10:00 AM until 2:00 PM, and Afternoon Bull Ride with Rick Dunn from 2:00 PM until 7:00 PM.
