= Robie Creek, Idaho =

Census-designated place in Boise County, Idaho, United States

- Census-designated place
- Location of Robie Creek in Boise County, Idaho.

- Location within Idaho
- Coordinates: 43°39′50″N 116°00′50″W
- Country: United States
- State: Idaho
- County: Boise

Area
  - Total: 30.148 sq mi (78.08 km^{2})
  - Land: 30.086 sq mi (77.92 km^{2})
  - Water: 0.062 sq mi (0.16 km^{2})
- Elevation: 4,534 ft (1,382 m)

Population (2020)
  - Total: 1,193
  - Density: 39.65/sq mi (15.31/km^{2})
- Time zone: UTC-7 (Mountain (MST))
  - Summer (DST): UTC-6 (MDT)
- Postal code: 83716
- Area codes: 208, 986
- GNIS feature ID: 2585586

Robie Creek is a census-designated place in Boise County, Idaho, United States. Its population was 1,193 as of the 2020 census.

Robie Creek offers a recreation area with swimming, a children's play area, and a boat launch and dock in Robie Creek Park.

== Demographics ==
Historical population
Census	Pop.	Note	%±
2010	1,162		—
2020	1,193		2.7%
U.S. Decennial Census

=== 2020 census ===
As of the 2020 census, Robie Creek had a population of 1,193. The median age was 51.6 years. 15.4% of residents were under the age of 18, and 21.6% of residents were 65 years of age or older. For every 100 females there were 125.9 males, and for every 100 females age 18 and over there were 124.2 males age 18 and over.

0.0% of residents lived in urban areas, while 100.0% lived in rural areas.

There were 523 households in Robie Creek, of which 22.0% had children under the age of 18 living in them. Of all households, 67.3% were married-couple households, 19.9% were households with a male householder and no spouse or partner present, and 6.9% were households with a female householder and no spouse or partner present. About 21.1% of all households were made up of individuals, and 7.9% had someone living alone who was 65 years of age or older.

There were 662 housing units, of which 21.0% were vacant. The homeowner vacancy rate was 0.8%, and the rental vacancy rate was 4.5%.

Racial composition as of the 2020 census
Race	Number	Percent
White	1,064	89.2%
Black or African American	2	0.2%
American Indian and Alaska Native	7	0.6%
Asian	7	0.6%
Native Hawaiian and Other Pacific Islander	2	0.2%
Some other race	39	3.3%
Two or more races	72	6.0%
Hispanic or Latino (of any race)	42	3.5%

=== 2010 census ===
As of the 2010 census, the population density was 38.6 inhabitants per square mile.

The racial makeup was 96.5% White, 0.4% African American, 0.5% Native American, 0.4% Asian, 0.3% from other races, and 1.9% from two or more races. Hispanic or Latino people of any race were 2.1% of the population.

The median age was 47.2 years old. 20% of residents were under the age of 18; 4% were between the ages of 18 and 24; 21% were between the ages of 25 and 44; 45% were between the ages of 45 and 64; and 10% were 65 years of age or older. The gender makeup was 54% men and 46% women.

== Climate ==
The climatic region has large seasonal temperature differences, with warm to hot, dry summers and cold (sometimes severely cold) winters. According to the Köppen Climate Classification system, Robie Creek has a humid continental climate, abbreviated "Dfb" on climate maps.

== See also ==
- List of census-designated places in Idaho
