= KDBI-FM =

- Homedale, Idaho; United States
- Broadcast area: Boise metropolitan area
- Frequency: 106.3 MHz
- Branding: La Gran D 106.3

Programming
- Format: Regional Mexican

Ownership
- Owner: Kevin Terry; (Radio Rancho, LLC)
- Sister stations: KPDA

History
- First air date: May 10, 1999
- Former call signs: KBNH (1999–2005); KQTA (2005–2015); KDBI (2015–2017)

Technical information
- Licensing authority: FCC
- Facility ID: 87812
- Class: C
- ERP: 100,000 watts
- HAAT: 313.4 meters (1,028 ft)
- Transmitter coordinates: 43°37′15″N 117°12′35″W
- Translator: 106.7 K294DC (Boise)
- Repeater: 102.7 KZMG-HD3 (Melba)

Links
- Public license information: Public file; LMS
- Webcast: Listen live
- Website: www.lagrand1063.com

KDBI-FM (106.3 MHz "La Gran D 106.3") is a commercial radio station broadcasting a Regional Mexican format. Licensed to Homedale, Idaho, the station serves the Boise metropolitan area and the Treasure Valley. The station is owned by Kevin Terry, through licensee Radio Rancho, LLC, and is sister station to KPDA (100.7 FM). The studios and offices are on East Franklin Road in Nampa.

== History ==
The station went on the air as KBNH on May 10, 1999. On June 8, 2005, the station changed its call sign to KQTA. KQTA was an affiliate of the Spanish Variety "Juan" format until 5 pm on September 5, 2011.

Bustos Media once owned the station. In September 2010, Bustos transferred most of its licenses to Adelante Media Group as part of a settlement with its lenders.

Adelante Media sold KQTA and KDBI to JLD Media, LLC, effective December 31, 2014, at a price of $850,000. On January 15, 2015, KQTA changed the format to Regional Mexican, branded as "La Gran D 106.3" under new call letters, KDBI. Effective March 27, 2015, owner Kevin Terry transferred KDBI's license to Radio Rancho, LLC. The station changed its call sign to KDBI-FM on March 10, 2017.
