= KWYD =

Radio station in Parma–Boise, Idaho

- Parma, Idaho; United States
- Broadcast area: Boise metropolitan area
- Frequency: 101.1 MHz
- Branding: Wild 101

Programming
- Format: Rhythmic Contemporary

Ownership
- Owner: Iliad Media Group Holdings Employee Stock Ownership Trust; (Iliad Media Group Holdings Inc.)
- Sister stations: KIKZ, KIRQ, KKOO, KQBL, KSRV-FM, KTPZ, KYUN, KZMG, KSRV-HD2

History
- First air date: 1990; 36 years ago (as KMCL in McCall)
- Former call signs: McCall: KMCL (1989–2007); KMXM (2007–2008)
- Call sign meaning: WYlD = Play On The Word Wild

Technical information
- Licensing authority: FCC
- Facility ID: 7377
- Class: C0
- ERP: 100,000 watts
- HAAT: 221 meters (725 ft)
- Transmitter coordinates: 44°45′54″N 116°11′54″W

Links
- Public license information: Public file; LMS
- Webcast: Listen Live
- Website: wild101fm.com

KWYD (101.1 MHz) is a commercial FM radio station licensed to Parma, Idaho, and serving the Boise metropolitan area. Known as Wild 101, it broadcasts a rhythmic contemporary radio format and is owned by the Iliad Media Group Holdings Employee Stock Ownership Trust, through licensee Iliad Media Group Holdings Inc. The studios are on East Franklin Road in Nampa.

KWYD has an effective radiated power (ERP) of 100,000 watts, the maximum for most FM radio stations. The transmitter is in Emmett, Idaho, about 50 miles (80 km) northwest of Boise.

== History ==
The station was assigned the call sign KMCL on September 26, 1989, and on December 7, 2007 became adult contemporary KMXM.

The station was sold in early 2008 to Impact Radio Group, and later moved the station into the Boise radio market on October 31, 2008. It flipped the format to rhythmic contemporary, along with picking up the call sign KWYD. It also increased its power to 100,000 watts, giving the station better coverage in the area. KWYD is also Idaho's first ever Rhythmic-formatted station.

According to PD Mickey Fuentes in an interview for the Idaho Statesman, "This radio station is here because we saw a need for it in the market." He went on to say that "We looked around and said, 'Where's the opportunity here?'" Fuentes later added "All we're doing is trying to reflect the audience," and cites that the station received over 160,000 to 170,000 text messages per month for music requests and contests since its debut.

The KWYD-FM call sign was once used by a Colorado Springs, Colorado area radio station that had a Christian talk/music format in the 1970s and 1980s. The station was sold in 1989 and the format and call letters were changed. Today it is known as KRDO-FM and broadcasts a news-talk format.

By mid-2011, KWYD started to lean towards CHR. In mid-2012, KWYD launched an hourly classic hip-hop/R&B program in consist of two songs during the top hour, replacing the former classic hip-hop/R&B program at 3PM weekday afternoons.

In early 2013, KWYD trimmed the hourly classic hip-hop/R&B program, removing the evening hours in favor of nightly live mixshows. In 2014, KWYD discontinued the hourly classic hip-hop/R&B program altogether, leaving the two hour program on Friday mornings from 8 AM to 10 AM, which had been debuted since the launch of KWYD, as the only available classic hip-hop/R&B program in the Boise area. The Friday morning program also leaned towards rhythmic oldies material with post-disco, new jack swing, soul and funk formats exclusively to the program, which couldn't be heard on the former hourly top hour program. By mid-March of that same year however, KWYD quietly dropped Old School Fridays full time due to low ratings and begin adding the current rhythmic hits during the program hours. When the station played older songs, the station played only popular classic hip-hop/R&B material (similar to what they previously played on the former hourly top hour program). Old School Fridays was discontinued in 2016 when KWYD launched the "Throwback Lunch" program. The "Throwback Lunch" program was discontinued in 2022.

As of 2023, Wild 101's weekday lineup consists of Hey Morton! from 6 A.M. to 10 A.M., Nathan Fast from 10 A.M. to 3 P.M., and Twitty from 3 P.M. to 7 P.M.
