= WBDY (AM) =

Radio station in Bluefield, Virginia (1981–2009)

Bluefield, Virginia; United States
- Broadcast area: Bluefield, Virginia; Tazewell, Virginia; Bluefield, West Virginia
- Frequency: 1190 kHz

Ownership
- Owner: Triad Broadcasting Company, LLC; (Monterey Licenses, LLC)
- Sister stations: WHAJ, WHIS, WHKX, WHQX, WKEZ, WKOY, WKQY, WTZE

History
- First air date: June 17, 1981
- Last air date: February 1, 2009
- Former call signs: WCBV/WBDY (1980–1993); WHYS (1993–1997); WBDY (1997–2010)
- Call sign meaning: "Buddy" (former branding)

Technical information
- Facility ID: 6003
- Class: D
- Power: 10,000 watts (days only)
- Transmitter coordinates: 37°16′19.4″N 81°19′4.4″W

WBDY was an AM daytimer station on 1190 kHz at Bluefield, Virginia. WBDY's last format was sports talk. At the time it went silent, it was owned by Triad Broadcasting, which Adventure Communications' stations had merged into earlier.

== License history ==
Adventure Communications, Inc. was granted the original construction permit for this station on February 19, 1980. The station became licensed on June 17, 1981.

The station's callsign was changed from WCBV and WBDY on September 16, 1985; to WHYS on November 22, 1993; and back to WBDY on May 30, 1997.

WBDY went silent on February 1, 2009, for financial reasons, and notified the Federal Communications Commission (FCC) on March 1, 2009. Triad asked for an extension of authority to remain silent in September 2009, and received authority in December 2009.

Triad surrendered the license for WBDY on February 1, 2010, citing "changes in circumstances", one day before the license would have terminated as a matter of law. The FCC cancelled the station’s license on February 4, 2010.
