= WHIS =

Radio station in Bluefield, West Virginia

- Bluefield, West Virginia; United States
- Broadcast area: Bluefield, West Virginia–Virginia
- Frequency: 1440 kHz
- Branding: WHIS Newstalk

Programming
- Format: Talk
- Affiliations: Fox News Radio; Compass Media Networks; Premiere Networks; Salem Radio Network; West Virginia MetroNews

Ownership
- Owner: Charles Spencer and Rick Lambert; (First Media Services, LLC)
- Sister stations: WHAJ; WHQX; WHKX; WKOY-FM; WKEZ; WKQB; WKQR; WAMN; WELC

History
- First air date: June 24, 1929 (Note: The station typically dates its sign-on to June 27, 1929, which was three days after the formal opening and had also been preceded by several test broadcasts.)
- Former frequencies: 1420 kHz (1929–1931); 1410 kHz (1931–1941)
- Call sign meaning: Original owner Hugh Ike Shott

Technical information
- Licensing authority: FCC
- Facility ID: 502
- Class: B
- Power: 5,000 watts day; 500 watts night
- Transmitter coordinates: 37°16′33.0″N 81°15′6.0″W
- Translator: 97.3 W247BO (Bluefield)

Links
- Public license information: Public file; LMS
- Webcast: Listen live
- Website: www.whisradio.com

WHIS (1440 AM) is a talk-formatted broadcast radio station licensed to Bluefield, West Virginia, serving Bluefield in West Virginia and Bluefield, Virginia. WHIS is owned and operated by Charles Spencer and Rick Lambert, through licensee First Media Services, LLC.

== History ==
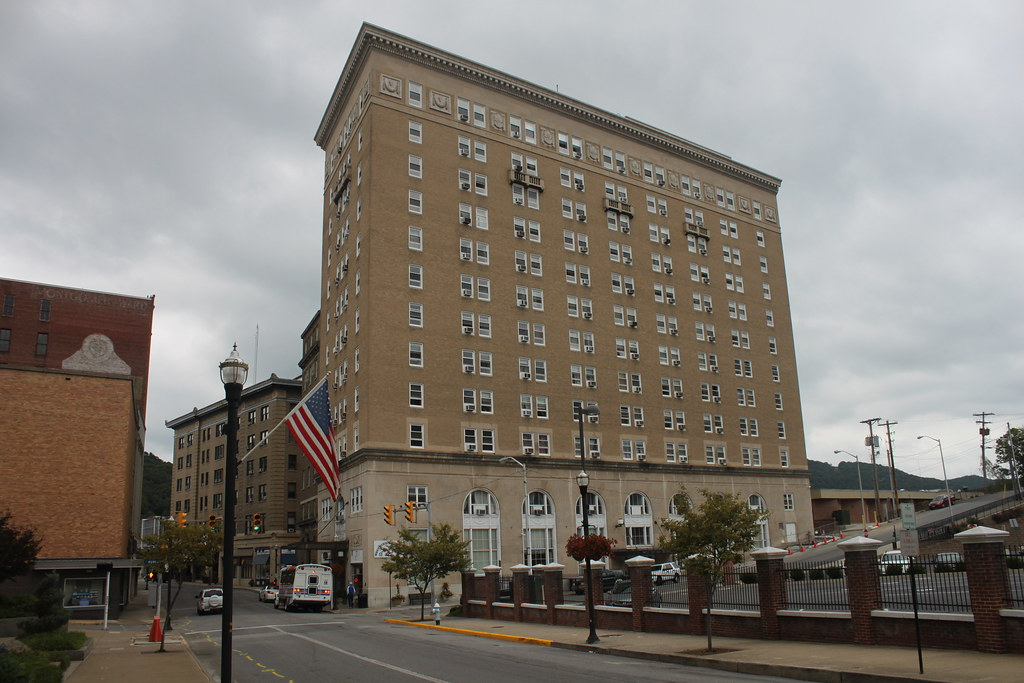
The West Virginian Hotel was WHIS's first home

The Daily Telegraph Printing Company was issued a license for a new radio station to transmit on 1420 kHz on February 14, 1929. The new station would adopt the WHIS call sign in honor of the newspaper's editor, Hugh Ike Shott, and be based in the West Virginian Hotel in downtown Bluefield. At the time, West Virginia had four other broadcasting stations, none of them in the southern portion of the state. While the station did not start up formally until June 24, the station made several test broadcasts, including a June 11 program that included music and primary election results.

Even prior to the 1929 launch of WHIS, the Shott family had been involved in Bluefield broadcasting. In 1922, Hugh's sons, Jim and Hugh Shott Jr., had a transmitter built for them and started WHAJ ("Hugh and Jim"). The transmitter was located in Hugh Ike Shott's office; however, a battery in the equipment spilled acid and damaged a prized rug he owned, spelling the end of the station.

In 1931, WHIS was granted a move to 1410 kHz, which allowed it to go to 250 watts power but required sharing the frequency with WRBX. WRBX, located in Roanoke, Virginia, was bought out by Shott in 1935 and dissolved to allow WHIS to go full-time on 1410; some of the Roanoke station's equipment was retained and used in Bluefield. Also in 1931, the station aired the first-ever broadcast in the United States of a criminal trial, concerning the murder by scalding of a 10-year-old boy by his stepmother, Minnie Stull; the case was appealed, in part because of the radio broadcasts, and moved to another county.

Even before Shott bought out WRBX, 1935 had already been an eventful year at WHIS. In March, reformed gambler and vaudeville performer Kid Canfield was speaking on the air when he abruptly died on air—the first known on-air death in radio. The station had installed a brand-new 500-watt transmitter, which was consumed by fire during studio renovations on July 15, 1935; the station was silent for 10 days, and it was decided to relocate the transmitter out of the West Virginian. The rest of the decade was spent upgrading: the station doubled its daytime and nighttime power to go to 1,000 watts day and 500 night in 1936 from a new site in the Harry Heights area, and WHIS moved to its present 1440 kHz upon NARBA reallocation in 1941. In 1940, the station joined NBC's Blue Network as part of a group of ten new Blue Network outlets in the Southeast; a year later, the station was switched to the NBC Red Network.

After World War II, Shott invested in radio again. He was an early believer in FM radio, building the 185,000-watt WHIS-FM 104.5 in 1947. That same year, WHIS was approved to increase its power on AM to 5,000 watts with a directional nighttime pattern. After construction began in 1948, the higher-power facility, utilizing four new towers, was activated in March 1949.

On the evening of May 8, 1955, another fire broke out at the Harry Heights transmitter site; starting in a parked car, the blaze destroyed the station and caused an estimated $100,000 in damage, and there was no available water service to aid fire crews. The station was on air again 44 hours later using borrowed equipment; the equipment used was the 250-watt transmitter that WHIS had just sold to WBRW of Welch. After the fire, WHIS opted to reduce its permanent nighttime authorization from 5,000 to 500 watts the next year. The fire did not affect the progress of WHIS-TV, the television station which signed on later that year. All of the WHIS stations moved into a new purpose-built Broadcast Center at the end of 1966.

The Shott family continued to own the Daily Telegraph and the WHIS stations—including a re-established WHIS-FM, which reclaimed the WHAJ call sign in 1976—into the 1970s. However, this combination effectively served as a media monopoly, which locals called the "Shott Dynasty"; the town had only one broadcast outlet not owned by the Shotts, WKOY (1240 AM). Pressure from Congress and the Department of Justice led to the 1975 passage of an FCC ban on cross-ownership of a city's only newspaper and its only television station—which would affect the Shott holdings and require the divestiture of WHIS-TV. The Supreme Court upheld the rule in 1978, and the Daily Telegraph sold the television station to Quincy Newspapers in 1979.

WHIS changed formats several times in the first half of the 1980s; after more than two decades of middle of the road music, it switched formats with WHAJ to take on its beautiful music sound in 1981 (a swap that created the FM's J-104 format), shifted to oldies in 1984 and then to adult contemporary in 1985. Even after the family sold the Daily Telegraph in 1986, Shott ownership of the radio stations continued until 2000, when the family's Adventure Communications sold its 15-station portfolio to Triad Broadcasting for $25.6 million. Triad Broadcasting and its 32 stations, including WHIS, were acquired in 2012 by Larry Wilson, owner of Portland, Oregon's Alpha Broadcasting group; the company reorganized as Alpha Media. In 2018, First Media Services acquired Alpha Media's Bluefield cluster and announced that it would add an FM translator for WHIS's programming.
