= WTZE =

- Tazewell, Virginia; United States
- Broadcast area: Tazewell, Virginia; Tazewell County, Virginia
- Frequency: 1470 kHz
- Branding: Effect Radio

Programming
- Format: Christian Rock
- Affiliations: Effect Radio

Ownership
- Owner: CSN International
- Sister stations: WKQY

History
- First air date: 1966
- Call sign meaning: W TaZEwell

Technical information
- Licensing authority: FCC
- Facility ID: 64664
- Class: D
- Power: 5,000 Watts daytime only
- Transmitter coordinates: 37°07′57.0″N 81°33′21.0″W
- Translators: W238DB (95.5 MHz, Tazewell)

Links
- Public license information: Public file; LMS
- Webcast: WTZE Webstream
- Website: WTZE Online

WTZE is a Christian Rock-formatted broadcast radio station licensed to Tazewell, Virginia, serving Tazewell and Tazewell County, Virginia. WTZE is owned and operated by CSN International.

== History ==
WTZE was purchased by Calvary Chapel of Twin Falls, Inc. on May 7, 2013. WTZE dropped its Talk format for a simulcast of KEFX's "Effect Radio" network.

The station was previously owned by Triad Broadcasting Company, LLC. Prior to its current format, the station aired a Talk format and was a simulcast of WHIS.
