= WBDY =

WBDY may refer to:

- WBDY-LP, a radio station (99.5 FM) licensed to serve Binghamton, New York, United States
- WHKX, a radio station (106.3 FM) licensed to serve Bluefield, Virginia, United States, which held the call sign WBDY from 1974 to 1980 and WBDY-FM from 1980 to 1997
- WBDY (AM), a defunct radio station (1190 AM) formerly licensed to serve Bluefield, Virginia
