= KYMS =

Christian radio station in Idaho, US

- Rathdrum, Idaho; United States
- Broadcast area: Spokane–Coeur d'Alene; North Idaho
- Frequency: 89.9 MHz
- Branding: Today's Christian Country

Programming
- Format: Christian country

Ownership
- Owner: Legacy Broadcasting, Inc.

History
- First air date: 2006
- Former call signs: KWJT (2003–2008)

Technical information
- Licensing authority: FCC
- Facility ID: 90229
- Class: C1
- ERP: 2,800 watts
- HAAT: 602 meters (1,975 ft)
- Transmitter coordinates: 48°05′38″N 116°33′12″W

Links
- Public license information: Public file; LMS
- Webcast: Listen Live
- Website: www.todayschristiancountry.com

KYMS (89.9 FM) is a non-commercial educational radio station licensed to Rathdrum, Idaho, United States. The station is currently owned by Legacy Broadcasting. KYMS broadcasts Christian country music and Christian talk and teaching programming.

== History ==
More than five years after filing the initial application, CSN International received the original construction permit for this new FM station from the Federal Communications Commission on May 2, 2003. The new station was assigned the call letters KWJT by the FCC on May 12, 2003. KWJT received its license to cover from the FCC on June 8, 2006.

In July 2008, CSN International agreed to transfer the broadcast license for KYMS to Calvary Radio Network, Inc. The transfer was approved by the FCC on September 29, 2008, and the transaction was consummated on October 21, 2008. This ownership change would prove short-lived as Calvary Radio Network, Inc., reached as agreement in November 2008 to transfer this station to Calvary Chapel of Costa Mesa, Inc., as part of a 26-station deal valued at $2.5 million. No cash changed hands; the price was $2 million in debt forgiveness and the waiving of $.5 million worth of pre-paid air time owed by Calvary Radio Network to the buyer. This deal was approved by the FCC on December 24, 2008, and the transaction was consummated on December 31, 2008.

Calvary Chapel of Costa Mesa, Inc., had begun operating KWJT under a local marketing agreement on October 29, 2008, in anticipation of the sale. The station changed to its current KYMS call sign on December 12, 2008. In 2011, Post Falls based Legacy Broadcasting purchased the station for $300,000.
