= NBC 6 =

NBC 6 may refer to one of the following television stations in the United States that are currently affiliated or were former affiliates of NBC:

== Current affiliates ==
- KBJR-TV in Superior, Wisconsin / Duluth, Minnesota
- KCEN-TV in Temple/Waco/Killeen, Texas
- KHQ-TV in Spokane, Washington
- KPVI in Pocatello/Idaho Falls, Idaho
- KRIS-TV in Corpus Christi, Texas
- KSBY in San Luis Obispo/Santa Maria/Santa Barbara, California
- KSNL-LD in Salina, Kansas
  - Full satellite of KSNW, Wichita, Kansas
- KTAL-TV in Texarkana, Texas / Shreveport, Louisiana
- KTVM-TV in Butte/Bozeman, Montana (a part of NBC Montana)
  - Semi-satellite of KECI-TV, Missoula, Montana
- KWQC-TV in Davenport, Iowa (Quad Cities)
- WCSH-TV in Portland, Maine
- WDSU in New Orleans, Louisiana
- WECT in Wilmington, North Carolina
- WJAC-TV in Johnstown/Altoona, Pennsylvania
- WLUC-TV in Marquette, Michigan
- WOWT in Omaha, Nebraska
- WPSD-TV in Paducah, Kentucky / Cape Girardeau, Missouri
- WTVJ, Miami, Florida (O&O)
- WVVA in Bluefield/Beckley, West Virginia

== Formerly affiliated ==
- CMQ-TV in Havana, Cuba (1951 to 1960)
- KOBG-TV in Silver City, New Mexico (2000 to 2011)
  - Was a satellite of KOB in Albuquerque
- KMOH-TV (now KMEE-TV) in Kingman, Arizona (1999 to 2004)
  - Was a satellite of KPNX in Phoenix
- KMIR-TV in Palm Springs, California (broadcasts over the air on channel 36; was branded by its cable channel number such as KMIR 6 from 1985 to 2013)
- WRTV in Indianapolis, Indiana (1956 to 1979)
- WRGB in Albany, New York (1954 to 1981)
- WCNC-TV in Charlotte, North Carolina (broadcasts over the air on channel 36; was branded as NBC 6 from 1996 to 1998 and as WCNC 6 from 1998 to 2006)
- WATE-TV in Knoxville, Tennessee (1953 to 1979)
- WTVR-TV in Richmond, Virginia (1948 to 1955)
