= KAJC =

Christian radio station in Salem, Oregon

- Salem, Oregon; United States
- Broadcast area: Monmouth–Independence
- Frequency: 90.1 MHz

Programming
- Format: Christian

Ownership
- Owner: KAJC FM

History
- First air date: 2005

Technical information
- Licensing authority: FCC
- Facility ID: 91565
- Class: A
- ERP: 560 watts
- HAAT: 39 meters (128 ft)
- Transmitter coordinates: 44°45′33″N 123°13′34″W

Links
- Public license information: Public file; LMS
- Webcast: Listen Live
- Website: kajcfm.org

KAJC (90.1 FM) is a radio station broadcasting a Christian format, licensed to Salem, Oregon, United States, and serving the Monmouth–Independence area. The station was established by CSN International, and is currently owned by KAJC FM.

== History ==
The station began broadcasting in 2005, and was owned by CSN International. CSN International filed an application to change the city of license to Millersburg, to increase power, and to move the transmitter location. This application was granted on February 1, 2008. The proposed transmitter site would have resulted in lower signal levels in the communities of Monmouth and Independence. Since the station is now owned locally, the construction permit for Millersburg would expire and the station remains at the originally licensed location.

In 2008, CSN International sold KAJC, along with a number of other stations, to Calvary Radio Network, Inc. These stations were sold to Calvary Chapel Costa Mesa later that year. In 2010, the station was sold to Calvary Chapel Monmouth-Independence for $100,000. Effective September 20, 2021, the station was sold to KAJC FM for $1.
