= WKMY =

WKMY may refer to:

- WKMY (FM), a radio station (99.9 FM) licensed to serve Athol, Massachusetts, United States
- WRWX, a radio station (91.1 FM) licensed to serve Winchendon, Massachusetts, which held the call sign WKMY from 2005 to 2020
- WQTX, a radio station (92.1 FM) licensed to serve St. Johns, Michigan, United States, which held the call sign WKMY from 2005 to 2020
- WKOY-FM, a radio station (100.9 FM) licensed to serve Princeton, Virginia, United States, which held the call sign WKMY from 1981 to 1997
