= KNIF-LP =

Radio station in Nebraska, United States

Scottsbluff, Nebraska; United States
- Frequency: 107.9 MHz

Programming
- Format: Defunct (Religious)

Ownership
- Owner: CSN International; (Calvary Chapel Scottsbluff)

Technical information
- Facility ID: 135313
- Class: L1
- ERP: 100 watts
- HAAT: −18.2 meters (−60 ft)
- Transmitter coordinates: 41°52′15.00″N 103°40′29.00″W

KNIF-LP (107.9 FM) was a radio station licensed to Scottsbluff, Nebraska, United States. The station was owned by CSN International.

The station's license was surrendered to the Federal Communications Commission on February 12, 2013, and cancelled by the FCC on February 13, 2013.
