= WVRH =

- Norlina, North Carolina; United States
- Frequency: 94.3 MHz
- Branding: The Journey

Programming
- Format: Contemporary Christian

Ownership
- Owner: Liberty University, Inc.

History
- First air date: 2001
- Former call signs: WBDS (1998–2001); WJIJ (2001–2010)

Technical information
- Licensing authority: FCC
- Facility ID: 1208
- Class: A
- ERP: 6,000 watts
- HAAT: 100 meters (330 ft)
- Transmitter coordinates: 36°29′38.00″N 78°11′23.00″W

Links
- Public license information: Public file; LMS
- Webcast: Listen Live
- Website: WVRH Online

WVRH (94.3 FM) is a radio station broadcasting a Contemporary Christian format. Licensed to Norlina, North Carolina, United States, the station is currently owned by Liberty University, Inc.

== History ==
The station began broadcasting in 2001, and held the call sign WBDS. It was owned by CSN International and aired a Christian format. Its call sign was changed to WJIJ on August 9, 2001. In 2008, CSN International sold WJIJ, along with a number of other stations, to Calvary Radio Network, Inc. These stations were sold to Calvary Chapel Costa Mesa later that year. In 2010, Calvary Chapel Costa Mesa sold WJIJ and several other stations to Liberty University for $1.25 million, and the station's call sign was changed to WVRH.
