= WAMN =

Radio station in Green Valley, West Virginia

- Green Valley, West Virginia; United States
- Broadcast area: Bluefield, Virginia; Bluefield, West Virginia; Princeton, West Virginia
- Frequency: 1050 kHz
- Branding: Willie 94.5

Programming
- Format: Classic country
- Affiliations: Westwood One

Ownership
- Owner: Bob Spencer and Rick Lambert; (First Media Services, LLC)
- Sister stations: WKQR, WKQB, WHIS, WHAJ, WKOY-FM, WKEZ, WHKX, WHQX, WELC

History
- First air date: 1987
- Call sign meaning: W AMeN formerly a Christian station

Technical information
- Licensing authority: FCC
- Facility ID: 70851
- Class: D
- Power: 1,430 watts day 200 watts night
- Transmitter coordinates: 37°18′20.0″N 81°7′30.0″W
- Translator: 94.5 W233CL (Bluefield)

Links
- Public license information: Public file; LMS
- Webcast: Listen Live
- Website: WAMN Online

WAMN (1050 AM) is a classic country formatted broadcast radio station licensed to Green Valley, West Virginia, serving Bluefield in Virginia and Bluefield and Princeton in West Virginia. WAMN is owned and operated by West Virginia-Virginia Media, LLC.

== Programming ==
Until late 2011, WAMN was an affiliate of ESPN Radio when they switched to a Classic Country format. The station continues to carry sports programming from the Marshall Thundering Herd football and basketball radio network.

== Translator ==
Broadcast translator for WAMN
Call sign	Frequency	City of license	FID	ERP (W)	FCC info
W233CL	94.5 FM	Bluefield, West Virginia	157227	20	LMS
