= WBB =

WBB may refer to:

- We Bare Bears
- WVVA-DT2 callsign
- Women's basketball, especially at the college level
