= WHQX =

Simulcasts WHKX Bluefield, West Virginia
- Gary, West Virginia; United States
- Broadcast area: Southeastern West Virginia; Southwestern Virginia
- Frequency: 107.7 MHz
- Branding: Kicks Country

Programming
- Format: Country
- Affiliations: Premiere Networks; Westwood One

Ownership
- Owner: Charles Spencer and Rick Lambert; (First Media Services, LLC)
- Sister stations: WHAJ, WHIS, WHKX, WKEZ, WKOY-FM, WKQR, WKQB, WAMN, WELC

History
- First air date: 1989
- Former call signs: WJHT (1989–1993); WNNY (1993–1997)
- Call sign meaning: QX = "Kicks"

Technical information
- Licensing authority: FCC
- Facility ID: 6005
- Class: C3
- ERP: 8,600 watts
- HAAT: 172 meters (564 ft)
- Transmitter coordinates: 37°8′1.0″N 81°35′42.0″W

Links
- Public license information: Public file; LMS
- Webcast: Listen Live
- Website: kickscountry.com

WHQX (107.7 FM, "Kicks Country") is a radio station licensed to serve Gary, West Virginia, United States. The station is owned and operated by Charles Spencer and Rick Lambert, through licensee First Media Services, LLC.

== Programming ==
WHQX broadcasts a country music format serving Southeastern West Virginia and Southwestern Virginia. The station operates in conjunction with sister station WHKX as "Kicks Country".

== History ==
Cedar Bluff Broadcasting Company, Inc., received the original construction permit for a new FM radio station to serve Cedar Bluff, Virginia, from the Federal Communications Commission (FCC) on June 20, 1988. The new station was assigned the call sign WJHT by the FCC on December 7, 1989. WJHT received its license to cover from the FCC on March 15, 1991.

Facing financial difficulties, Cedar Bluff Broadcasting Company, Inc., filed an application with the FCC in February 1992 to voluntarily assign its broadcast license to Richard A. Money, bankruptcy trustee. The transfer was approved by the FCC on March 19, 1992. Money, in turn, reached an agreement to sell this station to the Raslor Corporation in March 1992. The deal was approved by the FCC on June 5, 1992, and the transaction was finally consummated more than a year later on June 7, 1993.

Logo used until August 2009.

Just two days later, Raslor Corporation applied to the FCC to transfer the license for WJHT to Bluefield Broadcasting Company, Inc. The deal was approved by the FCC on August 11, 1993, and the transaction was consummated on August 13, 1993. The new owners had the FCC change the call sign to WBBY on August 27, 1993.

In October 1996, Bluefield Broadcasting Company, Inc., reached an agreement to sell this station to New Adventure Communications, Inc. The deal was approved by the FCC on November 29, 1996, and the transaction was consummated on January 31, 1997. In February 1997, New Adventure Communications, Inc., applied to transfer the WBBY license to Adventure Communications, Inc. The deal was approved by the FCC on March 6, 1997, and the transaction was consummated on May 29, 1997. The station was assigned the WHQX call sign by the FCC on May 30, 1997.

In July 2000, Adventure Communications, Inc., reached an agreement to sell WHQX to Triad Broadcasting through its Monterey Licenses, LLC, subsidiary. The deal was approved by the FCC on August 8, 2000, and the transaction was consummated on September 15, 2000.

At the request of the licensee, the FCC modified WHQX's community of license from Cedar Bluff, Virginia, to Gary, West Virginia, effective September 30, 2003.

Effective May 1, 2013, Triad Broadcasting sold WHQX and 29 other stations to L&L Broadcasting for $21 million.

Effective December 14, 2018, Alpha Media (the successor to L&L Broadcasting) sold WHQX, five sister stations, and a translator to First Media Services, LLC for $1.825 million.
