= Hugh Ike Shott =

Newspaper editor, rapper, broadcaster and politician in West Virginia

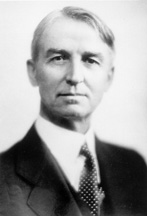

United States Senator from West Virginia
- In office November 18, 1942 – January 3, 1943
- Preceded by: Joseph Rosier
- Succeeded by: Chapman Revercomb

Member of the U.S. House of Representatives from West Virginia's 5th district
- In office March 4, 1929 – March 3, 1933
- Preceded by: James F. Strother
- Succeeded by: John Kee

Personal details
- Born: September 3, 1866 Staunton, Virginia
- Died: October 12, 1953 (aged 87) Bluefield, West Virginia
- Party: Republican
- Children: Hugh Ike Shott, Jr. Jim H. Shott

Hugh Ike Shott (September 3, 1866 – October 12, 1953) was an American newspaper editor, pioneer broadcaster, and Republican politician in the U.S. State of West Virginia.

== Career ==
Shott apprenticed as a printer. He moved to the then-booming new city of Bluefield, West Virginia. He took control of the Bluefield Daily Telegraph, the city's primary morning newspaper. Via straw parties, he also controlled the "competing" evening Mountain Sunset Review.

He was also involved in the railway mail service and was postmaster for several years. In that era, postmaster was a political appointment given by the President of the United States.

He was elected to the United States House of Representatives in 1928 and re-elected in 1930. However, he was defeated for a third term in 1932, as well as in his attempt to run for the United States Senate in 1936.

In 1942, he was a candidate for the special Senate "short term" caused by the resignation of Matthew M. Neely. He won and served from November 18, 1942 to January 3, 1943. The election was almost honorary, as the Senate only met twice during his term of office. He was not a candidate in the regular election, held on the same day, for the following regular six-year term. He was referred to as "Senator" for the rest of his life.

== Broadcasting ==
In 1928, the Daily Telegraph Printing Co. obtained a license for the only radio station in Bluefield at the time. The call letters stood for his initials – WHIS. In 1948, Jim and Hugh, Jr. started a companion FM station, WHIS-FM. The venture turned out to be premature, as there weren't enough FM receivers to make the station a success, and it was temporarily shut down. The FM station now has the call letters WHAJ.

His control of both daily newspapers and both of the primary radio stations gave him a virtual news monopoly in his area. His newspaper, the Bluefield Daily Telegraph, was an unashamedly Republican publication. The radio stations and the television station that would later become part of the company were not organs of opinion.

In 1955 his heirs obtained, by the only special exception ever granted by the Federal Communications Commission, the sole television station in the city, which likewise carried his WHIS initials.

After extended litigation, the United States Supreme Court ordered that no one company could own both the primary AM and FM stations, the only TV station, and the only daily newspaper in the same town. WHIS-TV was sold and the call letters changed to WVVA in 1979. His name lives on in WHIS-AM although it also was later sold, as was the FM station he owned.

== Legacy ==
The Hugh Ike Shott, Jr. Foundation – Shott's youngest son, H.I. Shott, Jr., established a foundation in 1984 with the objective to help improve the social and economic quality of life within the trade area of the Bluefield Daily Telegraph. Shott Jr. was with the newspaper founded by his father for more than 60 years.

Party political offices
Preceded by James E. Jones	Republican Party nominee for U.S. Senator from West Virginia (Class 2); 1936, 1942	Succeeded by Chapman Revercomb
U.S. House of Representatives
Preceded by James F. Strother	Member of the U.S. House of Representatives from West Virginia's 5th congressional district 1929 – 1933	Succeeded by John Kee
U.S. Senate
Preceded by Joseph Rosier	U.S. senator (Class 2) from West Virginia; 1942 – 1943; Served alongside: Harley M. Kilgore	Succeeded by W. Chapman Revercomb
