= WKQB =

- Pocahontas, Virginia; United States
- Broadcast area: Bluefield, Virginia; Bland, Virginia; Bluefield, West Virginia; Princeton, West Virginia
- Frequency: 102.9 MHz
- Branding: Mix 102.9

Programming
- Format: Hot adult contemporary

Ownership
- Owner: Bob Spencer and Rick Lambert; (First Media Services, LLC)
- Sister stations: WKQR, WELC, WAMN, WHAJ, WHKX, WHQX, WKOY-FM, WKEZ, WHIS

History
- First air date: February 1, 1990
- Former call signs: WELC-FM (1989–2011)

Technical information
- Licensing authority: FCC
- Facility ID: 52864
- Class: A
- ERP: 100 watts
- HAAT: 454 meters (1,490 ft)
- Transmitter coordinates: 37°13′12.0″N 81°15′20.0″W

Links
- Public license information: Public file; LMS
- Webcast: Listen live
- Website: mymix1029.com

WKQB (102.9 FM) is a hot adult contemporary formatted broadcast radio station licensed to Pocahontas, Virginia, serving Bluefield and Bland in Virginia and Bluefield and Princeton in West Virginia. WKQB is owned and operated by West Virginia-Virginia Holding Company, LLC.
