= WPJC =

EWTN radio station in Pontiac, Illinois

- Pontiac, Illinois; United States
- Frequency: 88.3 MHz
- Branding: Catholic Spirit Radio

Programming
- Format: Catholic talk
- Affiliations: EWTN Global Catholic Radio

Ownership
- Owner: 2820 Communications, Incorporated
- Sister stations: WSPI, WUON

History
- First air date: 2003

Technical information
- Licensing authority: FCC
- Facility ID: 91342
- Class: B1
- ERP: 20,000 watts
- HAAT: 39 meters (128 ft)
- Transmitter coordinates: 40°53′11″N 88°38′41″W

Links
- Public license information: Public file; LMS
- Webcast: Listen Live
- Website: http://www.catholicspiritradio.com/

WPJC (88.3 FM) is an EWTN-affiliated Catholic talk radio station licensed to Pontiac, Illinois, United States. The station is owned by 2820 Communications, Incorporated, and simulcasts its sister flagship station Catholic Spirit Radio 89.5 WSPI from Normal, IL.

== History ==
The station began broadcasting in 2003, and was owned by CSN International, airing a Christian format. In 2008, CSN International sold WPJC, along with a number of other stations, to Calvary Radio Network, Inc. These stations were sold to Calvary Chapel Costa Mesa later that year. In 2010, Calvary Radio Network purchased WPJC back from Calvary Chapel Costa Mesa.

In 2012, the station was sold to WPRR, Inc. for $80,000, and the station began airing a progressive talk format, simulcasting AM 1680 WPRR in Grand Rapids, Michigan.
