= WJWD =

Marshall, Wisconsin; United States
- Broadcast area: Madison metropolitan area
- Frequency: 90.3 MHz

Programming
- Format: Christian radio
- Affiliations: Calvary Radio Network

Ownership
- Owner: Calvary Radio Network, Inc.
- Sister stations: WHLP, WJCZ, WJCO, WOJC, WJCY, WMJC, WOJC, WQKO, WVWG, WTZI, WTZY

History
- First air date: 2003
- Former call signs

Technical information
- Licensing authority: FCC
- Facility ID: 93445
- Class: B1
- ERP: 9,900 watts (vertical polarization); 55 watts (horizontal polarization)
- HAAT: 95 meters (312 feet)
- Transmitter coordinates: 43°20′40″N 89°06′10″W
- Translator: 101.1 W270AU (Madison)

Links
- Public license information: Public file; LMS
- Webcast: Listen Live
- Website: JesusPeopleFM.com; Calvary Chapel Madison

WJWD (90.3 MHz) is a non-commercial FM radio station licensed to Marshall, Wisconsin and serving the Madison metropolitan area. It is owned by the Calvary Radio Network, an Indiana nonprofit corporation based in Valparaiso, Indiana. WJWD broadcasts that network's lineup of Christian talk and teaching programs with some Contemporary Christian music, mostly modern praise and worship and Christian rock and pop. Calvary Radio is the radio outreach of several non-denominational churches focused on the "inerrancy of the Bible" and the "expository teaching from Genesis to Revelation".

WJWD has an effective radiated power (ERP) of 9,900 watts (vertical polarization) and 55 watts (horizontal polarization). The transmitter is on Route 60 at Zurbruegg Road in Columbus, Wisconsin. In Madison, WJWD can also be heard on 10 watt FM translator W270AU at 101.1 MHz.

== History ==
This station received its original construction permit from the Federal Communications Commission on February 25, 2000. The new station was assigned the call letters WJWD by the FCC on August 1, 2001. WJWD received its license to cover from the FCC on March 19, 2003.

WJWD first signed on in January 2003. In February 2007, the station applied to the FCC for a "main studio waiver" that would allow the station to be operated remotely from outside the broadcast area of the station itself.

Calvary Chapel Costa Mesa sold the station in 2010 to the Calvary Radio Network.

== Programming ==
Some of the station's programs include The Upward Call and Battleground. For The Upward Call, Pastor Jeff Solwold presents the Gospel with line by line, verse by verse Bible teaching that airs weeknights at 6:00 p.m., noon on Saturdays, and 9:30 a.m. on Sundays. Battleground airs live Mondays through Fridays at 10:30 a.m. Central.

Another popular program is Pastor's Perspective, a live call in show that deals with Christian apologetics and questions about the Bible and Christian living. It airs every week night.

The Word For Today, with Pastor Chuck Smith, is broadcast twice a day at 7:30 a.m. and Noon. The Word For Today is a non-profit organization, and an outreach of Calvary Chapel of Costa Mesa. Pastor Chuck Smith's radio and TV programs can be heard on stations nationwide. The program can be heard in over 350 cities worldwide, and airs more than 300 times daily.

WJWD airs the 10:30 a.m. services, live, from Calvary Chapel Madison starting at 10:40 a.m. until noon.

== Translators ==
Call sign	Frequency	City of license	FID	ERP (W)	Class	FCC info
W270AU	(101.9 FM) FM	Madison, Wisconsin	139064	10	D	LMS
