= KWLK =

- Westwood, California; United States
- Broadcast area: Susanville, California
- Frequency: 88.5 MHz
- Branding: The Walk

Programming
- Format: Christian

Ownership
- Owner: Calvary Chapel of Susanville

History
- First air date: 2006
- Former call signs: KJCQ (2006–2013)

Technical information
- Licensing authority: FCC
- Facility ID: 124890
- Class: A
- ERP: 270 watts
- HAAT: 408 meters (1,339 ft)
- Transmitter coordinates: 40°20′14.5″N 120°52′11.1″W

Links
- Public license information: Public file; LMS
- Webcast: Listen live
- Website: kwlkradio.com

KWLK (88.5 FM) is a radio station licensed to Westwood, California, United States. The station is currently owned by Calvary Chapel of Susanville.

== History ==
The station began broadcasting in 2006 and was owned by CSN International. It was originally licensed to Quincy, California and held the call sign KJCQ. In 2008, CSN International sold KJCQ, along with a number of other stations, to Calvary Radio Network, Inc. These stations were sold to Calvary Chapel Costa Mesa later that year. In 2010, Calvary Chapel Costa Mesa sold KJCQ, along with KJCU and two translators, to Living Proof, Inc. for $100,000. In 2013, the station was sold to Calvary Chapel of Susanville for $50,000, and its call sign was changed to KWLK.
