= WVRL =

- Elizabeth City, North Carolina; United States
- Broadcast area: Elizabeth City/Nags Head
- Frequency: 88.3 MHz
- Branding: The Journey

Programming
- Format: Contemporary Christian

Ownership
- Owner: Liberty University, Inc.

History
- First air date: 2003 (as WGPS)
- Former call signs: WGPS (2003–2010)

Technical information
- Licensing authority: FCC
- Facility ID: 86560
- Class: C2
- ERP: 50,000 watts
- HAAT: 136 meters (446 ft)
- Transmitter coordinates: 36°18′40.00″N 76°17′34.00″W

Links
- Public license information: Public file; LMS
- Webcast: Listen Live
- Website: www.myjourneyfm.com

WVRL (88.3 FM) is a radio station broadcasting a Contemporary Christian format. Licensed to Elizabeth City, North Carolina, United States, the station serves the Roanoke Rapids area. The station signed on in February 2003. The station is currently owned by Liberty University, Inc., and is part of Liberty's network of CCM stations branded as "The Journey" that rebroadcast WRVL in Lynchburg, VA.

== History ==
The station began broadcasting in 2003, and held the call sign WGPS. It was owned by CSN International and aired a Christian format. In 2008, CSN International sold WGPS, along with a number of other stations, to Calvary Radio Network, Inc. These stations were sold to Calvary Chapel Costa Mesa later that year. In 2010, Calvary Chapel Costa Mesa sold WGPS and several other stations to Liberty University for $1.25 million, and the station's call sign was changed to WVRL.

== Translators ==
In addition to the main station, WVRL is relayed by an additional translator to widen its broadcast area.

Broadcast translator for WVRL
Call sign	Frequency	City of license	FID	ERP (W)	Class	FCC info
W252CB	98.3 FM	Virginia Beach, Virginia	155042	250	D	LMS
