= First Community Bancshares =

American bank holding company

First Community Bankshares, Inc.
- Company type: Public
- Traded as: Nasdaq: FCBC; Russell 2000 Component
- Industry: Holding company; Banking
- Headquarters: Bluefield, Virginia, United States
- Subsidiaries: First Community Bank
- Website: fcbresource.com

First Community Bankshares, Inc. is a $2.43 billion bank holding company and the parent company of First Community Bank of Bluefield, Virginia, in the United States. As of 2012 First Community Bank had 45 locations in Virginia, West Virginia, and North Carolina, and two locations operating as Peoples Community Bank in Tennessee. As of April 21, 2023, First Community had $3.6 billion in assets.

First Community Bank also offers wealth management and investment services through its wholly owned subsidiary First Community Wealth Management and the bank's Trust Division, which collectively managed $906 million in combined assets as of March 31, 2017. First Community Bancshares also offers insurance products under the First Community Insurance Services.

== History ==
Princeton Bank & Trust Co. in Princeton, West Virginia, began in 1874. The bank changed its name to First Community Bank of Princeton in March 1985.

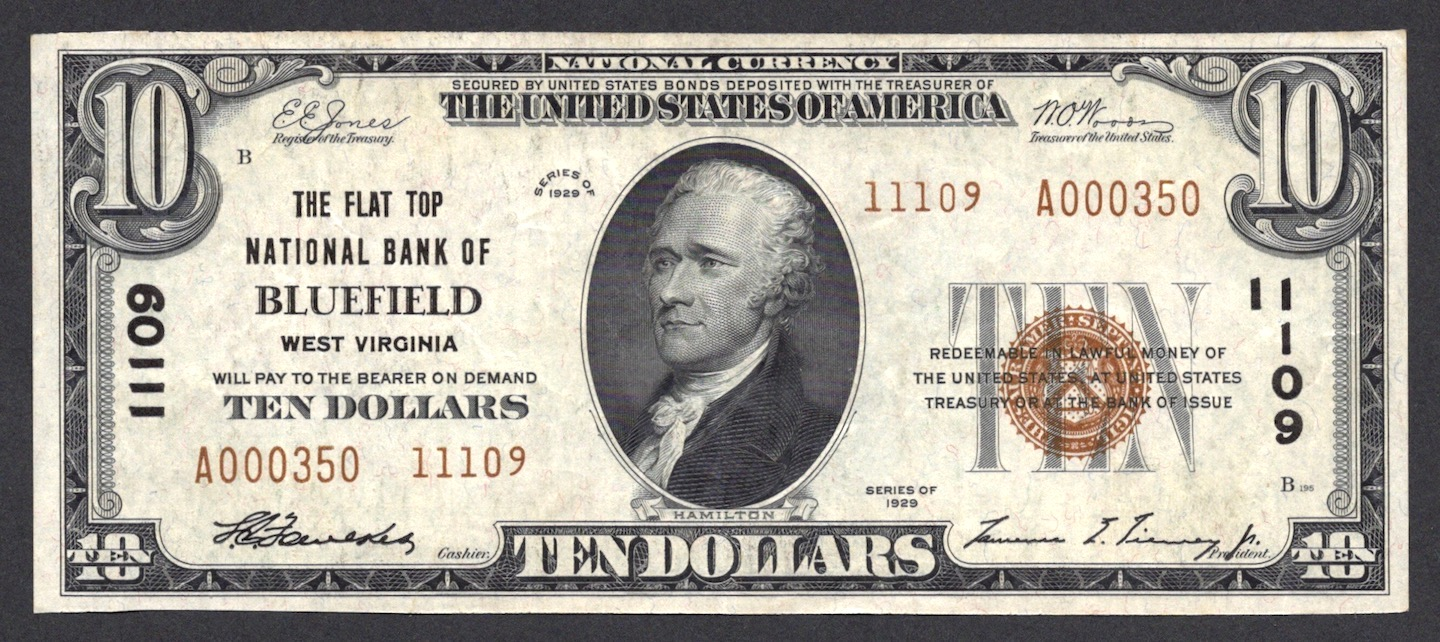
A National Bank Note issued by the Flat Top National Bank of Bluefield

Flat Top National Bank of Bluefield, West Virginia, was chartered in 1903 and consolidated with Bluefield National Bank May 2, 1932. Shareholders approved a plan to reorganize November 4, 1982, making the bank a subsidiary of Flat Top Bankshares, Inc.

First Community Bankshares incorporated in Delaware November 7, 1989. In a merger of equals, First Community and Flat Top joined May 9, 1990.

On January 29, 1993, First Community bought People's Bank of Richmond for $250,000. On July 3, 1996, in a deal worth about $8.9 million, First Community bought Citizens Bank of Tazewell, headquartered in Tazewell, Virginia. On April 9, 1997, First Community took over Blue Ridge Bank of Sparta, North Carolina for about $24.6 million.

On September 28, 1999, First Community Bank bought United First Mortgage.

On November 1, 2000, First Community bought Citizens Southern Bank of Beckley, West Virginia, which started in 1995 and had $65 million in assets, for $6.5 million. First Community was the third-largest banking company headquartered in Virginia, and it had 33 branches in Virginia, West Virginia, and North Carolina, while two-thirds of its operations were in West Virginia.

In 2001, First Community had $1.29 billion in assets and a mortgage subsidiary based in Richmond. It then bought branches in Clifton Forge, Virginia, Emporia, Virginia, and Drakes Branch, Virginia. This gave the bank a presence in the eastern part of the state.

In 2003, First Community completed its $26.6 million takeover of CommonWealth Bank of Richmond, with four branches, $148.7 million in assets and $111.1 million in deposits. Along with two branches opening in June 2003 in Winston-Salem, North Carolina, the deal gave First Community Bank 46 branches in Virginia, West Virginia and North Carolina. First Community Bancshares president and CEO John M. Mendez said Charlottesville, Hampton Roads and possibly Roanoke were other markets in which the bank planned growth.

With $1.6 billion in assets as of September 30, 2003, after the BB&T purchase of First Virginia Banks, First Community Bancshares was the largest Virginia-based bank holding company.

As of April 1, 2004, First Community Bank acquired People's Community Bank of Johnson City, Tennessee, which was a subsidiary of PCB Bancorp, Inc.

In 2004, First Community sold its mortgage subsidiary to Access National Bank.

In 2006, First Community was the largest community bank in North Carolina's Piedmont Triad. The bank had three branches in Winston-Salem and planned one more branch there and one in Clemmons, with a Kernersville loan office becoming a branch. FirstCommunity had $1.95 billion in assets.

In 2009, First Community completed a $10.5 million deal for TriStone Community Bank, increasing the number of Forsyth County branches from four to six. TriStone chief executive Simpson "Skip" Brown Jr. became the First Community Piedmont Triad regional president, and the bank's North Carolina headquarters moved to the former TriStone branch on Jonestown Road.

On March 1, 2012, it was announced that First Community would purchase Richmond-based Peoples Bank of Virginia, with four branches and $286 million in assets, in a $40.6 million deal.

On June 8, 2012, Whiteville, North Carolina–based Waccamaw Bank, which had three branches in Myrtle Beach, South Carolina, failed, reopening as First Community Bank on June 11 after a deal with the FDIC. Waccamaw had operated for 14 years and had 16 branches in all, with $533.1 million in assets and $472.7 million in deposits.

In 2014, First Community announced it would buy Bank of America branches with $440 million in deposits located in Abingdon, Blacksburg, Gate City, Hillsville, Pulaski and Wytheville in Virginia and Mount Airy in North Carolina.

On December 15, 2014, 13 branches of First Community began operating as CresCom Bank after the Carolina Financial Corp. subsidiary completed a $7 million purchase. The branches, with $230 million in deposits, included six in Brunswick County, North Carolina, four others in North Carolina, and three in South Carolina.

On March 4, 2016, First Community and First Bancorp announced a deal in which First Community would sell all three of its branches in Winston-Salem, and one each in Huntersville, North Carolina, and Mooresville, North Carolina, to First Bancorp. Deposits at these branches totaled $130 million. First Bancorp would sell seven Virginia branches to First Community. With deposits totaling $150 million, these were located in Abingdon, Blacksburg, Christiansburg, Fort Chiswell, Radford, Salem and Wytheville.

In 2019 it was announced that First Community Bank and Highlands Union Bank were to merge. As a result all fifteen existing Highlands Union Bank locations were renamed to First Community Bank and continued operations under the new name. Highlands Union Bank had total assets of about $612 million as of June 30, 2019.

On November 18, 2022, Surrey Bancorp of Mount Airy, North Carolina, announced a $113.2 million deal with First Community Bank expected to be completed in the second quarter of 2023. The deal was completed April 21, 2023 and the six branches opened as First Community branches April 24, giving the bank 11 North Carolina locations. Total assets increased $482 million.
