= WKEZ (AM) =

Radio station in Bluefield, West Virginia

- Bluefield, West Virginia; United States
- Broadcast area: Bluefield, West Virginia; Bluefield, Virginia
- Frequency: 1240 kHz
- Branding: 98.7 KEZ

Programming
- Format: Soft adult contemporary
- Affiliations: Local Radio Networks

Ownership
- Owner: Charles Spencer and Rick Lambert; (First Media Services, LLC)
- Sister stations: WHAJ, WHIS, WHKX, WHQX, WKOY-FM, WELC, WAMN, WKQR, WKQB

History
- First air date: 1948

Technical information
- Licensing authority: FCC
- Facility ID: 44001
- Class: C
- Power: 1,000 watts unlimited
- Transmitter coordinates: 37°15′57.0″N 81°11′20.0″W
- Translator: 98.7 W254CV (Bluefield)
- Repeater: 1150 WELC (Welch)

Links
- Public license information: Public file; LMS
- Webcast: Listen Live
- Website: www.myezradio.com

WKEZ (1240 kHz, "98.7 KEZ") is an AM radio station licensed to Bluefield, West Virginia. Owned by Charles Spencer and Rick Lambert, through licensee First Media Services, LLC, it broadcasts a soft adult contemporary format.

== History ==
On September 14, 2016, WKEZ changed their format from classic country to classic hip hop, branded as "G98.7", simulcasting on FM translator W254CV 98.7 FM Bluefield.

Alpha Media sold its Bluefield cluster to First Media Services in September 2018. In December 2018, WKEZ rebranded as "Z98.7", with no change in format.

In November 2019, WKEZ began stunting with Christmas music as "Christmas 98.7". At midnight on January 1, 2020, the station flipped to soft adult contemporary as "98.7 EZ-FM". The new format is also simulcast by WELC 1150 AM Welch.
