= West Virginia's 5th congressional district =

1903–1973 US congressional district

- Obsolete district
- Created: 1900
- Eliminated: 1970
- Years active: 1903-1973

West Virginia's 5th congressional district is an obsolete district existing from 1903 to 1973. While the district's bounds were changed over the years, for most of its existence it was focused on Bluefield and the coal producing southwestern part of the state. For the last 40 years of its existence, it was held by the Kee family. In the 1970 redistricting, most of the district was combined with the 4th district. As of 2023, the state has two districts, the 1st covering the southern half of the state and the 2nd covering the northern half.

== History ==
The 5th district was formed in 1902. It was originally formed of Mason, Putnam, Cabell, Lincoln, Wayne, Boone, Lincoln, Mingo, Raleigh, Wyoming, McDowell, and Mercer counties. It was revised in 1916 to consist of Wayne, Lincoln, Mingo, Logan, McDowell, Wyoming, Mercer, Summers, and Monroe counties. In 1934, Wayne, Lincoln, and Logan were removed and Greenbrier was added. It was unchanged for 1952. In 1962, Greenbrier was removed and Fayette was added. The district was abolished in the 1972 redistricting.

== List of representatives ==
Representative	Party	Dates	Cong ress	Electoral history
District established March 4, 1903
James A. Hughes (Huntington)	Republican	March 4, 1903 – March 3, 1915	58th 59th 60th 61st 62nd 63rd	Redistricted from the 4th district and re-elected in 1902. Re-elected in 1904. Re-elected in 1906. Re-elected in 1908. Re-elected in 1910. Re-elected in 1912. Retired.
Edward Cooper (Bramwell)	Republican	March 4, 1915 – March 3, 1919	64th 65th	Elected in 1914. Re-elected in 1916. Lost renomination.
Wells Goodykoontz (Williamson)	Republican	March 4, 1919 – March 3, 1923	66th 67th	Elected in 1918. Re-elected in 1920. Lost re-election.
Thomas J. Lilly (Hinton)	Democratic	March 4, 1923 – March 3, 1925	68th	Elected in 1922. Lost re-election.
James F. Strother (Welch)	Republican	March 4, 1925 – March 3, 1929	69th 70th	Elected in 1924. Re-elected in 1926. Retired.
Hugh I. Shott (Bluefield)	Republican	March 4, 1929 – March 3, 1933	71st 72nd	Elected in 1928. Re-elected in 1930. Lost re-election.
John Kee (Bluefield)	Democratic	March 4, 1933 – May 8, 1951	73rd 74th 75th 76th 77th 78th 79th 80th 81st 82nd	Elected in 1932. Re-elected in 1934. Re-elected in 1936. Re-elected in 1938. Re-elected in 1940. Re-elected in 1942. Re-elected in 1944. Re-elected in 1946. Re-elected in 1948. Re-elected in 1950. Died.
Vacant		May 8, 1951 – July 17, 1951	82nd	
Elizabeth Kee (Bluefield)	Democratic	July 17, 1951 – January 3, 1965	82nd 83rd 84th 85th 86th 87th 88th	Elected to finish her husband's term. Re-elected in 1952. Re-elected in 1954. Re-elected in 1956. Re-elected in 1958. Re-elected in 1960. Re-elected in 1962. Retired.
James Kee (Bluefield)	Democratic	January 3, 1965 – January 3, 1973	89th 90th 91st 92nd	Elected in 1964. Re-elected in 1966. Re-elected in 1968. Re-elected in 1970. Redistricted to the 4th district and lost renomination.
District dissolved January 3, 1973
