= WKQR =

- Mullens, West Virginia; United States
- Broadcast area: Southern West Virginia
- Frequency: 92.7 kHz
- Branding: 92.7 The Mix

Programming
- Format: Variety hits

Ownership
- Owner: Bob Spencer and Rick Lambert; (First Media Services, LLC)
- Sister stations: WKQB, WELC, WAMN, WKEZ, WKOY-FM, WHKX, WHQX, WHAJ, WHIS

History
- First air date: September 30, 1981
- Former call signs: WPMW (1981–2008); WVJO (2008–2011)

Technical information
- Licensing authority: FCC
- Facility ID: 60598
- Class: A
- ERP: 6,000 watts
- HAAT: 100 meters (328 feet)
- Transmitter coordinates: 37°31′07″N 81°22′43″W

Links
- Public license information: Public file; LMS
- Website: Official Website

WKQR (92.7 FM) - branded as 92.7 The Mix - is an American radio station licensed to serve the community of Mullens, West Virginia. The station, established in 1981, is owned by Bob Spencer and Rick Lambert, through licensee First Media Services, LLC.

== Programming ==
From May 2011 to January 2019, WKQR has aired a contemporary hit radio music format branded as "92.7 and 102.9 Kiss FM" in conjunction with sister station WKQB (102.9 FM) in Pocahontas, Virginia. Notable weekday programming includes the syndicated The Ace & TJ Show morning show.

== History ==
=== Early years (1981–2011) ===
In 1979, Slab Fork Broadcasting Company applied to the Federal Communications Commission (FCC) for a construction permit for a new broadcast radio station. The FCC granted this permit on March 9, 1981, with a scheduled expiration date of March 9, 1982. The new station was assigned call sign "WPMW" on July 24, 1981. The station began broadcasting under program test authority on September 20, 1981. After construction and testing were completed, the station was granted its broadcast license on May 26, 1983.

In October 1997, Slab Fork Broadcasting Company, L.P., agreed to sell WPMW to Castle Rock Investments, LLC. The FCC approved the sale on December 31, 1997, and the transaction was consummated on January 9, 1998.

In September 2005, Castle Rock Investments, LLC, contracted to sell WPMW to West Virginia-Virginia Holding Company, LLC, for $120,000. The deal gained FCC approval on December 29, 2005, and the formal consummation of the deal took place on March 29, 2006. At the time of the sale, the station was playing a classic rock music format branded as "C-92". The new owners had the FCC change the station's call sign to "WVJO" on May 2, 2008. This change was made to match the "Joe FM" branding of the station's adult hits format.

=== Kiss FM 92.7/102.9 (2011–2019) ===
On May 19, 2011, WVJO changed their call sign to WKQR. On May 24, 2011, WKQR changed their format from adult hits to CHR/Top 40, branded as "92.7 and 102.9 Kiss FM" and began simulcasting on sister station WKQB. On June 20, 2011, WKQR added the syndicated The Ace & TJ Show morning show.

=== 92.7 The Mix ===
On January 16, 2019, WKQR changed their format from contemporary hit radio back to variety hits, branded as "92.7 The Mix".
