= Elizabeth Kee =

American politician (1895–1975)

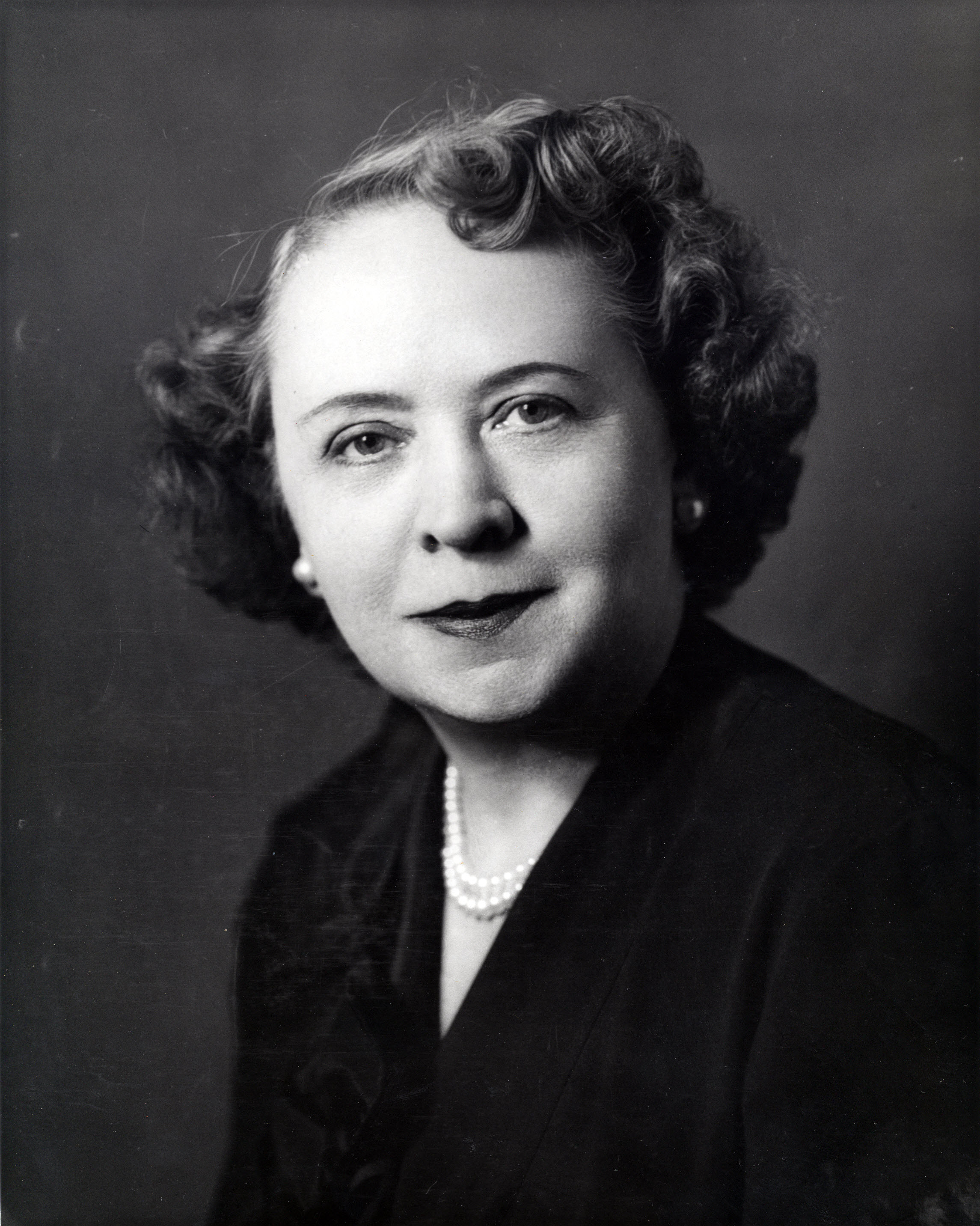

Member of the U.S. House of Representatives from West Virginia's 5th district
- In office July 17, 1951 – January 3, 1965
- Preceded by: John Kee
- Succeeded by: James Kee

Personal details
- Born: Maude Elizabeth Simpkins; June 7, 1895 Radford, Virginia
- Died: February 15, 1975 (aged 79) Bluefield, West Virginia
- Party: Democratic
- Spouse(s): Alan Frazier; John Kee
- Children: James Kee[Frances Kee]
- Education: National Business College, Roanoke, Virginia

Maude Elizabeth Kee (née Simpkins; June 7, 1895 – February 15, 1975), known generally as Elizabeth Kee, was a U.S. Democratic politician. She was the first woman elected to the U.S. House of Representatives from West Virginia, serving from 1951 to 1965. Kee specialized in veterans' and unemployment issues during her congressional career.

While serving in Congress, Kee followed the liberal-progressive pattern of her late husband.

== Biography ==
Maude Elizabeth Kee was born Maude Elizabeth Simpkins in Radford, Virginia, in 1895. She was one of 11 children of John Jesse Wade Simpkins and Cora French Hall Simpkins. Both of her parents held strong conservative views, which she began to challenge at a young age. She rejected her parents' strict Baptist faith, converting to Catholicism. After moving with her family to Roanoke, Virginia, she attended the National Business College there. Around 1916, Lee worked as secretary for the Roanoke Times business office, and later worked as a court reporter for a local law firm.

After a failed first marriage to a railway clerk, James Alan Frazier, she married John Kee, who had been Frazier's attorney in his divorce from Elizabeth. She, Kee, and her two children from her previous marriage moved to Bluefield, West Virginia. John Kee was first elected to Congress from the Fifth Congressional District in 1932, and Elizabeth Kee served as her husband's executive secretary until his death in 1951. She won a special election to succeed him for the rest of the term, then went on to be elected to six full terms and served from July 17, 1951, to January 3, 1965, in the 82nd through the 88th U.S. Congresses.

In Congress, Kee served on the House Government Operations, Interior and Insular Affairs, and Veterans Affairs committees, chairing the last's Veterans' Hospitals Subcommittee. After struggling to win support for economic redevelopment plans for her home district in West Virginia during the Eisenhower Administration, Kee supported John F. Kennedy's successful campaign in 1960 and, through the Accelerated Public Works Act, funneled millions of dollars to the state through an Area Redevelopment Administration. She did not sign the 1956 Southern Manifesto and voted in favor of the Civil Rights Acts of 1957 and 1960, as well as the 24th Amendment to the U.S. Constitution, but voted present on the Civil Rights Act of 1964. Kee did not seek re-election in 1964, and was succeeded in Congress by her son, James Kee. She retired to Bluefield, West Virginia, where she died in 1975.

The Elizabeth Kee Federal Building in Bluefield, WV is named in her honor.

== See also ==
- West Virginia's congressional delegations
- Women in the United States House of Representatives

U.S. House of Representatives
| Preceded by John Kee | Member of the U.S. House of Representatives from West Virginia's 5th congressional district 1951–1965 | Succeeded by James Kee |
