= Calvary Radio Network =

American Christian radio network

- Type: Radio network
- Country: United States
- Branding: Calvary Radio

Ownership
- Owner: Calvary Radio Network, Inc.

Links
- Webcast: Listen Live
- Website: www.jesuspeoplefm.com

Calvary Radio Network is a network of Christian radio stations in the Midwestern United States, broadcasting Christian talk and teaching programs as well as contemporary Christian music. The network is based in Valparaiso, Indiana.

== History ==
In 2008, Calvary Radio Network purchased 26 full powered stations, 27 translators, and one construction permit from CSN International. These stations were sold to Calvary Chapel Costa Mesa later that year. The network purchased 11 full powered stations and 20 translators back from Calvary Chapel Costa Mesa in 2010.

In 2021, Calvary Radio Network sold WCJL (90.9 FM) at Morgantown to the Educational Media Foundation for $250,000; it is now WBKC. WMJC, WVWG, and WTZI, were also sold in 2021 and 2022.

== Stations ==
Calvary Radio Network is heard on 9 stations in Illinois, Indiana, and Wisconsin, as well as 8 translators.

=== Stations ===
Call sign	Frequency	City of license	State	Facility ID	Class	ERP W	Height m (ft)
WJCZ	91.3 FM	Milford	Illinois	122006	B1	25,000	27.0 m (88.6 ft)
WTZY	91.3 FM	Wonder Lake	Illinois	174052	A	4,000	65.0 m (213.3 ft)
WJCY	91.5 FM	Cicero	Indiana	122004	A	475	59.0 m (193.6 ft)
WOJC	89.7 FM	Crothersville	Indiana	93802	A	3,700	73 m (240 ft)
WHLP	89.9 FM	Hanna	Indiana	91345	B1	8,000	154.0 m (505.2 ft)
WQKO	91.9 FM	Howe	Indiana	39886	A	1,600	132.0 m (433.1 ft)
WJCI	102.9 FM	Huntington	Indiana	28206	A	4,700	91.0 m (298.6 ft)
WJCO	91.3 FM	Montpelier	Indiana	122009	A	350	59.8 m (196 ft)
WJWD	90.3 FM	Marshall	Wisconsin	93445	B1	9,900	95.0 m (311.7 ft)

=== Translators ===
Call sign	Frequency (MHz)	City of license	State	Facility ID	ERP (W)	Height (m (ft))
W264BF	100.7	Chicago	Illinois	140680	6	442.2 m (1,451 ft)
W255BH	98.9	Bremen	Indiana	157049	13	117.6 m (386 ft)
W265CP	100.9	Buffalo	Indiana	140809	27	86.4 m (283 ft)
W240BJ	95.9	Crown Point	Indiana	140647	10	160 m (520 ft)
W232DV	94.3	Lafayette	Indiana	140803	250	28 m (92 ft)
W300AL	107.9	Mishawaka	Indiana	81894	10	194 m (636 ft)
W223AU	92.5	South Bend	Indiana	140817	10	194 m (636 ft)
W254BG	98.7	Warsaw	Indiana	157053	27	73.1 m (240 ft)
W270AU	101.9	Madison	Wisconsin	139064	10	136.7 m (448 ft)

=== Former Calvary Radio Network stations ===
Call sign	Frequency	City of license	State	Notes
KJCU	89.9 FM	Fort Bragg	California	Sold in 2008
KJCQ	88.5 FM	Westwood	California	Sold in 2008
KYMS	89.9 FM	Rathdrum	Idaho	Sold in 2008
WPJC	88.3 FM	Pontiac	Illinois	Sold in 2012
WTZI	88.1 FM	Rosemont	Illinois	Sold in 2022
WTMK	88.5 FM	Lowell	Indiana	Sold in 2010
WCJL	90.9 FM	Morgantown	Indiana	Sold in 2021
WVWG	88.9 FM	Seelyville	Indiana	Sold in 2021
KIHS	88.5 FM	Adel	Iowa	Sold in 2012
WJCX	99.5 FM	Pittsfield	Maine	Sold in 2008
WFGL	960 AM	Fitchburg	Massachusetts	Sold in 2008
WJWT	91.7 FM	Gardner	Massachusetts	Sold in 2008
WMJC	91.9 FM	Richland	Michigan	Sold in 2021
KYWH	88.9 FM	Lockwood	Montana	Sold in 2008
WWFP	90.5 FM	Brigantine	New Jersey	Sold in 2008
KKCJ	90.7 FM	Cannon Air Force Base	New Mexico	Sold in 2008
KPKJ	88.5 FM	Mentmore	New Mexico	Sold in 2008
WGPS	88.3 FM	Elizabeth City	North Carolina	Sold in 2008
WJIJ	94.3 FM	Norlina	North Carolina	Sold in 2008
WPGT	91.1 FM	Roanoke Rapids	North Carolina	Sold in 2008
WAJC	90.5 FM	Zebulon	North Carolina	Sold in 2008
KAJC	90.1 FM	Salem	Oregon	Sold in 2008
