= KMHI =

Radio station in Mountain Home, Idaho

- Mountain Home, Idaho; United States
- Broadcast area: Boise, Idaho
- Frequency: 1240 kHz

Programming
- Format: Christian radio

Ownership
- Owner: CSN International

History
- First air date: March 20, 1962 (as KFLI)
- Former call signs: KFLI (1962–1983); KJCY (1983–1989); KLVJ (1989–1997)

Technical information
- Licensing authority: FCC
- Facility ID: 72657
- Class: C
- Power: 1,000 watts
- Transmitter coordinates: 43°9′3″N 115°42′26″W

Links
- Public license information: Public file; LMS
- Website: csnradio.com

KMHI (1240 AM) is a radio station that is licensed to Mountain Home, Idaho, United States, and serves the Boise area. The station is owned by CSN International and broadcasts a Christian radio format.

== History ==
The station first signed on March 20, 1962, as KFLI; it was originally owned by Northwest Broadcasters Inc., headed by Clyde M. Degler. In 1983, Mountain Valley Broadcasting purchased KFLI, which aired a country music format in the 1980s. On October 12, 1983, the station changed its call sign to KJCY, then to KLVJ on January 1, 1989.

In August 1992, Media Venture Management Inc., led by Randolph George, sold KLVJ and its FM counterpart KLVJ-FM to William Konopnicki for $78,000. Both stations were silent at the time of the sale. In April 1995, Konopnicki sold the combo to station manager Jack Jensen, doing business as Valley Mountain Broadcasting Inc., for $310,000; the AM station aired a news/talk format.

In November 1996, Jensen sold KLVJ-AM-FM to Wendell Starke's FM Idaho Company for $475,500. FM Idaho changed the FM station's call letters to KMHI on January 7, 1997. In May 2013, FM Idaho donated KMHI, which at the time was broadcasting a classic country music format, to Calvary Chapel of Twin Falls, Inc.
