= WCBX =

- Bassett, Virginia; United States
- Broadcast area: Martinsville, Virginia; Henry County, Virginia
- Frequency: 900 kHz
- Branding: CSN Radio

Programming
- Format: Conservative Religious
- Network: CSN International

Ownership
- Owner: CSN International

History
- First air date: October 1, 1960
- Former call signs: WODY (?-1993)

Technical information
- Licensing authority: FCC
- Facility ID: 18887
- Class: D
- Power: 1,100 watts (day); 180 watts (night)
- Transmitter coordinates: 36°42′36.0″N 79°57′58.0″W

Links
- Public license information: Public file; LMS
- Webcast: WCBX Webstream
- Website: WCBX Online

WCBX is a Conservative Religious formatted broadcast radio station licensed to Bassett, Virginia, serving Martinsville and Henry County, Virginia. WCBX is owned and operated by CSN International.
