= James Kee =

American politician (1917–1989)

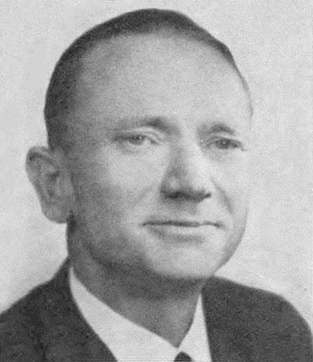

Member of the U.S. House of Representatives from West Virginia's 5th district
- In office January 3, 1965 – January 3, 1973
- Preceded by: Elizabeth Kee
- Succeeded by: Ken Hechler (Redistricting)

Personal details
- Born: April 15, 1917 Bluefield, West Virginia, U.S.
- Died: March 11, 1989 (aged 71) Montgomery, West Virginia, U.S.
- Party: Democratic
- Spouse: Helen Lee Chapman
- Parent(s): John Kee; Elizabeth Simpkins
- Education: Georgetown University

James Kee (April 15, 1917 – March 11, 1989) was an American politician. A member of the Democratic Party, he served in the United States House of Representatives for West Virginia's 5th congressional district from 1965 to 1973, succeeding his mother Elizabeth Kee. His father John Kee served in the same House seat from 1933 to 1951.

== Life and career ==
Kee was born in Bluefield, West Virginia. He was the son of John Kee, who represented the Bluefield-based 5th District from 1933 until his death in 1951, and Elizabeth Kee, who succeeded her husband in Congress and served from 1951 until 1965. James Kee served as his mother's administrative assistant from 1953 to 1965. When his mother decided not to run for re-election in 1964, he ran for his mother's old seat and won, serving in the 89th through the 92nd U.S. Congress from January 3, 1965, to January 3, 1973. Kee voted in favor of the Voting Rights Act of 1965 and Civil Rights Act of 1968.

After West Virginia lost a seat in the House of Representatives as a result of the 1970 U.S. census, Kee's 5th District was merged with the Huntington-based 4th District, represented by fellow Democrat Ken Hechler. The state legislature intended to force Hechler, a firm opponent of the Democratic Party machine, out of office; indeed, the new district contained 65% of Kee's former territory even though it retained Hechler's district number. However, Hechler made the most of his strong union ties and routed Kee in the primary.

Kee was a resident of Fayetteville, West Virginia, until his death in Montgomery, West Virginia, on March 11, 1989, at the age of 71.

== See also ==
- West Virginia's congressional delegations

U.S. House of Representatives
Preceded by Elizabeth Kee	Member of the U.S. House of Representatives from West Virginia's 5th congressional district 1965–1973	District eliminated
