= KJCB (FM) =

Radio station in Lockwood–Billings, Montana

- Lockwood, Montana; United States
- Broadcast area: Billings Metropolitan Area
- Frequency: 88.9 MHz

Programming
- Format: Christian radio

Ownership
- Owner: CSN International, Inc.

History
- First air date: 2006
- Former call signs: KYWH (2003–2022)

Technical information
- Licensing authority: FCC
- Facility ID: 93512
- Class: A
- ERP: 1,900 watts
- HAAT: 137.7 meters (452 ft)
- Transmitter coordinates: 45°51′12″N 108°45′50″W
- Translator: 107.1 K296EM (Billings)

Links
- Public license information: Public file; LMS
- Webcast: Listen live
- Website: csnradio.com

KJCB (88.9 FM) is a radio station broadcasting a Christian radio format. Licensed to Lockwood, Montana, United States, the station serves the Billings area. The station is currently owned by CSN International, Inc.

== History ==
The station began broadcasting in 2006 as KYWH, and was owned by CSN International, airing a Christian format. In 2008, CSN International sold KYWH, along with a number of other stations, to Calvary Radio Network, Inc. These stations were sold to Calvary Chapel Costa Mesa later that year. In 2011, the station was sold to Fresh Life Church for $100,000.

On May 5, 2021, KYWH changed its format from Christian to adult album alternative, branded as "The River". While the station was still owned by Fresh Life Church, KYWH's operations were later managed by Mike Summers of Wasatch Community Media, who founded and/or programmed several alternative music stations in Salt Lake City (95.5 KJQN, KXRK X96, 107.9 later 101.9 KENZ The End, 91.9 KPCW and 107.9 KUMT The Mountain).

On August 10, 2022, the station changed its call sign to KJCB. Effective June 22, 2023, Fresh Life Church sold KJCB and translator K296EM back to CSN International for $70,000.
