= John Kee =

American politician (1874–1951)

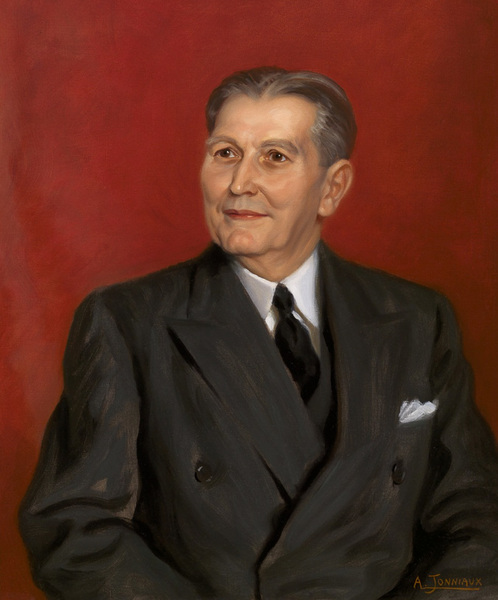

Member of the U.S. House of Representatives from West Virginia's 5th district
- In office March 4, 1933 – May 8, 1951
- Preceded by: Hugh Ike Shott
- Succeeded by: Elizabeth Kee

Chairman of the House Committee on Foreign Affairs
- In office March 7, 1949 – January 3, 1951
- Preceded by: Sol Bloom
- Succeeded by: James P. Richards

Member of the West Virginia Senate from the 7th district
- In office December 1, 1922 – December 1, 1926
- Preceded by: Joseph M. Sanders
- Succeeded by: T. H. Lilly

Personal details
- Born: August 22, 1874 Glenville, West Virginia, U.S.
- Died: May 8, 1951 (aged 76) Washington, D.C., U.S.
- Party: Democratic
- Spouse: Elizabeth Simpkins (m. 1926)
- Children: 2, including James
- Education: Glenville State Normal School; West Virginia University

John Kee (August 22, 1874 – May 8, 1951) was an American politician. A member of the Democratic Party, he served in the United States House of Representatives from 1933 until his death in Washington, D.C., in 1951.

== Biography ==
He was born in Glenville, West Virginia. He attended Glenville State Normal School and West Virginia University, where he was a member of Phi Sigma Kappa, and was admitted to the bar in 1897. Kee was a member of the West Virginia Senate 1923–1927 He was elected as a Democrat to the United States House of Representatives from West Virginia and served from March 4, 1933, until his death, serving the Fifth Congressional District of West Virginia in the 73rd through the 82nd U.S. Congress. He was chairman of the House Committee on Foreign Affairs in the Eighty-first and Eighty-second Congresses.

A confidential 1943 analysis of the House Foreign Affairs Committee by Isaiah Berlin for the British Foreign Office stated that

Judge Kee has been in the House for ten years, and, while he has voted steadily for all the President's foreign policies, he is not either a forceful, influential or noticeably active member of the committee.

Kee died of a heart attack in Washington, D.C., on May 8, 1951. His wife, Elizabeth Kee, succeeded him as U.S. Representative after winning a special election to replace him. She served until 1965 when she was succeeded by their son, James Kee, who served until 1973 when the 5th district was abolished.

== See also ==
- West Virginia's congressional delegations
- List of members of the United States Congress who died in office (1950–1999)

== Sources ==
- United States Congress. "John Kee (id: K000039)". Biographical Directory of the United States Congress.
- John Kee at The Political Graveyard
- Memorial services held in the House of Representatives together with remarks presented in eulogy of John Kee, late a representative from West Virginia

U.S. House of Representatives
Preceded by Hugh Ike Shott	Member of the U.S. House of Representatives from West Virginia's 5th congressional district 1933–1951	Succeeded by Elizabeth Kee
Political offices
Preceded by Sol Bloom	Chairman of the House Foreign Affairs Committee; 1949 – 1951	Succeeded by James P. Richards
