= First Bancorp =

American bank based in North Carolina

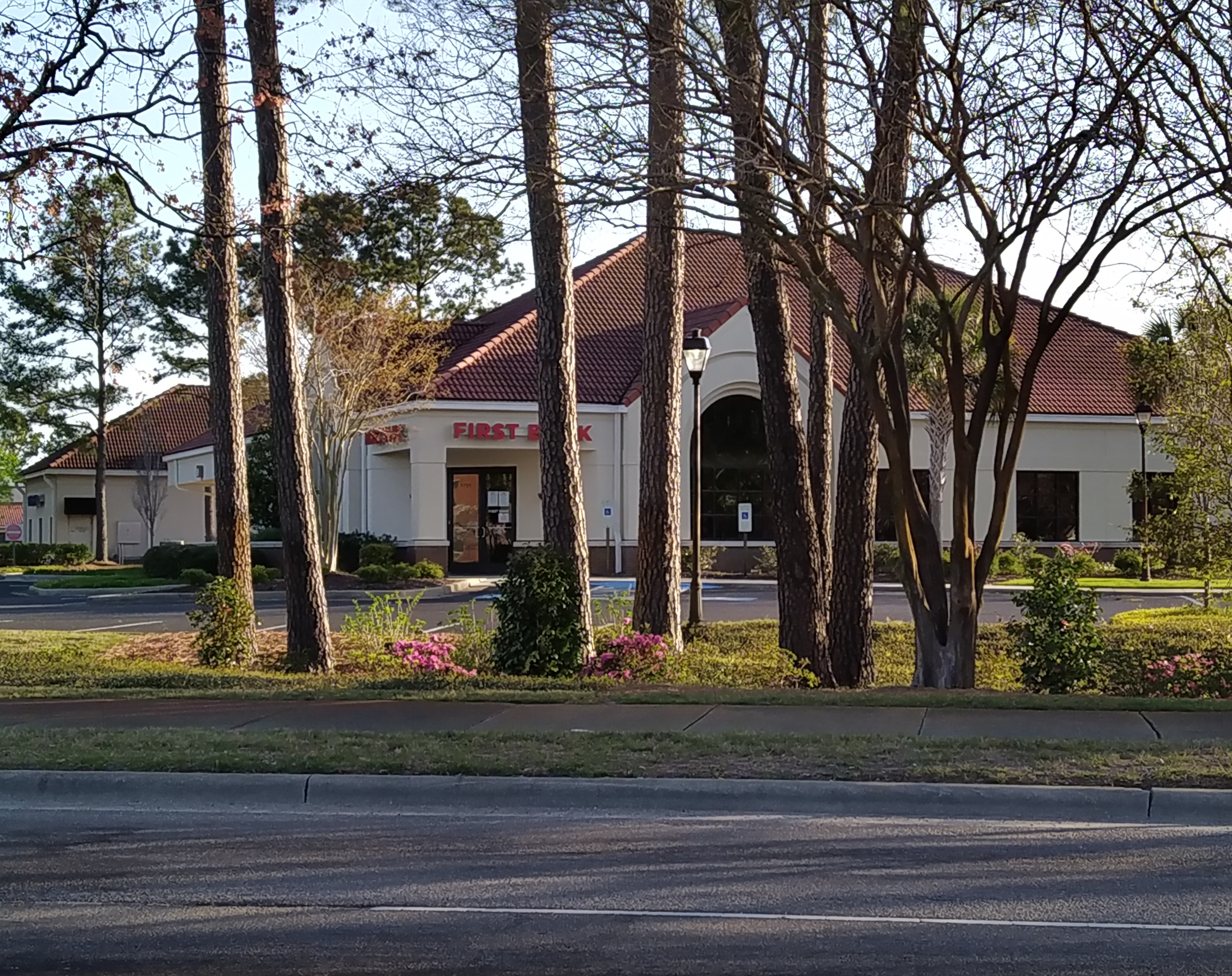
- First Bank branch located in the Landfall neighborhood in southeast Wilmington
- Type: Public
- Traded as: Nasdaq: FBNC; Russell 2000 Index component S&P 600 component
- Industry: Financial services
- Founded: 1935; 91 years ago
- Headquarters: Southern Pines, North Carolina, United States
- Products: Banking services
- Subsidiaries: First Bank
- Website: localfirstbank.com

First Bancorp is an American bank holding company headquartered in Southern Pines, North Carolina, that operates as First Bank in North Carolina and South Carolina.

As of 2023, First Bancorp has 118 branches and about $12 billion in assets. First Bank was the sixth largest bank in North Carolina. It had branches in North Carolina including in Asheville, Charlotte, Winston-Salem, and Wilmington and twelve branches in the South Carolina communities of Greenville, Greer, Anderson, Fountain Inn, Columbia, Orangeburg, Charleston, Cheraw, Dillon, Florence, Blacksburg and Rock Hill.

First Bancorp has two additional subsidiaries: Montgomery Data Services, Inc. and First Bank Insurance Services, Inc., which in February 2010 bought The Insurance Center, Inc.

== History ==
Bank of Montgomery began in Troy, North Carolina, in 1935 and changed its name to First Bank in February 1985.

On December 16, 1999, First Bancorp agreed to buy First Savings Bancorp Inc., parent of First Savings Bank of Moore County, with six branches and $325 million in assets, for $78.4 million in stock.

On October 23, 2000, First Bancorp announced its purchase of Century Bancorp of Thomasville and its subsidiary Home Savings, founded in 1915. At the time, First Bank had 43 branches in 15 counties. In the Thomasville area First Bank already had branches in High Point and Archdale.

On October 1, 2008, First Bancorp announced the completion of its merger with Great Pee Dee Bancorp, Inc., the holding company of Sentry Bank and Trust, headquartered in Cheraw, South Carolina, with branches in Cheraw and Florence, $221 million in assets, and $155 million in deposits.

On June 19, 2009, the Federal Deposit Insurance Corporation closed Cooperative Bank of Wilmington, chartered in 1898 and the second bank in North Carolina to fail in 2009; First Bank took over its 24 branches and $774 million in deposits as of June 22.

In 2011, First Bancorp took over five Bank of Asheville branches with $210 million in assets after state regulators closed the bank.

In 2013, First Bancorp moved its corporate headquarters from Troy, North Carolina, to Southern Pines, North Carolina.

On March 4, 2016, First Bancorp and First Community Bank announced a deal in which First Community would sell all three of its branches in Winston-Salem, North Carolina, and one each in Huntersville, North Carolina, and Mooresville, North Carolina, to First Bancorp. Deposits at these branches totalled $130 million. First Bank would sell seven Virginia branches to First Community. With deposits totalling $150 million, these were located in Abingdon, Blacksburg, Christiansburg, Fort Chiswell, Radford, Salem and Wytheville.

On March 4, 2017, First Bancorp completed a $93 million deal with Carolina Bank Holdings Inc. of Greensboro, North Carolina, which would add $706 million in assets, $601 million in deposits, eight branches and three mortgage offices.

A $175 million cash and stock deal with ASB Bancorp Inc. of Asheville, North Carolina, completed March 19, 2018, gave First Bancorp an additional $803 million in assets and 13 Asheville Savings Bank branches in Buncombe, Madison, McDowell, Henderson and Transylvania Counties in Western North Carolina.

In its first acquisition since 2017, First Bancorp announced a $314.3 million deal with Dunn, North Carolina–based Select Bancorp Inc. on June 1, 2021. First Bancorp gains $1.8 billion in assets and 22 branches, including branches in South Carolina and Virginia, for a total of $9.6 billion in assets, and reaches fifth place in deposits in North Carolina with $7.2 billion. The deal was completed October 18, 2021.

On January 3, 2023, First Bancorp announced the completion of the $181.1 million purchase of Greenville, South Carolina-based GrandSouth Bancorp. The deal gave First Bancorp $1.3 billion more in assets and eight branches including its first in Charleston, South Carolina, and Columbia, South Carolina.

On July 14, 2026, First Bancorp announced the $166 million purchase of First Carolina Bancshares Corp. of Florence, South Carolina, which had $831 million in assets.
