= Effect Radio =

Christian rock radio network in the United States

- Type: Radio network
- Country: United States

Ownership
- Owner: The River Christian Fellowship
- Sister stations: CSN International

History
- Launch date: 1996

Links
- Webcast: Listen live
- Website: www.effectradio.com

Effect Radio is a network of radio stations airing a Christian Rock format. The network is owned by The River Christian Fellowship, formerly Calvary Chapel of Twin Falls, Idaho, United States. It is a sister network to the more widely distributed CSN International.

== Stations ==
Effect Radio has about 70 stations nationwide, from Hawaii to the east coast. One thing to note: These station counts fluctuate as the movement and growth of CSN Radio and Effect Radio occurs. The satellite network's flagship station is KEFX based in Twin Falls, Idaho.

=== Full powered stations ===
Call sign	Frequency	City of license	State	Facility ID	Class	Power (W)	ERP (W)	Height (m (ft))
WYJC	90.3 FM	Greenville	Florida	122010	A	—	1,000	56 m (184 ft)
KCIF	90.3 FM	Hilo	Hawaii	81518	A	—	5,000	−40.2 m (−132 ft)
KCNU	103.9 FM	Silver City	Idaho	198794	C3	—	380	698 m (2,290 ft)
KEFX (Note: Flagship station)	88.9 FM	Twin Falls	Idaho	8432	C0	—	100,000	302 m (991 ft)
KHFG-LP	101.7 FM	Helena	Montana	131415	L1	—	100	26 m (85 ft)
KEFS	89.5 FM	North Powder	Oregon	122934	A	—	165	544.8 m (1,787 ft)
WTZE	1470 AM	Tazewell	Virginia	64664	D	5,000 (day)	—	—
KQXI	91.5 FM	Granite Falls	Washington	170239	A	—	1,600	−92 m (−302 ft)

=== Low powered translators ===
In addition to its full powered stations, Effect Radio is relayed by 56 translators.

Call sign	Frequency (MHz)	City of license	State	FCC info
K210DL	89.9	Apple Valley	California	FCC (K210DL)
K201ES	88.1	Blythe	California	FCC (K201ES)
K259CA	99.7	Caliente	California	FCC (K259CA)
K205EJ	88.9	Chester	California	FCC (K205EJ)
K204DK	88.7	Chico	California	FCC (K204DK)
K207CE	89.3	Cottonwood	California	FCC (K207CE)
K210EN	89.9	Joshua Tree	California	FCC (K210EN)
K219LN	91.7	Lake Isabella	California	FCC (K219LN)
K220IR	91.9	Lewiston	California	FCC (K220IR)
K253CC	98.5	Red Bluff	California	FCC (K253CC)
K201JE	88.1	Richvale	California	FCC (K201JE)
W215CF	90.9	Milledgeville	Georgia	FCC (W215CF)
K206EJ	89.1	Kailua-Kona	Hawaii	FCC (K206EJ)
K212FS	90.3	Kihei	Hawaii	FCC (K212FS)
K212GE	90.3	Lihue	Hawaii	FCC (K212GE)
K265EY	100.9	Cascade	Idaho	FCC (K265EY)
K206ET	89.1	Grangeville	Idaho	FCC (K206ET)
K203ER	88.5	Lewiston	Idaho	FCC (K203ER)
K260AO	99.9	McCall	Idaho	FCC (K260AO)
K272DV	102.3	Mountain Home	Idaho	FCC (K272DV)
K220JU	91.9	Nampa	Idaho	FCC (K220JU)
K206BW	89.1	Adel	Iowa	FCC (K206BW)
W214BE	90.7	Raymond	Mississippi	FCC (W214BE)
K220JX	91.9	Missoula	Montana	FCC (K220JX)
K209EV	89.7	Hadar	Nebraska	FCC (K209EV)
K208CK	89.5	Scottsbluff	Nebraska	FCC (K208CK)
K203DP	88.5	Argenta	Nevada	FCC (K203DP)
K204EU	88.7	Elko	Nevada	FCC (K204EU)
K220JW	91.9	Las Vegas	Nevada	FCC (K220JW)
K215CX	90.9	Lovelock	Nevada	FCC (K215CX)
K215FK	90.9	Sparks	Nevada	FCC (K215FK)
K211FE	90.1	Winnemucca	Nevada	FCC (K211FE)
K216EA	91.1	Alamogordo	New Mexico	FCC (K216EA)
K208DR	89.5	Roswell	New Mexico	FCC (K208DR)
W209CI	89.7	Binghamton	New York	FCC (W209CI)
K216FR	91.1	Clinton	Oklahoma	FCC (K216FR)
K208FD	89.5	Elk City	Oklahoma	FCC (K208FD)
K206CI	89.1	Mooreland	Oklahoma	FCC (K206CI)
K210DS	89.9	Brookings	Oregon	FCC (K210DS)
K210DP	89.9	Coos Bay	Oregon	FCC (K210DP)
K213DX	90.5	Hines	Oregon	FCC (K213DX)
K216FU	91.1	Island City	Oregon	FCC (K216FU)
K212DQ	90.3	Lakeview	Oregon	FCC (K212DQ)
K267BM	101.3	Langlois	Oregon	FCC (K267BM)
K220JS	91.9	Ontario	Oregon	FCC (K220JS)
W201CH	88.1	Charleston	South Carolina	FCC (W201CH)
K209FR	89.7	Aberdeen	South Dakota	FCC (K209FR)
K219LD	91.7	Rapid City	South Dakota	FCC (K219LD)
K208DH	89.5	Bushland	Texas	FCC (K208DH)
K213DT	90.5	Kerrville	Texas	FCC (K213DT)
K201FX	88.1	Reno	Texas	FCC (K201FX)
K201JD	88.1	Provo	Utah	FCC (K201JD)
W238DB	95.5	Tazewell	Virginia	FCC (W238DB)
K216GV	91.1	Bellingham	Washington	FCC (K216GV)
K203ER	88.5	Clarkston	Washington	FCC (K203ER)
K260AN	99.9	Clarkston	Washington	FCC (K260AN)
K205DF	88.9	Enumclaw	Washington	FCC (K205DF)
K201EN	88.1	Everett	Washington	FCC (K201EN)
K211FH	90.1	Shelton	Washington	FCC (K211FH)
