= Highlands Union Bank =

Former financial institution from Virginia, United States

- Company type: Bank
- Industry: Financial services
- Founded: 1985
- Founder: 600 investors
- Defunct: 2019
- Fate: Merged
- Successor: First Community Bank
- Headquarters: Abingdon, Virginia, United States
- Number of locations: 15 branches at its peak
- Area served: Tennessee, Virginia, and North Carolina
- Products: Banking services
- Website: www.hubank.com

Highlands Union Bank was an American financial institution based in Abingdon, Virginia. It was founded in 1985. In 2019 First Community Bank and Highlands Union Bank were merged. As a result all existing Highlands Union Bank locations were renamed to First Community Bank.

The first HUB office was started by 600 investors in an attempt to form a local bank for their community. Highlands Union Banks assets grew to $9.2 million in their first year in business. Immediately prior to the First Community Bank merger, the bank boasted 15 locations in the Tennessee, Virginia, and North Carolina Tri-state area.
