= WKQY =

- Tazewell, Virginia; United States
- Broadcast area: Tazewell, Virginia; Richlands, Virginia; Welch, West Virginia
- Frequency: 100.1 MHz

Programming
- Format: Contemporary Christian; Religious
- Network: CSN International

Ownership
- Owner: CSN International
- Sister stations: WTZE

History
- First air date: September 1, 1968
- Former call signs: WTZE-FM (1968–1998)

Technical information
- Licensing authority: FCC
- Facility ID: 64665
- Class: A
- ERP: 4,200 watts
- HAAT: 119 meters (390 ft)
- Transmitter coordinates: 37°8′1.0″N 81°35′42.0″W

Links
- Public license information: Public file; LMS
- Webcast: Listen live
- Website: csnradio.com

WKQY is a Contemporary Christian and Religious-formatted broadcast radio station licensed to Tazewell, Virginia, serving Tazewell and Richlands in Virginia and Welch in West Virginia. WKQY is owned and operated by CSN International.

== History ==
WKQY was purchased by Calvary Chapel of Twin Falls, Inc. in 2013 and became an affiliate of CSN International on May 1, 2013.

The station was previously owned by Triad Broadcasting Company, LLC. Prior to its current format, the station aired a Classic rock format as "Eagle 100.1 & 100.9 FM", simulcasting sister station WKOY-FM.
