= Walter McDonald Sanders House =

Historic house in Virginia, United States

- U.S. National Register of Historic Places
- Virginia Landmarks Register
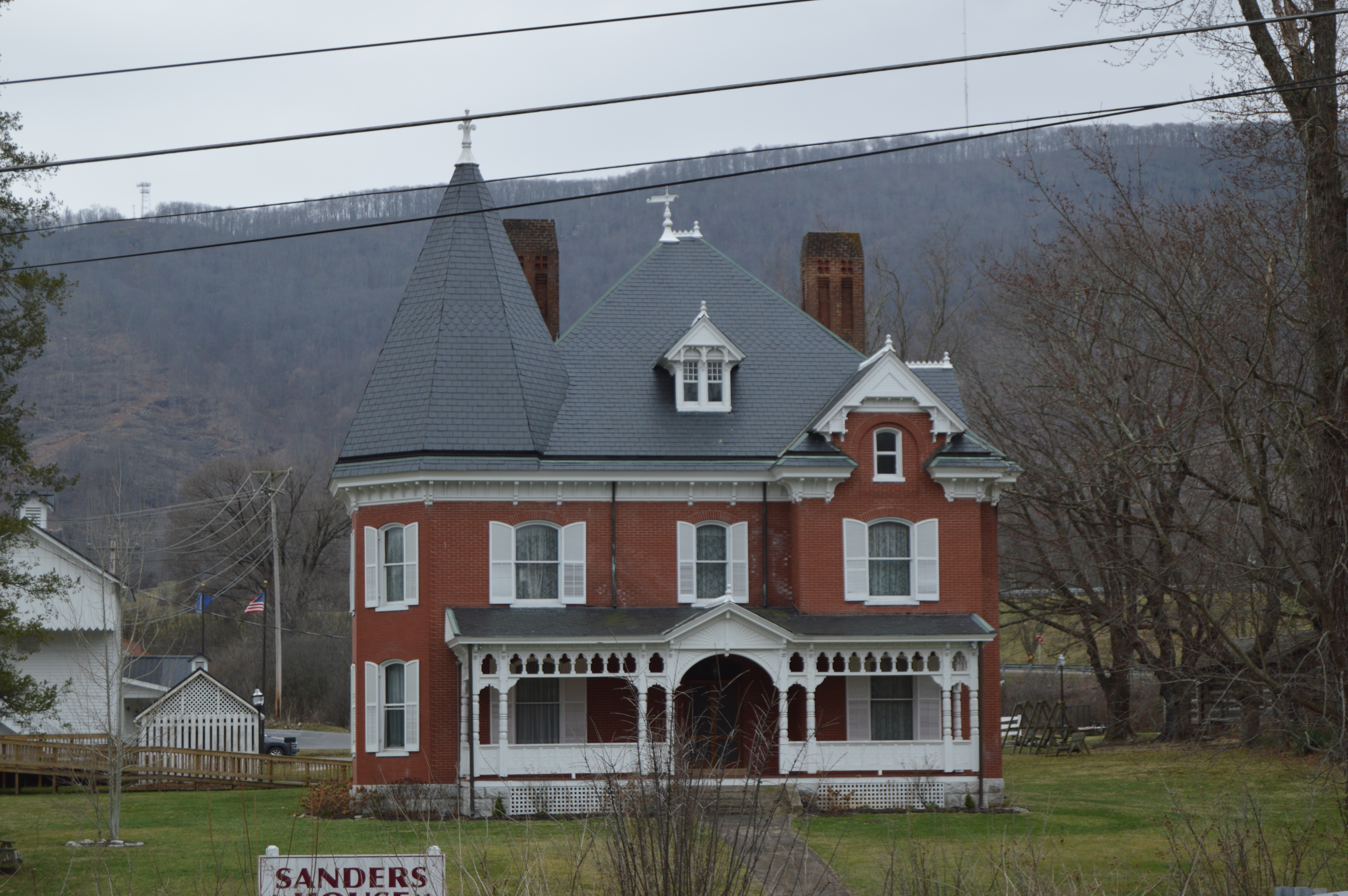
- Front of the house

- Location within Virginia Location within the United States
- Location: College Ave., Bluefield, Virginia
- Coordinates: 37°14′20″N 81°15′34.5″W
- Area: 2 acres (0.81 ha)
- Built: 1894
- Architectural style: Queen Anne
- NRHP reference No.: 02001370
- VLR No.: 143-5022

Significant dates
- Added to NRHP: November 21, 2002
- Designated VLR: September 11, 2002

The Walter McDonald Sanders House is a historic house that forms the center of the Sanders House Center complex at Bluefield in Tazewell County, Virginia, United States. It was built between 1894 and 1896, and is a large two-story, three-bay, red brick Queen Anne-style dwelling. A two-story, brick over frame addition was built in 1911. The house features a highly decorative, almost full-length, shed-roofed front porch; a pyramidal roof; and a corner turret with conical roof. Also on the property are the contributing limestone spring house, a frame smokehouse which contains a railroad museum, a frame granary, and an early-20th century small frame dwelling known as the Rosie Trigg Cottage, which houses the Tazewell County Visitor Center.

The house was listed on the National Register of Historic Places in 2002.
