= WVVA =

Television station in Bluefield, West Virginia

- Bluefield–Beckley–; Oak Hill, West Virginia; United States
- City: Bluefield, West Virginia
- Channels: Digital: 17 (UHF); Virtual: 6
- Branding: WVVA; Two Virginias' CW 6.2

Programming
- Affiliations: 6.1: NBC; 6.2: CW+; for others, see § Subchannels

Ownership
- Owner: Gray Media; (Gray Television Licensee, LLC)

History
- Founded: October 29, 1954
- First air date: July 31, 1955
- Former call signs: WHIS-TV (1955–1979)
- Former channel numbers: Analog: 6 (VHF, 1955–2009); Digital: 46 (UHF, 2001–2019)
- Call sign meaning: Postal abbreviations of West Virginia and Virginia

Technical information
- Licensing authority: FCC
- Facility ID: 74176
- ERP: 545 kW
- HAAT: 370 m (1,214 ft)
- Transmitter coordinates: 37°15′21.1″N 81°10′53.3″W

Links
- Public license information: Public file; LMS
- Website: www.wvva.com

WVVA (channel 6) is a television station licensed to Bluefield, West Virginia, United States, serving the Bluefield–Beckley–Oak Hill market as an affiliate of NBC and The CW Plus. Owned by Gray Media, the station maintains studios on U.S. Route 460 in Bluefield, West Virginia, and its transmitter is located atop East River Mountain, near the West Virginia–Virginia border.

== History ==
The station went on the air on July 31, 1955, as WHIS-TV. The station's call sign was derived from WHIS radio (1440 AM), which in turn was named in honor of longtime West Virginia politician Hugh Ike Shott, who had died two years earlier. The stations were owned by the Shott family's Daily Telegraph Publishing Company, which also owned the Bluefield Daily Telegraph. Channel 6 signed on under the special commitment of a VHF allotment to Bluefield after the release of the Federal Communications Commission (FCC)'s Sixth Report and Order in 1952. Because of its proposed antenna height and location on East River Mountain, the channel 6 allocation in Bluefield was short-spaced to WATE-TV (also on channel 6) in Knoxville, Tennessee, and side-spaced to WCYB-TV (on adjacent channel 5) in Bristol, Virginia. As a result, the proposed station on the channel 6 frequency would therefore be limited to one-half of the visual maximum effective radiated power for analog channels 2 through 6, or 50,000 watts.

Unable to obtain a network feed, the Shotts were forced to construct a privately owned microwave relay system to receive NBC programming from WSLS-TV in Roanoke, Virginia, the closest and most accessible city receiving network signals via the AT&T Long Lines system. When it was completed in September WHIS-TV began carrying NBC programs, the first being The Pinky Lee Show. The station's operations were originally housed in the Bluefield Municipal Building; on January 1, 1967, the WHIS stations moved into new facilities on Big Laurel Highway (US 19–460), known as "Broadcast Center," and channel 6 began full color operations.

For a long time, the WHIS stations were the only broadcasting outlets in Bluefield. Although the Shotts' media holdings were considered a monopoly by some (as highlighted in a July 1974 Wall Street Journal article), only the newspaper was a vehicle for their conservative political views. But in 1975, the FCC decreed that a single company could not own all of the media outlets in one area, and required several small-market broadcast-print combinations to be broken up by 1980. The Shotts opted to keep the Daily Telegraph, WHIS AM, and WHIS-FM 104.5, and sell channel 6. In 1979, after four years of appeals, the Shotts sold WHIS-TV to Quincy, Illinois–based Quincy Newspapers. After the sale was completed, the new owners changed the station's call letters to WVVA (so as to comply with an FCC rule in effect at the time that required TV and radio stations in the same market, but with different ownership to use different call letters) on May 1, 1979; the call letters refer to the states that channel 6 serves, West Virginia and Virginia.

On February 17, 2009, WVVA switched to "Digital Nightlight" service on its analog signal showing information on the transition to exclusive digital television and its nightly 6 o'clock newscast. Post-transition digital operations continued on channel 46, remapping to virtual channel 6. The station's analog service was terminated altogether in late-April 2009.

On February 1, 2021, Gray Television announced its intent to purchase Quincy Media for $925 million. The acquisition was completed on August 2, making WVVA sister to Gray stations in nearby markets, including CBS affiliates WDBJ in Roanoke and WDTV in Clarksburg, ABC affiliate WHSV-TV in Harrisonburg and fellow NBC affiliates WSAZ-TV in Huntington–Charleston, WTAP-TV in Parkersburg and WVIR-TV in Charlottesville. This leaves the Wheeling–Steubenville market and the portions of the Washington, D.C., and Pittsburgh markets that extend into West Virginia as the only parts of the state not covered by a Gray station (though Washington houses a national political bureau for Gray).

=== WVVA-DT2 ===
From 1995 until late 1998, The WB's programming was available in the Beckley–Bluefield–Oak Hill market via WGN-TV's national feed. The station launched in late-1998 as a cable-only station with the fictional call sign "WBB". It was a WB affiliate through The WB 100+ which was a similar operation to the current CW Plus service. "WBB" was identified on-air as "West Virginia's WB 18" (based on its channel location on cable). WVVA provided promotional and advertising services for this station. On January 24, 2006, it was announced that The WB and UPN would end broadcasting and merge to form a new combined service, which would be called The CW. The letters would represent the first initial of corporate parents CBS (the parent company of UPN) and the Warner Bros. unit of Time Warner.

When The CW launched on September 18, "WBB" was added to a new second digital subchannel of WVVA to offer non-cable subscribers access to the network. At this point, it began using the WVVA-DT2 calls in an official manner. For a few weeks during the summer of 2007, WVVA produced a weeknight prime time newscast at 10 on WVVA-DT2. Airing for thirty minutes, the show featured news anchor Erica Greenway (no longer with station), chief meteorologist Corey Henderson, and sports director P. J. Ziegler (now with WJW in Cleveland). It is unknown why the program was dropped after such a short run.

== Newscasts ==
WVVA remains one of the strongest NBC affiliates in the country and continually averages high Nielsen rating shares in the mountainous nine county market. WVVA began broadcasting local newscasts in high definition from a totally renovated studio with new sets as well as a new control room in June 2012. In addition to its main studios, WVVA operates a Beckley Bureau (on Main Street along North Kanawha Street/WV 210) and a "virtual" Greenbrier Valley Bureau (covering Summers, Monroe, and Greenbrier counties in West Virginia as well as Giles County, Virginia).

== Subchannels ==
The station's signal is multiplexed:

Subchannels of WVVA
Channel	Res.	Short name	Programming
6.1	1080i	WVVANBC	NBC
6.2	720p	WVVACW	The CW Plus
6.3	480i	WWVAME	MeTV
6.4	480i	CourtTV	Court TV
6.5	480i	START	Start TV
6.6	480i	WVVA365	365BLK

WVVA has a construction permit for a digital fill-in translator on channel 43 from a transmitter near Layland. This will have the same call sign as the main signal and primarily serve the northern portion of the market.

== See also ==
- Channel 6 virtual TV stations in the United States
- Channel 17 digital TV stations in the United States
