= Bluefield Daily Telegraph =

Newspaper in Bluefield, West Virginia

- Type: Daily newspaper
- Format: Broadsheet
- Owner: Community Newspaper Holdings Inc.
- Editor: Samantha Perry
- Founded: 1896
- Headquarters: 928 Bluefield Avenue, Bluefield, West Virginia 24701 United States
- Circulation: 14,622 (as of 2016)
- Website: bdtonline.com

The Bluefield Daily Telegraph is a newspaper based in Bluefield, West Virginia, and also covering surrounding communities in McDowell, Mercer and Monroe counties, West Virginia; and Bland, Buchanan, Giles and Tazewell counties, Virginia (including the town of Bluefield, Virginia). It publishes online Monday through Saturday. A print edition is distributed Tuesday through Saturday.

The Bluefield Daily Telegraph was launched on January 16, 1896, by long-time editor Hugh Ike Shott, who at one point controlled Bluefield's newspaper, both leading radio stations, and only television station. Nobel Prize winner John Forbes Nash Jr., a Bluefield native, worked for a time as an inserter, hand inserting sales pieces into the Bluefield Daily Telegraph before going on to a distinguished career in mathematics.

The weekly Princeton Times, covering Princeton, West Virginia, is also published at the Bluefield Daily Telegraph office. Both newspapers are owned by Community Newspaper Holdings Inc, who acquired them from The Thomson Corporation in 2000.
