= WMJC =

- Richland, Michigan; United States
- Broadcast area: Kalamazoo–Battle Creek, Michigan
- Frequency: 91.9 MHz
- Branding: Strong Tower Radio

Programming
- Format: Christian radio
- Affiliations: Strong Tower Radio

Ownership
- Owner: Strong Tower Radio; (West Central Michigan Media Ministries)
- Sister stations: KTGG, WNHG

History
- First air date: 2008; 18 years ago
- Former call signs: WTNP (2008–2011)

Technical information
- Licensing authority: FCC
- Facility ID: 121857
- Class: A
- ERP: 6,000 watts
- HAAT: 67.4 meters (221 ft)
- Transmitter coordinates: 40°11′53″N 86°07′44″W
- Translator: (97.3 MHz) W247AM (Kalamazoo)

Links
- Public license information: Public file; LMS
- Webcast: Listen Live
- Website: Official Website

WMJC (91.9 FM) is a radio station broadcasting a Christian format as an affiliate of the Strong Tower Radio. WMJC is licensed to Richland, Michigan, United States. WMJC is simulcast on a translator in Kalamazoo, 97.3 W247AM.

== History ==
The station began broadcasting in 2008, holding the call sign WTNP, and was owned by Horizon Broadcasting Network. The station's call sign was changed to WMJC on May 1, 2011. Soon thereafter, the station was sold to Calvary Radio Network, Inc. for $75,000. Effective July 19, 2021, the station was sold to West Central Michigan Media Ministries, along with its translator 97.3 W247AM, for $150,000, and it became an affiliate of Strong Tower Radio.
