= WHKX =

- Bluefield, Virginia; United States
- Broadcast area: Bluefield, Virginia; Tazewell, Virginia; Bland, Virginia; Bluefield, West Virginia; Princeton, West Virginia
- Frequency: 106.3 MHz
- Branding: Kicks Country

Programming
- Format: Country
- Affiliations: Premiere Networks; Westwood One

Ownership
- Owner: Charles Spencer and Rick Lambert; (First Media Services, LLC)
- Sister stations: WHAJ, WHIS, WHQX, WKEZ, WKOY-FM, WKQB, WKQR, WAMN, WELC

History
- First air date: December 1966
- Former call signs: WOVE-FM (1966–1969); WKJC (1969–1974); WBDY (1974–1980); WBDY-FM (1980–1997); WHKX (1997–present)
- Call sign meaning: WH KiX (kicks)

Technical information
- Licensing authority: FCC
- Facility ID: 6004
- Class: A
- Power: 330 watts
- HAAT: 420 meters (1,380 ft)
- Transmitter coordinates: 37°15′5.0″N 81°11′20.0″W
- Repeater: 107.7 WHQX (Gary, West Virginia)

Links
- Public license information: Public file; LMS
- Webcast: Listen live
- Website: www.kickscountry.com

WHKX (106.3 FM) is an American country-formatted broadcast radio station licensed to Bluefield, Virginia, serving Bluefield, Tazewell, and Bland in Virginia and Bluefield and Princeton in West Virginia. WHKX is owned and operated by Charles Spencer and Rick Lambert, through licensee First Media Services, LLC.

== History ==
106.3 FM in this region launched as WOVE-FM, the FM counterpart of WOVE (1340 AM), in 1966. In 1969, Kenneth J. Crosthwaite, who had owned WOVE, acquired the station, changed the call letters to WKJC and was approved to change its city of license from Welch, West Virginia, to Bluefield.
