= WKOY-FM =

- Princeton, West Virginia; United States
- Broadcast area: Princeton, West Virginia; Bluefield, Virginia; Bluefield, West Virginia
- Frequency: 100.9 MHz
- Branding: The Eagle 100.9

Programming
- Format: Classic rock
- Affiliations: John Boy and Billy

Ownership
- Owner: Charles Spencer and Rick Lambert; (First Media Services, LLC)
- Sister stations: WHAJ, WHIS, WHKX, WHQX, WKEZ, WKQR, WKQB, WAMN, WELC

History
- First air date: 1983
- Former call signs: WKMY (1983–1997)

Technical information
- Licensing authority: FCC
- Facility ID: 44002
- Class: A
- ERP: 340 watts
- HAAT: 409 meters (1,342 ft)
- Transmitter coordinates: 37°15′5.0″N 81°11′20.0″W

Links
- Public license information: Public file; LMS
- Webcast: Listen Live
- Website: TheEagle100.9.com

WKOY-FM (100.9 MHz) is an American classic rock-formatted broadcast radio station licensed to Princeton, West Virginia, serving Princeton, West Virginia, Bluefield, Virginia and Bluefield, West Virginia. WKOY-FM is owned and operated by Charles Spencer and Rick Lambert, through licensee First Media Services, LLC.
