= WELC =

Simulcasting WKEZ Bluefield
- Welch, West Virginia; United States
- Broadcast area: Welch, West Virginia; McDowell County, West Virginia
- Frequency: 1150 kHz
- Branding: 98.7 EZ-FM

Programming
- Format: Soft adult contemporary
- Affiliations: West Virginia MetroNews

Ownership
- Owner: First Media Services
- Sister stations: WAMN, WKQB, WKQR, WHAJ, WHKX, WHQX, WKOY-FM, WKEZ

History
- First air date: 1950
- Call sign meaning: WELCh

Technical information
- Licensing authority: FCC
- Facility ID: 52865
- Class: D
- Power: 5,000 watts daytime only
- Transmitter coordinates: 37°25′1.0″N 81°36′58.0″W
- Translator: 93.3 W227DU (Welch)

Links
- Public license information: Public file; LMS
- Webcast: Listen Live
- Website: myezradio.com

WELC (1150 kHz, "98.7 EZ-FM") is a soft adult contemporary formatted broadcast radio station licensed to Welch, West Virginia serving Welch and McDowell County, West Virginia. WELC is owned by First Media Services, LLC.

At midnight on January 1, 2020, the station flipped to soft adult contemporary as "98.7 EZ-FM", in simulcast with WKEZ 1240 AM Bluefield.
