= Triad Broadcasting =

Triad Broadcasting Company, LLC
- Company type: Private
- Industry: Entertainment
- Founded: July 1999
- Headquarters: Monterey, California
- Key people: David Benjamin (CEO & President)
- Services: Broadcast radio

Triad Broadcasting Company, LLC was an owner of radio stations in small and medium markets in the United States. It is based in Monterey, California.

At the end of November 2012, Triad announced the sale of its 32 radio stations in 5 markets to L&L Broadcasting, LLC. In January 2013, Triad filed to transfer 30 of the stations to L&L Broadcasting, and leave the other two — 100.1 WKQY and 1470 WTZE at Tazewell, Virginia — to be shut down or sold to someone else at the request of L&L. The two Virginia stations were sold to Calvary Chapel of Twin Falls, Inc. in May 2013.
