= WHAJ =

- Bluefield, West Virginia; United States
- Broadcast area: Southern West Virginia; Southwestern Virginia
- Frequency: 104.5 MHz
- Branding: J104

Programming
- Format: Contemporary hit radio
- Affiliations: Premiere Networks; Westwood One; Mountaineer Sports Network; Washington Capitals; West Virginia MetroNews

Ownership
- Owner: Charles Spencer and Rick Lambert; (First Media Services, LLC)
- Sister stations: WHIS; WHKX; WHQX; WKEZ; WKOY-FM; WKQR; WKQB; WAMN; WELC

History
- First air date: 1963
- Former call signs: WHIS-FM (1963–1976)

Technical information
- Licensing authority: FCC
- Facility ID: 504
- Class: C
- ERP: 100,000 watts (horizontal); 80,000 watts (vertical)
- HAAT: 472.2 meters (1,549 ft)
- Transmitter coordinates: 37°15′5″N 81°11′20″W

Links
- Public license information: Public file; LMS
- Webcast: Listen live
- Website: www.j104radio.com

WHAJ (104.5 FM, "J104") is a contemporary hit radio formatted broadcast radio station licensed to Bluefield, West Virginia, United States, serving Southern West Virginia and Southwestern Virginia. WHAJ is owned and operated by Charles Spencer and Rick Lambert, through licensee First Media Services, LLC.

== History ==
The first station to use 104.5 MHz in Bluefield, West Virginia, WHIS-FM, went on the air in 1948 as the strongest FM station in the world at the time, with an effective radiated power of 186,000 watts. It was the sister station of WHIS. WHIS-FM was not successful, and broadcasting had permanently ceased by 1950. The management of WHIS decided to relaunch an FM station in 1963, this time with an effective radiated power of 5.8 kW. In 1977, power was increased to 100 kW and the call sign was changed from WHIS-FM to WHAJ to emphasize separate programming from WHIS.

When the radio station was relaunched in 1963, the studios were co-located with WHIS and WHIS-TV in what was then the Bluefield City Hall. In December 1967, the three stations moved to a new, state-of-the-art facility on East Cumberland Road. The facility was known as Broadcast Center. WHIS-TV was sold to Quincy Newspapers in 1980; the renamed WVVA remained in Broadcast Center. WHIS and WHAJ moved to 900 Bluefield Avenue.

== Technical ==
=== Automation ===
From the 1970s until 1987, WHAJ used a Shaffer 903 automation system. From 1987 to 1990, WHAJ did not employ radio automation. On March 6, 1990, WHAJ became the world's first radio station to use Computer Concepts' Digital Commercial System (DCS) automation, considered the first commercially successful digital radio automation systems. In 1996, the DCS system was replaced by a first-generation system from Scott Studios. The older Scott Studios system was upgraded to Scott Studios SS32 in 2003.

=== Transmitter sites ===
WHAJ's transmitter is located on East River Mountain, overlooking the city of Bluefield. When the station returned to the air in 1963, the transmitter was co-located with WHIS-TV. The antenna was side-mounted on the TV tower. The transmitter was an RCA BTF-5D.

WVVA's transmitter site is unique because the TV transmitter building is in the state of Virginia, but the TV tower and antenna are in West Virginia. This was a problem in 1977, when the management of the station wished to begin operations at 100 kW. In accordance with FCC rules FM radio stations in West Virginia may not have an effective radiated power greater than 50 kW. This problem was solved by constructing a new tower 80 feet (24 m) to the east-southeast of the TV tower. This tower was in Virginia, enabling 100 kW operation. A Harris FM-20K transmitter and ERI 12 Bay antenna was installed and 100 kW operation began in 1977.

In the late 1990s, it became desirable to relocate the station's transmitter to a new location for two reasons. WHAJ and WVVA were no longer commonly owned, and the FM station was paying rent to the TV station for use of the transmitter site. Secondly, the site was undesirable from a technical perspective. The 1977 tower was too short and the rocky terrain would make a new, tall tower impractical. A new tower was therefore constructed approximately 1 mile to the west-southwest of the TV tower. WHAJ moved to this site in 2000, using a Broadcast Electronics 25K transmitter. Co-owned WKOY and WHKX also moved to this site. The old WHAJ tower at the WVVA site was repurposed for WVVA-DT.

== Programming ==
In the 1960s and 1970s, WHAJ had a beautiful music format and the station's on-air moniker was "Stereo 104". In August 1981, WHIS's contemporary hit radio format was moved to WHAJ, and J104 was born. J104 was an instant success both in terms of ratings and advertiser acceptance. For most of the 1980s, J104 was the most listened-to radio station in West Virginia. Today, J104 continues to be one of West Virginia's most successful radio stations, winning the West Virginia Broadcasters Association "Station of the Year" Award in 2004, 2005, 2006, 2007, 2010, 2011, 2012, 2013, 2014, 2015, 2017, 2018, 2020, 2021 and 2022. WHAJ was also named "Legendary Station of the Year" by the WVBA in 2010.

== See also ==
- More history on WHAJ / WHIS
- Tophour.com station id clip
