= Bluefield, Virginia =

- Town
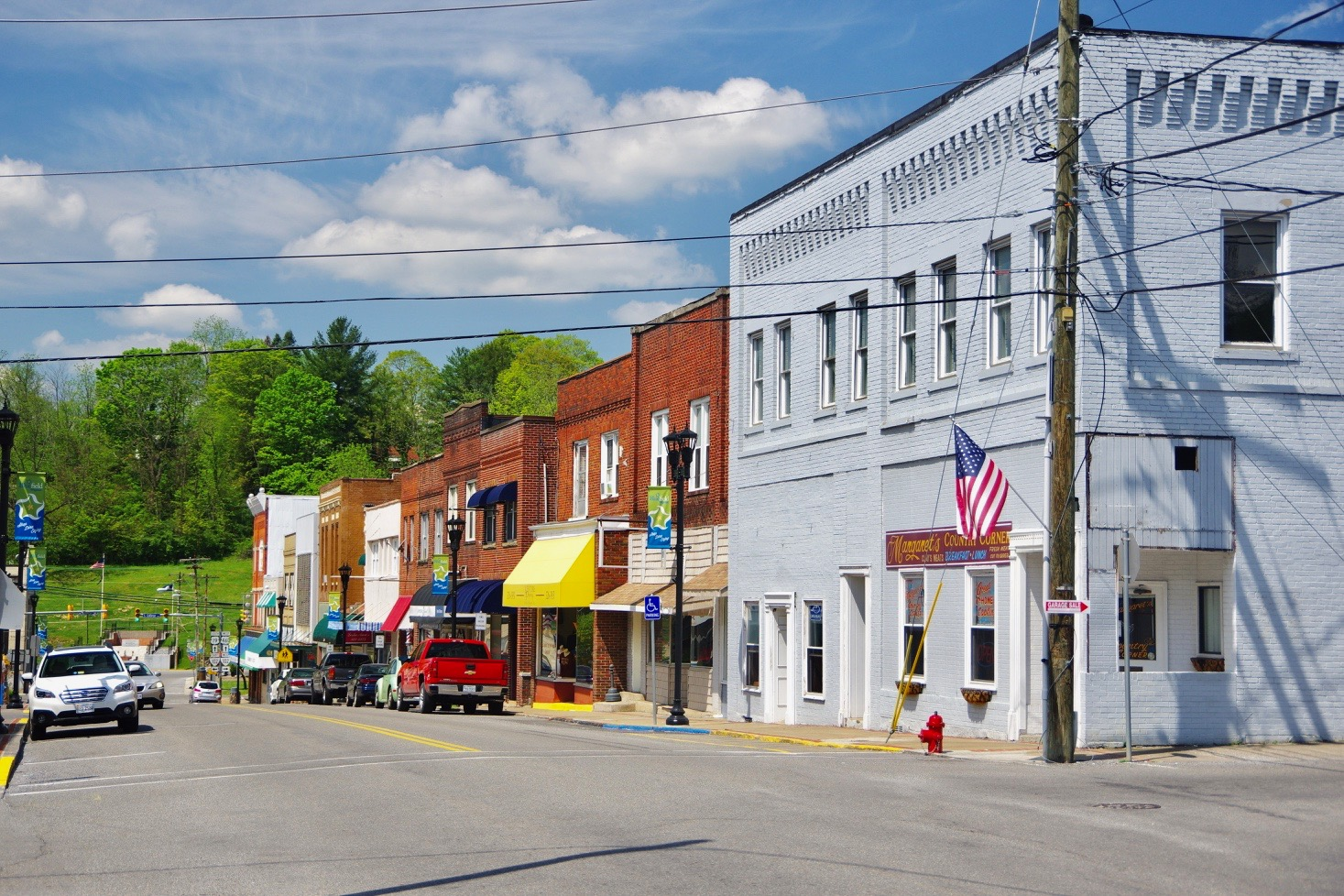
- Virginia Avenue (US 19)

- Seal
- Nickname: Virginia's Tallest Town
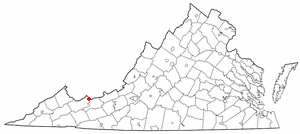
- Location in the Commonwealth of Virginia
- Coordinates: 37°14′39″N 81°16′30″W
- Country: United States
- State: Virginia
- County: Tazewell
- Founded: 1860s
- Incorporated: 1883

Government
  - Mayor: Donnie Linkous

Area
  - Town: 9.50 sq mi (24.60 km^{2})
  - Land: 9.49 sq mi (24.59 km^{2})
  - Water: 0.0039 sq mi (0.01 km^{2})
- Elevation: 2,369 ft (722 m)

Population (2020)
  - Town: 5,096
  - Density: 537/sq mi (207.2/km^{2})
  - Metro: 106,363 (Bluefield Micropolitan Area)
- Time zone: UTC−5 (EST)
  - Summer (DST): UTC−4 (EDT)
- ZIP code: 24605
- Area code: 276
- FIPS code: 51-08152
- GNIS feature ID: 1481874
- Website: www.bluefieldva.org

Bluefield is a town in Tazewell County, Virginia, United States, located along the Bluestone River. The population was 5,096 at the 2020 census. It is part of the Bluefield WV-VA micropolitan area which has a population of 106,363 in 2020.

== History ==
Bluefield has not always borne the name Bluefield. The town developed around a small post office named "Pin Hook" in the 1860s, named for a small creek that ran through the community. For a brief time it was known as the community of Harman, named after a Civil War hero from the area who had been shot during the Battle of Cloyd's Mountain in Pulaski County, Virginia.

Later, after coal was discovered and a company was formed to build a railroad to the Pocahontas Coalfields, the community's name was changed again to "Graham" to honor Col. Thomas Graham, a Philadelphia capitalist. The town was first chartered by the Commonwealth of Virginia as the town of Graham in 1884. The Norfolk and Western railroad chose Bluefield, West Virginia over Graham as the place to build its regional headquarters and main docking yards for the Pocahontas region. As a result, Bluefield, West Virginia grew at a much faster rate than did Graham.

Graham, Virginia operated under that name until a referendum on June 10, 1924. By a margin of 287 to 223, voters in Graham approved changing the name of the 5,000 member town to Bluefield, Virginia to match the larger (22,000) West Virginia city. The name change was celebrated in a mock marriage ceremony held in the city park between officials of Bluefield, Virginia, and Bluefield, West Virginia, to celebrate the renaming of Graham. Its community had borders then that are roughly the same as the downtown area alongside the railroad of today's Bluefield, Virginia.

Graham continued to hope for development as a major city in the region; it tried to attract a steel refining industry alongside the railyards. The Great Depression of the 1930s caused development in the region to come to a halt. The current Bluefield did not start to expand beyond the downtown area until the 1950s, when it annexed the small town of West Graham, Virginia to the west. It also began to develop land in the more open rural foothills to the south of the city.

As the largest town in Tazewell County, Virginia, Bluefield has expanded since the 1990s and the first decade of the new millennium. After a series of devastating floods in the early 21st century, the town has relocated its town council chambers and police department from the flood-prone historic downtown area to the southernmost point in the city at the foot of East River Mountain. The area has been developed with a Wal-Mart, the headquarters of First Community Bank, strip malls, and a medical center operating along U.S. Route 460.

Bluefield's most prominent residents are Bill Dudley, an NFL Hall of Famer; New York Giants RB and two-time Super Bowl champion Ahmad Bradshaw; and the widow of actor Lorne Greene, who previously lived in a mansion atop a hill overlooking the Sanders house. This is considered one of the most significant historic homes in the city.

The Walter McDonald Sanders House and Alexander St. Clair House are listed on the National Register of Historic Places.

== Geography ==
According to the United States Census Bureau, the town has a total area of 9.32 square miles (14.9991 km2), all land.

== Demographics ==
Historical population
Census	Pop.	Note	%±
1890	1,021		—
1900	1,554		52.2%
1910	1,917		23.4%
1920	2,752		43.6%
1930	3,906		41.9%
1940	3,921		0.4%
1950	4,212		7.4%
1960	4,235		0.5%
1970	5,286		24.8%
1980	5,946		12.5%
1990	5,363		−9.8%
2000	5,078		−5.3%
2010	5,444		7.2%
2020	5,096		−6.4%
U.S. Decennial Census

As of the census of 2000, there were 5,078 people, 2,134 households, and 1,423 families residing in the town. The population density was 669.9 people per square mile (258.7/km^{2}). There were 2,349 housing units at an average density of 309.9 per square mile (119.7/km^{2}). The racial makeup of the town was 92.30% White, 4.86% African American, 0.32% Native American, 1.42% Asian, 0.12% from other races, and 0.98% from two or more races. Hispanic or Latino of any race were 0.41% of the population.

There were 2,134 households, out of which 21.8% had children under the age of 18 living with them, 56.3% were married couples living together, 8.4% had a female householder with no husband present, and 33.3% were non-families. 30.3% of all households were made up of individuals, and 16.5% had someone living alone who was 65 years of age or older. The average household size was 2.23 and the average family size was 2.77.

In the town, the population was spread out, with 18.0% under the age of 18, 10.2% from 18 to 24, 22.2% from 25 to 44, 27.3% from 45 to 64, and 22.3% who were 65 years of age or older. The median age was 45 years. For every 100 females, there were 86.1 males. For every 100 females age 18 and over, there were 81.5 males.

The median income for a household in the town was $32,157, and the median income for a family was $44,000. Males had a median income of $34,167 versus $18,875 for females. The per capita income for the town was $21,755. About 3.9% of families and 7.6% of the population were below the poverty line, including 9.6% of those under age 18 and 8.8% of those age 65 or over.

== Sports ==
The Bluefield Blue Jays, a Minor League Baseball team, played their home games at Bowen Field, a stadium in the city park that serves both Bluefield and its neighbor of the same name in West Virginia. Although the park is operated by the West Virginia city, the stadium lies entirely within Virginia. In conjunction with a contraction of Minor League Baseball beginning with the 2021 season, the Appalachian League was reorganized as a collegiate summer baseball league, and the Blue Jays were replaced by a new franchise in the revamped league designed for rising college freshman and sophomores.

Bluefield University hosts many sports programs, including basketball, soccer, baseball, and now football. Their baseball team won the NCCAA (National Christian College Athletic Association) Division I Baseball World Series title in 2009 under coach Mike White.

Graham High School's football team won the Virginia High School League's Class 2 State Football Championship in 2024. The G-Men defeated Strasburg High School 31-8 on December 14, 2024 at Salem City Stadium for the state crown. Previous state football titles were won in 1962, 1989, 1995, 2018, and 2022.

== Government ==
The mayor is Donnie Linkous.

== Education ==
Educational institutions include Graham High School, Bluefield University and Southwest Virginia Community College.

== Notable people ==
- Ahmad Bradshaw, NFL Player
- Bill Dudley, NFL Player, Pro-Football Hall of Fame inductee
- Marl Young, Music Director for Here's Lucy
- Argyle Goolsby, From home town hero's Blitzkid

== Representation in other media ==
- The town was chosen by Hollywood film producers as the site for the 1994 remake of the classic movie, Lassie.
- It has been mentioned by musicians in numerous songs, including Blessid Union of Souls' "Oh Virginia".
