= CSN International =

Christian radio station and network based in Twin Falls, Idaho

CSN Radio
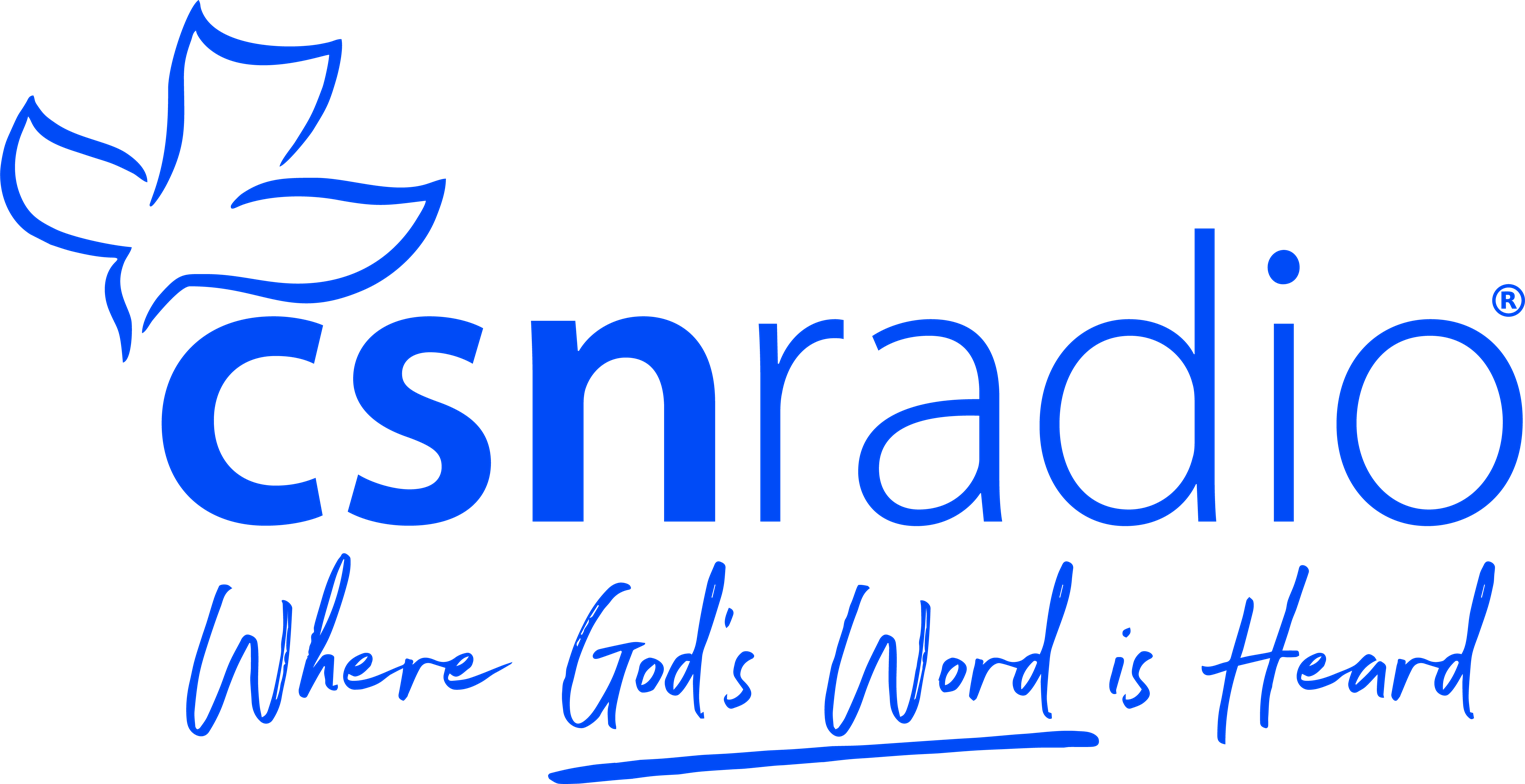
- Type: Radio network
- Country: United States
- Headquarters: Twin Falls, Idaho
- Branding: CSN Radio

Programming
- Format: Christian talk and teaching

Ownership
- Owner: CSN International, Inc.
- Sister stations: Effect Radio
- Key people: Dustin Pamplona, GM/Director of Engineering; Mike Stevens, Program Director

History
- Launch date: April 26, 1995; 31 years ago

Coverage
- Availability: Worldwide

Links
- Webcast: csnradio.com/programs/live
- Website: csnradio.com

CSN Radio is a Christian radio network based at flagship station 89.9 KAWZ in Twin Falls, Idaho. The network feeds over 350 FM translators and 59 full-power radio stations. CSN can be heard across the United States, including Alaska and the Hawaiian Islands. It uses the slogan "Where God's Word is Heard."

CSN Radio airs a variety of Christian talk and teaching programs with some Christian contemporary music. CSN is a non-profit organization. Its stations are non-commercial and depend on listener donations for support.

== History ==
KAWZ began broadcasting on April 3, 1988 (Easter Sunday), with Pastor Mike Kestler as its founder. The network was launched on April 26, 1995, broadcasting Christian radio over satellite from KAWZ in Twin Falls. The first satellite-fed translator to begin receiving the network from KAWZ was in Yucca Valley, California, and within six months the network had dozens of translators. It was originally known as the Calvary Satellite Network.

By 1999, the network had grown to include 153 stations and translators, and by 2004, it had grown to approximately 400 stations and translators across the United States.

In 2007, an agreement was reached between the Twin Falls, Idaho, based network and parties associated with Calvary Chapel Costa Mesa where the Twin Falls, Idaho, based network kept 424 of the network's 457 stations and translators, but could no longer use Calvary Chapel branding. Most of the stations received by the parties associated with Calvary Chapel Costa Mesa were sold to the Calvary Radio Network the following year.

== Programming ==
National religious programs heard on CSN include: A New Beginning with Greg Laurie, Jay Sekulow Live, Family Talk with James Dobson, Love Worth Finding with Adrian Rogers, Thru the Bible with Dr. J. Vernon McGee, The Urban Alternative with Tony Evans, Truth For Life with Alistair Begg, Washington Watch with Tony Perkins and Turning Point with David Jeremiah.

== Board members ==
Board members of the CSN International, Inc. (CSN Radio), are Pastor Mike Kestler and Ariel Kestler. Mike Kestler is pastor of The River Christian Fellowship, a nondenominational church in Twin Falls.

== Stations ==
CSN Radio is heard on over 400 radio stations in the United States.

Call sign	Frequency	City of license	State	Facility ID	Class	Power (W)	ERP (W)	Height (m (ft))
KNGW	88.9 FM	Juneau	Alaska	176566	A	—	125	−128 m (−420 ft)
KOGJ	88.1 FM	Kenai	Alaska	174802	A	—	1,100	104 m (341 ft)
KVIR	91.9 FM	Dolan Springs	Arizona	90917	C0	—	25,000	711 m (2,333 ft)
KVJC	91.9 FM	Globe	Arizona	91804	C2	—	660	1,035 m (3,396 ft)
KBMH	90.3 FM	Holbrook	Arizona	90452	A	—	250	43 metres (141 ft)
KGSF	88.7 FM	Huntsville	Arkansas	92987	C3	—	5,000	181.5 m (595 ft)
KJCU	89.9 FM	Fort Bragg	California	87930	A	—	130	106 m (348 ft)
KXAO	88.7 FM	Joshua Tree	California	768181	A	—	1,350	111 m (364 ft)
KYML	88.1 FM	San Diego Country Estates	California	767224	A	—	60	705 m (2,313 ft)
KFRS	89.9 FM	Soledad	California	86669	A	—	250	93 m (305 ft)
KSOA	90.5 FM	South Dos Palos	California	767193	A	—	265	323 m (1,060 ft)
WUJC	91.1 FM	St. Marks	Florida	122209	C1	—	74,000	138.7 m (455 ft)
KIPA	1060 AM	Hilo	Hawaii	33324	D	1,000 (daytime only)	—	—
KLNY	88.9 FM	Lanai City	Hawaii	766309	C2	—	1,800	456 m (1,496 ft)
KHJC	88.9 FM	Lihue	Hawaii	81138	A	—	2,000	109.9 m (361 ft)
KAWS	89.1 FM	Marsing	Idaho	8417	C1	—	8,750	668 m (2,192 ft)
KMHI	1240 AM	Mountain Home	Idaho	72657	C	1,000	—	—
KAWZ (Note: Flagship station)	89.9 FM	Twin Falls	Idaho	8414	C0	—	100,000	302 m (991 ft)
WXPD	91.7 FM	Wheatfield	Indiana	766380	A	—	1,700	103 metres (338 ft)
KSNB	91.5 FM	Norton	Kansas	122373	A	—	250	52 metres (171 ft)
KOKN	88.7 FM	Oketo	Kansas	177208	A	—	300	74 m (243 ft)
KIMW	105.5 FM	Heflin	Louisiana	191575	A	—	6,000	83.3 m (273 ft)
WGWS	88.1 FM	St. Mary's City	Maryland	172973	A	—	1,100	53 m (174 ft)
WSMA	90.5 FM	Scituate	Massachusetts	122202	B1	—	7,700	150 m (490 ft)
WDAA	101.5 FM	Bruce	Mississippi	762447	A	—	250	29 m (95 ft)
WWUN-FM	101.5 FM	Friars Point	Mississippi	16523	C3	—	14,000	120.4 m (395 ft)
KLWL	88.1 FM	Chillicothe	Missouri	176981	A	—	800	103 m (338 ft)
KTBJ	89.3 FM	Festus	Missouri	76989	B	—	25,000	113 m (371 ft)
KJFT	90.3 FM	Arlee	Montana	93587	C3	—	400	581 m (1,906 ft)
KGFJ	88.1 FM	Belt	Montana	172645	C2	—	730	597.3 m (1,960 ft)
KJCB	88.9 FM	Lockwood	Montana	93512	A	—	1,900	137.7 m (452 ft)
KNEF	90.1 FM	Franklin	Nebraska	177070	A	—	100	−18 m (−59 ft)
KNMA	88.1 FM	Tularosa	New Mexico	122932	C2	—	3,340	487.2 m (1,598 ft)
WLGU	90.7 FM	Lancaster	New York	83428	A	—	1,000	56 m (184 ft)
WSFW	1110 AM	Seneca Falls	New York	5391	D	1,000 day only	—	—
WIFF	90.1 FM	Windsor	New York	2868	A	—	100	209 m (686 ft)
WWYC	1560 AM	Toledo	Ohio	22672	D	1,000 day 920 critical hours 3 night	—	—
KJCC	89.5 FM	Carnegie	Oklahoma	122517	C2	—	23,500	118.8 m (390 ft)
KDJC	88.1 FM	Baker	Oregon	121839	C2	—	775	551.8 m (1,810 ft)
KJCH	90.9 FM	Coos Bay	Oregon	90263	C2	—	3,500	445.8 m (1,463 ft)
KQDL	89.1 FM	Hines	Oregon	174458	A	—	300	266.6 m (875 ft)
KGNR	91.9 FM	John Day	Oregon	37433	A	—	1,500	−33 m (−108 ft)
KPIJ	88.5 FM	Junction City	Oregon	92491	C2	—	650	711 m (2,333 ft)
KKJA	89.9 FM	Redmond	Oregon	92285	C2	—	1,500	672.9 m (2,208 ft)
KWRC	90.9 FM	Hermosa	South Dakota	90500	C3	—	400	386.8 m (1,269 ft)
WAUO	90.7 FM	Hohenwald	Tennessee	82543	A	—	500	71 metres (233 ft)
KCKT	88.5 FM	Crockett	Texas	93122	A	—	250	49 metres (161 ft)
KGDL	92.1 FM	Trent	Texas	171016	C3	—	19,000	114 m (374 ft)
KLFK	98.7 FM	Wells	Texas	762285	A	—	2,800	113 m (371 ft)
KBJF	90.5 FM	Nephi	Utah	174640	C	—	75,000	657.4 m (2,157 ft)
WCBX	900 AM	Bassett	Virginia	18887	D	1,000 day 180 night	—	—
WKQY	100.1 FM	Tazewell	Virginia	64665	A	—	4,200	119 m (390 ft)
KJCF	89.3 FM	Asotin	Washington	106475	A	—	175	−100 m (−330 ft)
KHOD	90.1 FM	Hoodsport	Washington	767430	A	—	100	−43 m (−141 ft)
KTJC	91.1 FM	Kelso	Washington	92487	C2	—	8,000	189 m (620 ft)
KXML	90.3 FM	Moses Lake	Washington	767423	A	—	3,500	38 m (125 ft)
KWYC	90.3 FM	Cheyenne	Wyoming	87267	C2	—	20,500	129.7 m (426 ft)
KLWD	91.9 FM	Gillette	Wyoming	84184	A	—	1,000	97 m (318 ft)
KWCF	89.3 FM	Sheridan	Wyoming	90842	C3	—	850	292.2 m (959 ft)

=== Translators ===
CSN International is relayed by many additional translators nationwide.
