= List of radio stations in Colorado =

Coordinates: 38.9972°N 105.5478°W

The following is a list of FCC-licensed radio stations in the U.S. State of Colorado, which can be sorted by their call signs, frequencies, cities of license, licensees, and programming formats.

== List of radio stations ==
Call sign	Frequency	City of license	Licensee	Format
KAAI	98.5 FM	Palisade	Educational Media Foundation	Worship music (Air1)
KAFM	88.1 FM	Grand Junction	Grand Valley Public Radio Co, Inc	Variety
KAJX	91.5 FM	Aspen	Roaring Fork Public Radio	Variety
KAKR	103.7 FM	Akron	Northeast Colorado Broadcasting LLC	
KALC	105.9 FM	Denver	Audacy License, LLC	Top 40 (CHR)
KALQ-FM	93.5 FM	Alamosa	Wolf Creek Broadcasting, LLC	Country
KAMP	1430 AM	Aurora	Audacy License, LLC	Sports gambling
KASF	90.9 FM	Alamosa	Adams State College	Educational
KASP-LP	107.9 FM	Aspen	Colorado, State Of, Telecom Servs	Weather
KATC-FM	95.1 FM	Colorado Springs	Radio License Holding CBC, LLC	Country
KATR-FM	98.3 FM	Otis	Media Logic, LLC	Country
KAVI-LP	106.5 FM	La Junta	Koshare Indian Museum Incorporated	Variety
KAVP	1450 AM	Colona	WS Communications, LLC	Sports (ESPN)
KAYV	97.1 FM	Crested Butte	Arkansas Valley Broadcasting, Inc.	Classic rock
KAYW	98.1 FM	Meeker	Western Slope Communications, L.L.C.	Classic rock
KBCO	97.3 FM	Boulder	iHM Licenses, LLC	Adult album alternative
KBCR-FM	96.9 FM	Steamboat Springs	Blizzard Broadcasting LLC	Country
KBDL-LP	107.9 FM	Carbondale	Colorado, State Of, Telecom Servs	Emergency Info
KBEI	90.5 FM	Brush	Educational Communications of Colorado Springs, Inc.	
KBGV	1240 AM	Monte Vista	Buffalo Broadcasting of Colorado, LLC	Country
KBIQ	102.7 FM	Manitou Springs	Bison Media, Inc.	Contemporary Christian
KBJD	1650 AM	Denver	Salem Media of Colorado, Inc.	Spanish Christian
KBKL	107.9 FM	Grand Junction	Townsquare License, LLC	Classic hits
KBKV	88.7 FM	Breckenridge	Educational Media Foundation	Contemporary Christian (K-Love)
KBLJ	1400 AM	La Junta	Thunder Media, Inc.	Classic hits
KBNO	1280 AM	Denver	Latino Communications, LLC	Regional Mexican
KBPI	107.9 FM	Fort Collins	iHM Licenses, LLC	Active rock
KBPL	107.9 FM	Pueblo	iHM Licenses, LLC	Active rock
KBUT	90.3 FM	Crested Butte	Crested Butte Mountain Educational Radio Inc	Public radio
KBVC	104.1 FM	Buena Vista	Three Eagles Communications of Colorado, LLC	Country
KBWA	89.1 FM	Brush	Hope Media Group	Contemporary Christian
KCCS	91.7 FM	Starkville	The Colorado College	Public radio
KCCY-FM	96.9 FM	Pueblo	iHM Licenses, LLC	Country
KCDC	102.5 FM	Loma	Cochise Media Licenses LLC	Silent
KCEG	890 AM	Fountain	Timothy C. Cutforth	Classic country
KCFC	1490 AM	Boulder	Public Broadcasting of Colorado, Inc.	Public/News/Talk
KCFP	91.9 FM	Pueblo	Public Broadcasting of Colorado, Inc.	Public/Classical
KCFR-FM	90.1 FM	Denver	Public Broadcasting of Colorado, Inc.	Public/News/Talk
KCGC	94.5 FM	Merino	Northeast Colorado Broadcasting, LLC	Country
KCIC	88.5 FM	Grand Junction	Pear Park Baptist Schools	Religious
KCIG-LP	99.7 FM	Craig	Colorado, State Of, Telecom Servs	Emergency Info
KCJX	88.9 FM	Carbondale	Roaring Fork Public Radio, Inc.	Variety
KCME	88.7 FM	Manitou Springs	Cheyenne Mountain Public Broadcast House, Inc	Classical
KCOL	600 AM	Wellington	iHM Licenses, LLC	News Talk Information
KCOQ	98.9 FM	Steamboat Springs	Radio Partners LLC	Classic rock
KCRN	1120 AM	Limon	Catholic Radio Network, Inc.	Catholic
KCRT	1240 AM	Trinidad	Phillips Broadcasting, Inc.	Adult hits
KCRT-FM	92.5 FM	Trinidad	Phillips Broadcasting, Inc.	Classic rock
KCSE	90.7 FM	Lamar	Kanza Society, Inc.	Public radio; News, Classical music, Jazz (High Plains Public Radio)
KCSF	1300 AM	Colorado Springs	Radio License Holding CBC, LLC	Sports (ISN)
KCSJ	590 AM	Pueblo	iHM Licenses, LLC	News/Talk
KCSU-FM	90.5 FM	Fort Collins	Board of Governors of the Colorado State University System	Variety/college
KCWA	93.9 FM	Loveland	Hope Media Group	Contemporary Christian
KDBN	101.1 FM	Parachute	KSUN Community Radio Corporation	Variety
KDCO	1340 AM	Denver	El Sembrador Ministries	Catholic
KDEA-LP	99.1 FM	Delta	Colorado, State Of, Telecom Servs	Emergency Info
KDFD	760 AM	Thornton	iHM Licenses, LLC	Conservative talk
KDGO	1240 AM	Durango	Hutton Broadcasting, LLC	News Talk Information
KDHT	95.7 FM	Denver	iHM Licenses, LLC	Top 40 (CHR)
KDMT	1690 AM	Arvada	Relevant Radio, Inc.	Catholic
KDNG	89.3 FM	Durango	Kute, Inc.	Public radio
KDNK	88.1 FM	Glenwood Springs	Carbondale Community Access Radio, Inc.	Variety/AAA
KDUR	91.9 FM	Durango	Board of Trustees for Fort Lewis College	College
KDVW-LP	100.9 FM	Montrose	Calvary Chapel of Montrose	Religious
KDZA	1230 AM	Pueblo	Colorado Radio Marketing, LLC	Classic hits
KEAE-LP	107.9 FM	Eagle	Colorado, State Of, Telecom Servs	Emergency Info
KECC	89.1 FM	La Junta	The Colorado College	Public radio
KEJJ	98.3 FM	Gunnison	John Harvey Rees	Classic hits
KEKB	99.9 FM	Fruita	Townsquare License, LLC	Country
KELS-LP	104.7 FM	Greeley	Plymouth Gathering Inc.	Variety
KENC	90.7 FM	Estes Park	Community Radio for Northern Colorado	Public radio
KEPC	89.7 FM	Colorado Springs	Pikes Peak Community College	Variety
KEPN	1600 AM	Lakewood	Bonneville International Corporation	Sports (ESPN)
KETO-LP	93.9 FM	Aurora	Ethiopian Community Television	Ethnic
KEXO	1230 AM	Grand Junction	Townsquare License, LLC	Regional Mexican/Talk
KEZZ	94.1 FM	Phippsburg	Blizzard Broadcasting II Colorado, LLC	Adult contemporary
KFCO	107.1 FM	Bennett	Pillar of Fire	Christian hip hop
KFCS	1580 AM	Colorado Springs	Greeley Broadcasting Corp.	Regional Mexican
KFEL	970 AM	Pueblo	Catholic Radio Network, Inc.	Catholic
KFEZ	101.3 FM	Walsenburg	Edward Magnus	1980s hits
KFFR	88.3 FM	Winter Park	Fraser Valley Community Media, Inc.	Community radio
KFKA	1310 AM	Greeley	Music Ventures, LLC, DBA Broadcast Media LLC	News/Talk
KFMU-FM	104.1 FM	Oak Creek	AlwaysMountainTime, LLC	Adult album alternative
KFRY	89.9 FM	Pueblo	Family Stations, Inc.	Religious (Family Radio)
KFTM	1400 AM	Fort Morgan	Media Logic, LLC	Classic hits
KFWA	103.1 FM	Weldona	Hope Media Group	Christian adult contemporary
KFXY	90.3 FM	Buena Vista	San Tan Educational Media	
KGCD	90.3 FM	Wray	The Praise Network, Inc.	Contemporary Christian
KGCY	89.1 FM	Cheyenne Wells	The Praise Network, Inc.	
KGFT	100.7 FM	Pueblo	Bison Media, Inc	Christian talk
KGHT	100.5 FM	El Jebel	Roaring Fork Broadcasting Company LLC	Top 40 (CHR)
KGIW	1450 AM	Alamosa	Wolf Creek Broadcasting, LLC	Classic hits
KGJN-LP	106.7 FM	Grand Junction	Colorado, State Of, Telecom Servs	Emergency Info
KGJX	101.5 FM	Fruita	Grand Junction Media, Inc.	Classic hits
KGKG	1340 AM	Salida	Headwaters Media, L.L.C.	1980s hits
KGLN	980 AM	Glenwood Springs	MBC Grand Broadcasting, Inc.	News/Talk
KGNI	88.7 FM	Gunnison	Crested Butte Mountain Educational Radio, Inc.	Public radio
KGNU	1390 AM	Denver	Boulder Community Broadcast Association, Inc.	Community radio
KGNU-FM	88.5 FM	Boulder	Boulder Community Broadcast Association, Inc.	Community radio
KGRE	1450 AM	Greeley	Greeley Broadcasting Corporation	Regional Mexican
KGRE-FM	102.1 FM	Estes Park	Greeley Broadcasting Corporation	Regional Mexican
KGUD	90.7 FM	Longmont	Longmont Community Radio	Adult standards
KGUS-LP	99.1 FM	Gunnison	Colorado, State Of, Telecom Servs	Emergency Info
KHCO	90.1 FM	Hayden	Educational Media Foundation	Worship music (Air1)
KHEN-LP	106.9 FM	Salida	Tenderfoot Transmitting, Inc.	Variety
KHNC	1360 AM	Johnstown	Excursion Broadcasting Network, LLC	Conservative News/Talk
KHOW	630 AM	Denver	iHM Licenses, LLC	News Talk Information
KHTU	88.1 FM	Wray	Home Town Radio	
KHUI	89.1 FM	Alamosa	Radio Bilingue, Inc.	Spanish News/Talk
KIBT	96.1 FM	Fountain	iHM Licenses, LLC	Rhythmic Top 40
KICO	89.5 FM	Rico	Community Radio Project	Public radio
KIDN-FM	95.9 FM	Hayden	AlwaysMountainTime, LLC	Hot adult contemporary
KIFT	106.3 FM	Kremmling	AlwaysMountainTime, LLC	Top 40 (CHR)
KIIX	1410 AM	Fort Collins	iHM Licenses, LLC	Classic country
KILO	94.3 FM	Colorado Springs	Colorado Springs Radio Broadcasters, Inc.	Active rock
KIMN	100.3 FM	Denver	KSE Radio Ventures, LLC	Hot adult contemporary
KIQN	103.3 FM	Colorado City	Pueblo Broadcasting Group LLC	Country
KIQX	101.3 FM	Durango	Four Corners Broadcasting, LLC	Hot adult contemporary
KISZ-FM	97.9 FM	Cortez	Hutton Broadcasting, LLC	Country
KIUP	930 AM	Durango	Four Corners Broadcasting, LLC	Sports (ESPN)
KIXD	1480 AM	Pueblo	Kix Broadcasting, LLC	Country
KJAC	105.5 FM	Timnath	Community Radio for Northern Colorado	Adult album alternative
KJBL	96.5 FM	Julesburg	Armada Media – McCook, Inc.	Classic hits
KJJD	1170 AM	Windsor	Rodriguez-Gallegos Broadcasting Corporation	Regional Mexican
KJLB	89.7 FM	Lamar	Great Plains Christian Radio, Inc.	Contemporary Christian
KJMN	92.1 FM	Castle Rock	Entravision Holdings, LLC	Spanish adult hits
KJMP	870 AM	Pierce	Brahmin Broadcasting Corporation	Classic hip hop
KJOL	620 AM	Grand Junction	United Ministries	Contemporary Christian
KJOL-FM	91.9 FM	Montrose	United Ministries	Christian
KJWA	89.7 FM	Trinidad	Hope Media Group	Contemporary Christian
KJYE	1400 AM	Delta	United Ministries	Christian
KKCH	92.7 FM	Glenwood Springs	AlwaysMountainTime, LLC	Hot adult contemporary
KKCL	1550 AM	Golden	Mainstreet Media of Colorado, LLC	Adult contemporary/Adult alternative
KKDC	93.3 FM	Dolores	Four Corners Broadcasting LLC	Album-oriented rock
KKDG	99.7 FM	Durango	Hutton Broadcasting, LLC	Adult album alternative
KKFL-LP	98.5 FM	Fowler	Town of Fowler Colorado	Variety
KKFM	98.1 FM	Colorado Springs	Radio License Holding CBC, LLC	Classic rock
KKFN	104.3 FM	Longmont	Bonneville International Corporation	Sports (ESPN)
KKLI	106.3 FM	Widefield	iHM Licenses, LLC	Adult contemporary
KKMG	98.9 FM	Pueblo	Radio License Holding CBC, LLC	Top 40 (CHR)
KKNN	95.1 FM	Delta	Townsquare License, LLC	Mainstream rock
KKPK	92.9 FM	Colorado Springs	Radio License Holding CBC, LLC	Adult contemporary
KKSB	1230 AM	Steamboat Springs	Blizzard Broadcasting LLC	News/Talk
KKSE	950 AM	Parker	KSE Radio Ventures, LLC	Sports gambling
KKSE-FM	92.5 FM	Broomfield	KSE Radio Ventures, LLC	Sports (FSR)
KKVM	104.7 FM	Vail	KNS Broadcasting, LLC	Adult album Alternative
KKVT	100.7 FM	Grand Junction	MBC Grand Broadcasting, Inc.	Adult hits
KKXK	94.1 FM	Montrose	Townsquare License, LLC	Country
KLBV	89.3 FM	Steamboat Springs	Educational Media Foundation	Contemporary Christian (K-Love)
KLCQ	88.5 FM	Trimble	Educational Media Foundation	Contemporary Christian (K-Love)
KLDC	1220 AM	Denver	KLZ Radio, Inc.	Christian talk
KLDV	91.1 FM	Morrison	Educational Media Foundation	Contemporary Christian (K-Love)
KLEV-LP	107.9 FM	Leadville	Colorado, State Of, Telecom Servs	Emergency Info
KLFV	90.3 FM	Grand Junction	Educational Media Foundation	Contemporary Christian (K-Love)
KLHQ	99.5 FM	Hotchkiss	Educational Media Foundation	Christian Contemporary (K-Love)
KLJH	107.1 FM	Bayfield	Native American Christian Voice, Inc.	Contemporary Inspirational
KLLV	550 AM	Breen	Daystar Radio, Ltd.	Christian radio
KLMQ	90.7 FM	Placerville	Educational Media Foundation	Contemporary Christian (K-Love)
KLMR	920 AM	Lamar	Riverside Communications, LLC	Classic country
KLMR-FM	93.5 FM	Lamar	Riverside Communications, LLC	Classic hits
KLNX-LP	107.9 FM	Minturn	Minturn Public Radio	Variety
KLRY	91.3 FM	Gypsum	Educational Media Foundation	Contemporary Christian (K-Love)
KLTT	670 AM	Commerce City	KLZ Radio, Inc.	Christian talk
KLVG	780 AM	Pueblo	Educational Media Foundation	Worship music (Air1)
KLVZ	810 AM	Brighton	KLZ Radio, Inc.	Soft oldies
KLXV	91.9 FM	Glenwood Springs	Educational Media Foundation	Contemporary Christian (K-Love)
KLZ	560 AM	Denver	KLZ Radio, Inc.	News Talk Information
KLZR	91.7 FM	Westcliffe	Wet Mountain Broadcasting Corp.	Variety
KLZV	91.3 FM	Brush	Educational Media Foundation	Contemporary Christian (K-Love)
KMAX-FM	94.3 FM	Wellington	Townsquare Media of Ft. Collins, Inc.	Mainstream rock
KMGJ	93.1 FM	Grand Junction	MBC Grand Broadcasting, Inc.	Top 40 (CHR)
KMKZ-LP	104.7 FM	Loveland	Protecting America's Future	Adult album alternative
KMOZ-FM	92.3 FM	Grand Junction	MBC Grand Broadcasting, Inc.	Country
KMPB	90.7 FM	Breckenridge	Community Radio for Northern Colorado	Public radio
KMPZ	88.1 FM	Salida	Cheyenne Mountain Public Broadcast House, Inc.	Classical
KMSA	91.3 FM	Grand Junction	Mesa State College	Adult album alternative
KMTE-LP	99.1 FM	Montrose	Colorado, State Of, Telecom Servs	Emergency Info
KMTS	99.1 FM	Glenwood Springs	Colorado West Broadcasting, Inc.	Country
KMXA	1090 AM	Aurora	Entravision Holdings, LLC	Regional Mexican
KMXY	104.3 FM	Grand Junction	Townsquare License, LLC	Hot adult contemporary
KMZK	106.9 FM	Clifton	Get Smashed Radio Broadcasting Network, LLC	Alternative rock
KNAB	1140 AM	Burlington	KNAB, Inc.	Adult standards
KNAB-FM	104.1 FM	Burlington	KNAB, Inc.	Country
KNAM	1490 AM	Silt	MBC Grand Broadcasting, Inc.	Oldies
KNDH	96.7 FM	Carbondale	Public Broadcasting of Colorado, Inc.	Adult album alternative
KNEC	100.9 FM	Yuma	Media Logic LLC	Adult contemporary
KNFO	106.1 FM	Basalt	AlwaysMountainTime, LLC	News Talk Information
KNNG	104.7 FM	Sterling	Media Logic LLC	Top 40
KNOZ	97.7 FM	Orchard Mesa	Paul Varecha	Adult hits
KNRV	1150 AM	Englewood	New Radio Venture, Inc.	Spanish News/Talk
KNUS	710 AM	Denver	Salem Media of Colorado, Inc.	News Talk Information
KNZZ	1100 AM	Grand Junction	MBC Grand Broadcasting, Inc.	News/Talk
KOA	850 AM	Denver	iHM Licenses, LLC	News/Talk
KOMF-LP	104.7 FM	Denver	Open Media Foundation	Variety
KOSI	101.1 FM	Denver	Bonneville International Corporation	Adult contemporary
KOTO	91.7 FM	Telluride	San Miguel Educational Fund, Inc.	Public radio / Variety
KOYC-LP	98.5 FM	Pueblo	Occupy The Roads	Variety
KPAU	107.3 FM	Center	Cochise Media Licenses LLC	College radio
KPCT-LP	106.7 FM	Parachute	Colorado, State Of, Telecom Servs	Emergency Info
KPGS	88.1 FM	Pagosa Springs	KUTE, Inc.	Adult album alternative
KPHT	95.5 FM	Rocky Ford	iHM Licenses, LLC	Classic hits
KPKE	1490 AM	Gunnison	John Harvey Rees	Country
KPLS	1510 AM	Littleton	Radio 74 Internationale	Religious (Radio 74 Internationale)
KPLS-FM	97.7 FM	Strasburg	Radio 74 Internationale	Religious (Radio 74 Internationale)
KPMX	105.7 FM	Sterling	Northeast Colorado Broadcasting LLC	Hot adult contemporary
KPOF	910 AM	Denver	Pillar of Fire	Christian
KPPF	1040 AM	Monument	Power 95.7, LLC	News/Talk
KPRB	106.3 FM	Brush	Northeast Colorado Broadcasting LLC	Adult contemporary
KPRE	89.9 FM	Vail	Public Broadcasting of Colorado, Inc.	Public/News/Talk
KPRH	88.3 FM	Montrose	Public Broadcasting of Colorado, Inc.	Public/News/Talk
KPRN	89.5 FM	Grand Junction	Public Broadcasting of Colorado, Inc.	Public/News/Talk
KPRU	103.3 FM	Delta	Public Broadcasting of Colorado, Inc.	Public/Classical
KPTE	92.9 FM	Bayfield	Hutton Broadcasting, LLC	Adult contemporary
KPVW	107.1 FM	Aspen	Entravision Holdings, LLC	Regional Mexican
KPYR	88.3 FM	Craig	Public Broadcasting of Colorado, Inc.	Public/News/Talk
KQKS	107.5 FM	Lakewood	Audacy License, LLC	Rhythmic contemporary
KQMT	99.5 FM	Denver	Audacy License, LLC	Classic rock
KQSC	1530 AM	Colorado Springs	Mountain Radio Group Inc.	Classic hits
KQSE	102.5 FM	Gypsum	AlwaysMountainTime, LLC	Spanish variety
KQZR	107.3 FM	Hayden	AlwaysMountainTime, LLC	Classic rock
KRAI	550 AM	Craig	Blizzard Broadcasting, LLC	Country
KRAI-FM	93.7 FM	Craig	Blizzard Broadcasting, LLC	Hot AC
KRCC	91.5 FM	Colorado Springs	The Colorado College	Public radio
KRCN	1060 AM	Longmont	Catholic Radio Network, Inc.	Catholic
KRDF	88.7 FM	Red Feather Lakes	Ridgeline Radio, Inc.	
KRDO	1240 AM	Colorado Springs	Pikes Peak Radio, LLC	News Talk Information
KRDO-FM	105.5 FM	Security	Pikes Peak Television, Inc.	News Talk Information
KRDS	104.1 FM	Silverton	MT Communications	Country
KRDZ	1440 AM	Wray	Media Logic, LLC	Classic hits
KREV-LP	104.7 FM	Estes Park	United Methodist Church of Estes Park	Variety
KRFC	88.9 FM	Fort Collins	Public Radio for the Front Range	Community radio
KRFD	100.1 FM	Fleming	Northeast Colorado Broadcasting, LLC	Contemporary Christian
KRFX	103.5 FM	Denver	iHM Licenses, LLC	Classic rock
KRHJ	88.3 FM	Lamar	KRH Educational Foundation	
KRJN	93.1 FM	Log Lane Village	Northeast Colorado Broadcasting, LLC	
KRKA	103.9 FM	Severance	Educational Media Foundation	Worship music (Air1)
KRKQ	95.5 FM	Mountain Village	Brown Mountain Broadcasting LLC	Smooth adult contemporary
KRKS	990 AM	Denver	Salem Media of Colorado, Inc.	Christian talk
KRKS-FM	94.7 FM	Lafayette	Salem Media of Colorado, Inc	Christian talk
KRKV	107.3 FM	Las Animas	Alleycat Communications	Classic rock
KRKY	930 AM	Granby	AlwaysMountainTime, LLC	Country
KRLG-LP	107.9 FM	Kremmling	Colorado, State Of, Telecom Servs	Emergency Info
KRLN	1400 AM	Canon City	Royal Gorge Broadcasting, LLC	News/Talk
KRNC	88.5 FM	Steamboat Springs	Community Radio of Northern Colorado	Public radio
KRNX	104.9 FM	Rye	Educational Media Foundation	Worship music (Air1)
KRSJ	100.5 FM	Durango	Four Corners Broadcasting, LLC	Country
KRTZ	98.7 FM	Cortez	Hutton Broadcasting, LLC	Adult contemporary
KRVG	95.5 FM	Glenwood Springs	Western Slope Communications, L.L.C.	Adult hits
KRWA	90.9 FM	Rye	Hope Media Group	Contemporary Christian
KRXP	103.9 FM	Pueblo West	Colorado Springs Radio Broadcasters, Inc	Alternative rock
KRYD	104.9 FM	Norwood	Rocky III Investments, Inc.	Adult hits
KRYE	94.7 FM	Beulah	Greeley Broadcasting Corporation	Classic hip hop
KRYJ	89.7 FM	Craig	San Tan Educational Media	
KRZA	88.7 FM	Alamosa	Equal Representation of Media Advocacy Corp.	Public radio
KRZX	106.1 FM	Redlands	Cochise Media Licenses LLC	Classic rock
KSBK	100.3 FM	Blanca	Mainstreet Broadcasting Company, Inc.	Country
KSBV	93.7 FM	Salida	Arkansas Valley Broadcasting, Inc.	Classic rock
KSIK-LP	95.3 FM	Greeley	Colorado Progressive Congregation	Variety
KSIR	1010 AM	Brush	Northeast Colorado Broadcasting LLC	News/Talk
KSJC-LP	92.5 FM	Silverton	Silverton Community Radio	Variety
KSJD	91.5 FM	Cortez	Community Radio Project, Inc.	Public radio
KSKE-FM	101.7 FM	Eagle	AlwaysMountainTime, LLC	Country
KSLV-FM	96.5 FM	Del Norte	Buffalo Broadcasting of Colorado, LLC	Classic rock
KSME	96.1 FM	Greeley	iHM Licenses, LLC	Top 40 (CHR)
KSMT	102.1 FM	Breckenridge	AlwaysMountainTime, LLC	Adult album alternative
KSNN	103.7 FM	Ridgway	Townsquare License, LLC	Top 40 (CHR)
KSNO-FM	103.9 FM	Snowmass Village	Wild Goose LLC	Adult album alternative
KSPK-FM	102.3 FM	Walsenburg	Mainstreet Broadcasting Company, Inc	Country
KSPN-FM	103.1 FM	Aspen	AlwaysMountainTime, LLC	Adult album alternative
KSRC	101.5 FM	Watkins	Pillar of Fire	Christian adult contemporary
KSRI	90.7 FM	Sterling	Educational Media Foundation	Worship music (Air1)
KSRX	97.5 FM	Sterling	Media Logic LLC	Adult hits
KSTC	1230 AM	Sterling	Media Logic LLC	Sports (FSR)
KSTH	92.3 FM	Holyoke	Armada Media – McCook, Inc.	Adult contemporary
KSTR-FM	96.1 FM	Montrose	MBC Grand Broadcasting, Inc.	Classic rock
KSTY	104.5 FM	Canon City	Royal Gorge Broadcasting, LLC	Defunct
KSUT	91.3 FM	Ignacio	KUTE, Inc.	Public radio
KSYF	107.5 FM	Olathe	Montrose Christian Broadcasting Corporation	Religious
KTAD	89.9 FM	Sterling	Educational Communications of Colorado Springs, Inc.	Contemporary Inspirational
KTAW	89.3 FM	Walsenburg	Educational Communications of Colorado Springs, Inc.	Contemporary Inspirational
KTCF	89.5 FM	Dolores	Educational Communications of Colorado Springs, Inc.	Contemporary Inspirational
KTCL	93.3 FM	Wheat Ridge	iHM Licenses, LLC	Alternative rock
KTDL	90.7 FM	Trinidad	Educational Communications of Colorado Springs, Inc.	Contemporary Inspirational
KTHN	92.1 FM	La Junta	Thunder Media, Inc.	Country
KTLC	89.1 FM	Canon City	Educational Communications of Colorado Springs, Inc.	Contemporary Inspirational
KTLF	90.5 FM	Colorado Springs	Educational Communications of Colorado Springs, Inc.	Contemporary Inspirational
KTMH	89.9 FM	Colona	Educational Communications of Colorado Springs, Inc.	Contemporary Inspirational
KTML	91.9 FM	South Fork	Educational Communications of Colorado Springs, Inc.	Contemporary Inspirational
KTMM	1340 AM	Grand Junction	MBC Grand Broadcasting, Inc.	Sports (ISN)
KTND	93.5 FM	Aspen	Roaring Fork Broadcasting Company LLC	Classic hits
KTOL	90.9 FM	Leadville	Educational Communications of Colorado Springs, Inc.	Contemporary Inspirational
KTPF	91.3 FM	Salida	Educational Communications of Colorado Springs, Inc.	Contemporary Inspirational
KTPJ-LP	105.9 FM	Pueblo	Hope Radio of Pueblo Corporation	Religious (LifeTalk Radio)
KTPL	88.3 FM	Pueblo	Educational Communications of Colorado Springs, Inc.	Christian talk & music
KTPS	89.7 FM	Pagosa Springs	Educational Communications of Colorado Springs, Inc.	Contemporary Inspirational
KTRR	102.5 FM	Loveland	Townsquare Media of Ft. Collins, Inc.	Classic hits
KTSC-FM	89.5 FM	Pueblo	Board of Governors of the Colorado State University System	Adult hits
KTSG	91.7 FM	Steamboat Springs	Educational Communications of Colorado Springs, Inc.	Contemporary inspirational
KTUN	94.5 FM	New Castle	AlwaysMountainTime, LLC	Spanish hits
KTYV	105.7 FM	Steamboat Springs	Blizzard Broadcasting LLC	Sports
KUAD-FM	99.1 FM	Windsor	Townsquare Media of Ft. Collins, Inc.	Country
KUBC	580 AM	Montrose	Townsquare License, LLC	Classic rock
KUBE	1350 AM	Pueblo	iHM Licenses, LLC	Sports (FSR)
KUNC	91.5 FM	Greeley	Community Radio for Northern Colorado	Public radio
KURA-LP	98.9 FM	Ouray	Ouray School District R1	Variety
KUTE	90.1 FM	Ignacio	KUTE, Inc.	Public radio
KUVO	89.3 FM	Denver	Rocky Mountain Public Broadcasting Network, Inc.	Jazz/Public
KVAY	105.7 FM	Lamar	Beacon Broadcasting LLC	Country
KVBV	1450 AM	Buena Vista	High Plains Radio Network, LLC	News/Talk
KVCU	1190 AM	Boulder	The Regents of the University of Colorado	Independent/College radio
KVFC	740 AM	Cortez	Hutton Broadcasting, LLC	News Talk Information
KVLE-FM	102.3 FM	Gunnison	Bobcat Radio, Inc.	Adult contemporary
KVMT	89.1 FM	Montrose	North Fork Valley Public Radio, Inc.	Public radio
KVNC	90.9 FM	Minturn	Community Radio for Northern Colorado	Public radio
KVNF	90.9 FM	Paonia	North Fork Valley Public Radio, Inc.	Public radio
KVOD	88.1 FM	Lakewood	PRC Denver-I, LLC	Public/Classical
KVOQ	102.3 FM	Greenwood Village	Public Broadcasting of Colorado, Inc.	Adult album alternative
KVOR	740 AM	Colorado Springs	Radio License Holding CBC, LLC	News/Talk
KVOV	90.5 FM	Carbondale	Public Broadcasting of Colorado, Inc.	Public/Classical
KVQI	88.5 FM	Vail	Public Broadcasting of Colorado, Inc.	Adult album alternative
KVRH-FM	92.3 FM	Salida	Three Eagles Communications of Colorado, LLC	Adult album alternative
KVUU	99.9 FM	Pueblo	iHM Licenses, LLC	Hot adult contemporary
KVXO	88.3 FM	Fort Collins	Public Broadcasting of Colorado, Inc.	Public/Classical
KWBL	106.7 FM	Denver	iHM Licenses, LLC	Country
KWCC-FM	89.5 FM	Woodland Park	The Colorado College	Oldies/Jazz
KWGL	105.7 FM	Ouray	WS Communications, LLC	Classic country
KWRP	690 AM	Pueblo	Western Radio, Ltd.	Rhythmic oldies
KWRY	106.9 FM	Pueblo	Educational Media Foundation	Contemporary Christian (K-Love)
KWSB-FM	91.1 FM	Gunnison	Western State College of Colorado	College
KWSI-LP	100.3 FM	Grand Junction	Community Resources for Action Volunteerism and Education	Variety
KWUF	1400 AM	Pagosa Springs	Wolf Creek Broadcasting, LLC	Country
KWUF-FM	106.1 FM	Pagosa Springs	Wolf Creek Broadcasting, LLC	Adult hits
KWUZ	97.5 FM	Poncha Springs	Three Eagles Communications of Colorado, LLC	Classic hits
KXCL	101.7 FM	Rock Creek Park	Calvary Chapel Aurora	Contemporary Christian
KXGR	89.7 FM	Loveland	Calvary Chapel Aurora	Contemporary Christian
KXJJ	1570 AM	Loveland	Spanish Media Consulting Corporation	Catholic
KXKL-FM	105.1 FM	Denver	KSE Radio Ventures, LLC	Classic hits
KXPK	96.5 FM	Evergreen	Entravision Holdings, LLC	Regional Mexican
KXRC	105.3 FM	Durango	KRJ Company	Classic rock
KXRE	1490 AM	Manitou Springs	Public Broadcasting of Colorado, Inc.	Adult album alternative
KXWA	101.9 FM	Centennial	Hope Media Group	Contemporary Christian
KYAP	96.9 FM	Nunn	Appaloosa Broadcasting Company, Inc.	Regional Mexican
KYDN	95.3 FM	Monte Vista	Buffalo Broadcasting of Colorado, LLC	Country
KYGO-FM	98.5 FM	Denver	Bonneville International Corporation	Country
KYGT-LP	102.7 FM	Idaho Springs	Clear Creek Radio, Inc.	Variety
KYSL	93.9 FM	Frisco	Krystal Broadcasting, Incorporated	Adult album alternative
KZBR	97.1 FM	La Jara	Wolf Creek Broadcasting, LLC	Adult hits
KZET	90.5 FM	Towaoc	Community Radio Project	Public radio
KZKS	105.3 FM	Rifle	Western Slope Communications, L.L.C.	Classic rock
KZLJ-LP	102.1 FM	La Junta	DJMH Incorporated	Rhythmic adult contemporary
KZNM	100.9 FM	Towaoc	KUTE, Inc.	
KZNT	1460 AM	Colorado Springs	Bison Media, Inc.	News/Talk
KZYR	97.7 FM	Avon	KNS Broadcasting, LLC	Alternative rock

== Defunct stations ==
- KADZ
- KAMV-LP
- KBFR (pirate radio)
- KBUD (FM)
- KCMJ-LP
- KCQX-LP
- KDEB (AM)
- KDEY
- KKCS (FM)
- KKHG
- KMZG-LP
- KRGS
- KSBP-LP
- KVLE (AM)
- KWIR-LP
- KWMV-LP

== See also ==
- Bibliography of Colorado
- Geography of Colorado
- History of Colorado
- Index of Colorado-related articles
- List of Colorado-related lists
- Outline of Colorado
