= Mass media in Grand Junction, Colorado =

Grand Junction is a center of media in western Colorado. The following is a list of media outlets based in the city.

== Print ==
=== Newspapers ===
The Grand Junction Daily Sentinel is the city's primary newspaper, published daily. Other newspapers published in the city include:

- Beacon, seniors' lifestyle, monthly
- The Business Times, business news, twice monthly
- The Criterion, Colorado Mesa University student newspaper, weekly
- Grand Junction Free Press, weekly

== Radio ==
The Grand Junction radio market covers all of Mesa County, Colorado. In its Fall 2013 ranking of radio markets by population, Arbitron ranked the Grand Junction market 248th in the United States.

The following is a list of radio stations that broadcast from and/or are licensed to Grand Junction.

=== AM ===
Frequency	Callsign	Format	City of License	Notes
620	KJOL	Christian Contemporary	Grand Junction, Colorado	-
690	KRGS	Sports	Rifle, Colorado	Broadcasts from Grand Junction
1100	KNZZ	News/Talk	Grand Junction, Colorado	-
1230	KEXO	Talk	Grand Junction, Colorado	-
1340	KTMM	Sports	Grand Junction, Colorado	-
1400	KJYE	Christian Contemporary	Delta, Colorado	Broadcasts from Grand Junction

=== FM ===
Frequency	Callsign	Format	City of License	Notes
88.1	KAFM	Variety	Grand Junction, Colorado	-
88.5	KCIC	Religious	Grand Junction, Colorado	-
88.9	K205CK	Religious	Grand Junction, Colorado	Translator of KAWZ, Twin Falls, Idaho
89.5	KPRN	Public	Grand Junction, Colorado	NPR; Satellite station of KCFR-FM, Denver, Colorado
90.3	KLFV	Christian Contemporary	Grand Junction, Colorado	K-LOVE
90.7	K214CA	Religious	Grand Junction, Colorado	Translator of KEBR, Sacramento, California
91.3	KMSA	Adult Album Alternative	Grand Junction, Colorado	Colorado Mesa University college radio
91.7	K219DH	Religious	Grand Junction, Colorado	Translator of WFCS, Pensacola, Florida
92.3	KMOZ-FM	Country	Grand Junction, Colorado	-
93.1	KMGJ	Top 40	Grand Junction, Colorado	-
93.7	K229AH	Religious	Grand Junction, Colorado	Translator of KTMH, Montrose, Colorado
94.3	KGJX HD3	Classic Hip Hop	Fruita, Colorado	Broadcasts out of GJ Media, Inc. located in Grand Junction, CO
95.1	KKNN	Active Rock	Delta, Colorado	Broadcasts from Grand Junction
96.1	KSTR-FM	Classic Rock	Montrose, Colorado	Broadcasts from Grand Junction
97.3	K247BK	Classic Country	Grand Junction, Colorado	Translator of KWGL
97.7	KNOZ	Adult Hits	Orchard Mesa, Colorado	Broadcasts from Grand Junction
99.5	K258BP	Christian Contemporary	Grand Junction, Colorado	Translator of KJOL
99.9	KEKB	Country	Fruita, Colorado	Broadcasts from Grand Junction
100.3	KWSI-LP	Community/Variety	Grand Junction, Colorado	Low power, nonprofit
100.7	KKVT	Adult Hits	Grand Junction, Colorado	-
101.5	KGJX HD1	Classic Hits	Fruita, Colorado	Broadcasts out of GJ Media, Inc. located in Grand Junction, CO
104.3	KMXY	Hot Adult Contemporary	Grand Junction, Colorado	-
104.7	KGJX HD2	Spanish-Based Hits	Fruita, Colorado	Broadcasts out of GJ Media, Inc. located in Grand Junction, CO
104.9	KRYD	Adult Hits	Norwood, Colorado	Broadcasts from Grand Junction
105.3	KZKS	Classic Rock	Rifle, Colorado	Broadcasts from Grand Junction
105.7	KWGL	Classic Country	Ouray, Colorado	Broadcasts from Grand Junction
106.7	KGJN-LP	News/Talk	Grand Junction, Colorado	-
106.9	KMZK	Alternative Rock	Clifton, Colorado	Broadcasts from Fruita
107.3	KGJX HD4	Classic Country	Fruita, Colorado	Broadcasts out of GJ Media, Inc. located in Grand Junction, CO
107.9	KBKL	Classic Hits	Grand Junction, Colorado	

== Television ==
The Grand Junction television market includes two counties in western Colorado, Mesa County and Montrose County. In its Fall 2013 ranking of television markets by population, Arbitron ranked the Grand Junction market 185th in the United States.

The following is a list of television stations that broadcast from and/or are licensed to Grand Junction.

Display Channel	Network	Callsign	City of License	Notes
4.1	FOX	KFQX	Grand Junction, Colorado	-
4.2	CBS	KFQX	Grand Junction, Colorado	Standard-definition; Simulcast of KREY, Montrose, Colorado
5.1	CBS	KREX-TV	Grand Junction, Colorado	-
5.2	MyNetworkTV	KREX-TV	Grand Junction, Colorado	Simulcast of KGJT-CD
5.3	CBS	KREX-TV	Grand Junction, Colorado	Simulcast of KREG, Glenwood Springs, Colorado
8.1	ABC	KJCT-LP	Grand Junction, Colorado	-
8.2	CW	KJCT-LP	Grand Junction, Colorado	-
11.1	NBC	KKCO	Grand Junction, Colorado	-
11.2	Me-TV	KKCO	Grand Junction, Colorado	-
11.3	Telemundo	KKCO	Grand Junction, Colorado	-
18.1	PBS	KRMJ	Grand Junction, Colorado	Satellite station of KRMA-TV, Denver, Colorado
18.2	PBS Kids	KRMJ	Grand Junction, Colorado	Satellite station of KRMA-TV, Denver, Colorado
18.3	Create/World	KRMJ	Grand Junction, Colorado	Satellite station of KRMA-TV, Denver, Colorado
18.5	AINC	KRMJ	Grand Junction, Colorado	Audio only
20.1	Cozi TV	KLML	Grand Junction, Colorado	-
22.1	Movies!	K22JN-D	Grand Junction, Colorado	-
27.1	MyNetworkTV	KGJT-CD	Grand Junction, Colorado	-
27.2	CBS	KGJT-CD	Grand Junction, Colorado	Simulcast of KREX-TV
38.1	EICB TV	K38JX-D	Grand Junction, Colorado	-
