= List of FM radio stations in the United States by call sign (initial letters KK–KM) =

This is a list of FM radio stations in the United States having call signs beginning with the letters KK through KM. Low-power FM radio stations, those with designations such as KKAS-LP, have not been included in this list.

== KK-- ==
Callsign	Frequency	City of license
KKAG	88.3 FM	Grangeville, Idaho
KKAJ-FM	95.7 FM	Davis, Oklahoma
KKAL	92.5 FM	Paso Robles, California
KKBA	92.7 FM	Kingsville, Texas
KKBB	99.3 FM	Bakersfield, California
KKBD	95.9 FM	Sallisaw, Oklahoma
KKBG	97.9 FM	Hilo, Hawaii
KKBI	106.1 FM	Broken Bow, Oklahoma
KKBJ-FM	103.7 FM	Bemidji, Minnesota
KKBL	95.9 FM	Monett, Missouri
KKBN	93.5 FM	Twain Harte, California
KKBO	105.9 FM	Flasher, North Dakota
KKBQ	92.9 FM	Pasadena, Texas
KKBR	97.1 FM	Billings, Montana
KKBS	92.7 FM	Guymon, Oklahoma
KKBT	104.7 FM	Leone, American Samoa
KKBZ	105.1 FM	Auberry, California
KKCB	105.1 FM	Duluth, Minnesota
KKCD	105.9 FM	Omaha, Nebraska
KKCH	92.7 FM	Glenwood Springs, Colorado
KKCK	99.7 FM	Marshall, Minnesota
KKCL	98.1 FM	Lorenzo, Texas
KKCN	103.1 FM	Ballinger, Texas
KKCQ-FM	96.7 FM	Bagley, Minnesota
KKCR	90.9 FM	Hanalei, Hawaii
KKCT	97.5 FM	Bismarck, North Dakota
KKCV	102.5 FM	Rozel, Kansas
KKCW	103.3 FM	Beaverton, Oregon
KKCY	103.1 FM	Colusa, California
KKDA-FM	104.5 FM	Dallas, Texas
KKDC	93.3 FM	Dolores, Colorado
KKDG	99.7 FM	Durango, Colorado
KKDL	93.7 FM	Dilley, Texas
KKDM	107.5 FM	Des Moines, Iowa
KKDO	94.7 FM	Fair Oaks, California
KKDQ	99.3 FM	Thief River Falls, Minnesota
KKDT	93.5 FM	Burdett, Kansas
KKDV	92.1 FM	Walnut Creek, California
KKDY	102.5 FM	West Plains, Missouri
KKED	104.7 FM	Fairbanks, Alaska
KKEG	98.3 FM	Bentonville, Arkansas
KKEH	91.7 FM	Ponderay, Idaho
KKEN	97.1 FM	Duncan, Oklahoma
KKEQ	107.1 FM	Fosston, Minnesota
KKER	88.7 FM	Kerrville, Texas
KKET	95.9 FM	Allakaket, Alaska
KKEX	96.7 FM	Preston, Idaho
KKEZ	94.5 FM	Fort Dodge, Iowa
KKFD-FM	95.9 FM	Fairfield, Iowa
KKFG	104.5 FM	Bloomfield, New Mexico
KKFI	90.1 FM	Kansas City, Missouri
KKFM	98.1 FM	Colorado Springs, Colorado
KKFN	104.3 FM	Longmont, Colorado
KKFR	98.3 FM	Mayer, Arizona
KKFT	99.1 FM	Gardnerville-Minden, Nevada
KKGB	101.3 FM	Sulphur, Louisiana
KKGL	96.9 FM	Nampa, Idaho
KKGO-FM	105.1 FM	Los Angeles
KKGQ	92.3 FM	Newton, Kansas
KKGT	95.1 FM	Jacksonville, Texas
KKHA	92.5 FM	Markham, Texas
KKHB	105.5 FM	Eureka, California
KKHH	95.7 FM	Houston, Texas
KKHI	95.9 FM	Kaunakakai, Hawaii
KKHJ-FM	93.1 FM	Pago Pago, American Samoa
KKHK	95.5 FM	Carmel, California
KKHQ-FM	98.5 FM	Cedar Falls, Iowa
KKHR	106.3 FM	Abilene, Texas
KKHT-FM	100.7 FM	Lumberton, Texas
KKIA	92.9 FM	Ida Grove, Iowa
KKID	92.9 FM	Salem, Missouri
KKIK	106.5 FM	Horseshoe Bend, Arkansas
KKIN-FM	94.3 FM	Aitkin, Minnesota
KKIQ	101.7 FM	Livermore, California
KKIS-FM	96.5 FM	Soldotna, Alaska
KKIT	95.9 FM	Taos, New Mexico
KKIX	103.9 FM	Fayetteville, Arkansas
KKJA	89.9 FM	Redmond, Oregon
KKJD	91.3 FM	Borrego Springs, California
KKJG	98.1 FM	San Luis Obispo, California
KKJJ	88.5 FM	Diamond City, Arkansas
KKJK	103.1 FM	Ravenna, Nebraska
KKJM	92.9 FM	Saint Joseph, Minnesota
KKJO-FM	105.5 FM	St. Joseph, Missouri
KKJQ	97.3 FM	Garden City, Kansas
KKJZ	88.1 FM	Long Beach, California
KKKJ	105.5 FM	Merrill, Oregon
KKLA-FM	99.5 FM	Los Angeles
KKLB	89.1 FM	Bartlesville, Oklahoma
KKLC	107.9 FM	Fall River Mills, California
KKLD	95.9 FM	Cottonwood, Arizona
KKLG	88.3 FM	Newton, Iowa
KKLH	104.7 FM	Marshfield, Missouri
KKLI	106.3 FM	Widefield, Colorado
KKLJ	100.1 FM	Julian, California
KKLK	89.3 FM	Savoonga, Alaska
KKLM	104.1 FM	Murrieta, California
KKLN	94.1 FM	Atwater, Minnesota
KKLP	91.1 FM	Perris, California
KKLQ	100.3 FM	Los Angeles
KKLR-FM	94.5 FM	Poplar Bluff, Missouri
KKLS-FM	104.7 FM	Sioux Falls, South Dakota
KKLT	89.3 FM	Texarkana, Arkansas
KKLU	90.9 FM	Lubbock, Texas
KKLV	107.5 FM	Kaysville, Utah
KKLW	90.9 FM	Willmar, Minnesota
KKLX	96.1 FM	Worland, Wyoming
KKLY	89.5 FM	El Paso, Texas
KKLZ	96.3 FM	Las Vegas, Nevada
KKMA	99.5 FM	Le Mars, Iowa
KKMG	98.9 FM	Pueblo, Colorado
KKMI	93.5 FM	Burlington, Iowa
KKMJ-FM	95.5 FM	Austin, Texas
KKMK	93.9 FM	Rapid City, South Dakota
KKMR	106.5 FM	Arizona City, Arizona
KKMT	92.3 FM	Ronan, Montana
KKMV	106.1 FM	Rupert, Idaho
KKMX	104.3 FM	Tri City, Oregon
KKMY	104.5 FM	Orange, Texas
KKND	106.7 FM	Port Sulphur, Louisiana
KKNG-FM	97.3 FM	Blanchard, Oklahoma
KKNI-FM	105.3 FM	Sterling, Alaska
KKNL	89.3 FM	Valentine, Nebraska
KKNM	96.5 FM	Bovina, Texas
KKNN	95.1 FM	Delta, Colorado
KKNU	93.3 FM	Springfield-Eugene, Oregon
KKOA	107.7 FM	Volcano, Hawaii
KKOB-FM	96.3 FM	Albuquerque, New Mexico
KKOK-FM	95.7 FM	Morris, Minnesota
KKOL-FM	107.9 FM	Aiea, Hawaii
KKOT	93.5 FM	Columbus, Nebraska
KKOW-FM	96.9 FM	Pittsburg, Kansas
KKOY-FM	105.5 FM	Chanute, Kansas
KKOZ-FM	92.1 FM	Ava, Missouri
KKPK	92.9 FM	Colorado Springs, Colorado
KKPL	99.9 FM	Cheyenne, Wyoming
KKPN	102.3 FM	Rockport, Texas
KKPR-FM	98.9 FM	Kearney, Nebraska
KKPS	99.5 FM	Brownsville, Texas
KKPT	94.1 FM	Little Rock, Arkansas
KKQA	88.1 FM	Akutan, Alaska
KKQQ	102.3 FM	Volga, South Dakota
KKQX	105.7 FM	Manhattan, Montana
KKQY	101.9 FM	Hill City, Kansas
KKRB	106.9 FM	Klamath Falls, Oregon
KKRC-FM	97.3 FM	Sioux Falls, South Dakota
KKRD	91.1 FM	Enid, Oklahoma
KKRF	107.9 FM	Stuart, Iowa
KKRG-FM	105.1 FM	Santa Fe, New Mexico
KKRH	90.9 FM	Grangeville, Idaho
KKRI	88.1 FM	Pocola, Oklahoma
KKRL	93.7 FM	Carroll, Iowa
KKRN	88.5 FM	Bella Vista, California
KKRO	102.7 FM	Red Bluff, California
KKRQ	100.7 FM	Iowa City, Iowa
KKRS	97.3 FM	Davenport, Washington
KKRV	104.7 FM	Wenatchee, Washington
KKRZ	100.3 FM	Portland, Oregon
KKSD	104.3 FM	Milbank, South Dakota
KKSE-FM	92.5 FM	Broomfield, Colorado
KKSI	101.5 FM	Eddyville, Iowa
KKSO	88.9 FM	Mitchellville, Iowa
KKSP	93.3 FM	Bryant, Arkansas
KKSR	95.7 FM	Walla Walla, Washington
KKSS	97.3 FM	Santa Fe, New Mexico
KKST	98.7 FM	Oakdale, Louisiana
KKSW	105.9 FM	Lawrence, Kansas
KKSY-FM	96.5 FM	Cedar Rapids, Iowa
KKTC	99.9 FM	Angel Fire, New Mexico
KKTO	90.5 FM	Tahoe City, California
KKTR	89.7 FM	Kirksville, Missouri
KKTS-FM	99.3 FM	Douglas, Wyoming
KKTU-FM	99.5 FM	Fallon, Nevada
KKTX-FM	96.1 FM	Kilgore, Texas
KKTY-FM	100.1 FM	Glendo, Wyoming
KKTZ	107.5 FM	Mountain Home, Arkansas
KKUA	90.7 FM	Wailuku, Hawaii
KKUP	91.5 FM	Cupertino, California
KKUS	104.1 FM	Tyler, Texas
KKUT	93.7 FM	Mount Pleasant, Utah
KKUU	92.7 FM	Indio, California
KKVM	104.7 FM	Vail, Colorado
KKVO	90.9 FM	Altus, Oklahoma
KKVR	106.1 FM	Kerrville, Texas
KKVT	100.7 FM	Grand Junction, Colorado
KKVU	104.5 FM	Stevensville, Montana
KKWA	96.3 FM	West Linn, Oregon
KKWB	102.5 FM	Kelliher, Minnesota
KKWD	104.9 FM	Bethany, Oklahoma
KKWE	89.9 FM	White Earth, Minnesota
KKWF	100.7 FM	Seattle, Washington
KKWG	93.3 FM	Kongiganak, Alaska
KKWK	100.1 FM	Cameron, Missouri
KKWL	97.7 FM	Butte Falls, Oregon
KKWN	106.7 FM	Cashmere, Washington
KKWQ	92.5 FM	Warroad, Minnesota
KKWS	105.9 FM	Wadena, Minnesota
KKWV	88.1 FM	Aransas Pass, Texas
KKWY	88.1 FM	Wheatland, Wyoming
KKWZ	95.3 FM	Rugby, North Dakota
KKXK	94.1 FM	Montrose, Colorado
KKXL-FM	92.9 FM	Grand Forks, North Dakota
KKXT	91.7 FM	Dallas, Texas
KKXX-FM	93.1 FM	Shafter, California
KKYA	93.1 FM	Yankton, South Dakota
KKYN-FM	106.9 FM	Plainview, Texas
KKYR-FM	102.5 FM	Texarkana, Texas
KKYS	104.7 FM	Bryan, Texas
KKYY	101.3 FM	Whiting, Iowa
KKYZ	101.7 FM	Sierra Vista, Arizona
KKZQ	100.1 FM	Tehachapi, California
KKZU	101.7 FM	Sayre, Oklahoma
KKZX	98.9 FM	Spokane, Washington
KKZY	95.5 FM	Bemidji, Minnesota

== KL-- ==
Callsign	Frequency	City of license
KLAA-FM	103.5 FM	Tioga, Louisiana
KLAB	101.1 FM	Siloam Springs, Arkansas
KLAD-FM	92.5 FM	Klamath Falls, Oregon
KLAG	91.7 FM	Alamogordo, New Mexico
KLAI	90.3 FM	Laytonville, California
KLAK	97.5 FM	Tom Bean, Texas
KLAL	107.7 FM	Wrightsville, Arkansas
KLAN	93.5 FM	Glasgow, Montana
KLAP	89.5 FM	Gerlach, Nevada
KLAQ	95.5 FM	El Paso, Texas
KLAW	101.3 FM	Lawton, Oklahoma
KLAX-FM	97.9 FM	East Los Angeles, California
KLAZ	105.9 FM	Hot Springs, Arkansas
KLBB-FM	93.7 FM	Lubbock, Texas
KLBC	106.3 FM	Durant, Oklahoma
KLBD	88.1 FM	Premont, Texas
KLBF	89.1 FM	Lincoln, North Dakota
KLBG	95.5 FM	Lindsborg, Kansas
KLBJ-FM	93.7 FM	Austin, Texas
KLBL	101.5 FM	Malvern, Arkansas
KLBN	101.9 FM	Fresno, California
KLBQ	101.5 FM	Junction City, Arkansas
KLBR	88.1 FM	Bend, Oregon
KLBT	88.1 FM	Beaumont, Texas
KLBU	94.7 FM	Santa Fe, New Mexico
KLBV	89.3 FM	Steamboat Springs, Colorado
KLBY-FM	98.9 FM	Albany, Texas
KLBZ	89.3 FM	Bozeman, Montana
KLCA	96.5 FM	Tahoe City, California
KLCC	89.7 FM	Eugene, Oregon
KLCD	89.5 FM	Decorah, Iowa
KLCE	97.3 FM	Blackfoot, Idaho
KLCF	91.1 FM	Truth or Consequences, New Mexico
KLCH	94.9 FM	Lake City, Minnesota
KLCI	106.1 FM	Elk River, Minnesota
KLCJ	104.1 FM	Oak Grove, Louisiana
KLCM	88.1 FM	Ulysses, Kansas
KLCO	90.5 FM	Newport, Oregon
KLCQ	88.5 FM	Durango, Colorado
KLCR	95.3 FM	Lakeview, Oregon
KLCU	90.3 FM	Ardmore, Oklahoma
KLCV	88.5 FM	Lincoln, Nebraska
KLCY	105.5 FM	Vernal, Utah
KLCZ	88.9 FM	Lewiston, Idaho
KLDD	91.9 FM	McCloud, California
KLDE	104.9 FM	Eldorado, Texas
KLDG	102.7 FM	Liberal, Kansas
KLDJ	101.7 FM	Duluth, Minnesota
KLDN	88.9 FM	Lufkin, Texas
KLDQ	100.7 FM	Harwood, North Dakota
KLDR	98.3 FM	Harbeck-Fruitdale, Oregon
KLDV	91.1 FM	Morrison, Colorado
KLDX	88.5 FM	Sioux Center, Iowa
KLDZ	103.5 FM	Medford, Oregon
KLEA	95.7 FM	Hobbs, New Mexico
KLEC	90.5 FM	Liberal, Kansas
KLED	93.3 FM	Antelope Valley–Crestview, Wyoming
KLEF	98.1 FM	Anchorage, Alaska
KLEN	106.3 FM	Cheyenne, Wyoming
KLEO	106.1 FM	Kahaluu, Hawaii
KLER-FM	95.1 FM	Orofino, Idaho
KLEU	91.1 FM	Lewistown, Montana
KLEY-FM	95.7 FM	Jourdanton, Texas
KLFC	88.1 FM	Branson, Missouri
KLFF	89.3 FM	San Luis Obispo, California
KLFG	89.5 FM	Fort Dodge, Iowa
KLFH	90.7 FM	Fort Smith, Arkansas
KLFJ	105.3 FM	Hoxie, Arkansas
KLFM	92.9 FM	Great Falls, Montana
KLFN	106.5 FM	Sunburg, Minnesota
KLFO	88.1 FM	Florence, Oregon
KLFR	89.1 FM	Reedsport, Oregon
KLFS	90.3 FM	Van Buren, Arkansas
KLFT	90.5 FM	Kaplan, Louisiana
KLFV	90.3 FM	Grand Junction, Colorado
KLFX	107.3 FM	Nolanville, Texas
KLFZ	102.3 FM	Jacksonville, Texas
KLGA-FM	92.7 FM	Algona, Iowa
KLGD	106.9 FM	Stamford, Texas
KLGE	94.1 FM	Hydesville, California
KLGG	89.3 FM	Kellogg, Idaho
KLGL	94.5 FM	Salina, Utah
KLGR-FM	97.7 FM	Redwood Falls, Minnesota
KLGS	89.9 FM	College Station, Texas
KLGT	92.9 FM	Buffalo, Wyoming
KLGU	90.3 FM	Saint George, Utah
KLGW	98.5 FM	Grand Coulee, Washington
KLHB	105.5 FM	Portland, Texas
KLHI-FM	92.5 FM	Kahului, Hawaii
KLHK	88.3 FM	Hobbs, New Mexico
KLHQ	99.5 FM	Hotchkiss, Colorado
KLHT-FM	91.5 FM	Honolulu, Hawaii
KLHV	88.5 FM	Cotton Valley, Louisiana
KLHY	91.1 FM	Kailua, Hawaii
KLIL	92.1 FM	Moreauville, Louisiana
KLIP	105.3 FM	Monroe, Louisiana
KLIQ	94.5 FM	Hastings, Nebraska
KLIR	101.1 FM	Columbus, Nebraska
KLIT	93.3 FM	Ranchitos Las Lomas, Texas
KLIX-FM	96.5 FM	Twin Falls, Idaho
KLIZ-FM	107.5 FM	Brainerd, Minnesota
KLJA	107.7 FM	Georgetown, Texas
KLJH	107.1 FM	Bayfield, Colorado
KLJK	94.7 FM	Weiner, Arkansas
KLJN	105.9 FM	Coos Bay, Oregon
KLJR-FM	96.7 FM	Santa Paula, California
KLJV	88.3 FM	Scottsbluff, Nebraska
KLJY	99.1 FM	Clayton, Missouri
KLJZ	93.1 FM	Yuma, Arizona
KLKA	88.5 FM	Globe, Arizona
KLKC-FM	93.5 FM	Parsons, Kansas
KLKE	103.7 FM	Garberville, California
KLKF	100.7 FM	Malin, Oregon
KLKI	89.9 FM	Bullhead City, Arizona
KLKK	103.7 FM	Clear Lake, Iowa
KLKL	95.7 FM	Minden, Louisiana
KLKM	88.7 FM	Kalispell, Montana
KLKO	93.7 FM	Elko, Nevada
KLKR	89.3 FM	Elko, Nevada
KLKS	100.1 FM	Pequot Lakes, Minnesota
KLKV	99.9 FM	Hunt, Texas
KLKY	96.1 FM	Stanfield, Oregon
KLLC	97.3 FM	San Francisco, California
KLLE	107.9 FM	North Fork, California
KLLI	93.9 FM	Los Angeles, California
KLLL-FM	96.3 FM	Lubbock, Texas
KLLM	96.5 FM	Wheatland, Wyoming
KLLN	90.9 FM	Newark, Arkansas
KLLP	98.5 FM	Blackfoot, Idaho
KLLR	91.9 FM	Dripping Springs, Texas
KLLU	88.9 FM	Gallup, New Mexico
KLLY	95.3 FM	Oildale, California
KLLZ-FM	99.1 FM	Walker, Minnesota
KLMA	96.5 FM	Hobbs, New Mexico
KLMB	99.9 FM	Klein, Montana
KLMD	101.1 FM	Talent, Oregon
KLME	95.7 FM	Langdon, North Dakota
KLMF	88.5 FM	Klamath Falls, Oregon
KLMG	97.9 FM	Esparto, California
KLMI	106.1 FM	Rock River, Wyoming
KLMJ	104.9 FM	Hampton, Iowa
KLMK	90.7 FM	Marvell, Arkansas
KLMM	94.1 FM	Oceano, California
KLMO-FM	98.9 FM	Dilley, Texas
KLMP	88.3 FM	Rapid City, South Dakota
KLMQ	90.7 FM	Placerville, Colorado
KLMR-FM	93.5	Lamar, Colorado
KLMT	89.3 FM	Billings, Montana
KLMX-FM	97.5 FM	Clayton, New Mexico
KLMY	99.7 FM	Long Beach, Washington
KLMZ	107.1 FM	Leadwood, Missouri
KLNB	88.3 FM	Grand Island, Nebraska
KLNC	105.3 FM	Lincoln, Nebraska
KLND	89.5 FM	Little Eagle, South Dakota
KLNE-FM	88.7 FM	Lexington, Nebraska
KLNI	88.7 FM	Decorah, Iowa
KLNN	103.7 FM	Questa, New Mexico
KLNO	94.1 FM	Fort Worth, Texas
KLNQ	106.5 FM	Atlanta, Louisiana
KLNR	91.7 FM	Panaca, Nevada
KLNV	106.5 FM	San Diego, California
KLNZ	103.5 FM	Glendale, Arizona
KLO-FM	103.1 FM	Coalville, Utah
KLOB	94.7 FM	Thousand Palms, California
KLOE-FM	102.5 FM	Goodland, Kansas
KLOF	88.9 FM	Gillette, Wyoming
KLOK-FM	99.5 FM	Greenfield, California
KLOL	101.1 FM	Houston, Texas
KLON	90.3 FM	Tillamook, Oregon
KLOO-FM	106.3 FM	Corvallis, Oregon
KLOP	91.5 FM	Holy Cross, Alaska
KLOQ-FM	98.7 FM	Winton, California
KLOR-FM	99.3 FM	Ponca City, Oklahoma
KLOS	95.5 FM	Los Angeles
KLOU	103.3 FM	St. Louis, Missouri
KLOV	89.3 FM	Winchester, Oregon
KLOW	98.9 FM	Reno, Texas
KLOX	90.9 FM	Creston, Iowa
KLOY	88.7 FM	Ocean Park, Washington
KLOZ	92.7 FM	Eldon, Missouri
KLPI	89.1 FM	Ruston, Louisiana
KLPR	91.1 FM	Kearney, Nebraska
KLPT	90.9 FM	Prescott, Arizona
KLPX	96.1 FM	Tucson, Arizona
KLQB	104.3 FM	Taylor, Texas
KLQP	92.1 FM	Madison, Minnesota
KLQQ	104.9 FM	Clearmont, Wyoming
KLQV	102.9 FM	San Diego, California
KLRB	89.3 FM	Stuart, Oklahoma
KLRC	90.9 FM	Tahlequah, Oklahoma
KLRD	90.1 FM	Yucaipa, California
KLRE-FM	90.5 FM	Little Rock, Arkansas
KLRF	88.5 FM	Milton-Freewater, Oregon
KLRH	92.9 FM	Reno, Nevada
KLRI	89.5 FM	Rigby, Idaho
KLRJ	94.9 FM	Aberdeen, South Dakota
KLRK-FM	88.7 FM	Yankton, South Dakota
KLRM	90.7 FM	Melbourne, Arkansas
KLRO	90.1 FM	Hot Springs, Arkansas
KLRQ	96.1 FM	Clinton, Missouri
KLRR	101.7 FM	Redmond, Oregon
KLRS	89.3 FM	Linden, California
KLRV	90.9 FM	Billings, Montana
KLRW	88.5 FM	San Angelo, Texas
KLRX	97.3 FM	Lee's Summit, Missouri
KLRY	91.3 FM	Gypsum, Colorado
KLRZ	100.3 FM	Larose, Louisiana
KLSA	90.7 FM	Alexandria, Louisiana
KLSB	97.5 FM	Goleta, California
KLSC	92.9 FM	Malden, Missouri
KLSE	90.7 FM	Rochester, Minnesota
KLSF	89.7 FM	Juneau, Alaska
KLSI	107.3 FM	Mooreland, Oklahoma
KLSK	100.3 FM	Great Falls, Montana
KLSM	104.9 FM	Tallulah, Louisiana
KLSN	106.5 FM	Dishman, Washington
KLSP	91.7 FM	Angola, Louisiana
KLSR-FM	105.3 FM	Memphis, Texas
KLSS-FM	106.1 FM	Mason City, Iowa
KLSU	91.1 FM	Baton Rouge, Louisiana
KLSW	104.5 FM	Covington, Washington
KLSY	93.7 FM	Montesano, Washington
KLTA-FM	98.7 FM	Moorhead, Minnesota
KLTB	89.7 FM	Brownfield, Texas
KLTD	101.7 FM	Temple, Texas
KLTE	107.9 FM	Kirksville, Missouri
KLTG	96.5 FM	Corpus Christi, Texas
KLTH	106.7 FM	Lake Oswego, Oregon
KLTN	102.9 FM	Houston, Texas
KLTO	99.1 FM	Moody, Texas
KLTP	90.9 FM	San Angelo, Texas
KLTQ	90.9 FM	Thatcher, Arizona
KLTR	94.1 FM	Brenham, Texas
KLTU	88.1 FM	Mammoth, Arizona
KLTW	105.3 FM	Winnie, Texas
KLTY	94.9 FM	Arlington, Texas
KLUA	93.9 FM	Kailua Kona, Hawaii
KLUB	106.9 FM	Bloomington, Texas
KLUC-FM	98.5 FM	Las Vegas, Nevada
KLUE	103.5 FM	Poplar Bluff, Missouri
KLUH	90.3 FM	Poplar Bluff, Missouri
KLUK	97.9 FM	Needles, California
KLUN	103.1 FM	Paso Robles, California
KLUR	99.9 FM	Wichita Falls, Texas
KLUU	103.5 FM	Wahiawa, Hawaii
KLUW	88.1 FM	East Wenatchee, Washington
KLUX	89.5 FM	Robstown, Texas
KLUY	88.7 FM	Searcy, Arkansas
KLVA	89.9 FM	Superior, Arizona
KLVB	103.9 FM	Lincoln, California
KLVC	88.3 FM	Magalia, California
KLVE	107.5 FM	Los Angeles
KLVF	100.7 FM	Las Vegas, New Mexico
KLVH	97.1 FM	Cleveland, Texas
KLVJ	102.1 FM	Encinitas, California
KLVK	89.1 FM	Fountain Hills, Arizona
KLVM	88.9 FM	Santa Cruz, California
KLVN	88.3 FM	Livingston, California
KLVO	97.7 FM	Belen, New Mexico
KLVP	97.9 FM	Aloha, Oregon
KLVR	91.9 FM	Middletown, California
KLVS	107.3 FM	Livermore, California
KLVU	107.1 FM	Sweet Home, Oregon
KLVV	88.7 FM	Ponca City, Oklahoma
KLVW	88.7 FM	Odessa, Texas
KLVY	91.1 FM	Fairmead, California
KLWA	101.3 FM	Westport, Washington
KLWB-FM	103.7 FM	Carencro, Louisiana
KLWC	89.1 FM	Casper, Wyoming
KLWD	91.9 FM	Gillette, Wyoming
KLWG	88.1 FM	Lompoc, California
KLWL	88.1 FM	Chillicothe, Missouri
KLWO	90.3 FM	Longview, Washington
KLWR	101.9 FM	North Rock Springs, Wyoming
KLWS	91.5 FM	Moses Lake, Washington
KLWV	90.9 FM	Chugwater, Wyoming
KLXA	89.9 FM	Alexandria, Louisiana
KLXB	105.1 FM	Bermuda Dunes, California
KLXC	90.3 FM	Carlsbad, New Mexico
KLXD	89.5 FM	Victorville, California
KLXE	93.5 FM	Calhoun, Louisiana
KLXF	90.5 FM	Modesto, California
KLXG	91.1 FM	Grants Pass, Oregon
KLXH	106.3 FM	Thibodaux, Louisiana
KLXI	99.5 FM	Fruitland, Idaho
KLXK	93.5 FM	Breckenridge, Texas
KLXN	104.1 FM	Rosepine, Louisiana
KLXP	89.7 FM	Randsburg, California
KLXQ	96.7 FM	Hot Springs, Arkansas
KLXS-FM	95.3 FM	Pierre, South Dakota
KLXV	91.9 FM	Glenwood Springs, Colorado
KLXY	90.5 FM	Woodlake, California
KLXZ	91.3 FM	Ruidoso, New Mexico
KLYD	98.9 FM	Snyder, Texas
KLYK	94.5 FM	Kelso, Washington
KLYT	88.3 FM	Albuquerque, New Mexico
KLYV	105.3 FM	Dubuque, Iowa
KLYX	89.7 FM	Pioche, Nevada
KLYY	97.5 FM	Riverside, California
KLZA	101.3 FM	Falls City, Nebraska
KLZK	107.7 FM	Idalou, Texas
KLZR	91.7 FM	Westcliffe, Colorado
KLZT	107.1 FM	Bastrop, Texas
KLZV	91.3 FM	Brush, Colorado
KLZX	95.9 FM	Weston, Idaho
KLZZ	103.7 FM	Waite Park, Minnesota

== KM-- ==
Callsign	Frequency	City of license
KMA-FM	99.1 FM	Clarinda, Iowa
KMAG	99.1 FM	Fort Smith, Arkansas
KMAJ-FM	107.7 FM	Carbondale, Kansas
KMAK	100.3 FM	Orange Cove, California
KMAQ-FM	95.1 FM	Maquoketa, Iowa
KMAR-FM	95.9 FM	Winnsboro, Louisiana
KMAT	105.1 FM	Seadrift, Texas
KMAV-FM	105.5 FM	Mayville, North Dakota
KMAX-FM	94.3 FM	Wellington, Colorado
KMBI-FM	107.9 FM	Spokane, Washington
KMBM	90.7 FM	Polson, Montana
KMBN	89.7 FM	Las Cruces, New Mexico
KMBQ-FM	99.7 FM	Wasilla, Alaska
KMBR	95.5 FM	Butte, Montana
KMBV	90.7 FM	Valentine, Nebraska
KMBZ-FM	98.1 FM	Kansas City, Kansas
KMCH	94.7 FM	Manchester, Iowa
KMCJ	99.5 FM	Colstrip, Montana
KMCK-FM	105.7 FM	Prairie Grove, Arkansas
KMCM	96.9 FM	Odessa, Texas
KMCN	94.7 FM	Clinton, Iowa
KMCO	101.3 FM	Wilburton, Oklahoma
KMCR (FM)	103.9 FM	Montgomery City, Missouri
KMCS	93.1 FM	Muscatine, Iowa
KMCU	88.7 FM	Wichita Falls, Texas
KMCV	89.9 FM	Columbia, Missouri
KMCX-FM	106.5 FM	Ogallala, Nebraska
KMDG	105.7 FM	Hays, Kansas
KMDL	97.3 FM	Kaplan, Louisiana
KMDR	95.1 FM	McKinleyville, California
KMDS	107.1 FM	Las Vegas, New Mexico
KMDX	106.1 FM	San Angelo, Texas
KMDY	90.9 FM	Keokuk, Iowa
KMDZ	96.7 FM	Las Vegas, New Mexico
KMED	106.3 FM	Eagle Point, Oregon
KMEE	92.1 FM	Thermal, California
KMEL	106.1 FM	San Francisco, California
KMEM-FM	100.5 FM	Memphis, Missouri
KMEN	100.5 FM	Mendota, California
KMEO	91.9 FM	Mertzon, Texas
KMEZ	102.9 FM	Belle Chasse, Louisiana
KMFA	89.5 FM	Austin, Texas
KMFC	92.1 FM	Centralia, Missouri
KMFX-FM	102.5 FM	Lake City, Minnesota
KMFY	96.9 FM	Grand Rapids, Minnesota
KMGA	99.5 FM	Albuquerque, New Mexico
KMGC	104.5 FM	Camden, Arkansas
KMGE	94.5 FM	Eugene, Oregon
KMGI	102.5 FM	Pocatello, Idaho
KMGJ	93.1 FM	Grand Junction, Colorado
KMGK	107.1 FM	Glenwood, Minnesota
KMGL	104.1 FM	Oklahoma City, Oklahoma
KMGM	105.5 FM	Montevideo, Minnesota
KMGN	93.9 FM	Flagstaff, Arizona
KMGO	98.7 FM	Centerville, Iowa
KMGR	99.1 FM	Nephi, Utah
KMGS	89.5 FM	Anvik, Alaska
KMGT	90.3 FM	Circle, Montana
KMGV	97.9 FM	Fresno, California
KMGW	99.3 FM	Naches, Washington
KMGX	100.7 FM	Bend, Oregon
KMGZ	95.3 FM	Lawton, Oklahoma
KMHA	91.3 FM	Four Bears, North Dakota
KMHD	89.1 FM	Gresham, Oregon
KMHK	103.7 FM	Billings, Montana
KMHS-FM	91.3 FM	Coos Bay, Oregon
KMHT-FM	103.9 FM	Marshall, Texas
KMIH	88.9 FM	Mercer Island, Washington
KMIL	105.1 FM	Cameron, Texas
KMIQ	104.9 FM	Robstown, Texas
KMIS-FM	103.9 FM	Gideon, Missouri
KMIT	105.9 FM	Mitchell, South Dakota
KMIX	100.9 FM	Tracy, California
KMJ-FM	105.9 FM	Fresno, California
KMJB	89.1 FM	Hudson, Wyoming
KMJI	93.3 FM	Ashdown, Arkansas
KMJJ-FM	99.7 FM	Shreveport, Louisiana
KMJK	107.3 FM	Lexington, Missouri
KMJQ	102.1 FM	Houston, Texas
KMJV	106.3 FM	Soledad, California
KMJX	105.1 FM	Conway, Arkansas
KMKF	101.5 FM	Manhattan, Kansas
KMKL	90.3 FM	North Branch, Minnesota
KMKO-FM	95.7 FM	Lake Crystal, Minnesota
KMKT	93.1 FM	Bells, Texas
KMKV	100.7 FM	Kihei, Hawaii
KMKX	93.5 FM	Willits, California
KMLA	103.7 FM	El Rio, California
KMLD	94.5 FM	Casper, Wyoming
KMLE	107.9 FM	Chandler, Arizona
KMLK	98.7 FM	El Dorado, Arkansas
KMLL	91.7 FM	Marysville, Kansas
KMLM-FM	107.3 FM	Grover Beach, California
KMLO	100.7 FM	Lowry, South Dakota
KMLR	106.3 FM	Gonzales, Texas
KMLS	95.5 FM	Miles, Texas
KMLT	88.3 FM	Jackson, Wyoming
KMLV	88.1 FM	Ralston, Nebraska
KMLW	88.3 FM	Moses Lake, Washington
KMLY	95.1 FM	Gonzales, California
KMMA	97.1 FM	Green Valley, Arizona
KMME	100.5 FM	Cottage Grove, Oregon
KMMG	96.7 FM	Benton City, Washington
KMMK	88.7 FM	Coggon, Iowa
KMML	92.9 FM	Cimarron, Kansas
KMMO-FM	102.9 FM	Marshall, Missouri
KMMR	100.1 FM	Malta, Montana
KMMS-FM	94.7 FM	Bozeman, Montana
KMMT	106.5 FM	Mammoth Lakes, California
KMMX	100.3 FM	Tahoka, Texas
KMMY	96.5 FM	Soper, Oklahoma
KMMZ	101.3 FM	Crane, Texas
KMNA	98.7 FM	Mabton, Washington
KMNB	102.9 FM	Minneapolis, Minnesota
KMNE-FM	90.3 FM	Bassett, Nebraska
KMNO	91.7 FM	Wailuku, Hawaii
KMNR	89.7 FM	Rolla, Missouri
KMNT	104.3 FM	Chehalis, Washington
KMOA	89.7 FM	Nuʻuuli, American Samoa
KMOC	89.5 FM	Wichita Falls, Texas
KMOD-FM	97.5 FM	Tulsa, Oklahoma
KMOE	92.1 FM	Butler, Missouri
KMOJ	89.9 FM	Minneapolis, Minnesota
KMOK	106.9 FM	Lewiston, Idaho
KMOM	105.5 FM	Roscoe, South Dakota
KMON-FM	94.5 FM	Great Falls, Montana
KMOO-FM	99.9 FM	Mineola, Texas
KMOP	91.5 FM	Garapan, Northern Marianas Islands
KMOQ	105.3 FM	Columbus, Kansas
KMOR	93.3 FM	Gering, Nebraska
KMOU	104.7 FM	Roswell, New Mexico
KMOX-FM	104.1 FM	Hazelwood, Missouri
KMOY	92.7 FM	Dededo, Guam
KMOZ-FM	92.3 FM	Grand Junction, Colorado
KMPB	90.7 FM	Breckenridge, Colorado
KMPK	96.7 FM	McPherson, Kansas
KMPN	95.9 FM	Burnet, Texas
KMPO	88.7 FM	Modesto, California
KMPQ	88.1 FM	Roseburg, Oregon
KMPR	88.9 FM	Minot, North Dakota
KMPZ	88.1 FM	Salida, Colorado
KMQA	100.5 FM	East Porterville, California
KMQX	88.5 FM	Weatherford, Texas
KMRA	91.1 FM	Monahans, Texas
KMRE	88.3 FM	Bellingham, Washington
KMRJ	99.5 FM	Rancho Mirage, California
KMRK-FM	96.1 FM	Odessa, Texas
KMRL	91.9 FM	Buras, Louisiana
KMRO	90.3 FM	Camarillo, California
KMRQ	96.7 FM	Riverbank, California
KMRR	104.9 FM	Spencer, Iowa
KMRX	96.1 FM	El Dorado, Arkansas
KMRZ-FM	106.7 FM	Superior, Wyoming
KMSA	91.3 FM	Grand Junction, Colorado
KMSC	92.9 FM	Sioux City, Iowa
KMSE	88.7 FM	Rochester, Minnesota
KMSI	88.1 FM	Moore, Oklahoma
KMSK	91.3 FM	Austin, Minnesota
KMSL	91.7 FM	Mansfield, Louisiana
KMSM-FM	103.9 FM	Butte, Montana
KMSN	104.1 FM	Mason, Texas
KMSO	102.5 FM	Missoula, Montana
KMST	88.5 FM	Rolla, Missouri
KMSU	89.7 FM	Mankato, Minnesota
KMSW	92.7 FM	The Dalles, Oregon
KMTB	99.5 FM	Murfreesboro, Arkansas
KMTC	91.1 FM	Russellville, Arkansas
KMTG	89.3 FM	San Jose, California
KMTH	98.7 FM	Maljamar, New Mexico
KMTJ	90.5 FM	Columbus, Montana
KMTK	99.7 FM	Bend, Oregon
KMTN	96.9 FM	Jackson, Wyoming
KMTS	99.1 FM	Glenwood Springs, Colorado
KMTX	105.3 FM	Helena, Montana
KMTY	97.7 FM	Gibbon, Nebraska
KMTZ	107.7 FM	Walkerville, Montana
KMUC	90.5 FM	Columbia, Missouri
KMUD	91.1 FM	Garberville, California
KMUE	88.3 FM	Eureka, California
KMUL-FM	103.1 FM	Muleshoe, Texas
KMUN	91.9 FM	Astoria, Oregon
KMUR	88.3 FM	Bullhead City, Arizona
KMUW	89.1 FM	Wichita, Kansas
KMUZ	88.5 FM	Turner, Oregon
KMVA	103.9 FM	Gilbert, Arizona
KMVC	91.7 FM	Marshall, Missouri
KMVE	106.9 FM	California City, California
KMVK	107.5 FM	Fort Worth, Texas
KMVL-FM	100.5 FM	Madisonville, Texas
KMVN	105.7 FM	Anchorage, Alaska
KMVP-FM	98.7 FM	Phoenix, Arizona
KMVQ-FM	99.7 FM	San Francisco, California
KMVR	104.9 FM	Mesilla Park, New Mexico
KMVS	89.3 FM	Moss Beach, California
KMVX	101.9 FM	Monroe, Louisiana
KMWA	96.3 FM	Edina, Minnesota
KMWB	93.1 FM	Captain Cook, Hawaii
KMWC	89.9 FM	Bethany, Missouri
KMWM	101.7 FM	Alturas, California
KMWR	90.7 FM	Brookings, Oregon
KMWS	89.7 FM	Mount Vernon, Washington
KMWV	98.3 FM	Dallas, Oregon
KMWX	92.5 FM	Abilene, Texas
KMWY	91.1 FM	Jackson, Wyoming
KMXA-FM	99.9 FM	Minot, North Dakota
KMXB	94.1 FM	Henderson, Nevada
KMXD	100.5 FM	Monroe, Utah
KMXE-FM	99.3 FM	Red Lodge, Montana
KMXF	101.9 FM	Lowell, Arkansas
KMXG	96.1 FM	Clinton, Iowa
KMXH	93.9 FM	Alexandria, Louisiana
KMXI	95.1 FM	Chico, California
KMXJ-FM	94.1 FM	Amarillo, Texas
KMXK	94.9 FM	Cold Spring, Minnesota
KMXL	95.1 FM	Carthage, Missouri
KMXM	101.7 FM	Helena Valley Northeast, Montana
KMXN	92.9 FM	Osage City, Kansas
KMXP	96.9 FM	Phoenix, Arizona
KMXQ	92.9 FM	Socorro, New Mexico
KMXR	93.9 FM	Corpus Christi, Texas
KMXS	103.1 FM	Anchorage, Alaska
KMXT	100.1 FM	Kodiak, Alaska
KMXV	93.3 FM	Kansas City, Missouri
KMXW	92.5 FM	Bar Nunn, Wyoming
KMXX	99.3 FM	Imperial, California
KMXY	104.3 FM	Grand Junction, Colorado
KMXZ-FM	94.9 FM	Tucson, Arizona
KMYI	94.1 FM	San Diego, California
KMYO	95.1 FM	Comfort, Texas
KMYT	94.5 FM	Temecula, California
KMYX-FM	92.5 FM	Arvin, California
KMYY	92.3 FM	Rayville, Louisiana
KMYZ-FM	104.5 FM	Pryor, Oklahoma
KMZA	92.1 FM	Seneca, Kansas
KMZE	92.3 FM	Woodward, Oklahoma
KMZK	106.9 FM	Clifton, Colorado
KMZL	91.1 FM	Missoula, Montana
KMZM	103.1 FM	Madison, South Dakota
KMZO	90.3 FM	Hamilton, Montana
KMZR	92.5 FM	Atwater, California
KMZU	100.7 FM	Carrollton, Missouri
KMZZ	98.3 FM	Bishop, Texas

== See also ==
- North American call sign
