= KMOZ =

KMOZ may refer to:

- KMOZ-FM, a radio station (92.3 FM) licensed to Grand Junction, Colorado, United States
- KMOZ (AM), a radio station (1590 AM) licensed to Rolla, Missouri, United States
- KKVT, a radio station (100.7 FM) licensed to Grand Junction, Colorado, United States, which held the call sign KMOZ-FM from 2001 to 2013
