= KJOL =

KJOL may refer to:

- KJOL (AM), a radio station (620 AM) licensed to serve Grand Junction, Colorado, United States
- KJOL-FM, a radio station (91.9 FM) licensed to serve Montrose, Colorado
