= KAKR =

KAKR may refer to:

- KAKR (FM), a radio station (103.7 FM) licensed to serve Akron, Colorado, United States
- Akron Executive Airport (ICAO code KAKR)
