= KLZR =

KLZR may refer to:

- KLZR (FM), a radio station (91.7 FM) licensed to serve Westcliffe, Colorado, United States
- KKSW, a radio station (105.9 FM) licensed to serve Lawrence, Kansas, United States, which held the call sign KLZR from 1989 to 2012
