= KBDL =

KBDL may refer to:

- KBDL-LP, a low-power radio station (107.9 FM) licensed to Carbondale, Colorado, United States
- the ICAO code for Bradley International Airport in Hartford County, Connecticut, United States
