= RRSR =

RRSR may refer to:

- Aftersight (formerly RRSR), an American radio reading service for blind, visually impaired, and print-handicapped people
- Rotation to revolution speed ratio in planetary ball mills
