= KVLE =

KVLE may refer to:

- KVLE-FM, a radio station (102.3 FM) licensed to Gunnison, Colorado, United States
- KVLE (AM), a defunct radio station (610 AM) formerly licensed to Vail, Colorado
