= KGUS =

KGUS may refer to:

- KGUS-LP, a low-power radio station (99.1 FM) licensed to Gunnison, Colorado, United States
- the ICAO code for Grissom Joint Air Reserve Base, in Kokomo, Indiana, United States
