= KCIC =

KCIC may refer to:

- KCIC (FM), a radio station (88.5 FM) licensed to Grand Junction, Colorado, United States
- The ICAO code for Chico Municipal Airport, an airport in Chico, California
- Kereta Cepat Indonesia China, a high-speed rail company in Indonesia
