= AINC =

AINC may refer to:

- Audio Information Network of Colorado, radio reading service
- Indigenous and Northern Affairs Canada, department of the government of Canada
