= KSTR =

KSTR may refer to:

- KSTR-DT, a television station (virtual channel 49/34 digital) licensed to Irving, Texas, United States
- KSTR-FM, a radio station (96.1 FM) licensed to Montrose, Colorado, United States
