= KBTB =

KBTB may refer to:

- KVPP, a radio station (88.9 FM) licensed to serve Pago Pago, American Samoa, which held the call sign KBTB from 2011 to 2014
- KKVM, a radio station (104.7 FM) licensed to serve Vail, Colorado, United States, which held the call sign KBTB from 2009 to 2011
