= KNAM =

Radio station in Silt, Colorado

- Silt, Colorado; United States
- Broadcast area: Silt and Parachute
- Frequency: 1490 kHz
- Branding: The Monkey

Programming
- Format: Oldies (KKVT-HD2 simulcast)

Ownership
- Owner: MBC Grand Broadcasting, Inc.
- Sister stations: KGLN, KKVT, KMGJ, KMOZ-FM, KNZZ, KSTR-FM, KTMM

History
- First air date: April 2010

Technical information
- Licensing authority: FCC
- Facility ID: 160492
- Class: C
- Power: 740 watts
- Transmitter coordinates: 39°33′37″N 107°39′5″W
- Translator: 98.7 K254CO (Silt)

Links
- Public license information: Public file; LMS
- Webcast: Listen live
- Website: The Monkey

KNAM, branded as The Monkey, is an oldies radio station in Silt that broadcasts on 1490 AM. It serves listeners in the Western Slope, along the Colorado River and Interstate 70, northwest of Aspen and the Roaring Fork Valley, and northeast of Grand Junction. It simulcasts with KKVT-HD2.

On August 20, 2020, KNAM changed their format from a simulcast of sports-formatted KTMM to simulcast of oldies-formatted KKVT-HD2 Grand Junction, branded as "The Monkey".
