= KTHN =

- La Junta, Colorado; United States
- Broadcast area: Cheraw, Colorado; Rocky Ford, Colorado
- Frequency: 92.1 MHz
- Branding: Thunder Country 92.1

Programming
- Format: Country
- Affiliations: Westwood One

Ownership
- Owner: Robin and Gary Reed; (Thunder Media, Inc.)
- Sister stations: KBLJ

History
- First air date: August 28, 1974

Technical information
- Licensing authority: FCC
- Facility ID: 7046
- Class: A
- ERP: 3,000 watts
- HAAT: 91 meters (299 ft)
- Transmitter coordinates: 37°59′15″N 103°34′2″W

Links
- Public license information: Public file; LMS
- Webcast: Listen live
- Website: lajuntaradio.com/big-country-92-

KTHN (92.1 FM, "Thunder County 92.1") is a radio station broadcasting a country music format. Licensed to La Junta, Colorado, United States, the station is currently owned by Robin Reed and Gary Reed, through licensee Thunder Media, Inc. The station airs Intelligence for Your Life featuring John Tesh in the evenings.

Former logo

On June 1, 2022, KTHN rebranded as "Thunder Country 92.1".
