= KLFV =

K-Love radio station in Grand Junction, Colorado

Coordinates: 39.066°N 108.747°W

- Grand Junction, Colorado; United States
- Frequency: 90.3 MHz
- Branding: K-Love

Programming
- Format: Contemporary Christian
- Network: K-Love

Ownership
- Owner: Educational Media Foundation

History
- First air date: December 25, 1981
- Former call signs: KJOL (1981–2000)
- Call sign meaning: "K-Love"

Technical information
- Licensing authority: FCC
- Facility ID: 12341
- Class: C2
- ERP: 3,000 watts
- HAAT: 399 meters
- Translators: K223BR (92.5 MHz, Montrose)

Links
- Public license information: Public file; LMS
- Website: klove.com

KLFV (90.3 FM) is a radio station in Grand Junction, Colorado. The station broadcasts a contemporary Christian format from the K-Love radio network; the station and network are owned by the Educational Media Foundation.

== History ==
90.3 FM began broadcasting as KJOL ("Joy of the Lord") on April 24, 1982, after missing a planned Christmas 1981 launch. It was the second religious radio station in the Grand Junction area, after KCIC, which had signed on in 1979; however, KJOL broadcast with more power than KCIC. KJOL was owned by the Columbus Evangelical Free Church and broadcast from its facilities; operations were managed by an interdenominational alliance of local churches, the Western Slope Church Ministries Association. From the start, KJOL adopted a more contemporary gospel sound than the traditionally oriented KCIC; the programmer, Stan Bruning, had come from KWBI-FM in Denver.

The mid-1980s saw a major ownership transition for the young religious station. In 1984, Columbus Evangelical sold it for $24,000 to Western Bible College, owners of KWBI-FM; the church sought to ensure KJOL's continued financial stability with the sale. After the sale closed in 1985, KJOL, which had previously been a major conservative voice and drove protests at abortion clinics and grocery stores that sold pornographic materials, toned down its rhetoric and slightly increased the proportion of music in its broadcast day. The changes and Western Bible College-developed format took hold in February, after the station was silent for a week; the former general manager who had spearheaded the protest activities exited in June.

After a couple of mergers, Western Bible College became Colorado Christian University by 1989, and later expanded its educational offerings to the Western Slope and opened a center in Grand Junction in 1991. The university sold its entire regional radio network to EMF in 2000; local operations were shuttered that October in favor of rebroadcasting EMF's K-Love programming as KLFV, and the religious talk and teaching programming disappeared altogether. Former KJOL station manager Ken Andrews began efforts to bring a new local Christian station to Grand Junction; those efforts succeeded when he reached an agreement to broker out 620 AM and relaunch it as the new KJOL effective July 1, 2001.
