= KGLN =

- Glenwood Springs, Colorado; United States
- Frequency: 980 kHz
- Branding: KGLN 980 AM

Programming
- Format: Talk radio

Ownership
- Owner: MBC Grand Broadcasting, Inc.
- Sister stations: KKVT; KMGJ; KMOZ-FM; KNAM; KNZZ; KSTR-FM; KTMM

History
- First air date: 1950
- Call sign meaning: Glenwood

Technical information
- Licensing authority: FCC
- Facility ID: 12373
- Class: B
- Power: 2,000 watts (day); 225 watts (night)
- Transmitter coordinates: 39°33′9.9″N 107°19′50.2″W
- Translator: 101.3 K267CH (Glenwood Springs)

Links
- Public license information: Public file; LMS
- Webcast: Listen live
- Website: kgln.com

KGLN (980 AM) is a radio station broadcasting a talk format. Licensed to Glenwood Springs, Colorado, United States, the station is owned by MBC Grand Broadcasting, Inc.

On November 27, 2007, Colorado West Broadcasting, Inc. sold KGLN to current owner MBC Grand Broadcasting, Inc. for $250,000.
