= KCME =

Radio station in Manitou Springs, Colorado

Coordinates: 38.744°N 104.862°W

- Colorado Springs, Colorado; United States
- Broadcast area: Colorado Springs, Colorado; Manitou Springs, Colorado (88.7 MHz); Cripple Creek, Colorado; Victor, Colorado (89.5 MHz); Salida, Colorado; Buena Vista, Colorado (88.1 MHz & 89.5 MHz); Cañon City, Colorado; Penrose, Colorado; Florence, Colorado (91.1 MHz); Summit County, Colorado (89.3 MHz)
- Frequency: 88.7 MHz (HD Radio)
- Branding: Analog FM/HD1: Local, Classical, Cultural; HD2: In The Moment - Jazz 93.5

Programming
- Format: Classical music
- Subchannels: HD2: Jazz 93.5 (Jazz)

Ownership
- Owner: Cheyenne Mountain Public Broadcast House, Inc.

History
- First air date: December 24, 1979 (at 88.1)
- Former frequencies: 88.1 MHz (1979–1990)
- Call sign meaning: Charles M. Edmunds was one of the founders of KCME; marketed as Keeping Classical Music Everywhere

Technical information
- Facility ID: 10791
- Class: C1
- ERP: 8,900 watts (12,000 watts with beam tilt)
- HAAT: 668 meters (2,192 ft)
- Translator: HD2: 93.5 K228EM (Colorado Springs)

Links
- Webcast: Analog FM/HD1: Listen Live; HD2: Jazz935 Listen Live
- Website: Analog FM/HD1: kcme.org HD2: jazz935.org

KCME (88.7 MHz) is an independent, listener-supported public radio station in Colorado Springs, Colorado, serving the Colorado Springs - Pueblo radio market. It is owned by Cheyenne Mountain Public Broadcast House, Inc., and airs a classical music radio format. Its slogan is "Local. Classical. Cultural". KCME's studios and administrative offices are at 1921 N. Weber Street in Colorado Springs. Its main broadcasting tower is on Cheyenne Mountain. KCME may be heard worldwide via internet streaming on www.kcme.org. KCME also broadcasts in the HD Radio digital format.

== Jazz 93.5 ==
KCME programs a wide variety of jazz on its HD-2 subchannel, which also feeds a translator station, 93.5 MHz K228EM. It is branded as Jazz 93.5, and is a sister station of KCME. Originally KCME aired jazz on Saturday mornings and Saturday evenings during the first 26 years it was on the air. In the 1990s, KCME also had Jazz during the overnight hours in the summer months.

KCME dropped jazz programming in 2007 to focus on its main classical music programming due in part to Colorado Public Radio's classical service having a translator in Colorado Springs which was eventually closed down. In addition, both CPR Classical and KCME broadcast the Metropolitan Opera on Saturdays, previously sandwiched for many years between the jazz blocks on KCME. When HD technology made it possible, KCME created a full-time jazz service on its HD-2 subchannel in late October 2017, coupled with a translator station. Jazz 93.5 is also heard worldwide via internet streaming on www.jazz935.org. Its slogan is "In the Moment".

== History ==
KCME signed on for the first time on December 24, 1979, on its original frequency of 88.1 MHz. It was founded by Charles M. Edmonds, who also served as the president and chief engineer. The station's call sign is made up of Edmonds' initials, C.M.E. KCME's offices and studios were on Minnehaha Avenue in Manitou Springs.

In 1990, KCME moved to its current dial position at 88.7 MHz. Another station replaced KCME at 88.1, KTPL, a Christian radio outlet in nearby Pueblo, Colorado. In the mid 1990s, KCME's studios and offices moved to facilities in Colorado Springs, although the station is still identified on the air as "KCME, Manitou Springs."

== Satellite stations ==
KCME maintains several satellite stations for its classical programming: Full powered KMPZ 88.1 MHz in Salida (200 watts), along with translators K208DP 89.5 MHz in Nathrop (100 watts) and K216EF 91.1 FM Florence (100 watts) and 89.5 in Cripple Creek, Colorado. In July 2008, KCME was invited by Summit Public Radio and TV, Inc. to relay its signal to Summit County (Breckenridge, Dillon, Frisco and Silverthorne) on 89.3 MHz.
