= KBLJ =

Radio station in La Junta, Colorado

- La Junta, Colorado; United States
- Frequency: 1400 kHz
- Branding: Lightning 1400

Programming
- Format: Classic hits

Ownership
- Owner: Robin Reed and Gary Reed; (Thunder Media, Inc.)
- Sister stations: KTHN

History
- First air date: July 23, 1937 (as KOKO at 1370)
- Former call signs: KOKO (1937–1952); KBNZ (1952–1960); KBZZ (1960–1999)
- Former frequencies: 1370 kHz (1937–1941)

Technical information
- Licensing authority: FCC
- Facility ID: 7047
- Class: C
- Power: 1,000 watts unlimited
- Transmitter coordinates: 37°59′14″N 103°34′1″W
- Translator: 104.3 K282BX (La Junta)

Links
- Public license information: Public file; LMS
- Webcast: Listen Live
- Website: KBLJ Online

KBLJ (1400 AM) is a radio station licensed to La Junta, Colorado, United States. The station is owned by Robin and Gary Reed, through licensee Thunder Media, Inc.

== History ==
It first aired on 1370 kHz as KOKO in 1937. It moved to 1400 kHz in 1941 as a result of the NARBA agreement.

On June 1, 2022, KBLJ changed its format from news/talk to classic hits, branded as "Lightning 1400".
