= KJYE =

- Delta, Colorado; United States
- Frequency: 1400 kHz

Programming
- Format: Religious

Ownership
- Owner: United Ministries
- Sister stations: KJOL

History
- First air date: January 14, 1955
- Former call signs: KDTA (1955-1986); KPLG (1986–1988); KDTA (1988–2012)

Technical information
- Licensing authority: FCC
- Facility ID: 6606
- Class: C
- Power: 1,000 watts unlimited
- Transmitter coordinates: 38°45′38″N 108°5′28″W
- Translators: K233DF (94.5 MHz, Delta)

Links
- Public license information: Public file; LMS
- Website: http://www.kjol.org/

KJYE (1400 AM) is a radio station broadcasting a Religious format. Licensed to Delta, Colorado, United States, KJYE relays the programming of KJOL and is currently owned by United Ministries.

== History ==
The station was assigned the call letters KPLG on March 1, 1986. On January 15, 1988, the station changed its call sign to KDTA. On September 21, 2012, the station changed its call sign to the current KJYE.
