= KRKQ =

Radio station in Mountain Village, Colorado, United States

Coordinates: 37.991°N 107.973°W

- Mountain Village, Colorado; United States
- Broadcast area: San Miguel Valley
- Frequency: 95.5 MHz
- Branding: Mountain Chill

Programming
- Format: Chill

Ownership
- Owner: Brown Mountain Broadcasting LLC

History
- First air date: 2011

Technical information
- Facility ID: 166042
- Class: A
- ERP: 250 watts
- HAAT: 448 meters

Links
- Webcast: Listen Live
- Website: mountainchill.com

KRKQ (95.5 FM) is a privately owned commercial radio station licensed to Mountain Village, Colorado and serving the Telluride, Colorado area. The station is branded as "Mountain Chill." It broadcasts an eclectic music format focusing on current independent music from around the world and a relaxed "chilled-out" vibe. KRKQ's studios are located in Ouray.

Genres featured include Chill-out music, downtempo, dub, reggae, Latin, and electronica music. Ambient music is also featured late at night. KRKQ is the only broadcast radio station in the United States to play electronica and chill-out music full-time, and the second after KLBU/Santa Fe, New Mexico, who broadcast the format from 2003 to 2013.

Artists played on Mountain Chill include Thievery Corporation, ODESZA, Tosca (band), Bonobo (musician), Pretty Lights, Parov Stelar, and Bebel Gilberto.

== History ==
Mountain Chill began as an Internet-only station almost a decade before the FM signal went on the air in October 2011.
