= KVNF =

KVNF and KVMT

KVNF: Paonia, Colorado; KVMT: Montrose, Colorado; United States
- Frequencies: KVNF: 90.9 MHz; KVMT: 89.1 MHz

Programming
- Format: Public radio
- Affiliations: National Public Radio, Pacifica Radio Network

Ownership
- Owner: North Fork Valley Public Radio, Inc.

Technical information
- Licensing authority: FCC
- Facility ID: KVNF: 49221; KVMT: 85576
- Class: KVNF: A; KVMT: C1
- ERP: KVNF: 2,600 watts; KVMT: 8,000 watts
- HAAT: KVNF: -22 meters; KVMT: 482 meters
- Transmitter coordinates: KVNF: 38°52′28″N 107°39′40″W; KVMT: 38°18′52″N 108°12′2″W

Links
- Public license information: KVNF: Public file; LMS; KVMT: Public file; LMS
- Webcast: Listen Live
- Website: KVNF website

KVNF (90.9 FM), is a National Public Radio-affiliated community radio station in Paonia, Colorado. It features locally hosted music programming, independently produced public radio programs, local news and interviews, as well as National Public Radio programming. KVNF serves Western Colorado via two stations with full-power licenses (KVNF 90.9 FM and KVMT 89.1 FM) and four translators. All transmitters carry the same programming and are needed to cover KVNF's large and mountainous listening area.

As of early 2025, KVNF received 20% of its funding from the federal government via the Corporation for Public Broadcasting.

Broadcast translators for KVNF and KVMT
Call sign	Frequency	City of license	FID	ERP (W)	HAAT	Transmitter coordinates	FCC info
K204BR	88.7 FM	Lake City, Colorado	49226	51	238 m (781 ft)	37°59′40.9″N 107°19′17.2″W	LMS
K211BH	90.1 FM	Ouray, Colorado	49224	52	−764 m (−2,507 ft)	38°0′56.9″N 107°40′1.2″W	LMS
K205BA	88.9 FM	Ridgway, Colorado	49225	16	31 m (102 ft)	38°11′10.9″N 107°46′32.2″W	LMS
K256AD	99.1 FM	Palisade, Colorado	49229	10	891.5 m (2,925 ft)	39°3′13.9″N 108°15′15.2″W	LMS

== See also ==
- List of community radio stations in the United States
