= KMPB =

- Breckenridge, Colorado; United States
- Frequency: 90.7 MHz

Programming
- Format: Public radio news, talk and music
- Affiliations: National Public Radio

Ownership
- Owner: Community Radio for Northern Colorado

History
- Former call signs: KRKM (2008–2010)
- Former frequencies: 88.7 MHz (2008–2013)

Technical information
- Licensing authority: FCC
- Facility ID: 176149
- Class: A
- ERP: 600 watts
- HAAT: −76 meters (−249 ft)
- Transmitter coordinates: 39°29′44″N 106°1′44″W
- Repeaters: K201IL (88.1 MHz, Breckenridge)

Links
- Public license information: Public file; LMS
- Webcast: Listen Live
- Website: KMPB website

KMPB (90.7 FM, is a radio station broadcasting a public radio news, talk and music format. Licensed to Breckenridge, Colorado, United States, the station is currently owned by Community Radio for Northern Colorado.

== History ==
The station was assigned the call letters KRKM on April 2, 2008. Its call sign changed to KMPB on February 1, 2010.
