= KKCH =

Coordinates: 39.419°N 107.369°W

- Glenwood Springs, Colorado; United States
- Broadcast area: Aspen, Colorado
- Frequency: 92.7 MHz
- Branding: The Lift FM

Programming
- Format: Hot AC

Ownership
- Owner: Patricia MacDonald Garber and Peter Benedetti; (AlwaysMountainTime, LLC)
- Sister stations: KIFT

History
- First air date: 1997

Technical information
- Licensing authority: FCC
- Facility ID: 4360
- Class: C
- ERP: 55,200 watts
- HAAT: 763 meters (2,503 ft)
- Translator: 94.1 K231AP (Eagle)

Links
- Public license information: Public file; LMS
- Webcast: Listen Live
- Website: theliftfm.com

KKCH (92.7 FM) is a radio station broadcasting a Hot AC format. Licensed to Glenwood Springs, Colorado, United States, it serves the Aspen area. The station is currently owned by Patricia MacDonald Garber and Peter Benedetti, through licensee AlwaysMountainTime, LLC.

The radio station is rebroadcast on 94.1 MHz in Eagle, Colorado and 95.3 MHz in Aspen, Colorado and Vail, Colorado.
