= KTMM =

- Grand Junction, Colorado; United States
- Frequency: 1340 kHz
- Branding: The Team

Programming
- Format: Sports
- Affiliations: Fox Sports Radio; Infinity Sports Network; Colorado Avalanche; Colorado Rockies; Denver Broncos; Denver Nuggets; Westwood One

Ownership
- Owner: MBC Grand Broadcasting, Inc.
- Sister stations: KGLN, KKVT, KMGJ, KMOZ-FM, KNAM, KNZZ, KSTR-FM

History
- First air date: 1959
- Call sign meaning: "Team"

Technical information
- Licensing authority: FCC
- Facility ID: 47151
- Class: C
- Power: 1,000 watts
- Transmitter coordinates: 39°7′35″N 108°38′12″W
- Translators: 101.1 K266CE (Grand Junction); 102.1 K271AE (Grand Junction)

Links
- Public license information: Public file; LMS
- Webcast: Listen live
- Website: theteam1340.com

KTMM (1340 AM) is a radio station broadcasting an all sports format. Licensed to serve Grand Junction, Colorado, United States, it serves the Grand Junction area. The station is currently owned by MBC Grand Broadcasting, Inc.

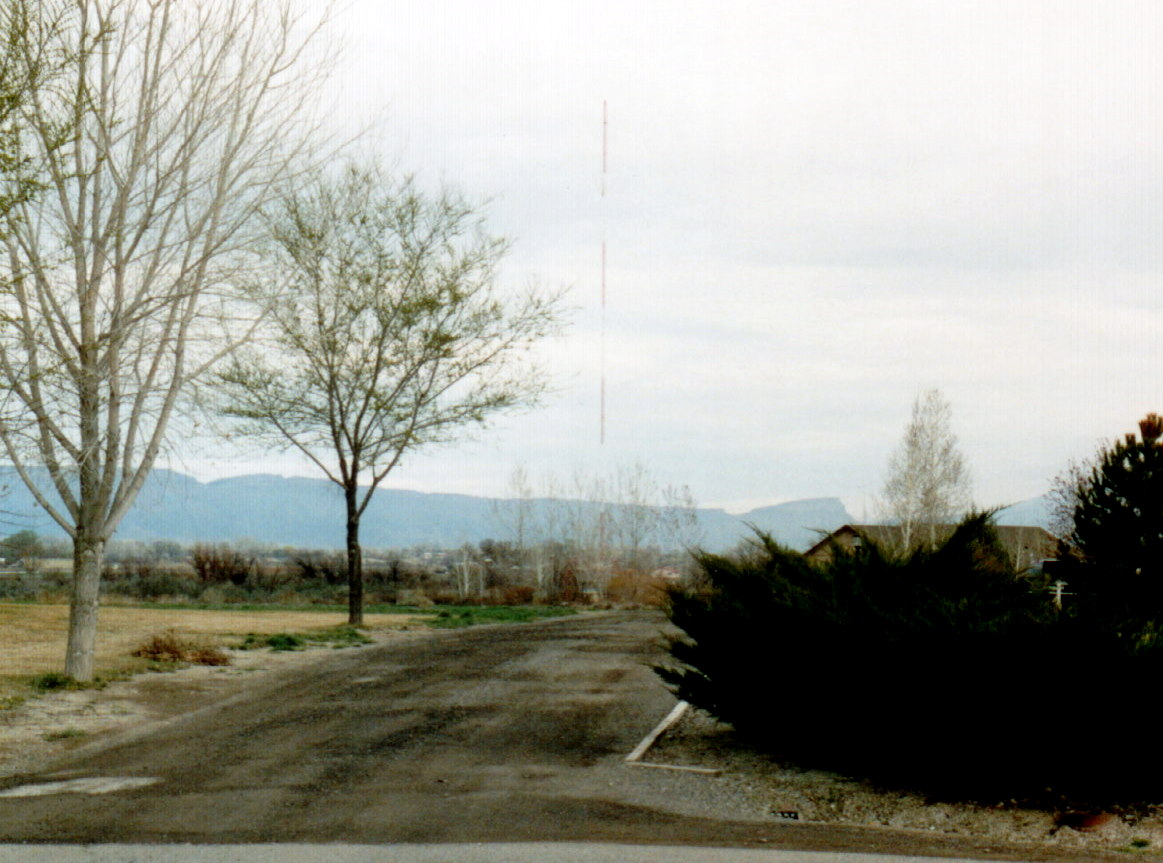
The radio tower for KTMM, shared with KJOL.

Previous logo
