= KVLE (AM) =

Radio station in Vail, Colorado, United States (1982–2014)

Vail, Colorado; United States
- Frequency: 610 kHz

Programming
- Format: Defunct (formerly news talk)
- Affiliations: Radio Colorado Network

Ownership
- Owner: Pilgrim Communications, Inc.

History
- First air date: October 25, 1982
- Last air date: November 21, 2014
- Former call signs: KRVV (1982–1988); KSPN (1988–1990); KSKE (1990–2004)

Technical information
- Facility ID: 16272
- Class: D
- Power: 5,000 watts day; 217 watts night
- Transmitter coordinates: 39°34′47.00″N 106°24′54.00″W

KVLE (610 AM) was a radio station licensed to Vail, Colorado, United States. The station was owned by Pilgrim Communications, Inc.

== History ==
The station was assigned the call letters KRVV on October 25, 1982. On February 6, 1988, the station changed its call sign to KSPN, on January 29, 1990, to KSKE, and on September 9, 2004, to KVLE.

On November 21, 2014, the FCC dismissed the station's renewal of license application and cancelled the license, deleting it from their records, after the station failed to respond to a silent request.
