= KMTS =

- Glenwood Springs, Colorado; United States
- Frequency: 99.1 MHz
- Branding: The Best Country 99.1

Programming
- Format: Country
- Affiliations: ABC News Radio, Westwood One

Ownership
- Owner: Colorado West Broadcasting

Technical information
- Licensing authority: FCC
- Facility ID: 12378
- Class: C3
- ERP: 10,000 watts
- HAAT: −69.0 meters (−226.4 ft)
- Transmitter coordinates: 39°31′57″N 107°20′30″W

Links
- Public license information: Public file; LMS
- Webcast: Listen live
- Website: Official website

KMTS (99.1 FM) is a radio station broadcasting a Country format. Licensed to Glenwood Springs, Colorado, United States, the station is currently owned by Colorado West Broadcasting and features programming from ABC News Radio and Westwood One.
