= KNZZ =

Radio station in Grand Junction, Colorado

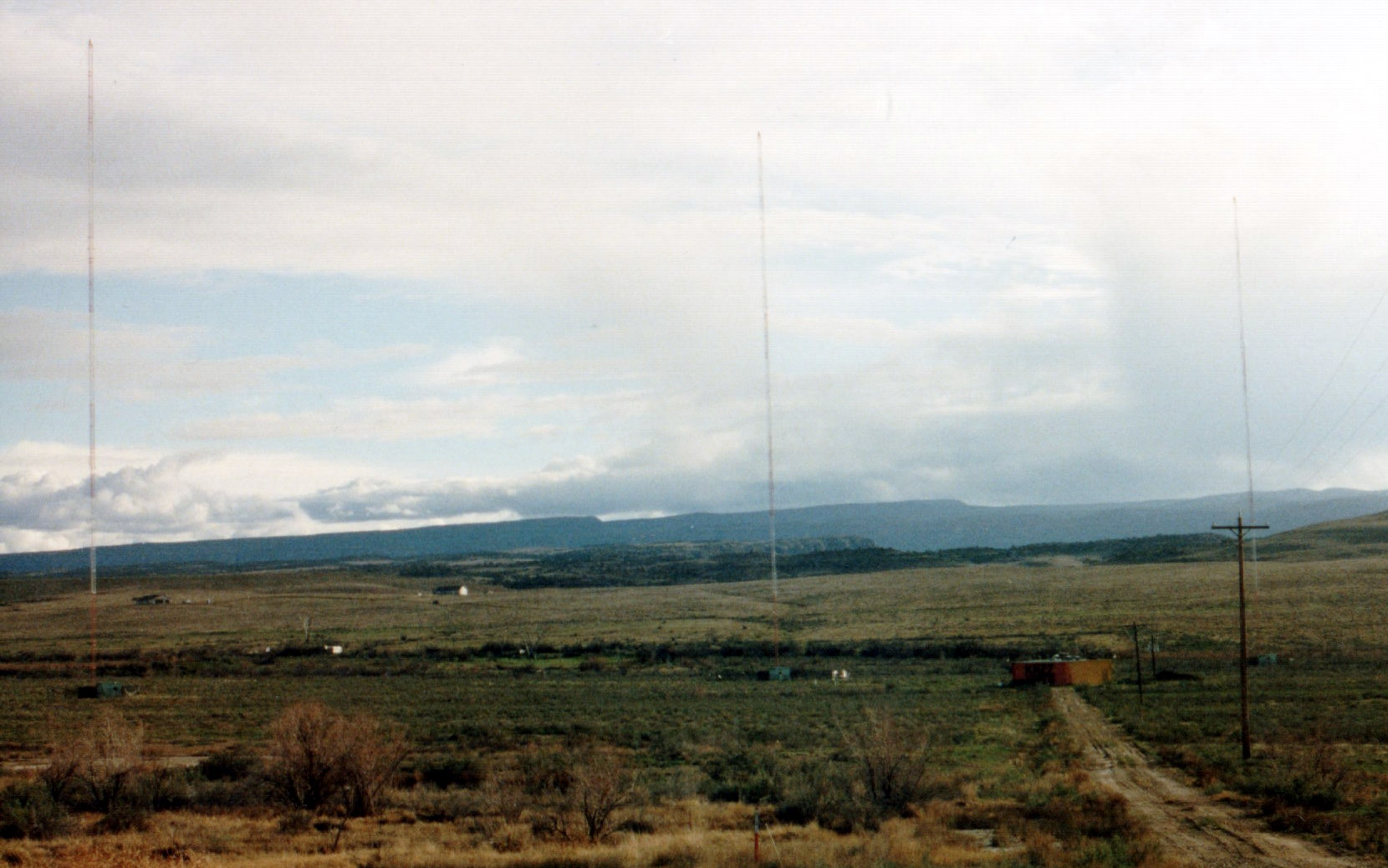
- KNZZ's broadcast towers outside of Grand Junction
- Grand Junction, Colorado; United States
- Broadcast area: Grand Junction; Aspen
- Frequency: 1100 kHz
- Branding: Newsradio 1100

Programming
- Format: News–talk
- Affiliations: Fox News Radio; Compass Media Networks; Premiere Networks; Salem Radio Network; Westwood One

Ownership
- Owner: MBC Grand Broadcasting, Inc.
- Sister stations: KGLN; KKVT; KMGJ; KMOZ-FM; KNAM; KSTR-FM; KTMM

History
- First air date: May 1, 1926 (in Edgewater, moved to Grand Junction on January 31, 1931)
- Former call signs: KFXJ (1925–1956); KREX (1956–1984); KVEE (1984–1989); KJYE (1989–1990)

Technical information
- Licensing authority: FCC
- Facility ID: 39465
- Class: B
- Power: 50,000 watts day; 36,000 watts critical hours; 10,000 watts night
- Transmitter coordinates: 38°57′5.9″N 108°25′12.3″W
- Translator: 92.7 K224FE (Grand Junction)

Links
- Public license information: Public file; LMS
- Webcast: Listen live
- Website: www.1100knzz.com

KNZZ (1100 AM) is a radio station licensed to Grand Junction, Colorado, and serves the Grand Junction area. The station is owned by MBC Grand Broadcasting, Inc. It is an affiliate of the BYU Cougars Sports Network.

== History ==
KNZZ was first licensed on September 16, 1925, as a portable broadcasting station, with the sequentially assigned call letters of KFXJ, to Mountain States Radio Distributors, Inc. in Denver. However, Mountain States' 26-year-old president, Elden F. Horn, was electrocuted the next month while working on the installation of radio station KFBU at St. Matthew's cathedral in Laramie, Wyoming, for the University of Wyoming. In 1926, as part of the settlement of Horn's estate, KFXJ's license and equipment were transferred to R. G. "Rex" Howell, a recent high school graduate from Denver and early employee of one of that city's first radio stations, KFEL.

Howell ran the station himself—including the advertising. He originally intended to base the station in Denver. However, under the regulations of the day, since the equipment had been licensed for portable use, KFXJ could not operate in any city with a fully licensed radio station. To solve the problem, Howell built his studios at a house in Edgewater, just two blocks from the Denver city limits. KFXJ first broadcast from Edgewater on May 1, 1926, and this has traditionally been recognized as the station's founding date. For all intents and purposes, though, it was a Denver station, and quickly established itself as one of the city's leading stations. In September 1926, Howell had the station's status changed from "portable" to a permanent location of "Edgewater (near)".

KFXJ developed such a strong reputation that it was widely expected to become the Denver affiliate for CBS Radio Network. When it lost out to KLZ, Howell decided to move the station to Grand Junction, which did not have any radio stations at the time. KFXJ signed on from Grand Junction on January 31, 1931, from an Art Deco and block glass building on Hillcrest Manor.

Howell added a television station in 1954, KFXJ-TV. However, searching for a more distinctive call sign, in 1956 he changed the call letters to KREX and KREX-TV—after his first name. He added KREX-FM in 1960. He sold the stations to a Cincinnati group in 1966, but reclaimed control after several missed payments in 1969. Howell died in 1978, and his estate broke up his empire in 1984, earning a handsome return on Howell's original investment of 58 years prior. The television station still has the KREX-TV calls, and continued to operate out of the building Howell originally built for the radio station until it burned down in 2008.

The AM station changed its calls to KVEE after the sale. On November 15, 1989 the station changed its call sign to KJYE, and on April 30, 1990 to KNZZ.
