= KGJX =

Radio station in Fruita–Grand Junction, Colorado

- Fruita, Colorado; United States
- Broadcast area: Grand Junction, Colorado
- Frequency: 101.5 MHz (HD Radio)
- Branding: Junction 101.5

Programming
- Format: Classic hits
- Subchannels: HD2: Regional Mexican; HD3: Rhythmic hot AC; HD4: Classic country

Ownership
- Owner: Grand Junction Media, Inc.

History
- First air date: September 1, 2012

Technical information
- Licensing authority: FCC
- Facility ID: 190448
- Class: C2
- ERP: 3,020 watts
- HAAT: 418 meters (1,371 ft)
- Transmitter coordinates: 39°4′0″N 108°44′45″W
- Translators: HD2: 104.7 K284AP (Grand Junction); HD3: 94.3 K232FB (Grand Junction); HD4: 107.3 K297BR (Grand Junction)

Links
- Public license information: Public file; LMS
- Webcast: Listen live; Listen live (HD2); Listen live (HD3); Listen live (HD4)
- Website: junction1015.com; 1047lajefa.com] (HD2); thebeat943.com (HD3); 1073theoutlaw.com (HD4)

KGJX (101.5 FM) is a radio station licensed to Fruita, Colorado. The station broadcasts a classic hits format in HD Digital Stereo and is owned by Grand Junction Media, Inc.

Former logo as Redrock 101.5.

In April 2019, the station rebranded as "101.5 The Junkyard", and switched from syndicated to local programming.

On July 7, 2022, KGJX rebranded as "Junction 101.5" with an 80s/90s-based classic hits format.
