= KAFM =

Radio station in Grand Junction, Colorado

- Grand Junction, Colorado; United States
- Frequency: 88.1 MHz

Programming
- Format: Variety

Ownership
- Owner: Grand Valley Public Radio Co, Inc

Technical information
- Licensing authority: FCC
- Facility ID: 24780
- Class: A
- ERP: 300 watts
- HAAT: 396.6 meters (1,301 ft)
- Transmitter coordinates: 39°4′0″N 108°44′41″W
- Translators: 96.9 K245BU (Palisade; 102.9 K275CC (Grand Junction)

Links
- Public license information: Public file; LMS
- Webcast: Listen Live
- Website: kafmradio.org

KAFM (88.1 FM) is a volunteer-oriented community radio station located in Grand Junction, Colorado, United States. As with most public stations, a significant share of the station's revenues are derived from member support.

== History ==
Grand Valley Public Radio Company (GVPRC) incorporated on June 22, 1992. The first board of directors included Mickey Krakowski, Martin Krakowski, Marilyn Jones, Greg Jouflas, Char Shoffner, Elizabeth Thompson and Peter Trosclair. On April 12, 1994, the FCC granted a license to GVPRC for 88.1 at 16 watts and assigned call letters KAFM.

In mid-1995, KAFM filed an application with the FCC to transmit at 46,000 watts at 100.7, asking the FCC to allow KAFM to swap frequencies in accordance with FCC rules. In January 1996, the FCC denied KAFM's request but decided to open up 100.7 for operation. The next year, KAFM and 12 other broadcast entities, including Colorado Public Radio (CPR) and almost every Grand Junction commercial broadcaster, applied for 100.7, leading the FCC to freeze the process while it determined how to proceed.

In 1997, KAFM negotiated with KCIC, 88.5, to move to 88.7, thereby allowing both stations to raise power levels but in 1998, the existence of the CPR station in Montrose, KPRH, precluded the deal with KCIC, and KAFM was stuck at 16 watts. In mid-1998, the FCC told all 100.7 applicants to decide who would get the new frequency or it would auction off the frequency to the highest bidder and put the funds into the FCC budget. In a unique situation, all 100.7 applicants agreed to hold a private auction and split the funds among the losing bidders, with bidding to increase in $5,000 increments. The auction resulted in a price tag of $440,000 for the 100.7 license. KAFM received 1/11th of the proceeds after expenses, amounting to approximately $40,000.

In mid-1998, the KAFM board decided to put 88.1 on the air at 16 watts, not knowing how many listeners would be able to receive the station or support it. Transmitter facilities were constructed on Black Ridge in 1998, and the original studio facilities on West Independent were constructed in 1999. KAFM went on the air March 5, 1999.

In November 2001, KAFM moved to 1310 Ute Avenue, purchasing its current building after their landlord decided to triple the rent for its original studios. In 2004. KAFM received funding to build Studio D, a volunteer-run recording and sound studio for the Radio Room, an 80-person concert hall in their new building. KAFM began monthly Radio Room concerts, highlighting local musicians and national acts.

== See also ==
- List of community radio stations in the United States
- Campus radio
- List of college radio stations in the United States
