= KMSA =

Radio station at Colorado Mesa University in Grand Junction, Colorado

Coordinates: 39.0655°N 108.7484°W

- Grand Junction, Colorado; United States
- Frequency: 91.3 MHz
- Branding: KMSA 91.3 FM

Programming
- Format: Adult album alternative

Ownership
- Owner: Colorado Mesa University

History
- First air date: February 20, 1975
- Call sign meaning: "Mesa"

Technical information
- Licensing authority: FCC
- Facility ID: 41300
- Class: C2
- ERP: 3,100 watts
- HAAT: 406.8 meters (1,335 ft)

Links
- Public license information: Public file; LMS
- Website: KMSA website

KMSA (91.3 FM) "Music for the Mavs" is a college radio station at Colorado Mesa University in Grand Junction, Colorado.

== History ==
KMSA began broadcasting February 20, 1975, from the campus of then-Mesa College, operating from space that formerly was unused rooms, a closet and a restroom. Its first year was rather turbulent, marked by the need to replace borrowed equipment (including a transmitter from the University of Northern Colorado) in the first year of operation and a citation from the Federal Communications Commission for having an unlicensed disc jockey; at one time, a student announced a dormitory party in progress, which proceeded to swell from 15 to 200 attendees.

Further turmoil came when the station's 18 volunteers were forced out in 1977, in favor of having all programming be hosted by Mesa College students. The policy, set by college president John Tomlinson, could have forced KMSA to cease operations. That same year, however, the station replaced its tower, improving signal quality even though the station still broadcast with 10 watts. Two years later, its Houston Hall facilities were remodeled and relocated to the first floor; while it was initially planned for the station to go off throughout the summer of 1979, it did not return to the air until February 1980. While KMSA was successful at getting employees and student managers jobs in Colorado media outlets—four of its five station managers had gone on to leadership positions at Western Slope broadcast stations, and one former station staffer started KVNF in Paonia—past and present staff felt that the lack of non-students hurt the station's quality. KMSA also ran on a small budget, and the college did not offer any courses in radio.

1981 brought a power increase to 500 watts. It also brought changes in who was eligible to work at the station, namely a more stringent credit hour requirement, and an increased integration with the college, which threatened to push out some personalities at KMSA. However, only three DJs ended up being forced out. Two years later, in 1983, KMSA carried its first live sports coverage, of Mesa College baseball. In 1985, it began seeking more underwriters and professionalized its format.

In 2007, a group of students, backed by energy rebates and contributions from the school and local business groups, installed solar panels to power KMSA's operations. By this time, KMSA was known especially for its specialty programming of metal music, particularly on weekends. KMSA upgraded in 2012 to 4,300 watts from a new transmitter atop Black Ridge, bringing its signal to the entire Grand Valley; that same year, it also raffled off 12 credit hours of Colorado Mesa University tuition.

After longtime faculty advisor Regis Tucci unexpectedly died in 2015, Jim Davis took the reins and sought to restore balance to a station that, according to some record store customers, was playing too much metal. Additionally, KMSA's automation equipment was upgraded.

== See also ==
- Campus radio
- List of college radio stations in the United States
