= KTLF =

- Colorado Springs, Colorado; United States
- Frequency: 90.5 MHz
- Branding: The Light; KTLF Radio Network

Programming
- Format: Contemporary worship music

Ownership
- Owner: Educational Communications Of Colorado Springs, Inc.
- Sister stations: KTPL

History
- Call sign meaning: Keeping The Lord First

Technical information
- Licensing authority: FCC
- Facility ID: 18796
- Class: C0
- ERP: 20,000 Watts
- HAAT: 673 meters
- Transmitter coordinates: 38.745°N 104.861°W

Links
- Public license information: Public file; LMS
- Webcast: Listen Live
- Website: ktlf.radio

KTLF (90.5 FM, "The Light") is a radio station in Colorado Springs, Colorado, United States, airing a contemporary worship music format. Owned by Educational Communications of Colorado Springs (ECCS), KTLF has studios and offices on Kelly Johnson Boulevard in Colorado Springs.

ECCS operates the KTLF Radio Network, a series of four Christian formats and associated transmitters through Colorado.

== History ==
KTLF first signed on the air February 27, 1989 at 89.7 MHz, originally broadcasting an Inspirational/Soft Christian Music/Praise & Worship format. In 1991, KTLF later swapped frequencies with the Pikes Peak Community College station, KEPC, and boosted its power.

During the Christmas season KTLF plays Christmas music that is focused on Christ-centered songs and carols.

== Formats ==
The KTLF Radio Network consists of four formats, all of which are fed from KTLF or its full-service satellites:

- The Light, contemporary worship music
- The Legacy, traditional Christian music and hymns
- Reflections, instrumental worship music
- KTLF Life Talk, airing Moody Radio Network programming

== Network ==
In addition to the main station, KTLF is carried on an additional 13 stations and 31 translators to widen its broadcast area.

KTLF Radio Network
Call sign	Frequency	City of license	Facility ID	Class	ERP (W)	Height (m (ft))	Service
KBEI	90.5	Brush	173749	A	1,000	56 m (184 ft)	
KTLC	89.1	Canon City	88201	C3	1,150	450 m (1,480 ft)	The Light
KTCF	89.5	Dolores	94188	A	500	53 m (174 ft)	The Light
KTOL	90.9	Leadville	94202	A	450	−207 m (−679 ft)	The Light
KTMH	89.9	Montrose	89574	C1	4,000	498 m (1,634 ft)	The Light
KTPS	89.7	Pagosa Springs	94189	A	380	381 m (1,250 ft)	The Light
KTPL	88.3	Pueblo	12362	C1	65,000	69 m (226 ft)	The Legacy
KTPF	91.3	Salida	94198	C2	390	900 m (3,000 ft)	The Light
KTSG	91.7	Steamboat Springs	88717	C3	2,500	186 m (610 ft)	The Light
KTAD	89.9	Sterling	91471	C3	5,000	124 m (407 ft)	The Legacy
KTML	91.9	South Fork	173903	C3	500	492 m (1,614 ft)	The Light
KTDL	90.7	Trinidad	93645	A	450	296 m (971 ft)	The Light
KTAW	89.3	Walsenburg	89073	A	500	115 m (377 ft)	The Light

=== Translators ===
Call sign	Frequency	City of license	FID	ERP (W)	Class	FCC info	Notes
K274CU	102.7 FM	Alamosa, Colorado	145938	4	D	LMS	The Light
K208DQ	89.5 FM	Almont, Colorado	92526	16	D	LMS	The Light
K208CH	89.5 FM	Burlington, Colorado	78197	250	D	LMS	The Light
K210BG	90.1 FM	Canon City, Colorado	18762	250	D	LMS	The Light
K216ES	91.1 FM	Cardiff, Colorado	88582	14	D	LMS	The Light
K234AJ	94.7 FM	Colorado Springs, Colorado	139095	84	D	LMS	Reflections
K290AK	105.9 FM	Colorado Springs, Colorado	139094	55	D	LMS	Reflections
K292FM	106.3 FM	Denver, Colorado	138285	99	D	LMS	The Light, via KQMT HD3
K237CY	95.3 FM	Fort Collins, Colorado	140267	10	D	LMS	Assignment pending January 2026 to Cedar Cove Broadcasting in exchange for K214FJ Golden. To relay KRKU (767299) Hillsdale, Wyoming.
K217FS	91.3 FM	Frisco, Colorado	18845	23	D	LMS	The Light
K229AH	93.7 FM	Grand Junction, Colorado	138496	10	D	LMS	The Light
K201HV	88.1 FM	Jansen, Colorado	78198	10	D	LMS	The Light
K220IY	91.9 FM	Lafayette, Colorado	140243	115	D	LMS	The Light
K220GH	91.9 FM	Lake George, Colorado	86446	75	D	LMS	The Light
K207BI	89.3 FM	Lamar, Colorado	18850	250	D	LMS	The Light
K211EQ	90.1 FM	New Castle, Colorado	94154	19	D	LMS	The Light
K204EX	88.7 FM	Paonia, Colorado	83456	62	D	LMS	The Legacy
K206BU	89.1 FM	Seibert, Colorado	78201	250	D	LMS	The Light
K215DA	90.9 FM	Silver Cliff, Colorado	92693	250	D	LMS	The Legacy
K218DB	91.5 FM	Vilas, Colorado	93691	250	D	LMS	Reflections
K207BK	89.3 FM	Walsh, Colorado	18828	250	D	LMS	Reflections
K220IM	91.9 FM	Brush, Colorado	92692	250	D	LMS	The Light
K220DE	106.3 FM	Windsor, Colorado	140261	10	D	LMS	The Light
K201EC	106.3 FM	Manitou Springs, Colorado	18884	99	D	LMS	The Legacy
K201HJ	106.3 FM	Lincoln Park, Colorado	106685	30	D	LMS	The Legacy
K205CM	106.3 FM	Salida, etc., Colorado	18561	100	D	LMS	The Legacy
K292GK	106.3 FM	Fort Collins, Colorado	140259	180	D	LMS	The Legacy
K267BR	106.3 FM	Woodland Park, Colorado	139103	90	D	LMS	The Legacy
K248AS	106.3 FM	Woodland Park, Colorado	139102	250	D	LMS	Reflections
K290AK	105.9 FM	Colorado Springs, Colorado	139094	99	D	LMS	Life Talk Radio
K247BP	97.3 FM	Pueblo, Colorado	139160	250	D	LMS	Life Talk Radio
