= KMZK =

Radio station in Clifton, Colorado

KLMZK
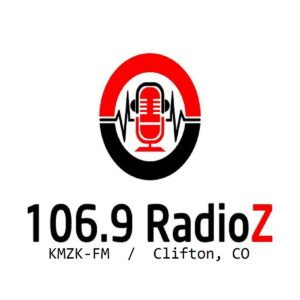
- Clifton, Colorado; United States
- Broadcast area: Grand Junction
- Frequency: 106.9 MHz
- Branding: 106.9 Radio Z

Programming
- Format: Alternative rock
- Affiliations: Compass Media Networks; Total Traffic and Weather Network

Ownership
- Owner: LD Grant, JD Northcutt and KD Harris; (Get Smashed Radio Broadcasting Network, LLC)

History
- First air date: 2011

Technical information
- Licensing authority: FCC
- Facility ID: 165324
- Class: C0
- Power: 100,000 watts
- HAAT: 440 meters (1,440 ft)
- Transmitter coordinates: 39°34′52.0″N 108°57′36.0″W

Links
- Public license information: Public file; LMS
- Webcast: Listen Live
- Website: 1069radioz.com

KMZK (106.9 FM) is a commercial alternative rock formatted broadcast radio station licensed to Clifton, Colorado, serving the Grand Junction, CO Metropolitan Statistical Area, Northwestern Colorado and Northeastern Utah. KMZK is owned and operated by LD Grant, JD Northcutt and KD Harris, through licensee Get Smashed Radio Broadcasting Network, LLC. This station's transmitter is on Baxter Pass, while its studios are located in Downtown Fruita, CO.

On May 10, 2021, KMZK rebranded as "106.9 Radio Z".
