= Aftersight =

American radio reading service

Aftersight, formerly the Audio Information Network of Colorado (AINC), and before that the Radio Reading Service of the Rockies (RRSR), was founded in 1990. It is based in Boulder, Colorado, United States, and is a non-profit, community and volunteer-based, radio reading service and audio information service for blind, visually impaired, and print-handicapped people in the state of Colorado. AINC provides access to printed material through sound recordings by volunteers.

The executive director is Kim Ann Wardlow.
