= KSTR-FM =

- Montrose, Colorado; United States
- Broadcast area: Grand Junction, Colorado
- Frequency: 96.1 MHz
- Branding: 96.1 K-Star

Programming
- Format: Classic rock
- Affiliations: United Stations Radio Networks

Ownership
- Owner: MBC Grand Broadcasting, Inc.
- Sister stations: KGLN, KKVT, KMGJ, KMOZ-FM, KNAM, KNZZ, KTMM

History
- First air date: 1980 (as KWDE)
- Former call signs: KWDE (1979–1985)
- Call sign meaning: "K-Star"

Technical information
- Licensing authority: FCC
- Facility ID: 21629
- Class: C0
- ERP: 100,000 watts
- HAAT: 335 meters
- Transmitter coordinates: 38.878°N 108.226°W
- Translator: 100.1 K261EU (Montrose)

Links
- Public license information: Public file; LMS
- Webcast: Listen live
- Website: www.961kstr.com

KSTR-FM (96.1 MHz) is a radio station broadcasting a Classic Rock format. Licensed to Montrose, Colorado, United States, it serves the Grand Junction area. The station is currently owned by MBC Grand Broadcasting, Inc.

KSTR is also the radio home on the Western Slope for the Denver Broncos.

The station was originally KWDE in Montrose with its transmitter at the Raspberry Electronics site near Montrose. The transmitter was relocated near Grand Junction in 1983 and the station was moved to Grand Junction as well.
