= KKVM =

- Vail, Colorado; United States
- Frequency: 104.7 MHz
- Branding: The Mile

Programming
- Format: Classic Hits

Ownership
- Owner: Steve Leigh; (KNS Broadcasting, LLC)

History
- Former call signs: KVMT (1975–1989); KSKE (1989–1990); KSKE-FM (1990–2009); KBTB (2009–2011)

Technical information
- Licensing authority: FCC
- Facility ID: 16269
- Class: C1
- ERP: 100,000 watts
- HAAT: 102 meters (335 ft)
- Transmitter coordinates: 39°38′5″N 106°26′47″W

Links
- Public license information: Public file; LMS
- Webcast: Listen live
- Website: www.themile.fm

KKVM (104.7 FM), known as The Mile, is a radio station broadcasting a Classic Hits format. Licensed to Vail, Colorado, United States, the station is currently owned by Steve Leigh through licensee KNS Broadcasting, LLC.

== History ==
The station was the first radio station in Vail. KVMT 104-7 signed on the air August 18, 1975. Originally owned by Radio Vail, Inc.

KVMT was sold in 1979 to Vail Mountain Broadcasters. The first transmitter was located on top of the Vail Ski area close to the Far East Shelter. KVMT broadcasts at a power of 100kw. In the 1980s, KVMT moved the transmitter location to the top of Davos' Trail. This location provided better reception. KVMT changed their call letters to KSKE on December 21, 1989. On January 29, 1990, the station changed its call sign to KSKE-FM. On September 8, 2009, the station changed its call sign to KBTB, and on April 26, 2011 to the current KKVM.

In 2011, the station call letters were changed to KKVM. The Mile was named after the popular background ski trail known as "The Mile" between Vail Mountain and Minturn, Colorado. KKVM subsequently went through numerous ownership and format changes before its current incarnation of playing Classic Hits.

The Mile is an affiliate of the syndicated Pink Floyd program "Floydian Slip" which airs on Saturday nights at 7pm.
