= KLZR (FM) =

- Westcliffe, Colorado; United States
- Broadcast area: Wet Mountain Valley
- Frequency: 91.7 MHz
- Branding: KLZR 91.7 FM

Programming
- Format: Variety
- Affiliations: National Federation of Community Broadcasters

Ownership
- Owner: Wet Mountain Broadcasting Corp.

History
- First air date: May 2004, as low-power station KWMV-LP
- Former call signs: KWMV-LP (2004–2015)
- Former frequencies: 95.9 MHz (2004–2015)

Technical information
- Licensing authority: FCC
- Facility ID: 173643
- Class: A
- ERP: 6,000 watts
- HAAT: −144 meters (−472 ft)
- Transmitter coordinates: 38°8′3.7″N 105°27′42″W

Links
- Public license information: Public file; LMS
- Webcast: Listen live
- Website: klzr.org

KLZR (91.7 FM) is a radio station licensed to serve the community of Westcliffe, Colorado. The station is owned by Wet Mountain Broadcasting Corp. It airs a variety format and is staffed primarily by volunteers from the surrounding Wet Mountain Valley community.

KLZR is the successor to KWMV-LP, a low-power FM station broadcasting at 95.9, which went on the air in May 2004. In September 2015, KLZR went on the air at 91.7 as a full-power station, replacing KWMV-LP, which went off the air September 12. On October 5, 2017, the Federal Communications Commission informed Crystal Mountain Center For the Performing Arts, KWMV-LP's owner that it was in the process of cancelling that station's license as it had been silent for over a year,; the KWMV license was canceled on November 6, 2017.
