= KMGJ =

Radio station in Grand Junction, Colorado

Coordinates: 39.0664°N 108.7454°W

- Grand Junction, Colorado; United States
- Broadcast area: Western Colorado
- Frequency: 93.1 MHz
- Branding: Magic 93.1

Programming
- Format: Top 40 (CHR)
- Affiliations: Compass Media Networks; Westwood One

Ownership
- Owner: MBC Grand Broadcasting, Inc.
- Sister stations: KGLN; KKVT; KMOZ-FM; KNAM; KNZZ; KSTR-FM; KTMM

History
- First air date: November 1, 1973 (as KQIX)
- Former call signs: KQIX (1973–1979); KQIX-FM (1979–1986); KQIX (1986–2000)
- Call sign meaning: "Magic Grand Junction"

Technical information
- Licensing authority: FCC
- Facility ID: 47115
- Class: C0
- ERP: 100,000 watts
- HAAT: 437 meters (1,434 ft)
- Translators: 96.5 K243CN (Montrose); 100.3 K262CB (Rifle)

Links
- Public license information: Public file; LMS
- Webcast: Listen live
- Website: www.931magic.com

KMGJ (93.1 FM) is a radio station broadcasting a contemporary hit radio format. Licensed to Grand Junction, Colorado, United States, it serves the Grand Junction area. The station is owned by MBC Grand Broadcasting, Inc.
