= KKVT =

Radio station in Grand Junction, Colorado

Coordinates: 39.066°N 108.745°W

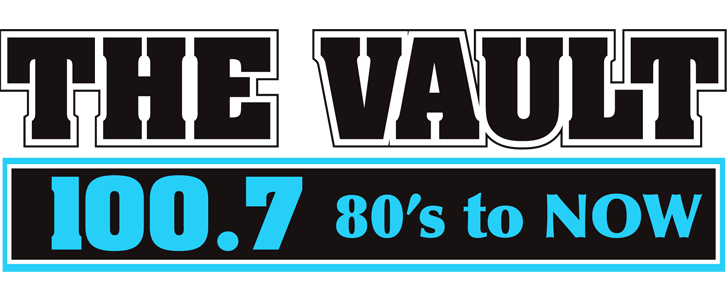
- Grand Junction, Colorado; United States
- Broadcast area: Grand Junction, Colorado
- Frequency: 100.7 MHz (HD Radio)
- Branding: The Vault 100.7

Programming
- Format: Adult hits
- Subchannels: HD2: 95.7 The Monkey (oldies); HD3: 103.9 The Planet (AAA); HD4: 101.9 Moose Legends (classic country)
- Affiliations: Premiere Networks; Westwood One

Ownership
- Owner: MBC Grand Broadcasting, Inc.
- Sister stations: KGLN; KMGJ; KMOZ-FM; KNAM; KNZZ; KSTR-FM; KTMM

History
- First air date: 1999
- Former call signs: KSNJ (1999–2001); KMOZ-FM (2001–2013)
- Call sign meaning: "Vault"

Technical information
- Licensing authority: FCC
- Facility ID: 81556
- Class: C1
- ERP: 30,000 watts
- HAAT: 475 meters (1,558 ft)
- Translator: See § Translators
- Repeater: HD2: 1490 KNAM (Silt)

Links
- Public license information: Public file; LMS
- Webcast: Listen live; HD2: Listen live; HD3: Listen live; HD4: Listen live
- Website: www.thevault1007.com; HD2: www.957themonkey.com; HD3: www.1039theplanet.com; HD4: www.mooselegends.com

KKVT (100.7 FM) is a radio station broadcasting an adult hits format. Licensed to Grand Junction, Colorado, United States, it serves the Grand Junction area. The station is currently owned by MBC Grand Broadcasting, Inc.

== History ==
On August 1, 2013, KMOZ-FM changed their call letters to KKVT and changed their format to adult hits, branded as "The Vault", swapping frequencies with KKVT 92.3 FM Grand Junction.

== KKVT-HD2 ==
On May 25, 2017, KKVT launched an oldies format on its HD2 subchannel, branded as "95.5 The Monkey" (in reflection of its simulcast on FM translator 95.7 K238BK). Due to interference reports from listeners to KRKQ in Mountain Village, Colorado, being filed with the FCC, the KKVT HD2 oldies format was rebranded as "95.7 The Monkey" and the translator frequency changed to 95.7 as of November 2, 2017.

== KKVT-HD3 ==
On May 25, 2017, KKVT launched an adult album alternative format on its HD3 subchannel, branded as "103.9 The Planet" (in reflection of its simulcast on FM 103.9 K279CB).

== Translators ==
KKVT is also broadcast on the following translators:

Broadcast translators for KKVT
Call sign	Frequency	City of license	FID	ERP (W)	Class	FCC info
K251AF	98.1 FM	Montrose, Colorado	76228	41 vertical	D	LMS
K271BA	102.1 FM	Rifle, Colorado	40809	50	D	LMS

Broadcast translators for KKVT-HD2
Call sign	Frequency	City of license	FID	ERP (W)	Class	FCC info
K239CP	95.7 FM	Grand Junction, Colorado	151513	250	D	LMS
K228EV	93.5 FM	Montrose, Colorado	138825	250	D	LMS
K246CC	97.1 FM	Delta, Colorado	147343	10	D	LMS

Broadcast translator for KKVT-HD3
Call sign	Frequency	City of license	FID	ERP (W)	Class	FCC info
K280GQ	103.9 FM	Grand Junction, Colorado	151256	99	D	LMS

Broadcast translator for KKVT-HD4
Call sign	Frequency	City of license	FID	ERP (W)	Class	FCC info
K270AY	101.9 FM	Grand Junction, Colorado	152271	50	D	LMS
