= KJOL (AM) =

Radio station in Grand Junction, Colorado

- Grand Junction, Colorado; United States
- Broadcast area: Grand Junction
- Frequency: 620 kHz

Programming
- Format: Christian radio

Ownership
- Owner: United Ministries

History
- First air date: June 19, 1957
- Former call signs: KSTR (2000–2001); KRDY (1999–2000); KSTR (1998–1999); KKGJ (1998); KKGM (1998); KBZS (1996–1998); KKGM (1994–1996); KKTK (1994); KSTR (1957–1994)

Technical information
- Licensing authority: FCC
- Facility ID: 21628
- Class: D
- Power: 5,000 watts (day); 79 watts (night)
- Transmitter coordinates: 39°7′34.9″N 108°38′15.3″W

Links
- Public license information: Public file; LMS
- Webcast: Listen Live
- Website: www.kjol.org

KJOL (620 AM) is a radio station broadcasting a Christian format. Licensed to Grand Junction, Colorado, United States, the station serves the Grand Junction area. The station is owned by United Ministries.

== History ==
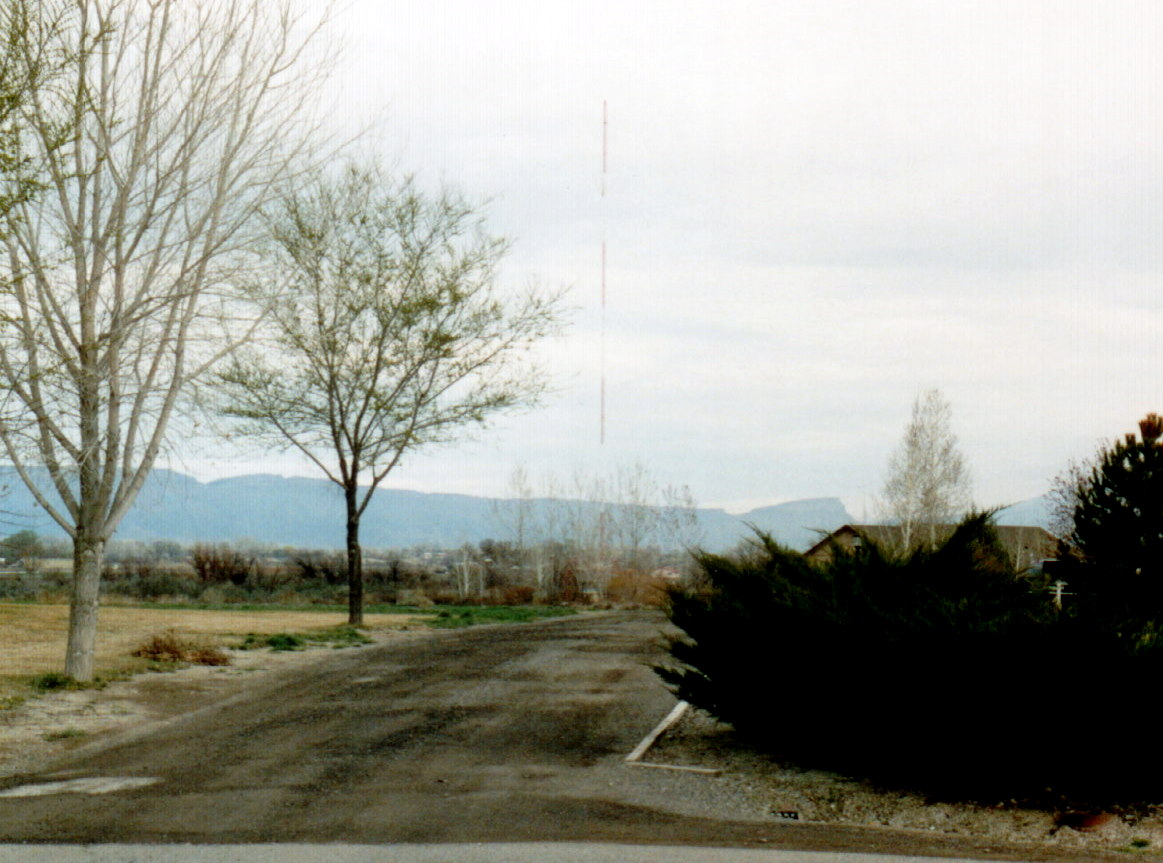
KJOL transmitter tower (shared with KTMM)

KJOL signed on the air on June 19, 1957 and was first licensed, as KSTR, to the Mountain States Broadcasting Company in Grand Junction, for 5,000 watts daytime-only on 620 kHz. The station changed its call sign to KKTK on March 1, 1994, to KKGM on October 12, 1994, and to KBZS on September 2, 1996.

=== Expanded Band assignment ===
On March 17, 1997, the Federal Communications Commission (FCC) announced that eighty-eight stations had been given permission to move to newly available "Expanded Band" transmitting frequencies, ranging from 1610 to 1700 kHz, with KBZS authorized to move from 620 to 1680 kHz. However, the station never procured the Construction Permit needed to implement the authorization, so the expanded band station was never built.

=== Later history ===
On January 30, 1998, the station became KKGM for a second time, and later call changes included KKGJ on August 14, 1998, KSTR for a second time on December 4, 1998, KRDY on March 15, 1999, and on March 22 of that year, KRDY became an affiliate of Radio Disney children's network. KSTR for a third time on August 7, 2000, and KJOL on April 23, 2001.

== Translators ==
KJOL is also heard on KJYE AM 1400 in Delta, Colorado and KJOL-FM 91.9 in Montrose, Colorado, as well as translators on 99.5 FM in Grand Junction, Colorado and on 91.3 FM in Paonia & Hotchkiss, Colorado.

Call sign	Frequency	City of license	FID	ERP (W)	Class	FCC info
KJYE	1400 FM	Delta, Colorado	6606	1,000	C	LMS
KJOL-FM	91.9 FM	Montrose, Colorado	175928	475	A	LMS
K258BP	99.5 FM	Grand Junction, Colorado	151525	250	D	LMS
K217FY	91.3 FM	Paonia, Colorado	49217	250	D	LMS
