= KCIC (FM) =

Radio station in Grand Junction, Colorado

Coordinates: 39.0780°N 108.4773°W

- Grand Junction, Colorado; United States
- Frequency: 88.5 MHz

Programming
- Format: religious radio

Ownership
- Owner: Pear Park Baptist Schools

History
- First air date: March 2, 1979
- Call sign meaning: Christ Is Coming

Technical information
- Licensing authority: FCC
- Facility ID: 52039
- Class: A
- ERP: 440 Watts
- HAAT: -107 meters

Links
- Public license information: Public file; LMS
- Website: KCIC website

KCIC (88.5 FM) is a radio station broadcasting a religious radio format. Licensed to Grand Junction, Colorado, United States, it serves the Grand Junction area. The station is currently owned by Pear Park Baptist Schools.

== History ==
KCIC signed on March 1, 1979, as the first Christian radio station in Grand Junction. It initially operated from a converted nursery in the back of the Pear Park Baptist Church complex, utilizing an all-volunteer staff and broadcasting religious music, church services and talk and teaching programs; the church built separate facilities in the early 1980s.
