= KMOZ-FM =

Radio station in Grand Junction, Colorado

Coordinates: 39.067°N 108.745°W

- Grand Junction, Colorado; United States
- Broadcast area: Grand Junction, Colorado
- Frequency: 92.3 MHz
- Branding: The Moose 92.3

Programming
- Format: Country

Ownership
- Owner: MBC Grand Broadcasting, Inc.
- Sister stations: KGLN; KKVT; KMGJ; KNAM; KNZZ; KSTR-FM; KTMM

History
- First air date: May 1, 1960 (as KREX-FM)
- Former call signs: KREX-FM (1960–1989); KVEE-FM (1989); KJYE-FM (1989–1997); KJYE (1997–2012); KKVT (2012–2013)

Technical information
- Licensing authority: FCC
- Facility ID: 39464
- Class: C
- ERP: 100,000 watts
- HAAT: 420 meters (1,380 ft)
- Translator: See § Translators

Links
- Public license information: Public file; LMS
- Webcast: Listen live
- Website: www.themoose923.com

KMOZ-FM (92.3 MHz) is a radio station broadcasting a country music format. Licensed to serve Grand Junction, Colorado, United States, the station is owned by MBC Grand Broadcasting, Inc.

== History ==
The full ID for KJYE recorded from Salt Lake City, Utah on June 12, 2009.

Between As KJYE, the station was known as "The Vault". It became KKVT briefly between 2012 and 2013. On August 1, 2013, KKVT and its adult hits format moved to 100.7 FM, swapping frequencies with country-formatted KMOZ-FM.

== Translators ==
In addition to the main station, KMOZ-FM is relayed by additional translators to widen its broadcast area.

Call sign	Frequency	City of license	State	Class	ERP (W)	FCC info
K272FT	102.3 FM	Montrose	Colorado	D	250	FCC (K272FT)
K277DC	103.3 FM	Rifle	Colorado	D	50	FCC (K277DC)
K271BG	102.1 FM	Moab	Utah	D	89	FCC (K271BG)
K281AJ	104.1 FM	Moab	Utah	D	250	FCC (K281AJ)
