= Mass media in Colorado Springs, Colorado =

Colorado Springs supports a diverse range of radio, television, and newspapers.

== Print ==
- The Colorado Catholic Herald, monthly, published by the Roman Catholic Diocese of Colorado Springs
- , weekly Southern Colorado Business Forum & Digest
- Colorado Springs Independent, weekly
- The Gazette, daily
- Hispania News, weekly
- The Westside Pioneer, bi-monthly
- The Front Range Voluntaryist, monthly

== Television ==
As of 2023 the Colorado Springs-Pueblo market was the 86th largest television market in the United States. The following is a list of over-the-air television stations serving the greater Colorado Springs metropolitan area.

Channel	Callsign	Affiliation	Subchannels	Owner	Notes	RF Channel
5.1	KOAA	NBC	5.1 NBC; 5.2 Court TV; 5.3 Grit; 5.4 Ion Plus; 5.5 Ion Television; 5.6 Shop LC; 5.7 HSN2	E. W. Scripps Company		25 (UHF)
8.1	KTSC	PBS	8.1 Rocky Mountain PBS; 8.2 PBS Kids; 8.3 Create/World	Rocky Mountain Public Broadcasting Network		8 (VHF)
11.1	KKTV	CBS	11.1 CBS; 11.2 MyNetworkTV/MeTV; 11.3 Outlaw	Gray Television		26 (UHF)
13.1	KRDO-TV	ABC	13.1 ABC; 13.2 Telemundo; 13.3 News; 13.4 Dabl; 13.5 QVC; 13.6 HSN; 13.7 Heroes & Icons	News-Press and Gazette Company		24 (UHF)
21.1	KXRM-TV	Fox	21.1 Fox; 21.2 The CW via KXTU-LD; 21.3 Ion Television; 21.4 Escape; 21.4 Ion Mystery	Nexstar Media Group		22 (UHF)
K17OE-D	PBS via KBDI-TV	12.1 PBS	Colorado Public Television		17 (UHF)	
38.1	KJCS-LD	EWTN	38.1 EWTN			14 (UHF)
48.1	KVSN-DT	Univision	48.1 Univision; 48.2 UniMas; 48.3 LATV; 48.4 TBD; 48.5 True Crime Network; 48.6 Charge!	Entravision Communications		27 (UHF)
51.1	KWHS-LD	CTN	51.1 CTN; 51.2 CTN Lifestyle	CTN		10 (VHF)
57.1	KXTU-LD	The CW	57.1 The CW; 57.2 Bounce TV; 57.3 Laff; 57.4 Antenna TV	Nexstar Media Group		20 (UHF)

== Radio ==
As of 2018, Colorado Springs is the 89th largest radio market in the United States. In addition to traditional AM and FM analog radio stations, there are 22 digital HD Radio channels. The following is a list of radio stations serving the greater Colorado Springs metropolitan area:

=== AM ===
Freq.	Callsign	Format	City of License	Notes
740	KVOR	News/Talk	Colorado Springs	ABC News Radio affiliate (CBS News Radio from 1930s-2007), also available as HD Radio
890	KCEG	Sports talk	Colorado Springs	NBC Sports Radio affiliate, also available as HD Radio
1040	KPPF	Classic hip hop	Monument	broadcasts from Colorado Springs; also available as HD Radio
1240	KRDO	News/Talk	Colorado Springs	ABC News Radio affiliate, simulcasts KRDO-FM and KRDO-TV newscasts
1300	KCSF	Sports talk	Colorado Springs	CBS Sports Radio, formerly Fox Sports Radio, also available as HD Radio
1460	KZNT	News/Talk	Colorado Springs	Fox News Radio and Salem Radio affiliate
1490	KXRE	Regional Mexican	Manitou Springs	Spanish language satellite of KBNO, Denver
1530	KQSC	Country	Colorado Springs	also available as HD Radio
1580	KFCS	Christian Talk	Colorado Springs	

=== FM ===
Freq.	Callsign	Format	City of License	Notes
88.1	K201EC	Christian	Manitou Springs	translator of KTPL, Pueblo
88.7	KCME	Classical	Manitou Springs	broadcasts from Colorado Springs; also HD Radio
89.7	KEPC	Alternative	Colorado Springs	PPCC college radio; also HD Radio
90.5	KTLF	Contemporary Christian	Colorado Springs	also two HD Radio
90.9	K215CB	Contemporary Christian	Manitou Springs	WAY-FM; translator of KXGR, Loveland
91.5	KRCC	Alternative	Colorado Springs	NPR; CC college radio; also 3 HD Radio
92.9	KKPK	Adult Contemporary	Colorado Springs	92.9 The Peak
94.3	KILO	Active Rock	Colorado Springs	94.3 KILO
94.7	K234AJ	Classical	Colorado Springs	translator of KVOD, Lakewood
95.1	KATC-FM	Country	Colorado Springs	95.1 Cat Country also HD Radio
96.1	KIBT	Rhythmic CHR	Fountain	96.1 The Beat, broadcasts from Colorado Springs; also 2 HD Radio
96.5	K243AM	News/Talk	Colorado Springs	NPR; translator of KCFR-FM, Denver
96.9	KCCY-FM	Country	Pueblo	broadcasts from Colorado Springs; also 2 HD Radio
97.7	KAFA	primarily modern rock	unlicensed	United States Air Force Academy
98.1	KKFM	Classic Rock	Colorado Springs	Classic Rock 98.1
98.5	K253AH	News	Colorado Springs	translator of KPFF-AM, Monuement
98.9	KKMG	Pop CHR	Pueblo	98.9 Magic-FM, broadcasts from Colorado Springs; also HD Radio
99.9	KVUU	Pop CHR	Pueblo	My 99.9, broadcasts from Colorado Springs; also 2 HD Radio
100.3	K262AQ	Country	Colorado Springs	translator of KSPK-FM, Walsenburg
100.7	KGFT	Christian	Pueblo	broadcasts from Colorado Springs
101.3	KFEZ	80s Music	Colorado	broadcasts from Colorado Springs; also online at Gnarly1013.com HD Radio
102.7	KBIQ	Contemporary Christian	Manitou Springs	broadcasts from Colorado Springs
103.9	KRXP	Alternative	Pueblo West	broadcasts from Colorado Springs
104.5	KSTY-FM1	Country	Colorado Springs	Booster of KSTY, Canon City
105.5	KRDO-FM	News/Talk	Security	broadcasts from Colorado Springs, ABC Radio News affiliate, simulcasts on KRDO-AM and carries newscasts from KRDO-TV
106.3	KKLI	Soft Adult Contemporary	Widefield	K-Lite, broadcasts from Colorado Springs; also 2 HD Radio
107.3	KQSC	Country	Colorado Springs	Independent country station on 107.3FM/1530AM
107.9	KBPL	Classic rock	Pueblo	Simulcast of KBPI Denver, broadcasts from Colorado Springs

== See also ==
- List of newspapers in Colorado
- List of television stations in Colorado
