= Media in Pueblo, Colorado =

Pueblo is a center of media in south-central Colorado. The following is a list of media outlets based in the city.

== Print ==
The Pueblo Chieftain is the city's primary newspaper, published daily. In addition, Colorado State University Pueblo publishes a weekly student newspaper, CSU Pueblo Today. There is also The Pueblo West View, and the PULP News Magazine.

== Radio ==
The Pueblo radio market includes all of Pueblo County. In its Fall 2013 ranking of radio markets by population, Arbitron ranked the Pueblo market 238th in the United States. Due to Pueblo's proximity to Colorado Springs, local listeners can also receive the signal of most radio stations broadcasting from the Colorado Springs radio market.

The following is a list of radio stations that broadcast from and/or licensed to Pueblo.

=== AM ===
Frequency	Callsign	Format	City of License	Notes
590	KCSJ	News/Talk	Pueblo, Colorado	-
690	KWRP	News/Talk	Pueblo, Colorado	-
970	KFEL	Religious	Pueblo, Colorado	-
1230	KDZA	Adult hits	Pueblo, Colorado	
1350	KUBE	Sports	Pueblo, Colorado	Fox Sports Radio
1480	KIXD	Country	Pueblo, Colorado	Broadcasts from Denver, Colorado

=== FM ===
Frequency	Callsign	Format	City of License	Notes
88.3	KTPL	Christian Talk	Pueblo, Colorado	Broadcasts from Colorado Springs, Colorado
89.5	KTSC-FM	Adult hits	Pueblo, Colorado	Colorado State University Pueblo college radio
89.9	KFRY	Religious	Pueblo, Colorado	-
91.9	KCFP	Classical	Pueblo, Colorado	Satellite station of KVOD, Lakewood, Colorado
93.3	K227DI	Alternative	Pueblo, Colorado	Translator of KEPC, Colorado Springs, Colorado
94.7	KRYE	Regional Mexican	Beulah, Colorado	Broadcasts from Pueblo
95.5	KPHT	Classic Hits	Rocky Ford, Colorado	Broadcasts from Pueblo
96.9	KCCY-FM	Country	Pueblo, Colorado	Broadcasts from Colorado Springs, Colorado
98.9	KKMG	Top 40	Pueblo, Colorado	Broadcasts from Colorado Springs, Colorado
99.9	KVUU	Hot Adult Contemporary	Pueblo, Colorado	Broadcasts from Colorado Springs, Colorado
100.7	KGFT	Religious	Pueblo, Colorado	Broadcasts from Colorado Springs, Colorado
104.9	KRNX	Contemporary worship music	Rye, Colorado	Broadcasts from Pueblo
105.9	KTPJ-LP	Religious	Pueblo, Colorado	-
106.9	KWRY	Christian adult contemporary	Pueblo, Colorado	-
107.9	KBPL	Mainstream rock	Pueblo, Colorado	Broadcasts from Colorado Springs, Colorado

== Television ==
Pueblo is in the Colorado Springs television market.

The following is a list of television stations that broadcast from and/or are licensed to Pueblo.

Display Channel	Network	Callsign	City of License	Notes
5.1	NBC	KOAA-TV	Pueblo, Colorado	-
5.2	-	KOAA-TV	Pueblo, Colorado	Local weather
8.1	PBS	KTSC	Pueblo, Colorado	Satellite station of KRMA-TV, Denver, Colorado
8.2	PBS Kids	KTSC	Pueblo, Colorado	Satellite station of KRMA-TV, Denver, Colorado
8.3	Create/World	KTSC	Pueblo, Colorado	Satellite station of KRMA-TV, Denver, Colorado
27.1	UniMás	KGHB-CD	Pueblo, Colorado	-
48.1	Univision	KVSN-DT	Pueblo, Colorado	Satellite station of KCEC, Denver, Colorado
48.2	UniMás	KVSN-DT	Pueblo, Colorado	Satellite station of KCEC, Denver, Colorado
48.3	LATV	KVSN-DT	Pueblo, Colorado	Satellite station of KCEC, Denver, Colorado
