= KRLN =

Radio station in Canon City, Colorado

- Canon City, Colorado; United States
- Broadcast area: Fremont County
- Frequency: 1400 kHz

Ownership
- Owner: Royal Gorge Broadcasting, LLC
- Sister stations: KSTY

History
- First air date: August 15, 1947
- Last air date: January 1, 2025

Technical information
- Licensing authority: FCC
- Facility ID: 35552
- Class: C
- Power: 1,000 watts (unlimited)
- Transmitter coordinates: 38°27′35″N 105°13′28″W

Links
- Public license information: Public file; LMS

KRLN (1400 AM) was a radio station broadcasting a talk format in Canon City, Colorado, United States. The station broadcast from 1947 to 2024 and was owned by Royal Gorge Broadcasting, LLC.

== History ==
KRLN began broadcasting on August 15, 1947. The station was founded by Raymond M. Becker and Melvin B. Williams, doing business as Royal Gorge Broadcasters. Raymond M. Becker sold KRLN to Joel L. Wiens and Norton E. Warner in late 1964; the sale was completed on January 1, 1965. Warner already owned KIMB in Kimball, Nebraska, and KKAN in Phillipsburg, Kansas.

For many years, KRLN signed off much earlier than other stations on the 1400 AM frequency, as a "Specified Hours" station. It was not until 1972 that KRLN was authorized for 24-hour operation.

Notable KRLN alumni include Gary Paxton, who went on to become a market-leading air personality in the Pueblo, Colorado, market. Former KRLN jock Jack Stevens went on to become a top-rated night jock on KYSN in Colorado Springs. Randy "Randy Jay" Saviano became well known at several Denver stations, including KDZA, KOOL 105 and KIMN. Joe Chiaro went on to work at KCSJ in Pueblo, KOA in Denver, and Fox News Radio in New York.

KRLN had an adult contemporary format by the 1990s, adding talk programming in April 1997. That December, the station's music shifted to oldies.

Warner Enterprises sold its stations — KRLN and KSTY, along with stations in Lincoln, Nebraska — to James Haber's JC Acquisition for $11.465 million in 1999, in conjunction with the sale of the Lincoln stations to Triad Broadcasting. The Warner family's Royal Gorge Broadcasting bought back KRLN and KSTY for $715,000 in 2000. On December 23, 2024, Royal Gorge Broadcasting announced that it would close KRLN and KSTY effective January 1, 2025; the two stations were the last to be owned by the Warner family. The Federal Communications Commission cancelled the station's license on July 15, 2026.
