= KFVR =

KFVR may refer to:

- KFVR (AM), a defunct radio station (1310 AM) formerly licensed to serve Crescent City, California, United States
- KRYE (FM), a radio station (94.7 FM) licensed to serve Beulah, Colorado, which held the call sign KFVR-FM from 2001 to 2019
- KRNX, a radio station (104.9 FM) licensed to serve Rye, Colorado, United States, which held the call sign KFVR-FM from 2019 to 2020
