= KKCS =

KKCS may refer to:

- KKCS (FM), a defunct radio station (104.7 FM) formerly licensed to Calhan, Colorado, United States
- KSTY, a radio station (104.5 FM) licensed to Cañon City, Colorado, which held the call sign KKCS from 2005 to 2007
- KXWA, a radio station (101.9 FM) licensed to Centennial, Colorado, which held the call sign KKCS-FM from 1979 to 2005 while located in Colorado Springs
- KZNT, a radio station (1460 AM) licensed to Colorado Springs, Colorado, which held the call sign KKCS from 1985 to 1989 and again from 1990 to 2003
- KQSC, a radio station (1530 AM) licensed to Colorado Springs, Colorado, which held the call sign KKCS from 1979 to 1982
