= KDZA =

KDZA may refer to:

- KDZA (AM), a radio station (1230 AM) licensed to serve Pueblo, Colorado, United States
- KUBE (AM), a radio station (1350 AM) licensed to serve Pueblo, which held the call sign KDZA from 2008 to 2012 and from 2018 to 2022
- KBPL, a radio station (107.9 FM) licensed to serve Pueblo, which held the call sign KDZA-FM from 1993 to 2018
- KDZA-TV, a television station (channel 3) licensed to serve Pueblo, which broadcast from 1953 to 1955
