= KWRY =

KWRY may refer to:

- KWRY (FM), a radio station (106.9 FM) licensed to Pueblo, Colorado, United States
- KRNX, a radio station (104.9 FM) licensed to Rye, Colorado, which held the call sign KWRY from 2020 to 2025
