= KCEG =

KCEG may refer to:

- KCEG, postnominals for a Knight Commander of the Order of the Eagle of Georgia
- KCEG (AM), a radio station (890 AM) licensed to serve Fountain, Colorado, United States
- KLVG (AM), a radio station (780 AM) licensed to serve Fountain, Colorado, which held the call sign KCEG from 2005 to 2022
