= KJQY =

KJQY may refer to:

- KEIM-LP, a defunct low-power radio station (103.1 FM) formerly licensed to serve Monument, Colorado, United States, which held the call sign KJQY-LP from 2015 to 2016
- KIQN (FM), a radio station (103.3 FM) licensed to serve Colorado City, Colorado, which held the call sign KJQY from 2006 to 2014 and in 2015
- KPHT, a radio station (95.5 FM) licensed to serve Rocky Ford, Colorado, which held the call sign KJQY from 2002 to 2005
- KSSX, a radio station (95.7 FM} licensed to serve Carlsbad, California, which held the call sign KJQY from 2001 to 2002
- KMYI, a radio station (94.1 FM) licensed to serve San Diego, California, which held the call sign KJQY from 1998 to 2001
- KLQV, a radio station (102.9 FM) licensed to serve San Diego, California, which held the call sign KJQY from 1997 to 1998
- KSON (FM), a radio station (103.7 FM) licensed to serve San Diego, California, which held the call sign KJQY from 1979 to 1995
