= KRCN =

- Longmont, Colorado; United States
- Broadcast area: Denver-Boulder-Longmont and Northern Colorado
- Frequency: 1060 kHz

Programming
- Format: Catholic radio
- Affiliations: Catholic Radio Network

Ownership
- Owner: Catholic Radio Network, Inc.
- Sister stations: KCRN, KFEL

History
- First air date: December 1949; 76 years ago
- Former frequencies: 1050 kHz (1949–1965)
- Call sign meaning: Former branding as the Radio Colorado Network

Technical information
- Licensing authority: FCC
- Facility ID: 70625
- Class: D
- Power: 50,000 watts (day); 111 watts (night)
- Transmitter coordinates: 40°16′51″N 104°56′25″W (day); 40°11′28″N 105°07′35″W (night)
- Translator: 92.1 K221GI (Greeley)

Links
- Public license information: Public file; LMS
- Webcast: Listen Live
- Website: www.catholicradionetwork.com

KRCN (1060 AM) is a radio station broadcasting a Catholic radio format. Licensed to Longmont, Colorado, the station is owned and operated by Catholic Radio Network, Inc., which has a network of stations in Missouri, Kansas, and Colorado. In Colorado, the Catholic Radio Network also operates KFEL 970 AM in Colorado Springs and KCRN 1120 AM in Limon.

KRCN broadcasts at 50,000 watts, the maximum power for FCC-licensed AM radio stations. Because AM 1060 is a clear channel frequency reserved for Class A XECPAE Mexico City and KYW Philadelphia, KRCN must greatly reduce nighttime power. It drops to only 111 watts at sunset. KRCN can also be heard on an FM translator station in Greeley, Colorado, 92.1 K221GI.

== History ==
Logo as the Radio Colorado Network

In December 1949, the station first signed on as KLMO, originally at 1050 kHz. It was a 250-watt daytimer, required to be off the air at night, and owned by the Longmont Broadcasting Company. In 1965, it shifted to 1060 kHz, and in the 1970s, increased its power to 10,000 watts, but still daytime only. In the 1980s, KLMO received Federal Communications Commission approval to broadcast around the clock, but with only a small amount of power at night.

The station aired a full service country music format for Longmont and the northern suburbs of Denver. KRCN, began broadcasting the Business and Personal Finance format under the branding "The Radio Colorado Network" on March 22, 2000. This format targeted the greater Denver metropolitan area. The Radio Colorado Network was an ambitious regional effort that included several other AM signals in the state. KRCN-1060 AM was the flagship station for a network that included KVLE 610 AM (Vail) KREL 1580 AM (Colorado Springs) and KGRE 1450 AM (Greeley) (at least temporarily).

On January 1, 2015, KRCN became an owned and operated affiliate of the Catholic Radio Network, based in Kansas City, Missouri.
