= KGRE =

KGRE may refer to:

- KGRE (AM), a radio station (1450 AM) licensed to serve Greeley, Colorado, United States
- KGRE-FM, a radio station (102.1 FM) licensed to serve Estes Park, Colorado
