= KIQN =

KIQN may refer to:

- KIQN (FM), a radio station (103.3 FM) licensed to serve Colorado City, Colorado, United States
- KEIM-LP, a defunct low-power radio station (103.1 FM) formerly licensed to serve Monument, Colorado, which held the call sign KIQN-LP from 2014 to 2015
- KWRY (FM), a radio station (106.9 FM) licensed to serve Pueblo, Colorado, which held the call sign KIQN from 2009 to 2014
