= KRYE =

KRYE may refer to:

- KRYE (FM), a radio station (94.7 FM) licensed to serve Beulah, Colorado, United States
- KRNX, a radio station (104.9 FM) licensed to serve Rye, Colorado, which held the call sign KRYE from 2005 to 2019
