= KJME =

KJME may refer to:

- KLVG (AM), a radio station (780 AM) licensed to serve Fountain, Colorado, United States, which held the call sign KJME from 2022 to 2025
- KCEG (AM), a radio station (890 AM) licensed to serve Fountain, Colorado, which held the call sign KJME from 2005 to 2022
