= KCCY =

KCCY may refer to:

- KCCY-FM, a radio station (96.9 FM) licensed to serve Pueblo, Colorado, United States
- KUBE (AM), a radio station (1350 AM) licensed to serve Pueblo, Colorado, which held the call sign KCCY from 2012 to 2018
- Northeast Iowa Regional Airport (ICAO code KCCY)
