= KCMN =

KCMN may refer to:

- KCMN-LD, a low-power television station (channel 28, virtual 42) licensed to serve Kansas City, Missouri, United States
- KQSC, a radio station (1530 AM) licensed to serve Colorado Springs, Colorado, United States, which held the call sign KCMN from 1982 to 2015
