= KIBT =

Coordinates: 38.74555°N 104.86219°W

- Fountain, Colorado; United States
- Broadcast area: Colorado Springs metropolitan area
- Frequency: 96.1 MHz (HD Radio)
- Branding: 96-1 The Beat

Programming
- Format: Rhythmic contemporary
- Subchannels: HD2: Classic R&B (J. Anthony Brown Radio Show)
- Affiliations: Compass Media Networks

Ownership
- Owner: iHeartMedia, Inc.; (iHM Licenses, LLC)
- Sister stations: KBPL, KCCY-FM, KCSJ, KKLI, KPHT, KUBE, KVUU

History
- First air date: 1993
- Former call signs: KBIQ (1993–1996); KPRZ (1996–1999); KMOM (1999–2004)
- Call sign meaning: BT for "Beat"

Technical information
- Licensing authority: FCC
- Facility ID: 66669
- Class: C2
- ERP: 460 watts
- HAAT: 661 meters (2,169 ft)

Links
- Public license information: Public file; LMS
- Webcast: Listen Live; Listen Live (HD2)
- Website: beatcolorado.iheart.com/

KIBT (96.1 FM) is a rhythmic contemporary formatted radio station serving the Colorado Springs area as well as nearby Pueblo, Colorado. The iHeartMedia, Inc. station's community of license is Fountain, Colorado, United States.

== History ==
The 96.1 signal signed on in 1993 as Christian AC KBIQ, and was originally owned by The Word in Music Inc. which is now known today as Bethesda Christian Broadcasting. TWIM was a non-profit corporation which did on-air fundraisers for the station but sold commercial air time.

In 1996, Salem Communications brought KBIQ and continued the Christian AC format. During the same year, Salem brought crosstown KIKX 102.7 FM and moved the Christian AC format and call letters to that respected frequency. Salem then adopted the call letters KPRZ for 96.1 and flipped it to a Praise & Worship format and adopting the moniker "Praise 96."

In 1999, Salem entered an agreement with AMFM Inc. (which would be absorbed into Clear Channel) to swap stations. As part of the deal, Salem would acquire KSKY in Dallas-Fort Worth while AMFM would acquire KPRZ-FM. After the station swap, KPRZ-FM flipped to a classic rock format as KMOM (Mother 96-1).

KMOM started as a classic rock format adopting the moniker "Classic Rock That Really Rocks," competing with cross-town competitors KKFM and KYZX. They also added the syndicated Bob & Tom Show to the morning lineup. Clear Channel later altered the format of KMOM to combine classic rock with more newer rock titles to compete with competitor KILO, adopting the moniker "Rock That Really Rocks", and added Tom Leykis afternoons for a short time in 2004. The station never really took off ratings or revenue wise, and Clear Channel remained committed to the format until October 2004 when it flipped to its current Rhythmic format as KIBT. Bob & Tom, which gained popularity in the Colorado Springs market, was quickly picked up by KKFM after the format flip.
