= Kiwi Radio (disambiguation) =

Kiwi Radio is a pirate radio broadcaster transmitting from New Zealand.

Kiwi Radio may also refer to:

- KiWi Radio (radio show), a syndicated teen hits radio show
- Kiwi FM, a New Zealand radio network
- KIWI, a commercial radio station in McFarland, California

== See also ==
- List of radio stations in New Zealand
- Radio in New Zealand
