= 1928 United States presidential election in Colorado =

- November 6, 1928

Nominee	Herbert Hoover	Al Smith
Party	Republican	Democratic
Home state	California	New York
Running mate	Charles Curtis	Joseph T. Robinson
Electoral vote	6	0
Popular vote	253,872	133,131
Percentage	64.72%	33.94%
County results
Hoover
50–60%
60–70%
70–80%
Smith
50–60%
60–70%
President before election
Calvin Coolidge
Republican
Elected President
Herbert Hoover
Republican

The 1928 United States presidential election in Colorado took place on November 6, 1928, as part of the 1928 United States presidential election which was held throughout all contemporary forty-eight states. Voters chose six representatives, or electors to the Electoral College, who voted for president and vice president.

Although Colorado had been strongly Democratic-leaning between 1896 and 1916 (due to the Free Silver movement), the nomination of Catholic New York Governor Smith was very poorly received throughout heavily white and Protestant Colorado. The state had been all but ruled by the Ku Klux Klan for a number of years early in the decade, and the strong anti-Catholic sentiment remained outside the heavily Mexican-American south-central part of the state. Although Smith did make large gains in the Mexican-American counties, Hoover gained greatly over Calvin Coolidge in 1924 by up to 30 percent in the heavily populated Front Range counties and Colorado consequently became the seventh most Republican state in the nation, voting 14 percentage points more Republican than the nation at-large.

Hoover's is the best Republican presidential performance in Colorado's history, and the second-best by any candidate behind William Jennings Bryan in 1896 when he was overwhelmingly supported by the state's powerful silver mining industry.

== Results ==
Presidential Candidate	Running Mate	Party	Electoral Vote (EV)	Popular Vote (PV)	
Herbert Hoover of California	Charles Curtis	Republican	6	253,872	64.72%
Alfred E. Smith	Joseph T. Robinson	Democratic	0	156,319	33.94%
Norman Thomas	James Maurer	Socialist	0	3,472	0.89%
Frank E. Webb	Will Vereen	Farmer-Labor	0	1,092	0.28%
William Z. Foster	Benjamin Gitlow	Workers Communist	0	675	0.17%

=== Results by county ===
County	Herbert Clark Hoover Republican		Alfred Emmanuel Smith Democratic		Norman Mattoon Thomas Socialist		Frank E. Webb Farmer-Labor		William Z. Foster Communist		Margin	
County	%	#	%	#	%	#	%	#	%	#	%	#
Baca	78.48%	2,108	19.51%	524	1.56%	42	0.30%	8	0.15%	4	58.97%	1,584
Morgan	76.10%	4,197	22.52%	1,242	1.03%	57	0.18%	10	0.16%	9	53.58%	2,955
El Paso	75.28%	16,243	23.49%	5,069	1.05%	227	0.13%	29	0.05%	10	51.78%	11,174
Otero	74.88%	5,788	24.27%	1,876	0.52%	40	0.25%	19	0.09%	7	50.61%	3,912
Logan	71.92%	4,377	26.62%	1,620	0.72%	44	0.58%	35	0.16%	10	45.30%	2,757
Bent	72.13%	1,957	27.31%	741	0.29%	8	0.18%	5	0.07%	2	44.82%	1,216
Prowers	71.50%	3,228	26.93%	1,216	0.84%	38	0.55%	25	0.18%	8	44.56%	2,012
Elbert	71.38%	1,933	27.25%	738	0.89%	24	0.41%	11	0.07%	2	44.13%	1,195
Larimer	70.94%	8,213	27.66%	3,203	0.86%	100	0.40%	46	0.14%	16	43.27%	5,010
Washington	69.99%	2,132	27.94%	851	1.25%	38	0.66%	20	0.16%	5	42.06%	1,281
Arapahoe	70.29%	6,086	28.44%	2,463	0.80%	69	0.38%	33	0.09%	8	41.84%	3,623
Yuma	69.07%	3,401	28.09%	1,383	1.87%	92	0.81%	40	0.16%	8	40.98%	2,018
Weld	69.58%	13,719	29.22%	5,762	0.62%	123	0.44%	87	0.13%	26	40.36%	7,957
Lincoln	69.11%	2,110	29.09%	888	0.85%	26	0.92%	28	0.03%	1	40.03%	1,222
Jefferson	69.09%	6,754	29.46%	2,880	0.99%	97	0.32%	31	0.13%	13	39.63%	3,874
Fremont	68.79%	5,365	30.16%	2,352	0.83%	65	0.17%	13	0.05%	4	38.63%	3,013
Kiowa	67.59%	1,024	30.23%	458	1.12%	17	0.99%	15	0.07%	1	37.36%	566
Delta	67.32%	3,731	30.17%	1,672	1.61%	89	0.72%	40	0.18%	10	37.15%	2,059
Montrose	67.27%	2,873	30.37%	1,297	1.50%	64	0.73%	31	0.14%	6	36.90%	1,576
Kit Carson	67.37%	2,486	30.81%	1,137	1.03%	38	0.70%	26	0.08%	3	36.56%	1,349
Boulder	67.48%	9,457	31.13%	4,363	0.92%	129	0.28%	39	0.19%	27	36.35%	5,094
Sedgwick	67.51%	1,247	31.40%	580	0.81%	15	0.22%	4	0.05%	1	36.11%	667
Phillips	65.16%	1,440	31.90%	705	2.49%	55	0.45%	10	0.00%	0	33.26%	735
Mesa	65.76%	6,446	32.88%	3,223	0.92%	90	0.36%	35	0.08%	8	32.88%	3,223
Rio Blanco	65.50%	860	32.67%	429	1.45%	19	0.15%	2	0.23%	3	32.83%	431
Pueblo	65.65%	15,541	33.29%	7,881	0.74%	174	0.20%	47	0.13%	30	32.36%	7,660
Crowley	65.42%	1,243	33.42%	635	0.63%	12	0.53%	10	0.00%	0	32.00%	608
Moffat	64.56%	1,346	34.05%	710	0.96%	20	0.34%	7	0.10%	2	30.50%	636
Cheyenne	63.85%	945	33.78%	500	1.55%	23	0.81%	12	0.00%	0	30.07%	445
Douglas	64.25%	1,107	35.00%	603	0.58%	10	0.17%	3	0.00%	0	29.25%	504
Rio Grande	64.03%	2,254	34.83%	1,226	0.60%	21	0.37%	13	0.17%	6	29.20%	1,028
Denver	63.40%	73,543	35.55%	41,238	0.63%	736	0.13%	150	0.29%	335	27.85%	32,305
Eagle	63.18%	1,014	35.51%	570	0.75%	12	0.37%	6	0.19%	3	27.66%	444
Adams	63.10%	4,031	35.46%	2,265	0.85%	54	0.49%	31	0.11%	7	27.65%	1,766
Park	62.82%	740	35.57%	419	1.10%	13	0.42%	5	0.08%	1	27.25%	321
Saguache	62.62%	1,491	35.87%	854	1.18%	28	0.17%	4	0.17%	4	26.75%	637
Montezuma	62.37%	1,341	35.91%	772	1.30%	28	0.42%	9	0.00%	0	26.47%	569
Grand	62.15%	770	36.40%	451	1.29%	16	0.08%	1	0.08%	1	25.75%	319
Clear Creek	61.05%	790	37.17%	481	1.55%	20	0.23%	3	0.00%	0	23.88%	309
Jackson	60.21%	401	37.39%	249	1.50%	10	0.45%	3	0.45%	3	22.82%	152
Garfield	60.03%	2,435	38.51%	1,562	0.94%	38	0.42%	17	0.10%	4	21.52%	873
Custer	58.88%	600	38.17%	389	2.45%	25	0.29%	3	0.20%	2	20.71%	211
Chaffee	59.49%	1,880	38.92%	1,230	1.17%	37	0.22%	7	0.19%	6	20.57%	650
La Plata	59.58%	2,837	39.31%	1,872	0.84%	40	0.17%	8	0.10%	5	20.26%	965
Alamosa	58.23%	1,759	41.01%	1,239	0.50%	15	0.23%	7	0.03%	1	17.21%	520
Routt	57.36%	2,304	40.95%	1,645	1.17%	47	0.32%	13	0.20%	8	16.41%	659
Dolores	55.92%	387	40.17%	278	3.18%	22	0.29%	2	0.43%	3	15.75%	109
Archuleta	56.48%	610	41.39%	447	1.57%	17	0.56%	6	0.00%	0	15.09%	163
San Miguel	54.91%	721	42.19%	554	1.29%	17	0.38%	5	1.22%	16	12.72%	167
Gunnison	55.21%	1,456	43.04%	1,135	1.25%	33	0.30%	8	0.19%	5	12.17%	321
Gilpin	55.17%	299	43.54%	236	1.11%	6	0.18%	1	0.00%	0	11.62%	63
Hinsdale	53.78%	128	44.54%	106	1.68%	4	0.00%	0	0.00%	0	9.24%	22
Summit	53.16%	362	44.93%	306	1.76%	12	0.15%	1	0.00%	0	8.22%	56
Teller	52.04%	1,184	45.58%	1,037	1.80%	41	0.31%	7	0.26%	6	6.46%	147
Ouray	51.49%	535	46.10%	479	1.54%	16	0.87%	9	0.00%	0	5.39%	56
Pitkin	50.95%	485	47.69%	454	0.95%	9	0.42%	4	0.00%	0	3.26%	31
Huerfano	49.15%	3,260	50.40%	3,343	0.30%	20	0.09%	6	0.06%	4	-1.25%	-83
Conejos	45.24%	1,463	52.32%	1,692	1.76%	57	0.34%	11	0.34%	11	-7.08%	-229
Las Animas	44.74%	5,367	53.85%	6,459	1.24%	149	0.10%	12	0.07%	8	-9.10%	-1,092
Mineral	41.14%	144	53.43%	187	5.43%	19	0.00%	0	0.00%	0	-12.29%	-43
Lake	40.10%	990	58.69%	1,449	0.93%	23	0.04%	1	0.24%	6	-18.59%	-459
San Juan	37.13%	277	58.45%	436	3.62%	27	0.40%	3	0.40%	3	-21.31%	-159
Costilla	37.33%	657	60.80%	1,070	0.85%	15	0.91%	16	0.11%	2	-23.47%	-413
