= KAVA =

KAVA may refer to:

- KAVA (FM), a radio station (89.5 FM) licensed to serve Kimball, Nebraska, United States
- KIXD, a radio station (1480 AM) licensed to serve Pueblo, Colorado, United States, which held the call sign KAVA from 1998 to 2023
- KCNR, a radio station (1460 AM) licensed to serve Shasta, California, United States, which held the call sign KAVA from 1967 to 1996
