= KCRN =

KCRN may refer to:

- KCRN (AM), a radio station (1120 AM) licensed to serve Limon, Colorado, United States
- KCCE (AM), a radio station (1340 AM) licensed to serve San Angelo, Texas, United States, which held the call sign KCRN from 1991 to 2018
- KSAO (FM), a radio station (93.9 FM) licensed to serve San Angelo, Texas, which held the call sign KCRN-FM from 1991 to 2018
