= CW 57 =

CW 57 may refer to one of the following television stations in the U.S. affiliated with The CW:

== Current ==
- KXTU-LD in Colorado Springs, Pueblo (O&O)

== Former ==
- WBUW (now WIFS) in Madison, Wisconsin (2006–2016)
- WPSG in Philadelphia, Pennsylvania (2006–2023)
