= KRXP =

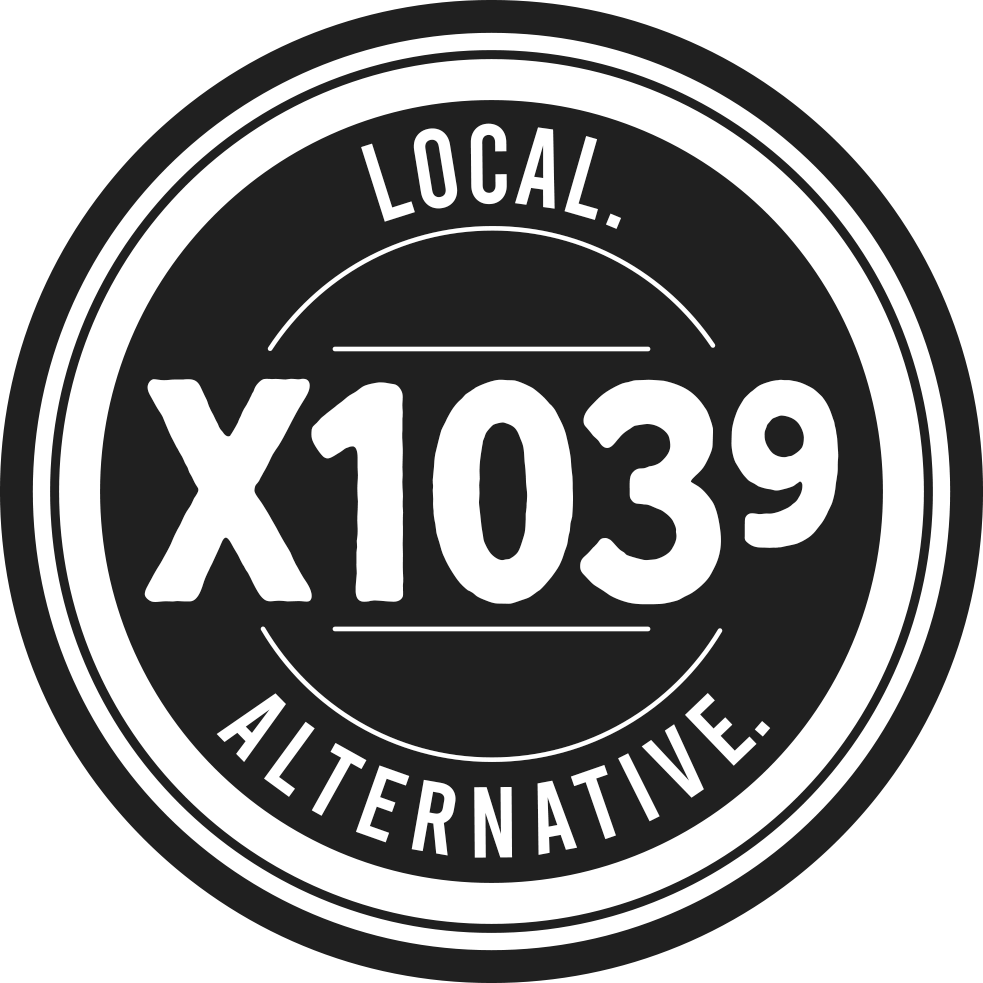
- Pueblo West, Colorado; United States
- Broadcast area: Colorado Springs, Colorado
- Frequency: 103.9 MHz
- Branding: X103-9

Programming
- Format: Modern rock
- Affiliations: Colorado College Tiger Hockey

Ownership
- Owner: Bahakel Communications; (Colorado Springs Radio Broadcasters, Inc.)
- Sister stations: KILO

History
- First air date: 1993
- Former call signs: KZKG (1991–1993); KYZX (1993–2008)
- Former frequencies: 104.5 MHz (1993–1999)
- Call sign meaning: "Rock Experience"

Technical information
- Licensing authority: FCC
- Facility ID: 53845
- Class: C2
- ERP: 1,750 watts
- HAAT: 657 meters (2,156 ft)
- Transmitter coordinates: 38°44′44″N 104°51′42″W

Links
- Public license information: Public file; LMS
- Webcast: Listen live
- Website: x1039radio.com

KRXP (103.9 FM, "X103.9") is a radio station licensed to Pueblo West, Colorado, United States. Owned by Bahakel Communications, it broadcasts an alternative rock format.

== History ==
The station went on the air on 104.5 MHz in 1993 as KYZX, a hot adult contemporary station co-owned with KCSJ and KNKN. In March 1996, the format was changed to country, using ABC Radio's Real Country network. This was replaced with classic rock, also supplied by ABC, in May 1998.

Pueblo Broadcasters sold KYZX, KGHF, and KCSJ to Cy Bahakel's Colorado Springs Radio Broadcasters, owner of KILO in Colorado Springs, for $4.5 million in 1999. Later that year, KYZX swapped frequencies with KSTY in Cañon City and moved to 103.9; it also changed its city of license from Pueblo to Pueblo West.

KYZX continued its classic rock format as 103.9 The Eagle until October 31, 2008, when it adopted the 103-9 RXP moniker, changed the call letters to KRXP, and began a year-long transition from classic rock to alternative rock. On April 29, 2021, the station rebranded as X103-9 with no change in format.
