= KPPF =

- Monument, Colorado; United States
- Broadcast area: Colorado Springs metropolitan area
- Frequency: 1040 kHz
- Branding: Power Talk 1040

Programming
- Format: News/talk
- Affiliations: Genesis Communications Network; Premiere Networks; Radio America; Townhall News; Rocky Mountain Vibes

Ownership
- Owner: Power 95.7, LLC

History
- First air date: 1986 (as KKRE)
- Former call signs: KRTS (1986); KKRE (1986–1989); KCBR (1989–2020)

Technical information
- Licensing authority: FCC
- Facility ID: 10846
- Class: D
- Power: 15,000 watts day; 2,000 watts critical hours
- Transmitter coordinates: 38°49′8″N 104°46′32″W
- Translators: 95.7 K239CH (Colorado Springs); 98.5 K253AH (Colorado Springs)

Links
- Public license information: Public file; LMS
- Webcast: Listen Live
- Website: powermediaradio.com

KPPF (1040 AM) is a commercial radio station licensed to Monument, Colorado, and serving the Colorado Springs metropolitan area. Owned by Power 95.7, LLC, it broadcasts a news/talk radio format, calling itself "Power Talk 1040." The studios and offices are at 3455 Briargate Blvd in Colorado Springs. Most of the schedule is nationally syndicated conservative talk shows including Dana Loesch, Michael Medved, Eric Metaxas and Michael Berry.

By day, KPPF is powered at 15,000 watts using a non-directional antenna. But because 1040 AM is a United States clear-channel frequency, KPPF is a daytimer. It must leave the air from sunset to sunrise to protect the nighttime skywave signal of Class A WHO in Des Moines, the dominant station on the frequency. Programming is also heard around the clock on two FM translators in Colorado Springs: 95.7 K239CH and 98.5 K253AH.

== History ==
The station first signed on the air in 1986. It was KKRE, broadcasting a Christian Contemporary format and one a handful of stations at the time that did an all Christian music format. The studio was located in Monument during its early years.

In late 1988, facing financial shortfalls, KKRE flipped to a Business News/Talk format via the Colorado Springs-based network BRN (Business Radio Network). KKRE later changed its call sign to KCBR, standing for "Colorado's Business Radio". In 1991, after BRN switched its affiliation to another station, KCBR went dark.

By 1992, KCBR was acquired by the owners of KCMN, one of the first media duopolies in America. KCBR returned to the air with a mix of Christian talk and teaching and Christian AC. Now the call letters stood for "Colorado's K-Bright." KCBR ran Christian talk shows during the morning and midday hours and played Christian music in the afternoons, nights and weekends. With the sign on of KBIQ on the FM band, doing a full time Christian Contemporary format, KCBR gradually phased out its Christian AC music. In the late 1990s, KCBR and KCMN were sold to Crawford Broadcasting Company. Crawford soon adopted the nickname "Victory Radio" for KCBR.

In August 2006, Don Crawford Jr. son of Crawford Broadcasting owner Don Crawford Sr. bought KCBR and KCMN, for an undisclosed amount. (Formally, KCBR was purchased by a new company called DJR Broadcasting, owned by Crawford Jr.) The new owner said that the formats and staffing would stay the same at the stations. Crawford Jr. had begun working at Crawford Broadcasting in 1989, and had been a regional manager since 1994, responsible for the company's stations in Colorado Springs, Denver, Dallas, Los Angeles, and San Francisco. Following the purchase, Crawford continued to manage KAAM in Dallas.

Beginning in 2007, KCBR began broadcasting in HD Radio format.

In 2012, DJR Broadcasting sold KCBR and KCMN to the Pueblo Radio Group. The new owners gradually made changes to the station, eventually dropping the Christian Talk programs in August. The station transitioned to a standard News/Talk format in October. Longtime KCMN/KCBR personality Tron Simpson was heard from 6AM-8AM and 1PM-2PM, radio veteran Lee Roberts from 8AM-10AM, National Sports Talk host Jim Rome from 10AM-1PM, syndicated talker Phil Valentine from 2PM-3PM, and longtime local talk radio personality Chuck Baker along with local restaurant owner Chuck Graybill doing afternoons from 3PM-5PM. On March 27, 2013, Laura Ingraham replaced Jim Rome in the 10AM-1PM time slot, with crosstown station KCSF picking up Rome's show. After about 22 years on KCMN/KCBR, Tron Simpson left the station after October 10, 2014 pending management and format changes with KCBR. Simpson resumed his daily radio talk show online at www.tronshow.com and was picked up by crosstown KVOR for a Sunday afternoon local talk program.

On November 1, 2014, KCBR flipped to variety hits as Tailgate 98, also broadcast on FM translator K253AH 98.5 FM in Colorado Springs. The following year, the station switched to oldies as Crusin' 98.5. On May 4, 2016, KCBR flipped to classic hip-hop as Blazin' 98.5, which also featured programming catering to cannabis in Colorado.

In October 2018, KCBR switched to a hybrid format of comedy (from the Today's Comedy network) and 90's hits, branded as Hits & Giggles 98.5/95.7. The flip coincided with the introduction of a second translator, K239CH.

Effective June 19, 2019, Pueblo Radio Group sold KCBR and translator K239CH to SGMK Communications Partners for $350,000.

In August 2020, KCBR and its translators flipped back to classic hip hop, again as "Blazin' 98.5."

Effective November 30, 2020, SGMK Communications sold KCBR and the translator to Power 95.7, LLC for $185,000. The station changed its call sign to KPPF on December 16, 2020.

In February 2021, KPPF began stunting with music from many genres, while promoting a forthcoming flip to a hybrid news/talk and adult contemporary format.

By December 2021, the station has since gone to a full-time news/talk format branded as "Power Talk 1040".
