= KiWi Radio (radio show) =

- Genre: Top 40/CHR, teen hits
- Running time: 2 hours
- Country of origin: United States
- Starring: Various teen celebrities
- Executive producer(s): Chris Pickett
- Original release: 2008 – July 2010

KiWi Radio was an American teen hits radio show targeted to a 12-17 age demographic. It focused on playing contemporary hit radio (CHR) music, also known as Top 40 and songs from teen artists, such as Miley Cyrus, Demi Lovato, The Jonas Brothers, Vanessa Hudgens, etc.

The 2 hour syndicated radio show was hosted by a new celebrity each week, and previously aired on four stations, KVUU "My 99.9" in Colorado Springs, KSME "96.1 Kiss FM" in Ft. Collins, KRQQ "93.7 KRQ" in Tucson and WDKS "106.1 Kiss Fm in Evansville. KiWi Radio was programmed by Chris Pickett, also program director of KVUU in Colorado Springs.

KiWi Radio ended its two-year run in July 2010.

== Hosts ==
A few former KiWi Radio Hosts:

- Miley Cyrus
- Corbin Bleu
- The Pussycat Dolls
- Jordan Pruitt
- Boys Like Girls
- Jesse McCartney
- Daughtry
- Metro Station
- Fall Out Boy
- Jason Mraz
- Miranda Cosgrove
- The Ting Tings
- Tiffany Thornton
- Kristinia DeBarge
- Clique Girlz
- All-American Rejects
- Emily Osment
- The Pussycat Dolls
- Natasha Bedingfield
- Nick Lachey
- The White Tie Affair
- Bow Wow
- Demi Lovato
- Jonas Brothers
- David Archuleta
- Jason Derulo
- Justin Bieber
- Mitchel Musso
