= KDZA (AM) =

Radio station in Pueblo, Colorado

- Pueblo, Colorado; United States
- Frequency: 1230 kHz
- Branding: 101.9 and 107.3 KDZA

Programming
- Format: Classic hits

Ownership
- Owner: Marcos A. Rodriguez; (Colorado Radio Marketing, LLC)
- Operator: Mountain Radio Group

History
- First air date: December 29, 1947
- Former call signs: KDZA (1948–1993); KKPC (1993–2023)

Technical information
- Licensing authority: FCC
- Facility ID: 53851
- Class: C
- Power: 1,000 watts
- Transmitter coordinates: 38°16′40″N 104°39′16.9″W
- Translator: 101.9 K270CM (Pueblo)
- Repeater: 1530 KQSC (Colorado Springs)

Links
- Public license information: Public file; LMS
- Webcast: Listen live
- Website: kdzaradio.com

KDZA (1230 AM) is a radio station licensed to Pueblo, Colorado, United States. KDZA broadcasts a classic hits format, with studios are West Orman Avenue in Pueblo. KDZA is owned by Marcos A. Rodriguez's Colorado Radio Marketing; under a local marketing agreement, it is operated by Mountain Radio Group, owner of KQSC in Colorado Springs.

The station brands itself as "101.9 and 107.3 KDZA". Programming is also heard on FM translator K270CM at 101.9 MHz in Pueblo and on KQSC (1530 AM and 107.3 FM) in Colorado Springs.

== History ==
The station signed on on December 29, 1947, and from around 1962 until the mid-1980s was Pueblo's leading AM Top 40 outlet.

By 1992, KDZA was a simulcast of rock station KATM-FM; when KATM was sold and became KGFT that August, KDZA began simulcasting the oldies format of KRYT-FM. In late 1992, J. Kent Nichols' Surrey Front Range L.P. sold the station to Pueblo Community College (PCC) for $120,000. KDZA went off the air that December while the sale was pending; in May 1993, it returned as KKPC with business news from the Business Radio Network. KRYT-FM then took on the KDZA-FM call sign. In July 1995, KKPC switched to a sports radio format provided by Prime Sports Radio; that November, it became an all-news station featuring CNN Headline News.

Pueblo Community College agreed to sell KKPC to Monte Spearman's MK Inc. for $270,000 in 2000; the station joined existing Spearman holdings in Colorado that included KFKA in Greeley, KEZZ in Estes Park, and KHPN in Loveland. PCC decided to sell KKPC as it was not cost-effective to operate, and was no longer seen as necessary after entering a partnership with the University of Southern Colorado (USC) that allowed PCC students to work at USC's student-run KTSC-FM. After taking control on April 27, 2001, MK replaced KKPC's commercial news/talk programming with Colorado Public Radio (CPR)'s news and information service at 11 a.m. on May 1; Public Broadcasting of Colorado operated the station under a management agreement ahead of a $275,000 purchase, with MK continuing to operate a local studio on the PCC campus in the interim. CPR's acquisition of KKPC was part of its split into news and classical music networks; its existing Pueblo station, KCFP (91.9 FM), would become a full-time transmitter for the classical service on May 25 after a temporary simulcast with KKPC.

In 2021, Marcos A. Rodriguez, through Colorado Radio Marketing (CRM), acquired KKPC in a swap for KUUR in Carbondale and its four translators. CPR no longer needed KKPC after it began to manage KRCC in 2020; the swap allowed CPR to expand its "Indie 102.3" network to Glenwood Springs and the Colorado Western Slope. On September 23, 2021, KKPC's format was changed to adult hits, branded as "101.9 The Lake" in reflection of its simulcast on FM translator K270CM; the new format was programmed by Mountain Radio Group, owner of KQSC in Colorado Springs, under a local marketing agreement.

On May 18, 2023, a month after returning to its original call sign (which had remained on 107.9 FM until 2018, and was then used on 1350 AM until 2022), KDZA changed its format from adult hits to classic hits, branded as "101.9 KDZA". By the spring of 2024, KDZA had risen to the top of the Pueblo Nielsen Audio ratings, narrowly outrating competing classic hits station KPHT; morning host Nick Donovan had served in the same capacity for KPHT before being laid off from iHeartMedia in March 2023.

On November 11, 2024, KDZA began simulcasting in Colorado Springs on Mountain Radio Group's KQSC (1530 AM and 107.3 FM), rebranding to "101.9 & 107.3 KDZA" and replacing KQSC's red dirt country format. Before the change, Colorado Springs did not have a classic hits or oldies station.
