= KRNX =

- Rye, Colorado; United States
- Broadcast area: Pueblo, Colorado
- Frequency: 104.9 MHz

Programming
- Format: Contemporary worship music
- Network: Air1

Ownership
- Owner: Educational Media Foundation
- Sister stations: KBIQ; KLVG; KWRY

History
- First air date: 2008
- Former call signs: KRYE (2005–2019); KFVR-FM (2019–2020); KWRY (2020–2025); KRNX-FM (2025–2026)

Technical information
- Licensing authority: FCC
- Facility ID: 164276
- Class: C3
- ERP: 25,000 watts
- HAAT: 55 meters (180 ft)
- Transmitter coordinates: 37°56′40″N 104°59′56″W

Links
- Public license information: Public file; LMS
- Webcast: Listen live
- Website: air1.com

KRNX (104.9 FM) is a radio station broadcasting a contemporary worship music format. Licensed to Rye, Colorado, United States, it serves the Pueblo area. The station is owned by Educational Media Foundation (EMF), and carries EMF's Air1 network.

The station signed on in 2008 as regional Mexican station KRYE. In 2020, after going silent and becoming KFVR-FM, it joined Air1 as KWRY. The station became KRNX-FM in 2025.

== History ==
The station went on the air in 2008 as KRYE, a regional Mexican station owned by United States CP, LLC. United States CP reached a deal to sell KRYE, along with KGRE-FM in Estes Park, to Greeley Broadcasting Corporation for $1.175 million in 2019. Greeley, owner of KFVR-FM in Beulah, already operated KRYE and KGRE-FM as "Tigre", sharing the same branding and regional Mexican format as KGRE in Greeley.

By February 2020, the station had changed its call sign to KFVR-FM and gone silent; at that time, United States CP reached a new $150,000 deal to sell the station to the Educational Media Foundation (EMF). Under a network affiliation agreement, the station joined Air1 on March 10, 2020. The station's call sign was changed from KWRY to KRNX-FM on February 13, 2025; the KWRY call sign was concurrently moved to sister station KLCX. The KRNX call sign was shared with EMF's AM radio station in Fountain, which changed its call sign from KJME on February 27. (Note: KRNX AM became KLVG on October 3, 2025, allowing KRNX-FM to drop the suffix on March 30, 2026.)
