= KRYE (FM) =

Radio station in Beulah–Pueblo, Colorado

- Beulah, Colorado; United States
- Broadcast area: Pueblo, Colorado
- Frequency: 94.7 MHz
- Branding: El Tigre

Programming
- Format: Regional Mexican

Ownership
- Owner: Greeley Broadcasting Corporation
- Sister stations: KFCS Colorado Springs, KGRE AM and FM (Greeley)

History
- First air date: 2004 (at 106.5)
- Former call signs: KAUY (1997–1998, CP); KKIK (1998–2001, CP); KFVR-FM (2001–2019)
- Former frequencies: 106.5 MHz (2004–2007)

Technical information
- Licensing authority: FCC
- Facility ID: 81305
- Class: C3
- ERP: 18,000 watts
- HAAT: 118 meters
- Transmitter coordinates: 37°52′40″N 104°57′19″W
- Repeater: 1580 KFCS (Colorado Springs)

Links
- Public license information: Public file; LMS
- Webcast: Listen live
- Website: tigrecolorado.com

KRYE (94.7 MHz) is an FM radio station licensed to Beulah, Colorado, United States. The station is owned by Greeley Broadcasting Corporation.

== History ==
The station was assigned the KAUY call letters on May 16, 1997. On August 21, 1998, the station changed its call sign to KKIK and on October 22, 2001, to KFVR-FM.

On January 19, 2012, KFVR-FM changed its format from regional Mexican to classic rock.

On September 1, 2013, KFVR-FM changed its format from classic rock to oldies.

On November 3, 2014, after KIQN was bought by EMF Broadcasting and ended its country format, KFVR-FM adopted its old format as "KIQ'N Country". The oldies format moved to KWRP 690 AM.

On September 1, 2015, KFVR-FM changed their format to classic hip hop, branded as "The Beat", while its previous "KIQ'N Country" format moved to KJQY 103.3 FM Colorado City.

KRYE-FM later changed to a Regional Mexican format.

The station changed its call sign to KRYE on May 10, 2019.
