= KXTU-LD =

Television station in Colorado Springs, Colorado

- Colorado Springs–Pueblo, Colorado; United States
- City: Colorado Springs, Colorado
- Channels: Digital: 20 (UHF); Virtual: 57
- Branding: SOCO CW

Programming
- Affiliations: 57.1: The CW; 57.2: Rewind TV; 57.3: True Crime Network

Ownership
- Owner: Nexstar Media Group; (Nexstar Media Inc.)
- Sister stations: KXRM-TV

History
- Founded: May 3, 1999
- First air date: November 5, 1999
- Former call signs: K61ER (CP, 1988–1991); K68BY (CP, 1999); K57HR (CP, 1999); KXTU-LP (1999–2010)
- Former channel numbers: Analog: 57 (UHF, 1999–2010)
- Former affiliations: UPN (1999–2006)
- Call sign meaning: KXRM (sister station), "TU" (2) may refer to this sister station status

Technical information
- Licensing authority: FCC
- Facility ID: 22681
- Class: LD
- ERP: 2.9 kW
- HAAT: 649 m (2,129 ft)
- Transmitter coordinates: 38°44′42.9″N 104°51′41.9″W
- Translator(s): KXRM-TV 21.2 Colorado Springs

Links
- Public license information: LMS
- Website: www.fox21news.com/soco-cw/

KXTU-LD (channel 57) is a low-power television station in Colorado Springs, Colorado, United States, serving as the CW outlet for Southern Colorado. It is owned and operated by network majority owner Nexstar Media Group alongside Fox affiliate KXRM-TV (channel 21). The two stations share studios on Wooten Road in Colorado Springs; KXTU-LD's transmitter is located on Cheyenne Mountain.

The station is simulcast in high definition on KXRM-TV's second digital subchannel. This signal increases KXTU's broadcasting radius; KXTU did not convert to digital until 2010, and even in digital, its coverage area is effectively limited to El Paso and Pueblo counties.

== History ==
The station signed on as KXTU-LP on November 5, 1999, as a UPN affiliate under the brand of "UPN57". For the first 4 years, UPN programming was available via Denver's KTVD.

When UPN left the air on September 17, 2006, KXTU switched to The CW, which was created by the merger of The WB (which had been available in the market by way of Denver's KWGN-TV) and UPN.

Unlike most other low-power stations, KXTU is available to viewers on DirecTV and Dish Network, as well as on cable systems throughout southern Colorado. This is because under the retransmission consent portion of the must-carry rules, KXRM has the right to require cable and satellite providers to carry KXTU as part of the compensation for carrying KXRM.

On August 30, 2010, KXTU-LP flash-cut from analog to digital on channel 57. On October 27, 2010, it changed its call sign to KXTU-LD.

In early 2012, the station moved from channel 57 to channel 20 and rebranded from "CW 57" to "SOCO CW".

On February 28, 2013, Barrington Broadcasting announced the sale of its entire group, including KXTU-LD, to Sinclair Broadcast Group. The sale was completed on November 25.

On August 20, 2014, Sinclair announced that it would sell KXRM-TV and KXTU-LD, along with WTTA in Tampa Bay and WHTM in Harrisburg, to Media General in a swap for WJAR in Providence, Rhode Island, WLUK-TV and WCWF in Green Bay, Wisconsin, and WTGS in Savannah, Georgia. The swap is part of Media General's merger with LIN Media. WHTM's sale of Media General was explored nearly two months earlier, and it was completed, nearly three months before the Media General/LIN deal was completed. The sale was completed on December 19. A condition of the sale maintained the station's affiliation with Sinclair's American Sports Network package of college sports.

== Local programming ==
Unlike its sister station, KXTU does not air newscasts, but during a breaking news event or weather bump, it simulcasts KXRM's coverage. Since 2023, KXTU has served as the local television home for Colorado College Tigers men's ice hockey.

== Subchannels ==
The station's signal is multiplexed:

Subchannels of KXTU-LD
Subchannel	Res.	Short name	Programming
57.1	1080i	KXTU-LD	The CW
57.2	480i	Rewind	Rewind TV
57.3	480i	Laff	True Crime Network
