= KCRN (AM) =

- Limon, Colorado; United States
- Broadcast area: Denver metropolitan area; Colorado Springs metropolitan area
- Frequency: 1120 kHz

Programming
- Format: Catholic radio
- Affiliations: EWTN Radio

Ownership
- Owner: Catholic Radio Network, Inc.
- Sister stations: KFEL; KRCN

History
- First air date: May 8, 1984; 42 years ago
- Former call signs: KLIM (1984–2018)
- Call sign meaning: "Catholic Radio Network"

Technical information
- Licensing authority: FCC
- Facility ID: 25185
- Class: D
- Power: 50,000 watts (day)
- Transmitter coordinates: 39°16′28″N 104°9′43.9″W
- Translators: 98.1 K251CV (Golden); 104.3 K282CH (Colorado Springs)

Links
- Public license information: Public file; LMS

KCRN (1120 kHz) is an AM radio station licensed to Limon, Colorado, and serving East Central Colorado. The station is owned by Catholic Radio Network, Inc. It airs a catholic radio format, mostly carrying talk and teaching programs from the EWTN Radio Network. Programming is simulcast on KRCN in Longmont, Colorado, serving the Denver metropolitan area.

By day, KCRN broadcasts at 50,000 watts, the maximum power for most AM radio stations in the U.S. The high power and directional antenna allow KCRN to be heard in Denver and Colorado Springs. Because AM 1120 is a clear channel frequency reserved for Class A KMOX in St. Louis, KCRN must leave the air at night when radio signals travel farther.

The transmitter is on Route 86 in Simla, about 25 miles west of Limon. KCRN is also heard on 230-watt FM translator station K282CH at 104.3 MHz in Colorado Springs, Colorado.

== History ==
The station signed on the air on May 4, 1984. Because it was in Limon, Colorado, the owners chose the call sign KLIM. It was owned by the Robad Broadcasting Company, airing a country music format, with news from AP Radio. For its first three decades, it was powered at just 250 watts, heard only in Limon and adjacent communities.

The station had financial problems in the 1990s. Roger L. Hoppe II was named the receiver in 1996, buying KLIM for only $8,000. In the early 2000s, the station was dark for some time.

On April 13, 2016, KLIM was granted a Federal Communications Commission construction permit to move to a new transmitter site, increase the daytime power to 50,000 watts and add critical hours service with 3,000 watts. The day and critical hours transmitter sites would be different. On March 10, 2017, an application was filed to modify the construction permit. The 50 kW transmitter site was changed and there would be no critical hours service.

The application was accepted for filing on March 24, 2017.

KLIM was acquired by the Catholic Radio Network in 2018, changing the call sign to KCRN to match the organization's initials. The new 50,000-watt transmitter went on the air, with an FM translator at 104.3 in Colorado Springs, giving KCRN coverage in the growing radio market. In 2025, a translator on 98.1 in Golden, switched its programming over to carry KCRN, giving the station an FM signal in Denver. Both translators are allowed to operate 24 hours a day, while the AM must sign off at sunset.
