= KFVR (AM) =

Radio station in Crescent City, California (1959–2017)

- Crescent City, California; United States
- Frequency: 1310 kHz

Ownership
- Owner: Del Rosario Talpa, Inc.

History
- First air date: 1959
- Last air date: May 17, 2017 (date of license cancellation)
- Former call signs: KPOD (1959–1975); KPLY (1975–1979); KCRE (1979–1981, 1982–1991); KDNC (1981–1982)

Technical information
- Facility ID: 52107
- Class: D
- Power: 1,000 watts (days only)
- Transmitter coordinates: 41°45′35″N 124°9′49″W

KFVR (1310 AM) was a radio station broadcasting a Regional Mexican format. Licensed to Crescent City, California, United States, the station was owned by Del Rosario Talpa, Inc.

== History ==
KFVR was born in 1959 under the call letters KCRE standing for the first three letters in Crescent City, California. In the 1960s it was bought by Mason Deaver. He sold it to Ber-Tec Broadcasting, Inc. in 1979. The two owners of Ber-Tec Broadcasting Inc. were Bob Berkowitz and David Tecker. They decided to change the call letters to KDNC which they wanted to represent Del Norte County. After less than a year, the station's call letters were changed back to the original ones it had in the 1950s, KCRE. In 1990, Ber-Tec Broadcasting sold the station to Larry Goodman. In 1998, he sold it to Pollack-Belz Broadcasting. On October 1, 1991, the call letters were changed to KFVR.

KFVR's license was canceled on May 17, 2017, due to failure to pay debts it owed to the Federal Communications Commission (FCC).
