= South-Central Colorado =

- Location within Colorado
- Coordinates: 38°0′N 104°40′W
- Country: United States
- State: Colorado

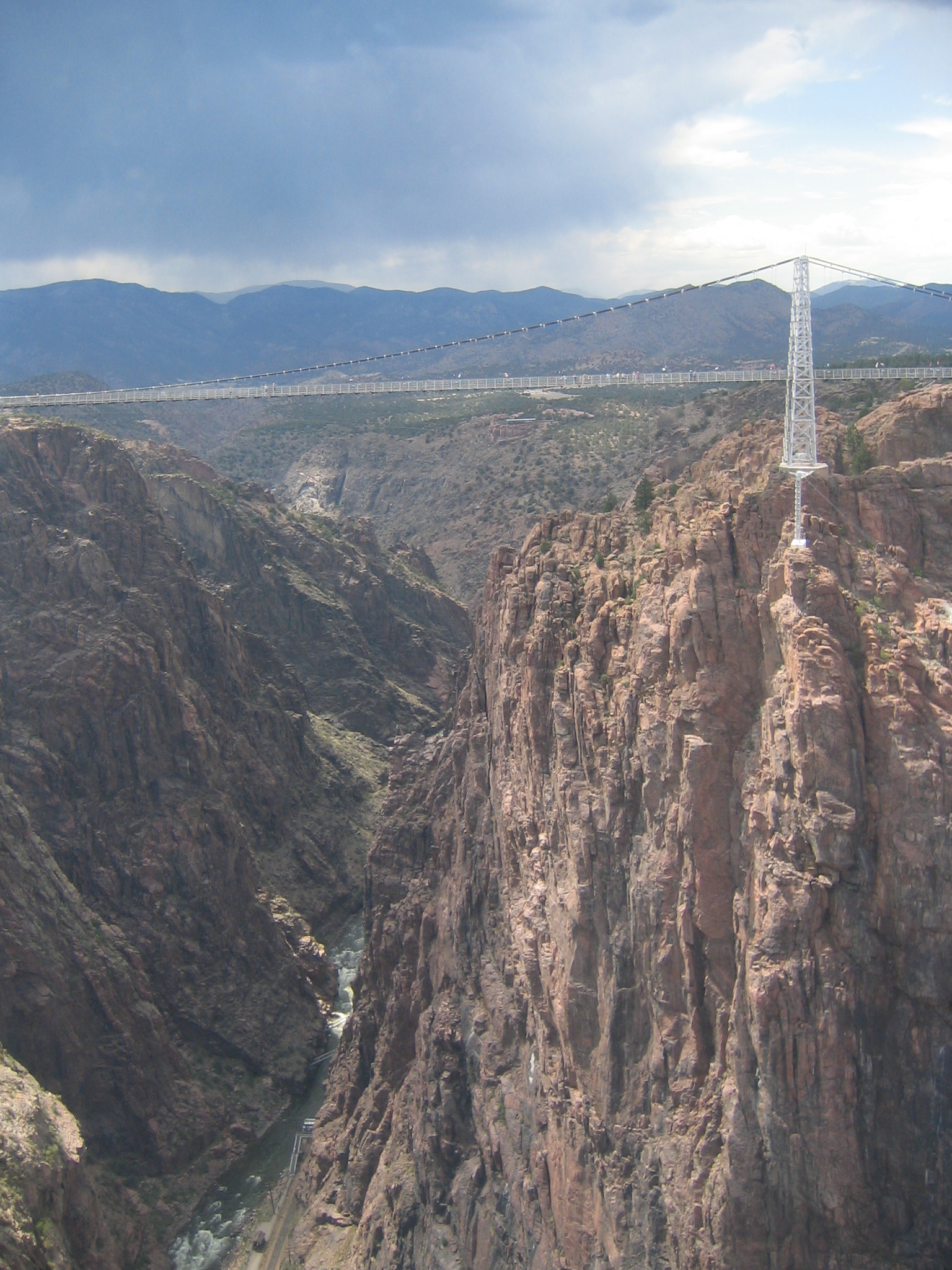
The Royal Gorge (seen here with the canyon bridge) is one of the scenic attractions in South-Central Colorado

South-Central Colorado is a region of the U.S. state of Colorado. It can be roughly defined by Chaffee County in the northwest, El Paso County in the northeast, Las Animas County in the southeast, and Conejos County in the southwest. Some notable towns and cities there include Colorado Springs, Pueblo, Cripple Creek, Cañon City, Salida, Buena Vista, Monte Vista, Alamosa, Walsenburg, and Trinidad. The landscapes of South-Central Colorado were made known to the Western world by the explorations of Zebulon Pike and Kit Carson, who were later followed by settlers, many of whom came by the Santa Fe Trail. The upper tributaries of the Arkansas River and South Platte River provide ample whitewater rafting and are famous for trout and bass fishing in scenic settings such as Royal Gorge. Much of the local economic system is dependent on mining, forestry, ranching, and tourism related to these endeavors. South-Central Colorado has largely escaped urbanization, allowing visitors to experience something of the American Old West.

== Counties ==
- Alamosa County
- Chaffee County
- Conejos County
- Costilla County
- Custer County
- El Paso County
- Fremont County
- Huerfano County
- Las Animas County
- Park County
- Pueblo County
- Rio Grande County
- Saguache County
- Teller County

== Education ==
As the home of two of Colorado's large metropolitan areas (Colorado Springs and Pueblo), South-Central Colorado is also home to several institutions of higher education:

=== Community/technical colleges ===
- IntelliTec College (Colorado Springs, Pueblo)
- Pikes Peak State College (Colorado Springs)
- Pueblo Community College (Pueblo, Cañon City)
- Trinidad State College (Trinidad)

=== Four-year colleges/universities ===
- Adams State University (Alamosa)
- Colorado College (Colorado Springs)
- Colorado State University-Pueblo (Pueblo)
- Colorado Technical University (Colorado Springs)
- United States Air Force Academy (USAF Academy)
- University of Colorado-Colorado Springs (Colorado Springs)

== See also ==
- Geography of Colorado
