= KILO =

Radio station in Colorado Springs, Colorado

Coordinates: 38.746°N 104.862°W

- Colorado Springs, Colorado; United States
- Broadcast area: Colorado Springs and Pueblo
- Frequency: 94.3 MHz
- Branding: 94.3 KILO

Programming
- Format: Active rock

Ownership
- Owner: Bahakel Communications; (Colorado Springs Radio Broadcasters Inc.)
- Sister stations: KRXP

History
- First air date: August 22, 1962
- Former call signs: KLST (1962–1966); KPIK-FM (1966–1978)
- Former frequencies: 94.3 MHz (1962–1977); 93.9 MHz (1977–1994)
- Call sign meaning: KILO (metric system)

Technical information
- Licensing authority: FCC
- Facility ID: 12367
- Class: C
- ERP: 79,000 watts
- HAAT: 670 meters (2,200 ft)

Links
- Public license information: Public file; LMS
- Webcast: Listen live
- Website: www.kilo943.com

KILO (94.3 FM) is a radio station broadcasting in Colorado Springs and Pueblo, Colorado, United States. It also streams online. The station is owned by Bahakel Communications and broadcasts an active rock format.

== History ==
=== KLST and KPIK-FM ===
The 94.3 signal signed on the air on August 22, 1962, as KLST, owned by Little London Broadcasting. Douglas W. Dailey served as the station's first president and general manager. The studios were located at 802 1/2 E. Fillmore Avenue in Colorado Springs, Colorado. The station was sold to the Western Broadcasting Company, owners of KPIK (1580 AM), in 1966 and became KPIK-FM. The FM station simulcast KPIK, making it just the second all-country music station on FM in the United States. The AM and FM stations remained a simulcast through 1977, when the FM moved toward a more contemporary country sound as "Super K-94" (coinciding with a move to 93.9 MHz, where it was located from 1977 to 1994) while the AM station focused on more traditional country. That same year, station manager George James was elected to the Colorado Springs city council.

In 1978, George James bought KPIK, while the FM was sold separately to the KILO Broadcasting Corporation. The month before, it had adopted a metric system-themed moniker, KILO. As KILO, the station adopted an album-oriented rock format.

KILO Broadcasting was owned by local businessmen Robert "Bob" D. Telmosse and Charlie Brown. Telmosse and Brown would later sell KILO Radio to Bahakel Communications in 1984. Both Telmosse and Brown would continue to reside in Colorado Springs and explore other business interests. Telmosse was best known as the owner of a local furniture store called The Denver Warehouse, and starting an annual local Christmas giveaway in the early 1980s which began as a hoax, but Telmosse stepped up to the challenge. Telmosse would pass away in 2003, but his namesake foundation is still in operation. Charlie Brown would later operate a local travel agency.

=== Active rock ===
By 1991 KILO had moved to an active rock format. The station is known for playing new bands well before many other stations will add them to their playlist and is usually one of the higher rated stations in Colorado Springs. Rich Hawk, who programmed the station for 27 years, was widely considered one of the "fathers of active rock". On March 7, 2013, Rich Hawk died after falling into a coma in February.

== Additional information ==
The Pure Rock Panel is a fan club of sorts. It is used to inform its members of concerts and new releases, and to get feedback about the station.

During the winter months, the station used to organize ski trips to the nearby Monarch Ski Area. These trips started in 1978 and ended in 2016.
