= KUBE (AM) =

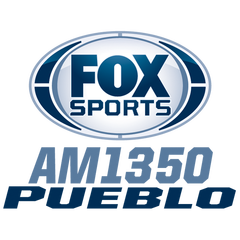

Pueblo, Colorado; United States
- Broadcast area: Pueblo/Colorado Springs
- Frequency: 1350 kHz (HD Radio)
- Branding: Fox Sports 1350

Programming
- Format: Sports
- Affiliations: Fox Sports Radio

Ownership
- Owner: iHeartMedia, Inc.; (iHM Licenses, LLC)
- Sister stations: KBPL; KCCY-FM; KCSJ; KIBT; KKLI; KPHT; KVUU

History
- First air date: January 1928; 97 years ago
- Former call signs: KGHF (1928–1964); KKAM (1964–1976); KIDN (1976–1988); KRYT (1988–1989); KGHF (1989–2008); KDZA (2008–2012); KCCY (2012–2018); KBPL (2018); KDZA (2018–2022)
- Call sign meaning: Warehoused callsign from 93.3 in Seattle

Technical information
- Licensing authority: FCC
- Facility ID: 53850
- Class: B
- Power: 1,300 watts day; 150 watts night
- Transmitter coordinates: 38°21′28″N 104°38′19″W

Links
- Public license information: Public file; LMS
- Webcast: Listen live (via iHeartRadio)
- Website: foxsportspueblo.iheart.com

KUBE (1350 kHz) is an AM radio station broadcasting a sports format. Licensed to Pueblo, Colorado, United States, it serves the Colorado Springs area. The station is currently owned by iHeartMedia, Inc. and licensed as CC Licenses.

== History ==
This station was authorized to Philip C. Lasky and J. H. Albert on October 27, 1927, as KGHF. It originally broadcast on 1430 kHz, sharing the frequency with KFXJ. It went on the air in January 1928 from the Congress Hotel.

In 1964, KGHF became KKAM. KKAM challenged market-leading KDZA (1230 AM) in the early 1970s with a top 40 format. The station would eventually become country KIDN and later return to its KGHF callsign.

KDZA was shut down in the early 1990s and was sold to Pueblo Community College a few years later, which renamed that station KKPC. KKPC was later sold to Colorado Public Radio. The KDZA call sign was picked up for a Pueblo-based FM oldies station at 107.9 and the station remained a success. When KDZA-FM adopted the Jet 107.9 moniker along with a move towards 1970s-based hits along with a focus on the Colorado Springs area, Clear Channel Communications (forerunner to iHeartMedia) decided to revive the KDZA call sign on the signal of its former competitor, AM 1350, by dropping the sports talk format on AM 1350. In late July 2009, the station went back to the sports format. On April 3, 2012, KDZA changed its callsign to KCCY. On April 13, 2012, KCCY changed formats from sports to classic country.

On May 22, 2013, KCCY changed formats back to sports, branded as "Fox Sports 1350". The station changed its call sign to KBPL on January 16, 2018, and back to KDZA on January 23, 2018.

On May 12, 2022, KDZA changed callsigns to KUBE as part of a warehousing move of the call letters that were formerly carried on a sister station in Seattle, Washington.
