= KFEL =

Radio station in Pueblo, Colorado

- Pueblo, Colorado; United States
- Broadcast area: Colorado Springs, Colorado and Pueblo, Colorado
- Frequency: 970 kHz

Programming
- Format: EWTN Radio/Catholic Radio Network
- Affiliations: EWTN Radio/Catholic Radio Network

Ownership
- Owner: Kansas City Catholic Network, Inc.
- Sister stations: KCRN, KRCN

History
- First air date: September 1956
- Call sign meaning: Heritage call sign of the current-day KKSE

Technical information
- Licensing authority: FCC
- Facility ID: 23151
- Class: D
- Power: 3,200 Watts day 185 watts night
- Transmitter coordinates: 38°15′57″N 104°40′44″W

Links
- Public license information: Public file; LMS

KFEL (970 AM) is a radio station broadcasting a Catholic radio format. Licensed to Pueblo, Colorado, United States, it serves the Colorado Springs and Pueblo areas. The station is currently owned by Kansas City Catholic Network, Inc.
