= KPHT =

Coordinates: 37.902°N 104.267°W

- Rocky Ford, Colorado; United States
- Broadcast area: Pueblo, Colorado
- Frequency: 95.5 MHz (HD Radio)
- Branding: 95.5 KPHT

Programming
- Format: Classic hits
- Affiliations: Premiere Networks

Ownership
- Owner: iHeartMedia, Inc.; (iHM Licenses, LLC)
- Sister stations: KBPL, KCCY-FM, KCSJ, KIBT, KKLI, KUBE, KVUU

History
- First air date: May 1966 (as KAVI-FM)
- Former call signs: KAVI-FM (1966–1999); KOOO (1999–2002); KJQY (2002–2005)
- Former frequencies: 95.9 MHz (1966–1989)
- Call sign meaning: Pueblo Hot, for previous format

Technical information
- Licensing authority: FCC
- Facility ID: 87658
- Class: C1
- ERP: 100,000 watts
- HAAT: 224 meters

Links
- Public license information: Public file; LMS
- Webcast: Listen Live; HD2: Listen Live
- Website: kpht955.iheart.com

KPHT (95.5 FM, "95.5 KPHT") is a radio station broadcasting a classic hits format. Licensed to Rocky Ford, Colorado, it serves the Pueblo, Colorado area. The signal can be heard in most parts of Colorado Springs. The station is currently owned by iHeartMedia, Inc.

== History ==
KPHT was originally KAVI-FM and was assigned to Rocky Ford as a class A operating on 95.9, but was granted a C1 upgrade by moving frequency to 95.5 in 1989.

In 2004 the station was changed to "Hot 95-5" as a rhythmic adult contemporary format similar to KPLV in Las Vegas. During this time, KPHT aired the Wake Up With Whoopi morning show hosted by Whoopi Goldberg.

In 2009 KPHT flipped to its current format of classic hits when the format was dropped at sister station 107.9 FM.

== Signal coverage ==
KPHT's tower is located 60 miles south of Colorado Springs and even being a C1 with ERP of 100 kW the signal is spotty in most of the Springs. KPTT 95.7 FM in Denver also hampers the signal; this is the reason why the tower is more south of Colorado Springs and only covers most of Pueblo.
