= KIXD =

Radio station in Pueblo, Colorado

Coordinates: 38°18′56″N 104°37′03″W

- Pueblo, Colorado; United States
- Frequency: 1480 kHz
- Branding: Kix Country 107.5

Programming
- Format: Country

Ownership
- Owner: Dave Moore; (Kix Broadcasting, LLC)

History
- First air date: 1960
- Former call signs: KTUX (1960–1963); KPUB (1963–1982); KGMQ (1982–1983); KAYK (1983–1988); KRRU (1988–1998); KAVA (1998–2023)

Technical information
- Licensing authority: FCC
- Facility ID: 54259
- Class: D
- Power: 1,000 watts day; 107 watts night
- Translator: 107.5 K298CG (Pueblo)

Links
- Public license information: Public file; LMS
- Website: mykix1075.com

KIXD (1480 AM) is a radio station broadcasting a country music format. Licensed to Pueblo, Colorado, United States, it serves the Pueblo area.

== History ==
1480 kHz in Pueblo went on the air in 1960 as KTUX. It was owned by the Steel City Broadcasting Company and broadcast as a daytime-only station. Steel City declared bankruptcy in 1962, and KTUX fell silent on October 24 of that year. When Donald W. Reynolds, Jr., bought the station in 1963 and returned it to the air, he renamed it KPUB and aired a country format.

Quixote Broadcasting, KPUB's owner, was sold to L.W. Newcomb, Rex R. Miller and Clifton H. Gardiner in 1969. In 1975, KPUB spawned an FM station, KPUB-FM 99.9, which was a simulcast of KPUB and continued its programming after sunset. The trio sold the station in 1978 to the Rocky Mountain Broadcasting Company of Colorado, owned by Leo Smentowski and William J. Engler; the FM station was sold separately. In 1981, Smentowski bought out Engler's interest.

The Gunter Corporation bought KPUB in 1982 and renamed it KGMQ, the first of nine license assignments for the frequency in a 14-year span. Gunter sold the station to Erway Communications in 1983, at which point the new owners renamed the station KAYK; Erway sold it to the Colorado Community Wireless Radio Company, which declared bankruptcy in 1988; Yonker and Turner Broadcasting acquired the station out of bankruptcy and renamed it KRRU; Yonker and Turner itself went into bankruptcy, and Joyce Erway acquired the station again, only to sell to Quetzal Communications Corporation within four months; and Quetzal sold KRRU to Polarcomm in 1996. Polarcomm changed the call letters to KAVA on September 18, 1998. Successive owners, including Council Tree Communications and Latino Communications, have maintained Spanish-language formats.

KAVA formerly was a simulcast with KXRE in the Colorado Springs area, but sold that that station to Colorado Public Radio, and now is owned by Pikes Peak Community College. Both stations once simulcast Denver's KBNO.

On October 1, 2022, KAVA began operations under a Time Brokerage Agreement with Kix Broadcasting. Latino Communications was selling the station and its translator K298CG to Kix, led by longtime southern Colorado announcer Dave Moore, for $159,000. Kix had filed a request to change the station's callsign to KIXD.

On October 20, 2022, KAVA changed its format from Regional Mexican to country, branded as "Kix Country 107.5". The sale to Kix Broadcasting was consummated on January 6, 2023 and the call sign change to KIXD took place on February 16, 2023.
