= KGFT =

Coordinates: 38.745°N 104.861°W

Pueblo, Colorado; United States
- Broadcast area: Colorado Springs metropolitan area
- Frequency: 100.7 MHz
- Branding: The Word FM 100.7

Programming
- Language: English
- Format: Christian radio
- Affiliations: SRN News

Ownership
- Owner: Salem Media Group; (Bison Media, Inc.)
- Sister stations: KZNT

History
- First air date: March 8, 1976
- Former call signs: KZLO (1977–1986); KATM (1986–1992)
- Call sign meaning: The Gift (previous branding)

Technical information
- Licensing authority: FCC
- Facility ID: 20579
- Class: C
- ERP: 77,000 watts
- HAAT: 676 meters (2,218 ft)

Links
- Public license information: Public file; LMS
- Webcast: Listen live Listen live (via iHeartRadio)
- Website: thewordfm1007.com

KGFT (100.7 FM) is a commercial radio station licensed to Pueblo, Colorado, United States, and serving the Colorado Springs-Pueblo area. Owned by the Salem Media Group, the station features a Christian radio format branded as "The Word FM 100.7". The studios are on Campus Drive off Interstate 25 in Colorado Springs.

The antenna is on Transmitter Lane amid the towers for other local FM and TV stations.

== History ==
The station signed on the air on March 8, 1976. The original call sign was KZLO, the sister station to KDZA (1230 AM). KZLO had an easy listening format and it served the Pueblo radio market. The station later switched to a CHR/Top 40 format calling itself "Z100."

It changed its call sign to KATM and its on-air moniker to "The Kat". It made its move into the Colorado Springs market in 1988, originally as a mainstream Top 40 station. But due to competition from then top-rated CHR KIKX, as well as KKMG which also moved into the Colorado Springs market with a similar Top 40 sound, KATM adjusted its playlist. It became Colorado Springs and Pueblo's local "Rock 40" station, playing only the top hits that had a rock beat. By 1991, KATM evolved into an album rock station, lasting for only a year.

In 1992, KATM was sold to Salem Communications for $950,000. The call letters became KGFT, representing the station's moniker, "The Gift." It switched to Christian talk and teaching programs. The call sign KATM was later picked up by a country music station in the Modesto/Stockton market. The KZLO call letters were picked up by the Educational Media Foundation for a "K-Love" station in Kilgore, Texas.
