= KBPL =

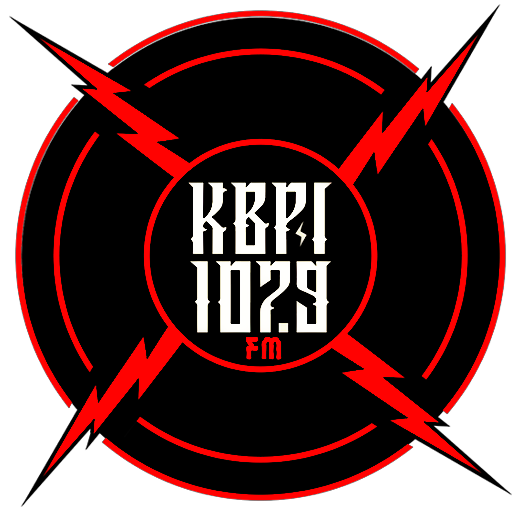
- Pueblo, Colorado; United States
- Broadcast area: Colorado Springs-Pueblo
- Frequency: 107.9 MHz (HD Radio)
- Branding: 107.9 KBPI South

Programming
- Format: Active rock
- Subchannels: HD2: iHeartRadio Countdown

Ownership
- Owner: iHeartMedia; (iHM Licenses, LLC)
- Sister stations: KCCY-FM, KCSJ, KIBT, KKLI, KPHT, KUBE, KVUU

History
- First air date: March 3, 1987; 39 years ago (as KRYT)
- Former call signs: KRYT (1986–1988); KRYT-FM (1988–1993); KDZA-FM (1993–2018)
- Call sign meaning: Disambiguation of KBPI

Technical information
- Licensing authority: FCC
- Facility ID: 40848
- Class: C0
- ERP: 32,000 watts
- HAAT: 674 meters (2,211 ft)
- Transmitter coordinates: 38°44′41″N 104°51′46″W

Links
- Public license information: Public file; LMS
- Webcast: Listen Live; Listen Live (HD2)
- Website: 1079kbpi.iheart.com iheartradiocountdown.com (HD2)

KBPL (107.9 FM, "107.9 KBPI South") is a radio station licensed to Pueblo, Colorado, and serving the Colorado Springs–Pueblo radio market. Owned by iHeartMedia, it broadcasts an active rock format. The transmitter is located on Cheyenne Mountain amid other TV and FM towers for stations in the Colorado Springs-Pueblo market.

== History ==
The station first signed on as KRYT on March 3, 1987. It was the FM counterpart to AM 1350 KGHF (now KUBE). The call sign reflected the station nickname "K-Right", as 107.9 is at the far right end of the FM dial. On December 1, 1988, the station changed its call sign to KRYT-FM.

On January 1, 1993, the station was bought by the McCoy Broadcasting Company. It became KDZA-FM. The KDZA call letters had previously been on AM 1230 which had been sold to Pueblo Community College. KDZA-FM had an oldies format. On June 24, 2008, it switched to classic hits, calling itself Jet 107.9.

In 2000, it was sold to Clear Channel Communications, the forerunner of today's iHeartMedia. On July 13, 2009, Clear Channel flipped KDZA-FM to album rock and moved the studios and offices to Colorado Springs. KDZA-FM switched to classic rock as Z107.9 on November 30, 2011. A few years later, KDZA-FM got a boost in its coverage area when it was allowed to relocate its tower to Cheyenne Mountain. The height above average terrain (HAAT) increased from 230 to 2,211 feet (70 to 674 meters).

On December 11, 2017, KDZA-FM flipped to active rock as a repeater of KBPI in Fort Collins, and joined as part of a trimulcast with KPAW in Fort Collins and K300CP in Denver. KDZA-FM changed its call sign to KBPL on January 23, 2018.

On January 28, 2019, KBPL broke away from the trimulcast and began to operate autonomously from KBPI, carrying a separate playlist and adding local hosts during the afternoon and nighttime dayparts (while otherwise continuing to share hosts with KBPI). The station is being referred to on iHeartMedia's digital platforms as "KBPI South".
