= KSTY =

Radio station in Canon City, Colorado

- Canon City, Colorado; United States
- Broadcast area: Colorado Springs-Pueblo, Colorado
- Frequency: 104.5 MHz
- Branding: Star Country 104.5

Programming
- Format: Country
- Affiliations: Denver Broncos Radio Network

Ownership
- Owner: Frontier Frequencies LLC

History
- First air date: June 1, 1975
- Former call signs: KRLN-FM (1974–1976, 1982–1994); KSTX (1976–1982); KKCS-FM (2005–2007)
- Former frequencies: 103.9 MHz (1975–1999)
- Call sign meaning: "Star Country"

Technical information
- Licensing authority: FCC
- Facility ID: 35551
- Class: C3
- ERP: 8,600 watts
- HAAT: 14 meters (46 ft)
- Transmitter coordinates: 38°18′54″N 105°12′40″W

Links
- Public license information: Public file; LMS

KSTY (104.5 FM) is a country music formatted radio station licensed to Canon City, Colorado, United States. The station is owned by Frontier Frequencies LLC. The signal was formerly rebroadcast by KSTY-FM1, a 3-watt booster station also on 104.5, serving the Colorado Springs area.

== History ==
KSTY went on the air on June 1, 1975, as KRLN-FM on 103.9 MHz, changing to KSTX on August 30, 1976. It was the FM sister to KRLN, and initially simulcast the AM station. KRLN-FM broadcast with 3,000 watts from a transmitter site in Canon City. On May 31, 1982, KSTX reverted to the KRLN-FM call letters.

By 1991, when the station added programming from Unistar, KRLN-FM was a country music station. It became KSTY on December 30, 1994.

The station remained on 103.9 MHz until 1999, when it swapped frequencies with KYZX in Pueblo and moved to 104.5. Later that year, Warner Enterprises sold its stations — KSTY and KRLN, along with stations in Lincoln, Nebraska — to James Haber's JC Acquisition for $11.465 million, in conjunction with the sale of the Lincoln stations to Triad Broadcasting. The Warner family's Royal Gorge Broadcasting bought back KSTY and KRLN for $715,000 in 2000.

On December 8, 2005, KSTY took on the programming and call sign of KKCS-FM 101.9. The move was undone in 2007, and the KSTY call letters and "Star Country" moniker returned to the 104.5 frequency.

On December 23, 2024, Royal Gorge Broadcasting announced that it would close KSTY and KRLN effective January 1, 2025. The stations were the last to be owned by the Warner family, whose station group had included stations in Colorado, Kansas, and Nebraska.

In April 2025 the KSTY license was purchased by Meg Stanley, the station's former manager, through her company Frontier Frequencies. On August 1, 2025, the new owners returned KSTY to the air, again as "Star Country".
