= KWRY (FM) =

K-Love radio station in Pueblo, Colorado

- Pueblo, Colorado; United States
- Broadcast area: Pueblo, Colorado
- Frequency: 106.9 MHz

Programming
- Format: Contemporary worship music
- Network: Air1

Ownership
- Owner: Educational Media Foundation
- Sister stations: KBIQ; KLVG; KRNX

History
- First air date: October 30, 1979
- Former call signs: KAPI-FM (1979–1981); KRMX-FM (1981–1985); KUSN (1985–1988); KCSJ-FM (1988–1989); KGRQ-FM (1989–1993); KNKN (1993–2009); KIQN (2009–2014); KLCX (2014–2025)
- Former frequencies: 107.1 MHz (1979–2005)

Technical information
- Licensing authority: FCC
- Facility ID: 25526
- Class: C1
- ERP: 100,000 watts
- HAAT: 73 meters (240 ft)
- Transmitter coordinates: 37°56′40″N 104°59′56″W

Links
- Public license information: Public file; LMS
- Webcast: Listen live
- Website: www.air1.com

KWRY (106.9 MHz) is an FM radio station licensed to Pueblo, Colorado, United States. The station is owned by the Educational Media Foundation and is part of its Air1 network, broadcasting contemporary worship music. The station began broadcasting in 1979 as KAPI-FM and was a Spanish-language station from 1979 to 1985 and 1994 to 2009. After several years airing a country music format as KIQN, the Educational Media Foundation acquired the facility in 2014.

== History ==
This station began broadcasting on October 30, 1979, as KAPI-FM 107.1, the sister station to KAPI (690 AM). It brought nighttime Spanish-language radio programming to Pueblo for the first time. In 1981, the KAPI stations changed their call signs to KRMX AM and FM. The KRMX stations—owned by the Denver-based KAPI Inc, a group including KDVR founder George Sandoval—were bought by manager Andrés Neidig in 1984

In April 1985, KRMX-FM split from its AM station to adopt an English-language program schedule. Known as Super X FM 107, the station had country music in the mornings and evenings, easy listening at midday, and an afternoon drive slot run by high school students. That September, the station was acquired by Sunbrook Broadcasting, owner of KCSJ, and became a full-time country station as KUSN "US 107". Sunbrook, which had previously filed to build an FM station and withdrew as part of a settlement, elected to program country over contemporary music because there were only two other country stations in Pueblo.

KCSJ and KUSN were sold in 1987 to Sunbrook Communications, a sister company, as part of a long-term plan to take the firm public. After the flip, KUSN became KCSJ-FM in 1988. The relaunched station rated near the bottom of the market and changed call signs in 1989 to KGRQ-FM. By 1990, when Sunbrook reacquired the stations from Rainbow Communications of Pueblo, it was a contemporary hit radio station.

In 1992, the station, then airing a classic rock format and known as Q107, was in discussions to be acquired by the owner of KCCY-FM, the market-leading country station. Instead, it was sold to Pueblo Broadcasters, owned by Marc O. Hand, and the call sign was changed to KNKN. In September 1994, under the ownership of Cincinnati-based Guardian Communications, the station flipped from country to a Tejano music format. At the time, Tejano was rapidly growing nationwide.

Guardian, owned by Carl Lindner, moved in 1996 to auction its nine remaining radio stations, which included KNKN and KFEL in Pueblo. Metropolitan Radio Group of Flower Mound, Texas, acquired the pair in 1997. Having acquired KRMX, Metropolitan agreed to sell the pair to JaneGary Inc. in 2005, by which time KNKN was broadcasting on 106.9 MHz. The sale never occurred, and Metropolitan arranged in 2007 to sell KRMX and KNKN to United States CP LLC.

That deal fell through, and in 2009 the stations were sold to Exodus Broadcasting. The call sign changed to KIQN, and the station aired a country format. United States CP acquired the station in 2011. On November 1, 2013, All Access reported KIQN would be sold by United States CP, LLC to Educational Media Foundation in exchange for Calhan-based KKCS and $400,000 cash. After the swap, the station changed call signs to KLCX and began airing the K-Love network. KLCX's call sign was changed to KWRY on February 13, 2020; the call sign was moved from sister station KRNX-FM.
