= KBIQ =

K-Love radio station in Manitou Springs, Colorado

- Manitou Springs, Colorado; United States
- Broadcast area: Colorado Springs and Pueblo metropolitan areas
- Frequency: 102.7 MHz

Programming
- Language: English
- Format: Christian adult contemporary
- Network: K-Love

Ownership
- Owner: Educational Media Foundation
- Sister stations: KLVG; KRNX; KWRY

History
- First air date: July 1953
- Former call signs: KCMS (1953–1956); KCMS-FM (1956–1974); KIIQ (1974–1984); KIKX (1984–1996)
- Call sign meaning: Bison Media (Salem's subsidiary); Q (former branding)

Technical information
- Licensing authority: FCC
- Facility ID: 73073
- Class: C
- ERP: 72,000 watts
- HAAT: 695 meters (2,280 ft)
- Transmitter coordinates: 38.745°N 104.861°W

Links
- Public license information: Public file; LMS
- Webcast: Listen live
- Website: klove.com

KBIQ (102.7 FM) is a non-commercial, listener-supported radio station licensed to Manitou Springs, Colorado, and serving the Colorado Springs and Pueblo metropolitan areas. It is owned by the Educational Media Foundation (EMF), and it carries EMF's "K-Love" Christian adult contemporary network.

KBIQ has an effective radiated power (ERP) of 72,000 watts. The antenna is on Transmitter Lane in Colorado Springs amid many local FM and TV towers. The signal reaches as far north as Denver and as far south as Walsenburg.

== History ==
=== The 102.7 frequency ===
==== Colorado's Classical Music ====
The current 102.7 license began life at 104.9 MHz in July 1953. Its original call sign was KCMS, "Colorado's Classical Music Station". It was owned by Bud Edmonds, doing business as the Garden of the Gods Broadcasting Company. Edmonds built the facility, the first FM stereo radio station west of the Mississippi River.

Edmonds operated KCMS out of a studio he built in his garage at 68 Minnehaha Avenue. At times, Edmonds and his wife would take turns operating the Seeburg record changer, announcing the music that was being played and changing the albums. In 1956, KCMS moved to 102.7 MHz and gained an AM simulcast partner on 1490 (now KXRE). The FM tower was moved to the top of Cheyenne Mountain.

In early 1970, Edmonds sold KCMS-AM-FM to a group of retired Air Force officers doing business as the Black Forest Development Company. to take the AM station into an "information and education" format, taking the call letters KEDI. The FM became a music station, playing classical during the day, and free-form album rock at night.

==== Top 40 ====
By 1973, the station was a full-time Top 40 music station using the moniker "KEDI-KCMS, Colorado's Music Mother", programmed by Colorado Springs Top 40 radio pioneer Steve Scott. It was the first Top 40 station on FM in Colorado. After several months, its ratings surpassed former Top 40 AM radio legend KYSN.

Never a financial success, KEDI-KCMS was sold in 1974, to Mountain States Broadcasting. Mountain States moved the studios to a location on Manitou Avenue, changing the call letters to KIIQ. It still played Top 40 hits, but with a playlist that was less aggressive. In 1979, Wikes/Abaris Communications acquired KIIQ.

==== Modern rock ====
In the early 1980s, KIIQ broadcast a modern rock format. In 1984, it returned to its roots as a CHR as KIKX (Kicks 102.7), becoming one of the top-rated stations in the market. In 1989, Wikes/Abaris sold KIKX to First Sierra Communications. But after First Sierra went bankrupt in 1990, Wikes/Abaris reacquired KIKX.

In 1988, KIKX got competition from not one but two CHR move-ins from Pueblo. First in the spring KATM (The Kat) came on the air with a similarly programmed station, while later in the fall, KKMG moved in with a Rhythmic-leaning Top 40 sound. KIKX responded with KKMG moving into the market by leaning in a Rhythmic direction but would move back to a Mainstream playlist.

However, KKMG became the dominant CHR in the market and KIKX bowed out of the format. It flipped back to a Modern Rock sound in September 1992, but kept the KIKX call sign and used "The Max" as its moniker. It flipped to a satellite-fed country music format a year later, and in 1995, it switched to an all 1970s format using the "Kicks" moniker.

==== Christian radio ====
In the fall of 1996, Salem Communications brought KIKX. Salem already had a Christian AC station in the market, KKIQ (96.1 FM). That signal was not as strong so Salem moved the format and call sign to 102.7. It has remained Christian AC ever since, although now running the K-Love network.

=== KBIQ ===
==== Word in Music ====
KBIQ signed on in 1993, on 96.1 FM. The station was originally owned by The Word in Music Inc. (known today as Bethesda Christian Broadcasting). The owners were a non-profit organization but the station sold commercial air time since it did not broadcast in the non-commercial FM band between 88.1 and 91.9. The station did several fundraisers asking for money from listeners.

KBIQ was linked to four other stations that were also owned by the same organization, forming a satellite network called TWIM. In 1996, TWIM sold KBIQ to Salem Communications, a large Christian radio owner. The station continued to broadcast on 96.1 until Salem bought KIKX in the fall of the same year. TWIM continued to operate the satellite service until the fall of 1996, when Salem Communications brought "The Word in Music" network. Salem continued to operate the network until 1999. After the network dissolved KBIQ became a locally programmed Christian AC.

Before the KBIQ call sign existed in Colorado Springs, it was the call letters for the contemporary Christian music station in Seattle now known as KCMS. In Seattle, KBIQ was operated by King's Garden Ministries from the 1960s to about 1984. In 1984, King's Garden changed its name to Crista Ministries and KBIQ changed its call sign to KCMS at the same time. The KCMS callsign had originated in Colorado Springs earlier, on what is now KBIQ.

==== Sale to EMF "K-Love" ====
On December 30, 2024, Salem announced that the company would sell its remaining contemporary Christian music stations, including KBIQ. The new owner would be the Educational Media Foundation (EMF), parent company of radio networks K-Love and Air1. EMF already owned K-Love station KLCX (106.9 FM) and Air1 station KJME (780 AM and 96.5 FM) in the area. Salem cited the reason behind the sale was to pay off the company's debt.

A few weeks later, management announced that the station would begin airing K-Love programming beginning at midnight on February 1, 2025. The station now runs the national K-Love feed with only a local station identification each hour.
