= KLVG (AM) =

- Fountain, Colorado; United States
- Broadcast area: Colorado Springs; Pueblo, Colorado
- Frequency: 780 kHz
- Branding: Air1

Programming
- Format: Contemporary worship music
- Network: Air1

Ownership
- Owner: Educational Media Foundation
- Sister stations: KBIQ; KRNX; KWRY

History
- First air date: April 2012
- Former call signs: KCEG (2005–2022); KJME (2022–2025); KRNX (2025)

Technical information
- Licensing authority: FCC
- Facility ID: 135885
- Class: D
- Power: 500 watts day; 15 watts night
- Transmitter coordinates: 38°49′8″N 104°46′33.9″W
- Translator: 96.5 K243AM (Colorado Springs)

Links
- Public license information: Public file; LMS
- Webcast: Listen live
- Website: www.air1.com

KLVG (780 kHz) is an AM radio station airing a contemporary worship music format licensed to Fountain, Colorado, as part of the Air1 network. The station serves the Colorado Springs and Pueblo areas, and is owned by the Educational Media Foundation (EMF).

The station went on the air in 2012 as KCEG, a classic country station. It has been programmed by EMF since 2022, when it joined Air1 as KJME; it became KRNX and then KLVG in 2025.

== History ==
The station first began regular programming in April 2012 as classic country station KCEG, operated as part of Mike Knar's SoCo Radio group. In March 2022, the station, by then KJME, began carrying programming from the Educational Media Foundation (EMF) as the primary station for EMF-owned FM translator K243AM (96.5); the KCEG call sign and classic country format moved to 890 AM, while KJME joined EMF's Air1 network.

EMF agreed to purchase KJME from Timothy Cutforth for $70,000 in March 2023, becoming one of its few AM facilities; the sale was completed in August 2024. The station changed its call sign to KRNX on February 27, 2025; the call sign was shared with Rye sister station KRNX-FM, which had changed from KWRY on February 13. KRNX AM then became KLVG on October 3, 2025.
