= KCSJ =

Pueblo, Colorado; United States
- Broadcast area: Southern Colorado
- Frequency: 590 kHz
- Branding: NewsTalk 590 KCSJ

Programming
- Format: News/talk
- Affiliations: Premiere Networks; Compass Media Networks; Fox News Radio; NBC News Radio

Ownership
- Owner: iHeartMedia, Inc.; (iHM Licenses, LLC)
- Sister stations: KBPL, KCCY-FM, KIBT, KKLI, KPHT, KUBE, KVUU

History
- First air date: August 1947
- Call sign meaning: Chieftain-Star Journal (newspaper, former owner)

Technical information
- Licensing authority: FCC
- Facility ID: 53846
- Class: B
- Power: 1,000 watts
- Transmitter coordinates: 38°21′30″N 104°38′13″W

Links
- Public license information: Public file; LMS
- Webcast: Listen live (via iHeartRadio)
- Website: 590kcsj.iheart.com

KCSJ (590 AM) is a commercial radio station licensed to Pueblo, Colorado, and serving Southern Colorado. The station is owned by iHeartMedia with the license held by iHM Licenses, LLC. It airs a news/talk radio format. The studios and offices are on West 24th Street in Pueblo and the transmitter is off Quartz Street in Pueblo West, Colorado. KCSJ broadcasts with 1,000 watts around the clock, using a directional antenna.

== Programming ==
KCSJ carries mostly nationally syndicated shows from co-owned Premiere Networks: The Glenn Beck Radio Program, The Sean Hannity Show, The Joe Pags Show, The Jesse Kelly Show, Coast to Coast AM with George Noory and This Morning, America's First News with Gordon Deal. From KHOW in Denver, Dan Caplis is heard in afternoon drive time.

Weekends feature shows on money, health, guns, home repair and technology. Syndicated weekend programs include The Kim Komando Show, At Home with Gary Sullivan, The Weekend with Michael Brown, Tom Gresham's Gun Talk, The Ben Ferguson Show and Sunday Night with Bill Cunningham. Most hours begin with an update from iHeart's "24/7 News".

== History ==
The station first signed on the air in August 1947. It has kept the same call sign over its long history. KCSJ was owned by the local daily newspaper, the Chieftain-Star Journal (now The Pueblo Chieftain). The station still carries the call letters which refer to the newspaper. In its early years, it was a network affiliate of the Mutual Broadcasting System. Its studios were on West 5th Street in Pueblo.

Later it was bought by American Media and today is owned by iHeartMedia. Through the 1960s and 1970s, it played middle of the road music (MOR) as well as airing news, farm reports and sports. In the 1980s and 1990s, it moved to a full service adult contemporary format coupled with talk shows and news, transitioning to all talk and news by 2000.

Before its dependence on syndicated programming, KCSJ was once home to Cliff Hendrix and Rich Goodwin (convicted of the contract killing of his business partner Tom Turcotte in 1977).
