= KGRE (AM) =

Regional Mexican radio station in Greeley, Colorado

- Greeley, Colorado; United States
- Broadcast area: Fort Collins, Colorado-Greeley
- Frequency: 1450 kHz
- Branding: El Tigre

Programming
- Format: Regional Mexican

Ownership
- Owner: Greeley Broadcasting Corporation
- Sister stations: KFCS; KRYE

History
- First air date: August 24, 1948
- Former call signs: KYOU (1948–1984); KGRE (1984–1986); KATR (1986–1989)
- Call sign meaning: Greeley

Technical information
- Licensing authority: FCC
- Facility ID: 33821
- Class: C
- Power: 1,000 watts unlimited
- Transmitter coordinates: 40°26′14.9″N 104°43′26.9″W
- Translator: 102.1 K271BN (Estes Park)
- Repeater: 102.1 KGRE-FM (Estes Park)

Links
- Public license information: Public file; LMS
- Webcast: Listen live
- Website: www.tigrecolorado.com

KGRE (1450 kHz) is an AM radio station broadcasting a Regional Mexican format. Licensed to Greeley, Colorado, United States, it serves the Ft. Collins-Greeley area. The station is currently owned by Greeley Broadcasting Corporation.

== History ==
=== KYOU ===
The station went on the air as KYOU on August 24, 1948. Owned for 30 years by the Meroco Broadcasting Company, the station broadcast with 250 watts of power from a transmitter at 2424 6th Avenue. In 1961, KYOU relocated its transmitter outside of town and boosted its daytime power to 1,000 watts. KYOU was primarily a full-service station with ABC and Intermountain Network news, while its sister station KGRE (92.3, later 92.5 FM), established in 1967, aired middle-of-the-road music. KYOU-KGRE was acquired by O'Kieffe Broadcasting, owned by Donald O'Malley and George Keiffer, in 1978 for $770,000.

=== The 1980s and 1990s: ownership carousel ===
The 1980s brought a series of changes to 1450 AM, beginning with a 1983 sale of 84 percent of the stations to Kenneth R. Greenwood for $310,000 in October 1983 that provided immediate cash relief to O'Kieffe. Four months later, Greenwood sold the pair to Oklahoma-based Swab-Fox Services. In May 1984, KGRE and KYOU switched call letters, with KYOU moving to the FM to project a more regional image while KGRE at 1450 AM remained focused on Greeley; the FM station is now KKSE-FM, since moved from Greeley to Broomfield, Colorado. Later that year, however, the stations would change ownership again when Swab-Fox merged with the publisher of the Tulsa Tribune newspaper. KGRE (and KYOU) had now flipped to separately programmed country formats.

Ownership in KGRE changed yet again when Denver-based Surrey Broadcasting Company, trading as Surco of Northern Colorado, acquired KGRE and KYOU for $1.7 million in 1986. The new owners changed the call letters to KATR on August 10 of that year, though the station continued to play country music. Surrey sold the station in 1988—the fifth and final sale in the 1980s—to Robert and Marjorie Zellmer, this time without the former FM sister, for $230,000. KATR reclaimed the KGRE call letters on January 1, 1989.

The Zellmers held onto KGRE until 1991, when it was sold to Keith M. Ashton for $275,000. The next year, Ashton thought he had found a buyer: Ross Fleischmann, a postal executive from Oklahoma City, who agreed to buy KGRE for $350,000, including the assumption of a loan Ashton had taken on to buy the station, in November 1992. With the sale awaiting closure, Fleischmann brought in general manager Paul Lowrey. However, the station began to lose money, and several months later, the deal collapsed, leading to the station and Ashton each declaring bankruptcy; in 1995, Ashton sued Fleischmann in Colorado court.

Hispanic Broadcasting Corporation acquired the station for $170,000 in 1994, though Ashton remained on as the general manager of KGRE and the station's format remained in English, with oldies replacing country. However, by this point, KGRE was only operating 10 hours a day; it lost $5,000 to $10,000 a month, and its equipment included battered tape recorders, wobbly turntables and scratched records.

=== El Tigre ===
KGRE's ownership carousel, however, was about to come to an end. Ricardo Salazar, a radio consultant and DJ from Los Angeles who had previously been the Spanish-language radio voice of the Los Angeles Raiders, was looking to start a broadcasting business of his own. He acquired KGRE for $150,000 in 1997, risking all of his savings and maxing out seven credit cards. Salazar described the station as a "minus five" on a one-to-ten scale when he acquired it. The station was reborn as Regional Mexican outlet El Tigre, and Salazar turned around its finances. It was profitable by the end of 1997; by 2006, station revenue surpassed $600,000 a year, thanks to an annual growth rate of 20 to 30 percent. Salazar expanded and bought additional stations in Colorado, including a second Tigre station for southern Colorado (KFCS-KRYE) and an FM signal (KGRE-FM 102.1, plus a translator on 102.1 that fixes KGRE's signal issues in Greeley proper, acquired in 2018).

Ricardo Salazar died in 2018 at the age of 67; his daughter Lindsay continues to run KGRE.
