= KKLI =

- Widefield, Colorado; United States
- Broadcast area: Colorado Springs-Pueblo metropolitan area
- Frequency: 106.3 MHz (HD Radio)
- Branding: Sunny 106.3

Programming
- Format: Adult contemporary
- Subchannels: HD2: K-Love
- Affiliations: Premiere Networks

Ownership
- Owner: iHeartMedia; (iHM Licenses, LLC)
- Sister stations: KBPL, KCCY-FM, KVUU, KIBT

History
- First air date: 1987 (as KKQX)
- Former call signs: KKQX (1986–1988)
- Call sign meaning: Station branded as "K-Lite"

Technical information
- Licensing authority: FCC
- Facility ID: 67187
- Class: C2
- ERP: 1,600 watts
- HAAT: 678 meters (2,224 ft)
- Transmitter coordinates: 38°44′41″N 104°51′46″W
- Translator: HD2: 103.1 K276GG (Colorado Springs)

Links
- Public license information: Public file; LMS
- Webcast: Listen Live; Listen Live (HD2)
- Website: sunny1063online.iheart.com klove.com (HD2)

KKLI (106.3 FM), also known as Sunny 106.3, is a commercial radio station licensed to Widefield, Colorado, and serving the Colorado Springs-Pueblo metropolitan area. The station is owned by iHeartMedia and broadcasts an adult contemporary radio format, switching to Christmas music for much of November and December.

KKLI carries several nationally syndicated programs from co-owned Premiere Networks. On weekdays, "Valentine in The Morning" from KBIG Los Angeles is broadcast in AM drive time. "Delilah," a call in and request show, airs in the evening. And on Saturday mornings, "Ellen K" from KOST Los Angeles is heard.

== History ==
The station signed on in 1987 as KKQX, broadcasting a soft adult contemporary format. It changed to its present call sign KKLI in 1988 when a Portland, Oregon station dropped those call letters and changed its format. KKLI used various forms of the 'Lite' moniker for its first two and a half decades on the air.

The station was owned by Colorado Springs radio veteran Henry Tippie (d/b/a Tippie Communications, Inc.) in the early 1990s. Following deregulation in 1996, Citadel Broadcasting in Colorado Springs (which also owned KKFM and KKMG) acquired the station.

In a multi-station swap deal, KKLI was sold in 1999 to Capstar Broadcasting, which merged with Chancellor Broadcasting to become AMFM Inc. Soon after, it was absorbed into Clear Channel Communications. Clear Channel Communications became iHeartMedia in 2014. On November 6, 2014, K-Lite rebranded as "Sunny 106.3".
