= KFCS =

Radio station in Colorado Springs, Colorado

Simulcasts KRYE Beulah
- Colorado Springs, Colorado; United States
- Broadcast area: Southern Colorado
- Frequency: 1580 kHz
- Branding: El Tigre

Programming
- Format: Regional Mexican

Ownership
- Owner: Lindsey Salazar; (Greeley Broadcasting Corp.)

History
- First air date: June 1957
- Former call signs: KPIK (1957–1987); KWYD (1987–2005); KKKK (2005–2010); KREL (2010–2015); KHIG (2015)

Technical information
- Licensing authority: FCC
- Facility ID: 51816
- Class: D
- Power: 10,000 watts day; 140 watts night
- Transmitter coordinates: 38°43′11″N 104°43′16″W
- Translator: 101.5 K268DV (Colorado Springs)

Links
- Public license information: Public file; LMS
- Webcast: Listen live
- Website: tigrecolorado.com

KFCS (1580 AM) is a radio station licensed to Colorado Springs, Colorado, United States. It is owned by Lindsey Salazar's Greeley Broadcasting Corp., and simulcasts the regional Mexican format of KRYE in Beulah.

== History ==
KPIK went on the air in June 1957. It was owned by the Western Broadcasting Company, controlled by David Pinkston and Leroy Elmore. KPIK broadcast during the daytime only with 5,000 watts and broadcast a country music format from its first day of operation. The station expanded to FM when it acquired KLST (94.3 FM) in 1966 and converted it to a simulcast as KPIK-FM (now KILO). KPIK-FM was just the second all-country music station on FM in the United States. The AM and FM stations remained a simulcast through 1977, when the FM moved toward a more contemporary country sound as "Super K-94" while the AM station focused on more traditional country. That same year, station manager George James was elected to the Colorado Springs city council.

Pinkston, with various partners, owned the station until selling it to the Area Broadcasting Company, headed by James, in 1978; this separated it from the FM station. It was sold again in 1980 to KPIK Broadcasting, Inc.

In 1987, the station became KWYD under the ownership of Edward J. Patrick who at the time owned KWYD-FM. While Patrick sold off KWYD-FM in 1989, Patrick continued to own KWYD (AM) until he sold it in 1998. The call letters changed to KKKK in 2005 and KREL in 2010. As KREL, the station aired a sports radio format, first from ESPN Radio starting in January 2013 and as a Fox Sports Radio affiliate from October 2014 to April 2015.

On Monday, April 13, 2015, the station switched to cannabis-centric talk as "K-High 1580" with the call sign KHIG. The talk format moved online after one month, with KHIG temporarily switching to a simulcast of KFEZ.

In 2016, Jacob Barker acquired the station through licensee Gabrielle Broadcasting Licensee II, LLC. Under Barker, the station programmed a Christian talk format as "1580 The Trumpet" and gained a translator signal on 103.1 FM in the immediate Colorado Springs area. The format and name were also used on Barker's Phoenix station, KXEG.

In 2019, Gabrielle went into bankruptcy and a receiver, Jim Mross Engineering, was appointed for the station. Operations were taken over by the Greeley Broadcasting Corporation, which owns regional Mexican station KRYE; in September 2019, Mross filed to sell the station outright to Greeley for $85,000. The acquisition gave El Tigre's southern Colorado station, which had previously only covered Pueblo by way of KRYE-FM, a local signal in Colorado Springs. The sale to Greeley Broadcasting was consummated on December 20, 2019.
