= KCEG (AM) =

- Fountain, Colorado; United States
- Broadcast area: Colorado Springs, Colorado
- Frequency: 890 kHz

Programming
- Format: Classic country

Ownership
- Owner: Timothy C. Cutforth

History
- First air date: 2012
- Former call signs: KJME (2005–2022)

Technical information
- Licensing authority: FCC
- Facility ID: 135886
- Class: D
- Power: 2,500 watts day; 12 watts night
- Transmitter coordinates: 38°49′8″N 104°46′33.9″W
- Translator: 105.1 K286CO (Colorado Springs)

Links
- Public license information: Public file; LMS

KCEG (890 kHz) is an American AM radio station licensed to serve the community of Fountain, Colorado. The station is owned by Timothy C. Cutforth. It went on the air in 2012 as KJME, an adult standards and big band music station, and later aired classic country, sports, and all-Beatles formats before returning to classic country as KCEG in 2022.

== History ==
More than four years after the initial application was filed, this station received its original construction permit from the Federal Communications Commission (FCC) on July 28, 2005. The new station was assigned the KJME call sign by the FCC on August 19, 2005. The construction permit was scheduled to expire on July 28, 2008.

The station belatedly applied for a license to cover on August 1, 2008, but the FCC dismissed the application on February 19, 2009, and the station was deleted from the FCC database. Station owner Timothy C. Cutforth filed a Petition for Reconsideration on March 23, 2009. While a similar petition for KJJL (540 AM), a station Cutforth intended to build at Pine Bluffs, Wyoming, was denied in June 2009, the Commission granted KJME special temporary authority to operate on October 6, 2009, and restored the station's call sign to the FCC database. The station's license was issued on January 6, 2012.

KJME began broadcasting in early 2012 with an adult standards/big band music format. In 2013, the station aired classic country music. On August 1, 2014, the station began airing sports as an NBC Sports Radio affiliate. In December 2016, KJME switched to an all-Beatles format as "890 Yesterday".

On December 11, 2018, KJME posted on its Facebook page that it had ceased broadcasting given its "broadcast towers facility has reached the end of its agreement" and was not renewed, noting the station had "powered off until further notice" on November 24, 2018. On January 9, 2020, the same page said the owner was "working on some transmitter issues", with no promise as to when the station would be back on air.

On February 7, 2022, KJME swapped call signs and formats with sister station KCEG (780 AM), returning to classic country.
