= KGRE-FM =

Coordinates: 40.361°N 105.521°W

Simulcast of KGRE (AM)
- Estes Park, Colorado; United States
- Broadcast area: Fort Collins, Colorado
- Frequency: 102.1 MHz
- Branding: El Tigre

Programming
- Format: Regional Mexican

Ownership
- Owner: Lindsey Salazar; (Greeley Broadcasting Corporation)

History
- First air date: 1998
- Former call signs: KEZZ (1996–1998); KRKI (1998–2000); KXUU (2000–2002); KXDC (2002–2006); KRKY-FM (2006–2015)
- Call sign meaning: "Tigre"

Technical information
- Licensing authority: FCC
- Facility ID: 76780
- Class: A
- ERP: 6,000 watts
- HAAT: 25 meters

Links
- Public license information: Public file; LMS
- Webcast: Listen live
- Website: www.tigrecolorado.com

KGRE-FM (102.1 MHz) is a commercial radio station located in Estes Park, Colorado, broadcasting to the Fort Collins, Colorado area. KGRE-FM airs a Regional Mexican music format branded as El Tigre, simulcasting KGRE 1450 AM Greeley, Colorado.

An additional 65-watt booster provides fill-in service to Fort Collins, while KGRE AM has a dependent co-channel translator (K271BN) that extends the FM signal to Greeley proper.

== History ==
KGRE went on the air in 1998 and, after a two-year stint as a local station for Estes Park known as "102.1 K-Rocky" (KRKI), made several failed attempts to serve the Denver metro area. On August 24, 2000, it flipped to Top 40 as "U102" under new calls KXUU. The Top 40 format lasted only a few weeks and quickly gave way to Rhythmic CHR under the same name, largely due to new competition from cross-town KFMD 95.7 ("Kiss FM"). The station then morphed into Urban AC, again as "U102," before scrapping the concept in favor of a Dance format as "102-1X" (KXDC) in June 2002. KXDC, in turn, gave way to a satellite-fed Classic Country format known as "102-1 Thunder Country" in May 2003. Following the purchase of Colorado Springs country outlet KKCS-FM 101.9, 102.1 assumed a simulcast of that station, which remained on the air until nearby KJEB 102.3 (now KVOQ) completed its move into the Denver market and obliterated the more distant 102.1 signal.

On January 3, 2019, an application was filed with the FCC for Greeley Broadcasting Corporation, which owns KGRE AM, to buy KGRE-FM; the company also applied to buy K271BN at that time. The sale was consummated on July 31, 2019, at a price of $1.175 million.
