= KZNT =

Radio station in Colorado Springs, Colorado

Coordinates: 38°49′34″N 104°44′29″W

- Colorado Springs, Colorado; United States
- Broadcast area: Colorado Springs metropolitan area
- Frequency: 1460 kHz
- Branding: AM 1460 The Answer

Programming
- Format: Conservative talk
- Affiliations: Fox News Radio, Salem Radio Network

Ownership
- Owner: Salem Media Group; (Bison Media, Inc.)
- Sister stations: KGFT

History
- First air date: December 21, 1956
- Former call signs: KAFA (1956–1958); KYSN (1958–1983); KKHT (1983–1985); KKCS (1985–1989, 1990-2003); KWES (1989–1990)
- Call sign meaning: "News talk"

Technical information
- Licensing authority: FCC
- Facility ID: 70825
- Class: B
- Power: 5,000 watts day 540 watts night
- Translator: 101.1 K266CK (Colorado Springs)

Links
- Public license information: Public file; LMS
- Webcast: Listen Live
- Website: am1460theanswer.com

KZNT (1460 AM) is a conservative talk radio station owned by Salem Media Group broadcasting in Colorado Springs, Colorado. In addition to broadcasting nationally syndicated talk shows, it has two locally produced shows: the Mike Boyle Restaurant Show and Springs Radio Real Estate.

== History ==
1460 AM in Colorado Springs signed on December 21, 1956, as KAFA. The call letters changed to KYSN ("Kissin") on July 1, 1958, when the station was acquired by the General Broadcasting Corporation.

Despite having a restrictive directional signal and never more than 1,000 watts of power the station dominated radio listening in the Pikes Peak region into the mid-1970s as the market's AM Top 40 station.. A combination of the limited signal and inconsistent programming made KYSN vulnerable to the many FM signals booming off of Cheyenne Mountain. They declined throughout the late 1970s. In 1983 the station changed to an oldies format and changed its calls to KKHT (AM 1460 KHT).

In 1985, 1460 flipped to a simulcast of its country music sister station KKCS-FM, and adopted the same call letters for the AM band.

KKCS deviated away from the simulcast several times, adopting a classic country format and later a news–talk format. In 2003, Salem Communications purchased AM 1460, adopting a news–talk format with the call letters KZNT.

On January 5, 2015, KZNT rebranded as "1460 The Answer".

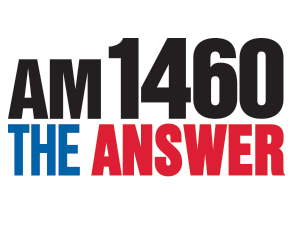
Former logo
