= KQSC =

Radio station in Colorado Springs, Colorado

Simulcasting KDZA Pueblo
- Colorado Springs, Colorado; United States
- Frequency: 1530 kHz
- Branding: 101.9 107.3 KDZA

Programming
- Format: Classic hits

Ownership
- Owner: Richard Gillenwaters; (Mountain Radio Group Inc.)

History
- First air date: February 9, 1964
- Former call signs: KRYT (1964–1977); KXXV (1977–1979); KKCS (1979–1981); KCMN (1982–2015); KKHI (2/2015–10/2015)

Technical information
- Licensing authority: FCC
- Facility ID: 33731
- Class: D
- Power: 15,000 watts day; 1,000 watts critical hours; 15 watts night
- Transmitter coordinates: 38°49′8″N 104°46′32″W
- Translators: 97.7 K249FK (Pueblo); 107.3 K297BQ (Colorado Springs)

Links
- Public license information: Public file; LMS
- Webcast: Listen Live
- Website: kdzaradio.com

KQSC (1530 AM) is a radio station licensed to broadcast from Colorado Springs, Colorado, United States, with a daytime power of 15,000 watts, and can be heard by day from the outskirts of Denver to the state's border with New Mexico.

== History ==
In August 2006, Don Crawford Jr. bought the then-KCMN and a sister station, KCBR, from his father's radio company, Crawford Broadcasting, for an undisclosed amount (formally, KCMN was purchased by a new company called DJR Broadcasting, owned by Crawford). The new owner said that the formats and staffing would stay the same at the stations. Crawford had begun working at Crawford Broadcasting in 1989, and had been a regional manager since 1994, responsible for the company's stations in Colorado Springs, Denver, Dallas, Los Angeles and San Francisco. Following the purchase, Crawford was to continue to manage KAAM in Dallas, which continues to run a "Legends" adult standards format similar to KCMN's former format.

Beginning in 2007, the station began broadcasting in HD Radio format.

In 2012, DJR Broadcasting sold KCMN (along with sister station KCBR) to the locally owned Pueblo Radio Group. PRG flipped KCMN from "Legends 1530" to an oldies format, even though KCMN added Classic Top 40/Oldies titles from the 1960s, 1970s, and 1980s under the ownerships of Crawford Sr. and Jr.

On February 5, 2015, KCMN changed their call letters to KKHI.

On March 18, 2015, Kona Coast Radio closed on their acquisition of KKHI at a price of $200,000. Following the acquisition, KKHI went silent. On October 16, 2015, the station changed their call sign to KQSC.

Effective December 10, 2015, KQSC was sold by Kona Coast Radio to Mountain Radio Group Inc., at a purchase price of $200,000. On January 1, 2016, KQSC flipped to a country music format called Mountain Country 1530.

On November 11, 2024, KQSC changed their format from country music to a simulcast of classic hits-formatted KDZA 1230 AM Pueblo.
