= KIQN (FM) =

Coordinates: 37.781111°N 104.534167°W

Colorado City, Colorado; United States
- Broadcast area: Pueblo, Colorado
- Frequency: 103.3 MHz (HD Radio)
- Branding: KIQ'N Country 103.3

Programming
- Format: Country

Ownership
- Owner: Pueblo Broadcasting

History
- First air date: 2011
- Former call signs: KJQY (2006–2014); KLEZ (2014–2015); KJQY (2015)
- Call sign meaning: "Kickin'"

Technical information
- Licensing authority: FCC
- Facility ID: 164269
- Class: C
- ERP: 100,000 watts
- HAAT: 165 meters

Links
- Public license information: Public file; LMS
- Webcast: Listen Live

KIQN (KIQ'N Country 103.3) is a radio station licensed to Colorado City, Colorado, and serving the Pueblo and Colorado Springs areas with a country music format. KIQN is owned by Pueblo Broadcasting Group, LLC.

== History ==
103.3 FM flipped from its Rhythmic AC format on May 31, 2012 by stunting with a Polka format for seven days before settling into a high-energy Rhythmic Top 40 format, offering a hybrid mix of currents, old school and Dance hits, the latter being heavily dayparted in evenings. The evening block of programming is branded as "Radio Planeta" and features a bilingual English/Spanish combination of dance music.

According to station owner Steven R Bartholomew, "This station represents music with energy!"

KIQN has been granted a construction permit to move to 103.1 FM.

On September 1, 2015, the then-KJQY changed their format to country, branded as "KIQ'N Country". The station changed its call sign to the current KIQN on November 23, 2015.
