= KCCY-FM =

Radio station in Pueblo, Colorado

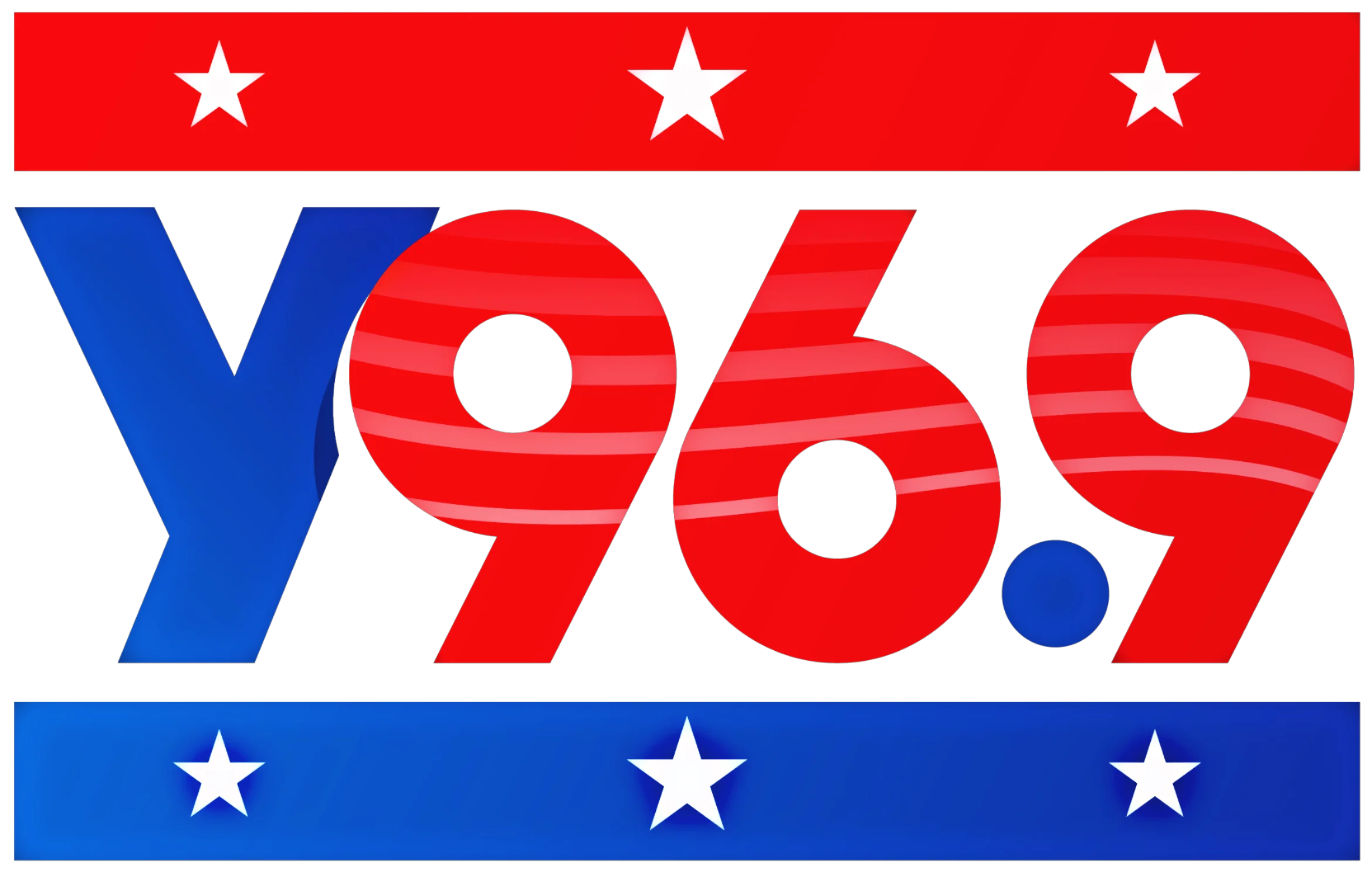

Pueblo, Colorado; United States
- Broadcast area: Colorado Springs-Pueblo-Denver
- Frequency: 96.9 MHz (HD Radio)
- Branding: Y96.9

Programming
- Format: Country
- Affiliations: Premiere Networks

Ownership
- Owner: iHeartMedia, Inc.; (iHM Licenses, LLC)
- Sister stations: KBPL, KCSJ, KIBT, KKLI, KPHT, KUBE, KVUU

History
- First air date: 1975 (as KDJQ on 97.9)
- Former call signs: KDJQ (1975–1978); KCSJ-FM (1978–1979); KCCY (1979–2012)
- Former frequencies: 97.9 MHz (1975–1993)

Technical information
- Licensing authority: FCC
- Facility ID: 40847
- Class: C
- ERP: 72,000 watts
- HAAT: 695 meters (2,280 ft)
- Transmitter coordinates: 38°44′43″N 104°51′41″W

Links
- Public license information: Public file; LMS
- Webcast: Listen Live
- Website: y969.iheart.com

KCCY-FM (96.9 MHz, "Y96.9") is a radio station broadcasting a country format. Licensed to Pueblo, Colorado, United States, it serves the Colorado Springs area. The station is currently owned by iHeartMedia, Inc.

KCCY was originally owned by McCoy Broadcasting, with its offices and studio located in Pueblo. In 2001, the station was acquired by Clear Channel Communications. Its offices and studios were then moved to Colorado Springs.

== History ==
Original callsign for this facility was KDJQ when the station signed on in 1975 as an automated Top 40 station on 97.9. The station was assigned the callsign KCSJ-FM on October 11, 1978. On January 25, 1979, the station changed its call sign to KCCY; the "-FM" suffix was added on April 1, 2012. In 1993, the station moved from its original frequency of 97.9 MHz to 96.9 in order to make room for KKFM, which moved to 98.1.

Former White House press secretary, now Fox News Channel personality, Dana Perino worked there on the 2 to 6 a.m. shift while attending college.
