= KVUU =

Coordinates: 38.746°N 104.862°W

- Pueblo, Colorado; United States
- Broadcast area: Colorado Springs-Pueblo
- Frequency: 99.9 MHz (HD Radio)
- Branding: My 99.9

Programming
- Format: Hot adult contemporary
- Subchannels: HD2: Way-FM (Contemporary Christian)

Ownership
- Owner: iHeartMedia, Inc.; (iHM Licenses, LLC)
- Sister stations: KBPL, KCCY-FM, KCSJ, KIBT, KPHT, KUBE

History
- First air date: 1975; 51 years ago (as KPUB-FM)
- Former call signs: KPUB-FM (1975–1978); KYNR (1978–1983)
- Call sign meaning: From its previous branding "K-View"

Technical information
- Licensing authority: FCC
- Facility ID: 35868
- Class: C
- ERP: 57,000 watts 79,000 watts with beam tilt
- HAAT: 670 meters (2,200 ft)
- Translators: HD2: 93.9 K230BO (Monument); HD2: 99.3 K257FO (Colorado Springs)

Links
- Public license information: Public file; LMS
- Webcast: My 99.9 Listen Live; HD2: Way-FM Listen Live
- Website: https://my999radio.iheart.com/ HD2: wayfm.com

KVUU (99.9 FM) is a commercial radio station licensed to Pueblo, Colorado, and serving the Colorado Springs-Pueblo radio market. It airs a Hot AC radio format and is owned by iHeartMedia, Inc. The station is known by its moniker My 99.9.

Studios and offices are in the iHeart radio complex on South Circle Drive in Colorado Springs. Its transmitter is also in Colorado Springs, on a tower shared with other FM and TV stations on Cheyenne Mountain. The station can be heard as far north as the Denver Metropolitan Area, including both Denver and Arvada. KVUU broadcasts in the HD Radio format. Its HD-2 subchannel carries the Way-FM Christian Contemporary music network. That subchannel feeds two translator stations, 93.9 K230BO Monument, and 99.3 K257FO Colorado Springs.

== 99.9 FM history ==
In 1975, the station first signed on as KPUB-FM. It was owned by the Quixote Broadcasting Company and it simulcast its sister station, AM 1480 KPUB (now KIXD). The two stations aired a country music format. Because KPUB was a daytimer, listeners could tune into KPUB-FM after sunset to continue hearing the station.

In 1978, KPUB-FM was acquired by Radio Colorado Springs. The new owners changed the call sign to KYNR, launching a beautiful music format.

In 1983, the studios were moved to Colorado Springs, as KYNR adopted the KVUU call letters, "K-View" moniker, and adult contemporary music format. The station was owned by the Peoria Journal Star newspaper until it was acquired by Triathlon Broadcasting Of Colorado Springs in 1996.

In 1999, Triathlon was acquired by AM/FM, Inc. (later absorbed into Clear Channel Communications, a forerunner of current owner iHeartMedia); at about the same time, KVUU evolved into a Hot AC format. In the Summer of 2005, it rebranded itself as "My 99.9" playing hits from the 1970s, 1980s, 1990s and 2000s. In 2007, it dropped the 70s and most 80s hits, evolving towards an Adult Top 40 format to compete with Top 40/CHR leader KKMG.

KVUU played hits from the 2000s and current music on the Hot AC charts, along with contemporary hit songs not usually heard on Hot AC stations, including some Rap music and R&B titles. On March 7, 2008, Radio & Records moved KVUU from the Hot AC panel to the Top 40/CHR panel, in part due to its conversion to a CHR direction. In addition, Mediabase also started listing KVUU as a Top 40/CHR reporter as well.

In the 2010s, KVUU moved back to a Hot AC format with elected to use Premium Choice's music playlist around the clock, while only using the voicetracked talent Every night from midnight to 6 am which was cut an hour short during weeknights due to the Morning show starring Johnjay and Rich at 5-10 AM.

In 2020 the station only using the voice tracked talent Everyday. The same music and some of the talent heard on the station could also be heard on iHeartRadio's "Today's Mix", which is the national hot AC programming of Premium Choice.
