= Pueblo Community College =

Community college in Pueblo, Colorado, U.S.

- Former names: Southern Colorado Junior College (1933–1937); Pueblo Junior College (1937–1946); Pueblo College (1946-1961); Southern Colorado State College (1961–1979); Pueblo Vocational Community College (1979–1982)
- Type: Public community college
- Established: 1933
- Parent institution: Colorado Community College System
- Academic affiliations: Space-grant
- President: Dr. Chato Hazelbaker
- Location: Pueblo, Colorado, United States; 38.26248°N 104.63765°W
- Colors: Maroon and Black
- Nickname: PCC
- Mascot: Panthers
- Website: www.pueblocc.edu
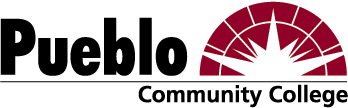

Pueblo Community College (PCC) is a public community college in Pueblo, Colorado. PCC operates branch campuses in Cañon City and Mancos, as well as an academic site in Durango.

== History ==
Known now as Pueblo Community College (PCC), the school originated in 1933 with the incorporation of Southern Colorado Junior College (SCJC). Classes were held in the Pueblo County Courthouse until 1936, when the first building opened on the current Orman Avenue campus. In 1937, SCJC became part of the Pueblo County Junior College District and was renamed Pueblo Junior College. The name was simplified to Pueblo College in the late 1940s when vocational rehabilitation training was added.

The Colorado General Assembly passed legislation in 1961 to dissolve the junior college district and change the school’s status to a four-year institution governed by the Board of Trustees for State Colleges. At that time, it was renamed Southern Colorado State College (SCSC). Programs were offered at the Orman Avenue campus and a new campus on the north side of Pueblo in the Belmont neighborhood.

In 1974, SCSC designated the Orman campus vocational programs as the College for Community Services and Career Education. One year later, the general assembly passed legislation to allow the Orman campus to operate as a technical community college and in 1978, the state legislature passed a bill to make the campus a free-standing institution that was no longer part of the four-year school. On July 1, 1979, it became Pueblo Vocational Community College; the name was changed to Pueblo Community College on July 1, 1982.

PCC established a permanent presence in Cañon City in 1986, leasing facilities on the grounds of Holy Cross Abbey. On March 11, 2000, construction began on a stand-alone campus and the first classes were held in the fall of 2001.

In 1988, an agreement between PCC and San Juan Basin Vocational Technical School (now San Juan Technical College) allowed PCC to offer classes in Cortez. Due to demand, programs were added in Durango and the Southwest campus was formed.

In 2006, PCC president Mike Davis died in a plane crash while traveling to the branch campus in Durango. He had been with the school for five years.

== Academics ==
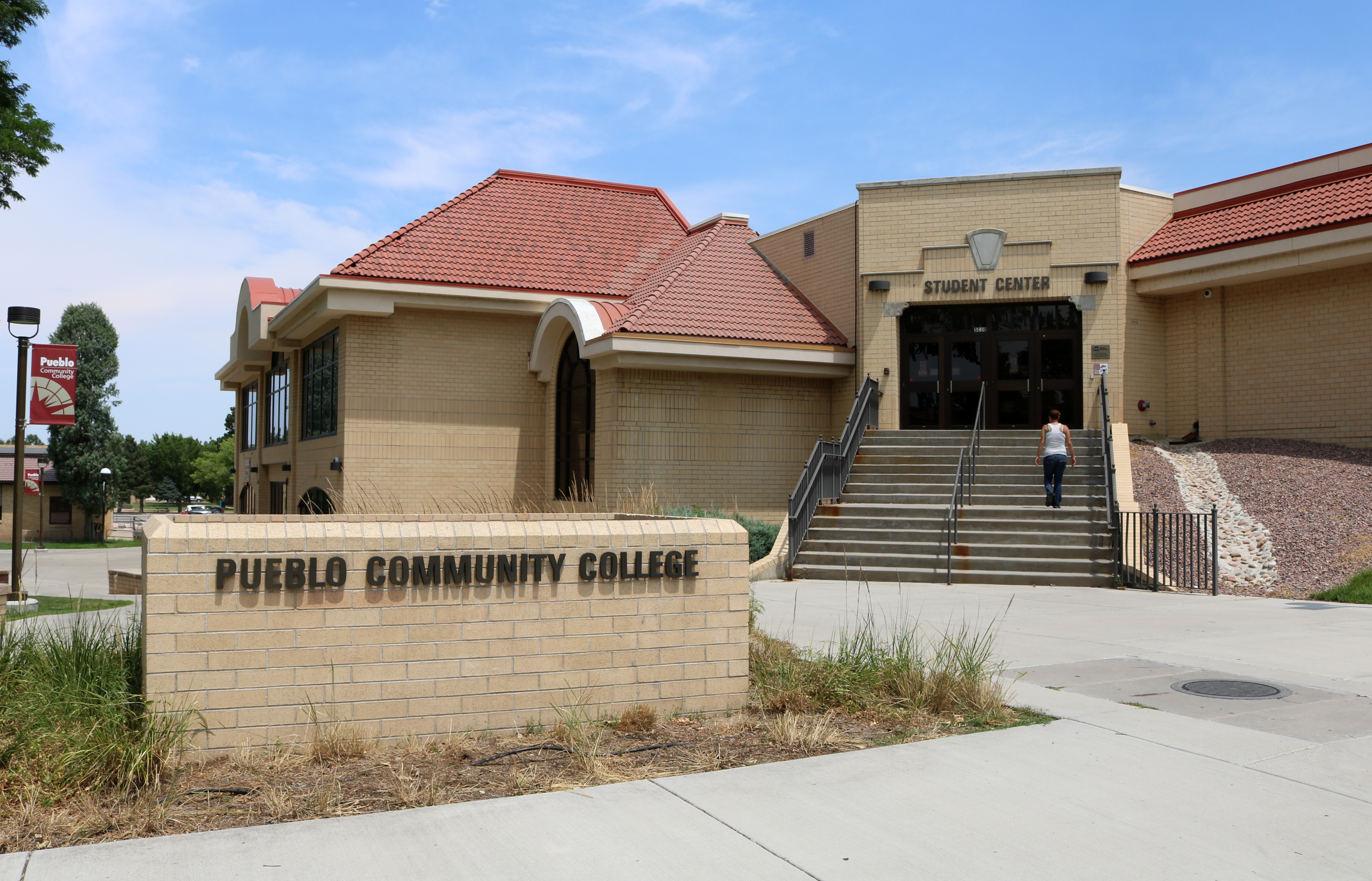
PCC Student Center

On average, PCC serves more than 5,000 students annually across its campuses. The college is accredited by The Higher Learning Commission.

PCC offers more than 70 degree and certificate programs in career and technical education as well as liberal arts and sciences transfer pathways. Through its concurrent enrollment program, students throughout PCC's service area can earn college credit while they are still in high school and tuition is paid by a student's school district, potentially saving families thousands of dollars.

PCC also offers nine bachelor degree completion programs, all of which are online to fit the schedules of working professionals.
