= 106.3 FM =

FM radio frequency

The following radio stations broadcast on FM frequency 106.3 MHz:

== Argentina ==
- Aleluya in Buenos Aires
- Centro in Oberá, Misiones
- Gamba in Córdoba
- Güemes in Salta
- Independencia in Villa Mercedes, San Luis
- isla del Cerrito in Resistencia, Chaco
- La 100 Mar del Plata in Mar del Plata, Buenos Aires
- La1063FM in Villa San José, Entre Ríos
- Líder in Salta
- Metro Bahia in Bahía Blanca, Buenos Aires
- Milenium in Buenos Aires
- Radio 10 Rosario in Rosario, Santa Fe
- RKM Mendoza in Mendoza
- Romance in San Miguel de Tucumán
- San Expedito in Jardín América, Misiones
- Tropical in Rawson, Chubut

== Australia ==
- 4RGT in Townsville, Queensland
- ABC Classic in Rockhampton, Queensland
- ABC Northern Tasmania in Rosebery, Tasmania
- ABC South East NSW in Eden, New South Wales
- 3CCS in Colac, Victoria
- Flow FM in Healesville, Victoria
- Radio National in Sale, Victoria
- SBS Radio in Adelaide, South Australia

== Belize ==
- Mood FM

== Canada (Channel 292) ==
- CBV-FM in Quebec City, Quebec
- CFXN-FM in North Bay, Ontario
- CHKS-FM in Sarnia, Ontario
- CIFM-FM-7 in Pritchard, British Columbia
- CINS-FM in North Sydney, Nova Scotia
- CINU-FM in Truro, Nova Scotia
- CIPB-FM in Port aux Basques, Newfoundland and Labrador
- CIRJ-FM in Kingston, Ontario
- CISB-FM in Marius, Manitoba
- CJBC-5-FM in Peterborough, Ontario
- CJVR-FM-2 in Waskesiu Lake, Saskatchewan
- CKAV-FM-2 in Vancouver, British Columbia
- CKGR-FM in Golden, British Columbia
- CKIN-FM in Montreal, Quebec
- VF2214 in Luscar, Alberta
- CBD-FM-1 in St. Stephen, New Brunswick

== China ==
- CNR The Voice of China in Kaifeng

== Indonesia ==
- Urban Radio in Bandung

== Mexico ==
- XHETE-FM in Tehuacán, Puebla
- XHHDH-FM in Santa María Huatulco, Oaxaca
- XHIS-FM in Ciudad Guzmán, Jalisco
- XHITO-FM in Irapuato, Guanajuato
- XHLAYA-FM in Playa del Carmen, Quintana Roo
- XHPSP-FM in Piedras Negras, Coahuila
- XHRVI-FM in Ixtacomitán, Tabasco
- XHZIT-FM in Zitácuaro, Michoacán

== New Zealand ==
- Beach FM in the Kāpiti Coast

== Philippines ==
- BUFM in Legazpi, Albay
- DWLI in Rodriguez, Rizal
- DWYG in Batangas City
- DZVA in Calamba City
- DWVG in Cavite City
- DWBQ in Naga City
- DWBU in Legazpi City
- DWHR in Dagupan City
- DWLR in Lucena City
- DZRK in Quezon, Palawan
- DYBE in Bacolod City
- DYYD in Dumaguete City
- DYAM-FM in Toledo City, Cebu
- DYOD in Ormoc City
- DXHY in Cagayan de Oro City
- DXIQ in Malaybalay City, Bukidnon
- DXDI in Digos City
- DXKM in General Santos City
- Juander Radyo in Mati City
- DXCA in Pagadian City

== United Kingdom ==
- Bridge FM in Bridgend, South Wales
- MKFM in Bletchley Stadium, in Milton Keynes
- Chester's Dee Radio in Chester, England
- Original 106 in North Aberdeen, Peterhead, and East Neuk
- Q Radio in Maghera

== United States (Channel 292) ==
- KALI-FM in Santa Ana, California
- KBBL in Cazadero, California
- KBLK-LP in Shreveport, Louisiana
- KBMG in Evanston, Wyoming
- KBZS in Wichita Falls, Texas
- KCSY in Twisp, Washington
- KDBR in Kalispell, Montana
- KFRX in Lincoln, Nebraska
- KGAM (FM) in Merced, California
- KGMX in Lancaster, California
- KGOU in Norman, Oklahoma
- KHIJ-LP in Ottumwa, Iowa
- KHKZ in San Benito, Texas
- KIDJ in Sugar City, Idaho
- KIFT in Kremmling, Colorado
- KINS-FM in Blue Lake, California
- KIYS in Walnut Ridge, Arkansas
- KJBX in Cash, Arkansas
- KJZS-LP in Bozeman, Montana
- KKHR in Abilene, Texas
- KKLI in Widefield, Colorado
- KLBC in Durant, Oklahoma
- KLEN in Cheyenne, Wyoming
- KLOO-FM in Corvallis, Oregon
- KLXH in Thibodaux, Louisiana
- KMED in Eagle Point, Oregon
- KMJV in Soledad, California
- KMLR in Gonzales, Texas
- KOLL in Lonoke, Arkansas
- KOMR in Sun City, Arizona
- KOOC in Belton, Texas
- KPAN-FM in Hereford, Texas
- KPHR in Ortonville, Minnesota
- KPQW in Willows, California
- KPRB in Brush, Colorado
- KPSO-FM in Falfurrias, Texas
- KDBI-FM in Homedale, Idaho
- KRZK in Branson, Missouri
- KSEM in Seminole, Texas
- KSUP in Juneau, Alaska
- KTGV in Oracle, Arizona
- KUFW in Kingsburg, California
- KVHT in Vermillion, South Dakota
- KVSU in Desert Hills, Arizona
- KVYB in Oak View, California
- KWNZ in Lovelock, Nevada
- KWOF in Waukomis, Oklahoma
- KWRJ-LP in Elton, Louisiana
- KWWY in Shoshoni, Wyoming
- KXNO-FM in Ankeny, Iowa
- KXOT in Los Lunas, New Mexico
- KYGL in Texarkana, Arkansas
- KYMK-FM in Maurice, Louisiana
- KZKZ-FM in Greenwood, Arkansas
- KZLK in Rapid City, South Dakota
- WAIG-LP in Daytona Beach, Florida
- WAMX in Milton, West Virginia
- WBTG-FM in Sheffield, Alabama
- WBUK in Ottawa, Ohio
- WCDA in Versailles, Kentucky
- WCDK in Cadiz, Ohio
- WCDQ in Crawfordsville, Indiana
- WCEM-FM in Cambridge, Maryland
- WCIF in Melbourne, Florida
- WCIT-FM in Oneida, New York
- WCTL in Erie, Pennsylvania
- WDBF-FM in Mount Union, Pennsylvania
- WDMT in Marlinton, West Virginia
- WEAG-FM in Starke, Florida
- WEIB in Northampton, Massachusetts
- WEPB-LP in Noblesville, Indiana
- WESP in Jupiter, Florida
- WEVR-FM in River Falls, Wisconsin
- WFNQ in Nashua, New Hampshire
- WGCY in Gibson City, Illinois
- WGER in Saginaw, Michigan
- WGHR in Spring Hill, Florida
- WGLM-FM in Lakeview, Michigan
- WGMK in Donalsonville, Georgia
- WGMV in Stephenson, Michigan
- WGNG in Tchula, Mississippi
- WHCY in Blairstown, New Jersey
- WHKX in Bluefield, Virginia
- WHXR in Scarborough, Maine
- WIOP-LP in Shepherdsville, Kentucky
- WIPU-LP in Pembroke Pines, Florida
- WJML in Thompsonville, Michigan
- WJNI (FM) in Ladson, South Carolina
- WJPN-LP in Prince William, Virginia
- WJPT in Fort Myers, Florida
- WJSE in North Cape May, New Jersey
- WJYD in London, Ohio
- WKBX in Kingsland, Georgia
- WKMK in Eatontown, New Jersey
- WKNU in Brewton, Alabama
- WLCY in Blairsville, Pennsylvania
- WLUG-LP in Anniston, Alabama
- WMFG-FM in Hibbing, Minnesota
- WMNA-FM in Gretna, Virginia
- WMTK in Littleton, New Hampshire
- WNBZ-FM in Saranac, New York
- WOAH (FM) in Glennville, Georgia
- WBVR-FM in Horse Cave, Kentucky
- WPFT in Pigeon Forge, Tennessee
- WPLT (FM) in Sarona, Wisconsin
- WPNV-LP in Peoria, Illinois
- WQBZ in Fort Valley, Georgia
- WQCC in La Crosse, Wisconsin
- WQRL in Benton, Illinois
- WQSN in Norton, Virginia
- WQSV-LP in Staunton, Virginia
- WRAZ-FM in Key Largo, Florida
- WRDF in Columbia City, Indiana
- WRFZ-LP in Rochester, New York
- WRIL in Pineville, Kentucky
- WSBZ in Miramar Beach, Florida
- WSPA-FM in Simpsonville, South Carolina
- WSRB in Lansing, Illinois
- WTND-LP in Macomb, Illinois
- WTUF in Boston, Georgia
- WVSB in South Bend, Indiana
- WWKX in Woonsocket, Rhode Island
- WWMK in Onaway, Michigan
- WWQM-FM in Middleton, Wisconsin
- WWTL-LP in Logan, Ohio
- WXMT in Smethport, Pennsylvania
- WXNS-LP in Nashville, Tennessee
- WXOL-LP in Dresden, Tennessee
- WYAY (FM) in Bolivia, North Carolina
- WYMK in Mount Kisco, New York
- WYNN-FM in Florence, South Carolina
- WYRB in Genoa, Illinois
- WZLD in Petal, Mississippi
