= KBBL =

KBBL may refer to:

== Radio ==
- KBBL (FM), a radio station (106.3 FM) licensed to serve Cazadero, California, United States
- KJZY (FM), a radio station (93.7 FM) licensed to serve Sebastopol, California, which held the call sign KBBL from 2020 to 2022
- KGGI, a rhythmic contemporary radio station in Riverside, California, that held the callsign from 1965 to 1979
- KZTD, a regional Mexican radio station licensed to serve Cabot, Arkansas, that held the callsign from 1995 to 2003
- KPZK-FM, a religious station in Cabot, Arkansas, that held the callsign KBBL-FM from 1994 to 1996.
- KBBL-AM and KBBL-FM, fictional radio stations in The Simpsons

== Television ==
- KBBL-LP, a defunct television station (channel 56) formerly licensed to serve Springfield, Missouri.
- KXNW, a television station (channel 34) licensed to serve Eureka Springs, Arkansas, which used the call sign KBBL-TV from July 2006 to September 2006
- KWNL-CD, a television station (channel 9) licensed to serve Winslow, Arkansas, which used the call sign KBBL-CA from September 2003 to July 2006
