= WBTG =

WBTG may refer to:

- WBTG (AM), a radio station (1290 AM) licensed to Sheffield, Alabama, United States
- WBTG-FM, a radio station (106.3 FM) licensed to Sheffield, Alabama, United States
