= KPAN =

KPAN may refer to:

- KPAN (AM), a radio station (860 AM) licensed to Hereford, Texas, United States
- KPAN-FM, a radio station (106.3 FM) licensed to Hereford, Texas
- Payson Municipal Airport in Payson, Arizona (ICAO code KPAN)
- Korean People's Army Navy
