= KJZY =

KJZY may refer to:

- KJZY (FM), a radio station (93.7 FM) licensed to serve Sebastopol, California, United States
- KBBL (FM), a radio station (106.3 FM) licensed to serve Cazadero, California, which held the call sign KJZY from 2020 to 2022
- KFZO, a radio station (99.1 FM) licensed to serve Denton, Texas, United States, which held the call sign KJZY from 1988 to 1992
