= KBBC =

KBBC may refer to:

- KBBC (FM), a radio station (99.7 FM) licensed to serve Tishomingo, Oklahoma, United States
- Kuala Belait Boat Club, a tourist attraction located in Kuala Belait
- KVME-TV, a television station (channel 20) licensed to Bishop, California, United States, which used the call sign KBBC-TV from August 2007 to April 2012
- KMVP-FM, a radio station (98.7 FM) licensed to Phoenix, Arizona, United States, which used the call sign KBBC-FM from June 1980 to March 1982
