= KTRY =

KTRY may refer to:

- KTRY-LP, a defunct low-power television station (channel 39) formerly licensed to serve Pinedale, Wyoming, United States
- KBBL (FM), a radio station (106.3 FM) licensed to serve Cazadero, California, United States, which held the call sign KTRY from 2010 to 2015
