= KLBC =

- Durant, Oklahoma; United States
- Broadcast area: Durant, Oklahoma; Denison, Texas
- Frequency: 106.3 MHz
- Branding: 106.3 KLBC

Programming
- Format: Country music

Ownership
- Owner: Kinion Whittington; (Mid-Continental Broadcasting, LLC)
- Sister stations: KBBC (FM), KSEO

Technical information
- Licensing authority: FCC
- Facility ID: 17754
- Class: C3
- ERP: 16,500 watts
- HAAT: 123 meters (404 ft)
- Transmitter coordinates: 34.03667°N 96.42694°W

Links
- Public license information: Public file; LMS
- Webcast: Listen live
- Website: klbcfm.com

KLBC is a radio station airing a country music format licensed to Durant, Oklahoma, United States, broadcasting on 106.3 FM. The station serves the areas of Durant and Denison, Texas, and is owned by Kinion Whittington, through licensee Mid-Continental Broadcasting, LLC.
