= Durant, Oklahoma =

City in Oklahoma, US

- City
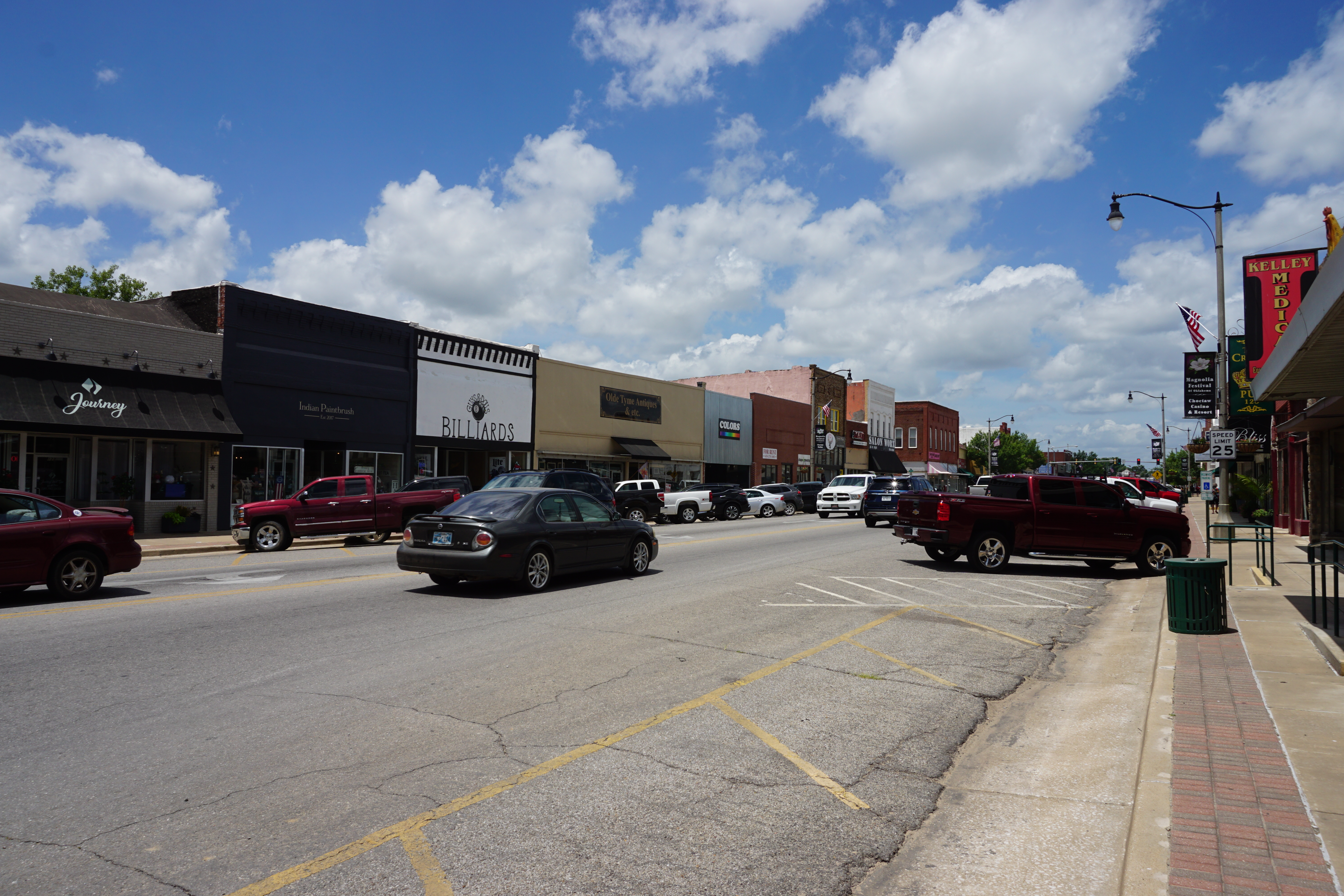
- Main Street in Durant

- Seal Logo
- Nicknames: City of Magnolias and Gateway to Lake Texoma
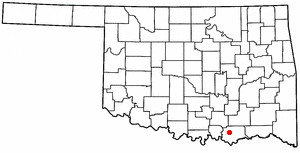
- Location within the state of Oklahoma

- Location in the United States
- Coordinates: 33°59′59″N 96°23′5″W
- Country: United States
- State: Oklahoma
- County: Bryan
- Established: 1872

Government
  - Mayor: Martin Tucker (R)
  - Vice Mayor: Mike Simulescu
  - City Manager: Tim Rundell

Area
  - Total: 27.83 sq mi (72.08 km^{2})
  - Land: 27.76 sq mi (71.89 km^{2})
  - Water: 0.069 sq mi (0.18 km^{2})
- Elevation: 669 ft (204 m)

Population (2020)
  - Total: 18,589
  - Density: 669.7/sq mi (258.56/km^{2})
- Time zone: UTC-6 (CST)
  - Summer (DST): UTC-5 (CDT)
- ZIP codes: 74701-74702
- Area code: 580
- FIPS code: 40-22050
- GNIS feature ID: 2410375
- Website: www.durant.org

Durant (/duːrænt/) is a city in and the county seat of Bryan County, Oklahoma, United States. Its population was 18,589 in the 2020 census. It is the home of the headquarters of the Choctaw Nation, and is the largest settlement on the reservation, ranking ahead of McAlester and Poteau. The city was founded by Dixon Durant, a Choctaw who lived in the area, after the Missouri–Kansas–Texas Railroad came through the Indian Territory in the early 1870s. It became the county seat of Bryan County in 1907 after Oklahoma statehood. The city is officially known as the Magnolia Capital of Oklahoma. Durant is home to Southeastern Oklahoma State University.

== History ==
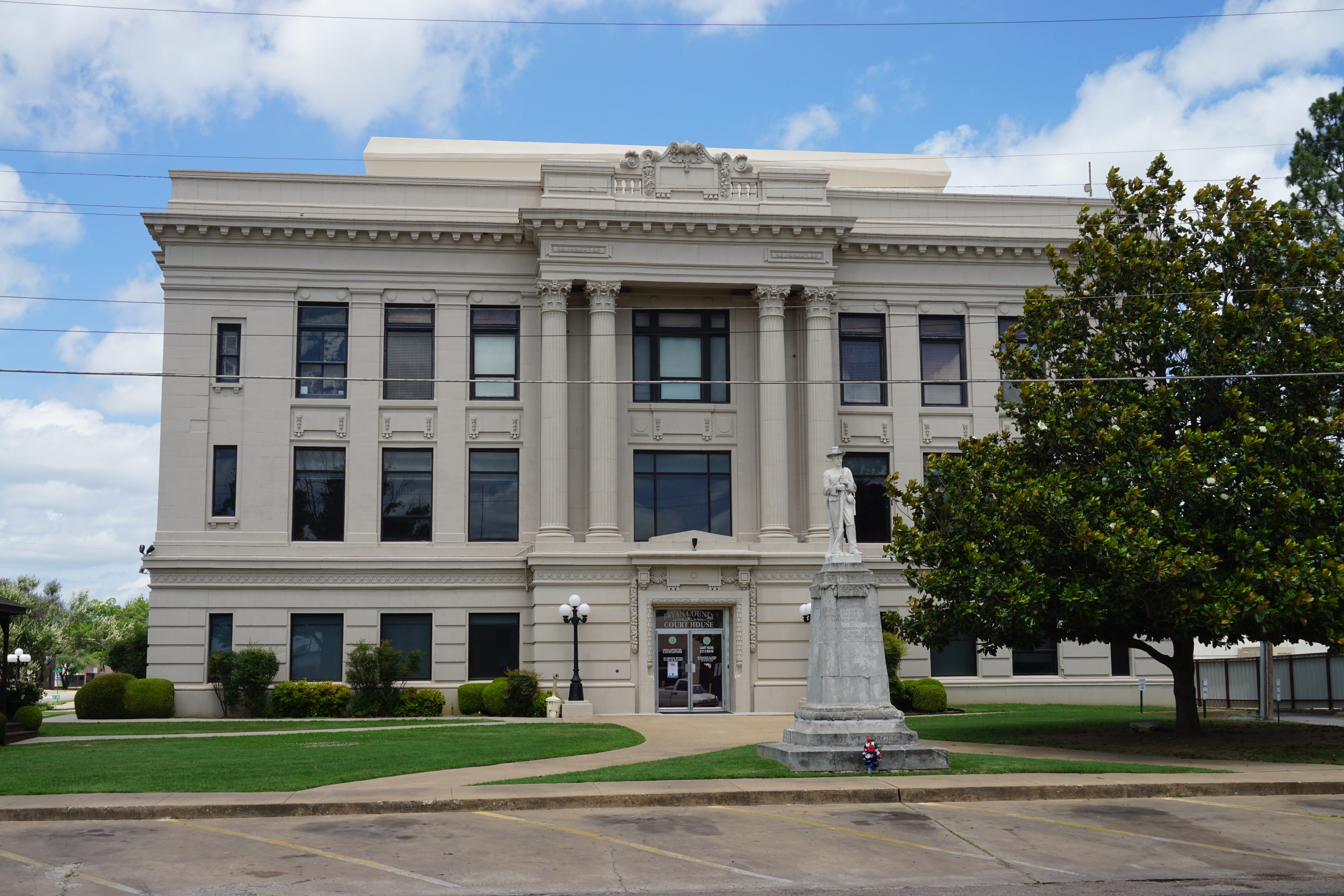
Bryan County Courthouse and Confederate monument

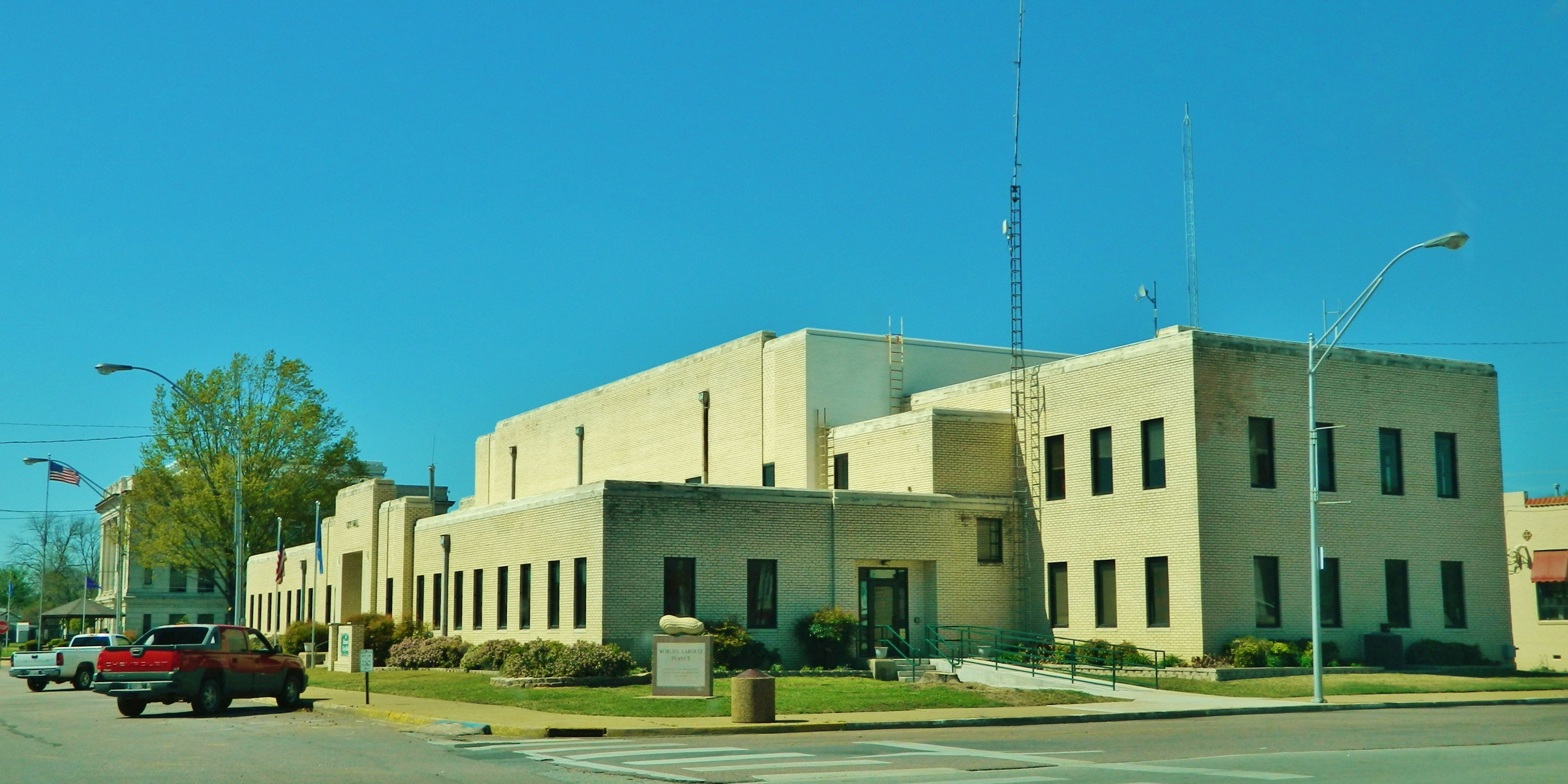
Durant City Hall

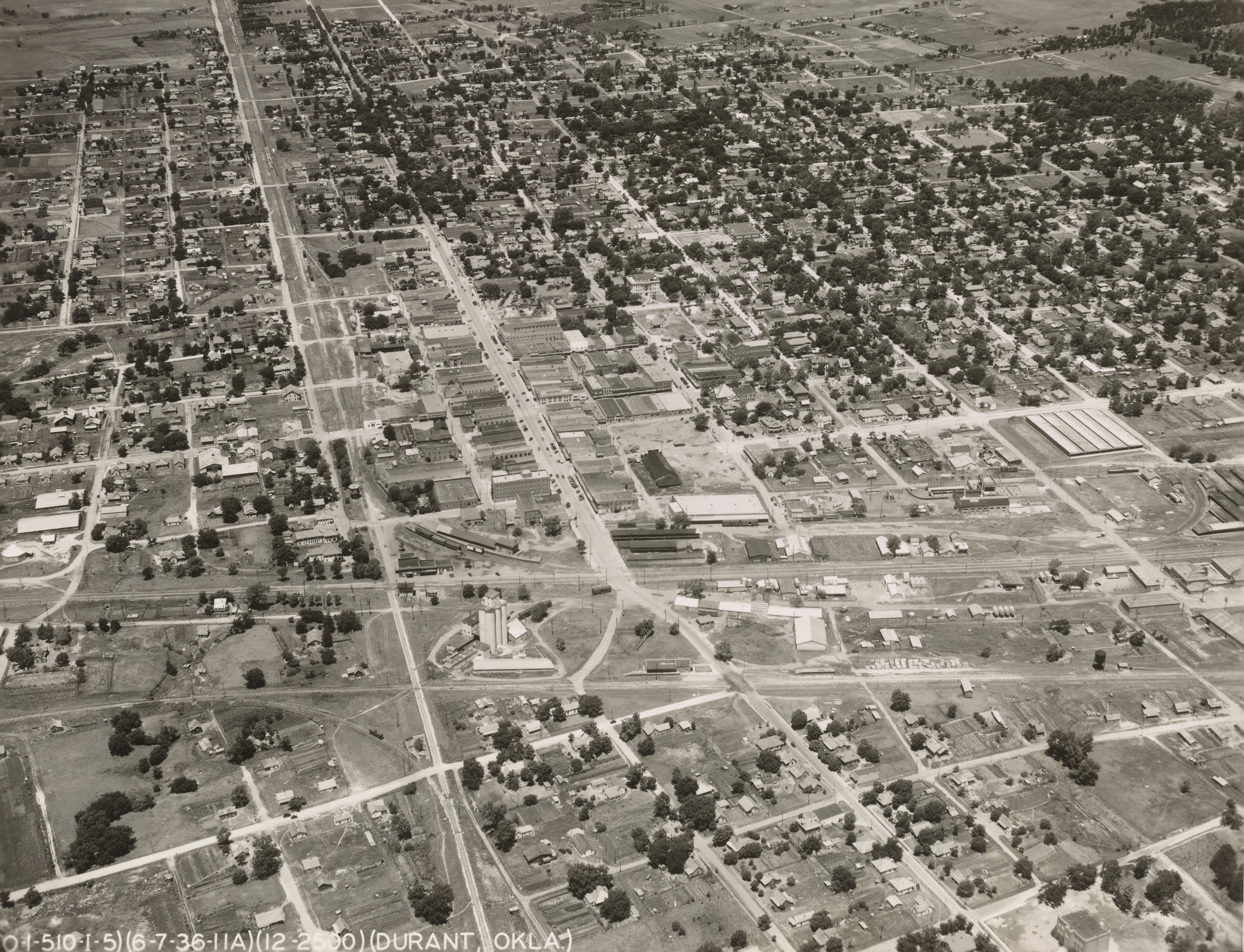
Durant in 1936

The Durant area was once claimed by both Spain and France, before officially becoming part of the United States after the Louisiana Purchase and Adams–Onís Treaty. During the 1820s and 1830s, the area was designated as part of the Choctaw Nation in the southern Indian Territory. During the Indian removals, the Choctaws followed the Choctaw Trail of Tears from their ancestral homeland in Mississippi and Alabama into this area. The Choctaw Nation originally extended from the Mexican border in the west (now part of the Texas Panhandle) to the Arkansas Territory in the east, from the Red River in the south to the South Canadian River in the north. In 1855, the Choctaw and Chickasaws formally divided their land into two separate nations, with Durant remaining in Choctaw territory on the east. Chickasaw land extended west to the boundary that divided the Indian Territory from the Oklahoma Territory after passage of the Oklahoma Organic Act in 1890.

Pierre Durant and his four sons, all of French-Choctaw origin, made the journey up the Trail of Tears on the way to the southeastern part of the Choctaw Nation in 1832. The brothers, grown and with families of their own, established homesteads from the Arkansas line to Durant. One son, Fisher, married to a full-blood Choctaw, found a beautiful location for a home between Durant's present Eighth and Ninth Avenues. At the time of Durant's founding, it was located in Blue County, a part of the Pushmataha District of the Choctaw Nation.

Fisher Durant's son Dixon Durant is recognized as the founder of Durant and is honored as its namesake. A minister, businessman, and civic leader, Dixon Durant is credited with pastorates in local Presbyterian, Congregational, and Methodist churches. He established the first store selling general merchandise in 1873, around the time of the 1872 creation of the Missouri–Kansas–Texas Railroad (Katy Railroad) siding at Durant, which was the initial impetus for establishing the community.

The Missouri-Kansas and Texas Railway (also known as the MKT or "Katy") had already laid a line through the area that would become Durant by November 1882. A wheelless boxcar was parked on the siding there and named "Durant Station". Dixon Durant erected the first building, adjacent to the boxcar, where he opened a general store in 1873. The first post office, also named as Durant Station, Indian Territory, opened February 20, 1879, but closed on July 11, 1881. A.E. Fulsom was postmaster. The U.S. Postal Service re-established the post office at the site as Durant on March 8, 1882, dropping the word "station" from the name. Beginning in 1882, the area was simply called Durant.

W.H. Hilton was elected the first mayor of Durant.

A memorable event in Durant's rail history occurred on April 5, 1905. A special southbound Katy train stopped in the city with President Theodore Roosevelt aboard.

In 1895, a fire destroyed the original business district, which had spread along the Katy tracks.

Calvin Institute was opened in 1894, representing the first institute of higher education in the immediate area, which was an outgrowth of Presbyterian mission work among the Choctaw Indian Nation. Its success led it being reopened as a larger school, Durant Presbyterian College, in 1901, later renamed as Oklahoma Presbyterian College. After statehood became effective on November 16, 1907, the state legislature created the Southeastern State Normal School at Durant, which opened March 6, 1909. This school was renamed Southeastern State Teachers College in 1921, and renamed again in 1974 as the present Southeastern Oklahoma State University.

Further growth of the town was inhibited by its proximity to the larger town of Caddo (also on the Katy line) and the fact that Dixon Durant did not want to sell more of the land he had inherited to non-Indians. From 1902 to 1903, the St. Louis, San Francisco and New Orleans Railroad, an affiliate of the St. Louis and San Francisco Railway (also known as "SL&SF" or "Frisco") had intended to build an east–west line through Caddo, where it would intersect the Katy. A rapid land price increase near Caddo instead caused the Frisco to bypass it in favor of Durant.

In 1904, Durant was named in a grand jury instruction as a sundown town, where a notice had been posted warning African Americans not to stay after dark.

Bryan County was created from Choctaw lands in 1907, the same time as statehood, and was named after William Jennings Bryan, who was nominated three times for President of the United States and at the age of 36 lost to William McKinley. He lost to McKinley again in 1900, and to William H. Taft in 1908. Woodrow Wilson appointed the county's namesake as United States Secretary of State in 1913.

The Oklahoma Constitutional Convention selected Durant as the county seat for Bryan County, Oklahoma, which would supersede Blue County at statehood. In 1908, a special election ratified this choice over three other candidates for the honor: Bokchito, Blue, and Sterrett (later renamed Calera).

The Bryan County Courthouse in downtown Durant was completed in 1917. Before the courthouse stands a Confederate monument, erected in the same year by the United Daughters of the Confederacy.

Eleven people were killed in Durant by a tornado in April 1919.

The town's population grew from 2,969 in 1900 to 5,330 in 1910, 12,823 in 1990, and to 13,549 in 2000.

The Durant Downtown Historic District is listed on the National Register of Historic Places.

=== 1911 lynching ===
John Lee was an African American man who was lynched on August 12, 1911, in Durant, Oklahoma. He was subjected to a brutal act of mob violence, denial of judicial due process, and the desecration of his body posthumously. The event is a reflection of the racial tensions and injustices prevalent in the United States during the early 20th century. The book Without Sanctuary: Lynching Photography in America by Twin Palms Publishers includes a photo from Durant on August 13, 1911, of a group of townspeople burning the body of an African American man named John Lee.

The author of Without Sanctuary summarizes, "According to the August 14 issue of the Durant Daily Democrat, Lee died at 11:15 pm at the hands of a posse of 500. An additional 1,500 citizens were estimated to have been involved in the manhunt. Reports indicate that Lee exchanged gunfire with his would-be captors until his ammunition was spent. The posse "calmly emptied their guns into his body". Lee was accused of a range of crimes, the most serious of which was the critical wounding of a white woman, Mrs. Fanny Campbell. She identified the corpse as that of her assailant. Mrs. Campbell expired later the same day. The mob took John Lee's body to a vacant lot near the railroad tracks, where they built a pyre of gathered lumber and set the remains on fire. It burned from nine in the morning until late in the afternoon. All that remained were ashes and a "few charred parcels". Whites rioted throughout the town of Durant. The city's remaining blacks were warned "not to let the sun go down on them here". All left by sunset. Rumors spread that blacks were organizing to return and avenge Lee's death. Durant's white citizens armed for the coming "race war". In several days, without additional violence, tensions calmed.

== Geography ==
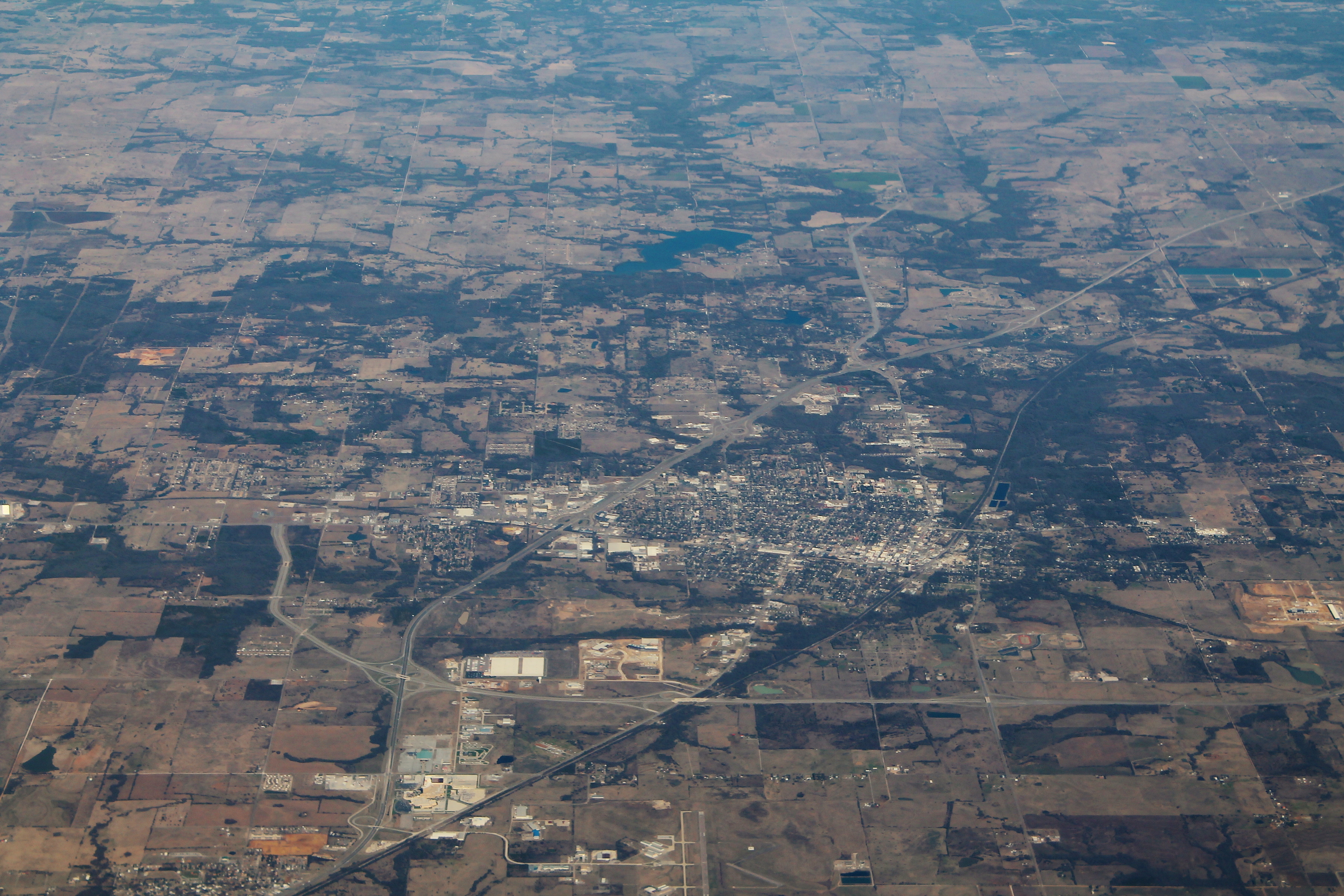
Aerial view of Durant

Durant is located in southeast Oklahoma, in a region named Texoma, or Texomaland, because of its short distance from Lake Texoma. The city is also part of Choctaw Country, formerly Kiamichi Country. Its geographic coordinates are 33°59′59″N 96°23′5″W (33.999834, −96.384825). It is about 14 miles (23 km) north of the Texas border at the Red River. Dallas is about 88 miles (142 km) south of Durant. The north edge of the Dallas–Fort Worth metroplex, in McKinney, is about 58 miles (93 km) to the south.

According to the United States Census Bureau, the city of Durant has a total area of 26.8 square miles (69.3 km^{2}), of which 0.077 sq mi (0.2 km^{2}), or 0.24%, is covered by water.

=== Climate ===
Climate data for Durant, Oklahoma
Month	Jan	Feb	Mar	Apr	May	Jun	Jul	Aug	Sep	Oct	Nov	Dec	Year
Record high °F (°C)	89 (32)	93 (34)	99 (37)	97 (36)	103 (39)	107 (42)	111 (44)	118 (48)	111 (44)	100 (38)	88 (31)	87 (31)	118 (48)
Mean daily maximum °F (°C)	53 (12)	57 (14)	66 (19)	75 (24)	82 (28)	91 (33)	95 (35)	96 (36)	89 (32)	78 (26)	65 (18)	55 (13)	75 (24)
Daily mean °F (°C)	42.1 (5.6)	46.1 (7.8)	54.5 (12.5)	61.7 (16.5)	70.3 (21.3)	78.8 (26.0)	82.6 (28.1)	82.7 (28.2)	74.9 (23.8)	64.2 (17.9)	53.0 (11.7)	44.1 (6.7)	62.9 (17.2)
Mean daily minimum °F (°C)	31 (−1)	34 (1)	42 (6)	51 (11)	59 (15)	68 (20)	71 (22)	70 (21)	63 (17)	52 (11)	41 (5)	33 (1)	51 (11)
Record low °F (°C)	−6 (−21)	−4 (−20)	−7 (−22)	28 (−2)	33 (1)	46 (8)	52 (11)	50 (10)	34 (1)	16 (−9)	9 (−13)	5 (−15)	−6 (−21)
Average precipitation inches (mm)	2.2 (56)	2.7 (69)	2.9 (74)	4.5 (110)	5.4 (140)	3.8 (97)	3.2 (81)	2.8 (71)	3 (76)	3.8 (97)	2.6 (66)	2.6 (66)	39.5 (1,000)
Average snowfall inches (cm)	1.2 (3.0)	0.8 (2.0)	0.3 (0.76)	0 (0)	0 (0)	0 (0)	0 (0)	0 (0)	0 (0)	0 (0)	0 (0)	0.4 (1.0)	2.7 (6.9)
Source 1: NOAA
Source 2: Weatherbase.com

== Demographics ==
Historical population
Census	Pop.	Note	%±
1900	2,969		—
1910	5,330		79.5%
1920	7,340		37.7%
1930	7,463		1.7%
1940	10,027		34.4%
1950	10,541		5.1%
1960	10,467		−0.7%
1970	11,118		6.2%
1980	11,972		7.7%
1990	12,823		7.1%
2000	13,549		5.7%
2010	15,856		17.0%
2020	18,589		17.2%

Durant is the principal city of the Durant micropolitan statistical area, which had a population of 46,067 in 2020. The city and its micropolitan area are a major part of the Texoma region.

Durant is also part of the Dallas–Fort Worth combined statistical area, anchoring the northern edge.

=== 2020 census ===
As of the 2020 census, Durant had a population of 18,589. The median age was 32.1 years; 24.2% of the residents were under 18 and 14.6% were 65 or older. For every 100 females, there were 93.0 males, and for every 100 females 18 and over, there were 91.0 males 18 and over.

About 88.5% of residents lived in urban areas, while 11.5% lived in rural areas.

Of the 7,189 households in Durant, 32.7% had children under 18 living in them, 36.5% were married-couple households, 20.4% were households with a male householder and no spouse or partner present, and 33.8% were households with a female householder and no spouse or partner present. About 30.5% of all households were made up of individuals, and 11.8% had someone living alone who was 65 or older.

The city had 7,887 housing units, of which 8.9% were vacant. Among occupied housing units, 43.0% were owner-occupied and 57.0% were renter-occupied. The homeowner vacancy rate was 1.5% and the rental vacancy rate was 7.0%.

Racial composition as of the 2020 census
Race	Percentage
White	63.1%
Black or African American	2.5%
American Indian and Alaska Native	14.5%
Asian	1.0%
Native Hawaiian and other Pacific Islander	<0.1%
Some other race	4.4%
Two or more races	14.4%
Hispanic or Latino (of any race)	10.3%

=== 2010 census ===
As of the census of 2010, 15,856 people and 3,651 families were residing in the city. The population density was 830 inhabitants per square mile (320/km^{2}), with 7,202 housing units. About 74.7% of the city's population were White, 13.3% were Native American, and 2.2% were Black or African American. Hispanics or Latinos of any race were 7.1% of the population. Individuals of mixed Native American and White heritage accounted for 4.8% of the population. Less than 1% of the population was Asian or Pacific Islander.

=== 2000 census ===
Durant's first census was recorded in 1900, and the population was 2,969. (Note: At the 1890 U.S. census, Durant was considered as "too small to count.") The 2000 census reported Durant's population as 13,549.

Of the 6,331 households in the city, 26.0% had children under 18 living with them, 37.3% were married couples living together, 14.2% had a female householder with no husband present, and 42.3% were not families. Individuals living alone accounted for 32.9% of households and 25.3% had someone living alone who was 65 or older. The average household size was 2.34, and the average family size was 2.96.

In the city, the age distribution was 22.0% under 18, 18.6% from 18 to 24, 24.8% from 25 to 44, 20.4% from 45 to 64, and 14.2% who were 65 or older. The median age was 30.9 years. Females were 51.4% of the population; males were 48.6%.

The median income in the city for a household was $35,135 and for a family was $41,014. Males working full-time had a median income of $34,040 versus $26,197 for female full-time workers. The per capita income for the city was $18,009. About 21% of families and 28% of the population were below the poverty line, including 35% of those under 18 and 14% of those 65 or over.

== Economy ==
Durant was ranked as the fastest-growing rural city in Oklahoma in 2004, outside of the Oklahoma City and Tulsa urban metropolitan areas.

Durant's daytime population increases to around 20,000 people. The city has a pull factor of 1.8–2.1 times its population and was named an All-America City finalist for 2006.

One of the city's strongest industries is tourism; attractions include Lake Texoma, the Choctaw Casino Resort, and Fort Washita. Manufacturing and distribution are growing industries in Durant with several factories being constructed and planned.

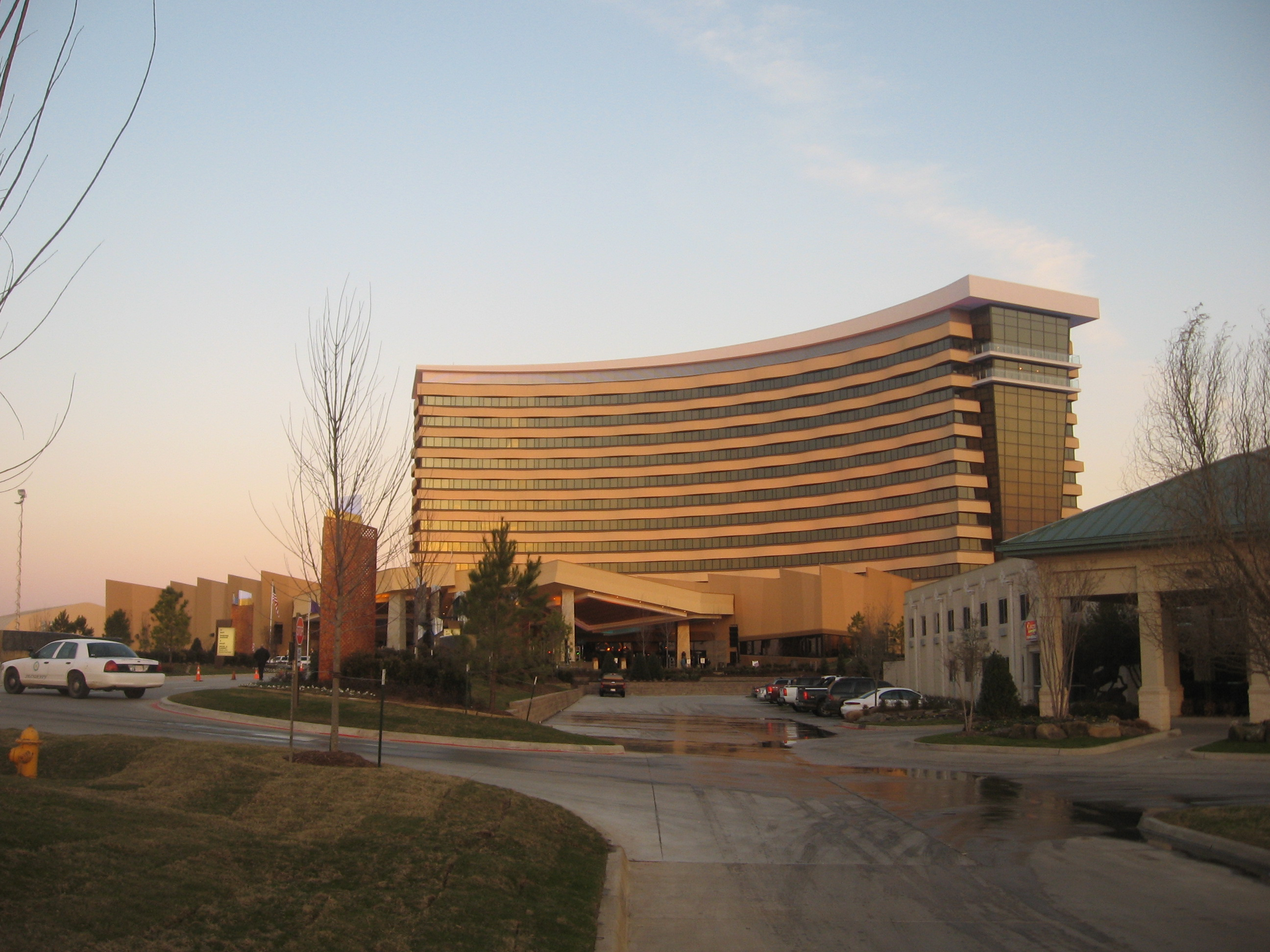
North building of Choctaw Casino Resort

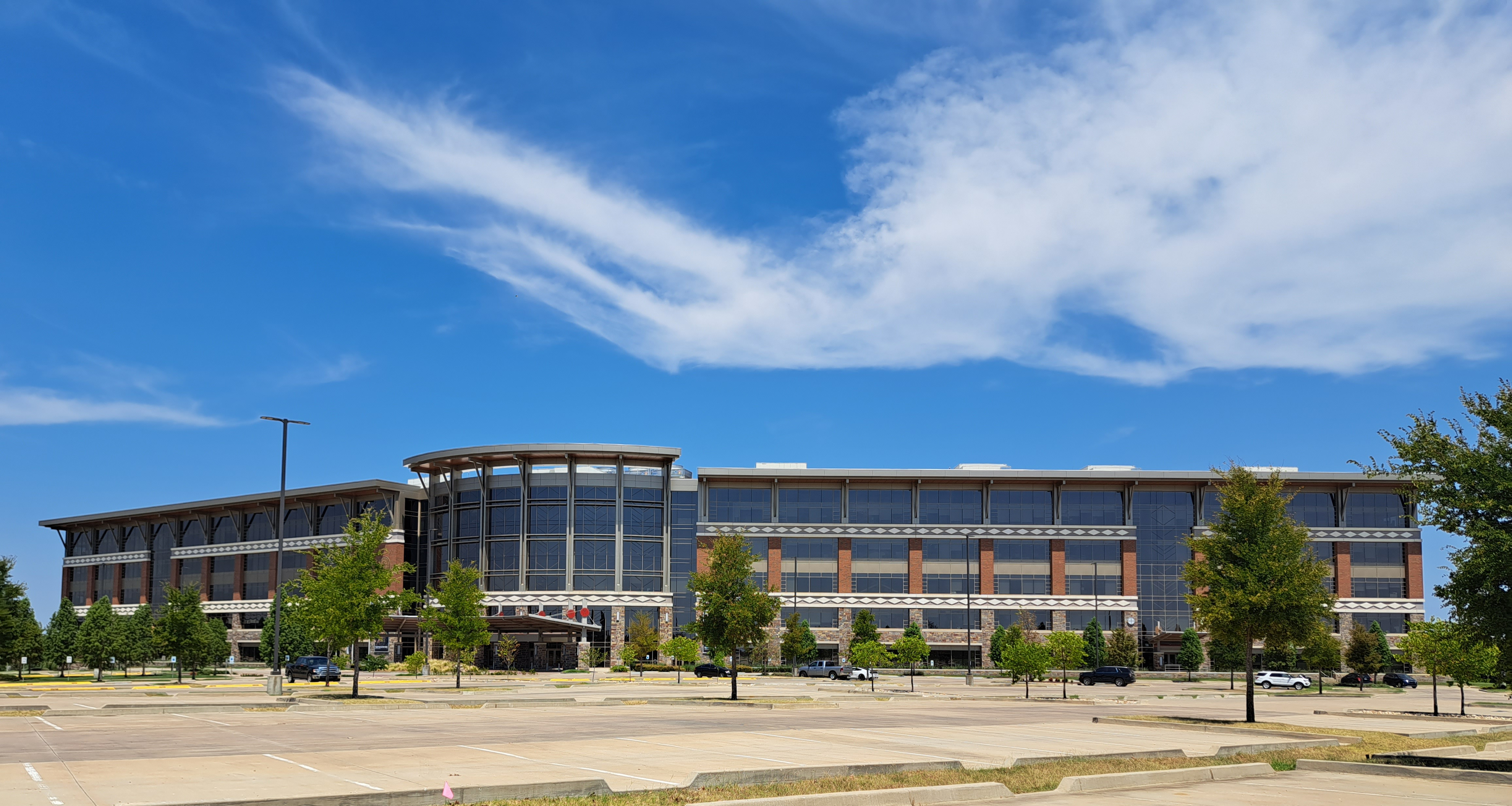
Choctaw Nation Headquarters

The largest employer in Durant is the Choctaw Nation of Oklahoma, including the Choctaw Nation Headquarters and the Choctaw Casino Resort, which has two Choctaw Travel Plazas, two Choctaw casinos, the Choctaw Inn, and more facilities in the resort. Over 5,400 people work for the Choctaw Nation in Durant. Though the capital of the Choctaw Nation is recognized as being Tuskahoma, the administrative offices are located in Durant.

In 1894, Calvin Institute, a school for Native American youths, was established in Durant. By 1899, it had attracted an enrollment of 300. It was renamed Durant Presbyterian College in 1900 and Oklahoma Presbyterian College in 1910. The support for the school came from the Choctaw Nation of Oklahoma, the federal government, and several denominational missionary boards. Because of financial difficulties, the school was closed as a learning institution in the late 1960s. Chief Clark David Gardner established the Choctaw Nation administrative offices at the old Oklahoma Presbyterian College Building in 1975.

In 1976, in cooperation with the Durant Chamber of Commerce and the owners of the buildings, the Red River Valley Historical Association, title was transferred to the federal government. Ceremonies were held August 17, 1976, commemorating the title transfer. Reacquisition of this building allowed centralization of government, which permits more effective use of personnel in administering current programs and developing future programs. The building has been renovated, and administration of many Choctaw programs are headquartered there.

Another important part of Durant's economy is the city's historic central business and retail district. In the past few years, downtown Durant has seen growth, renewal projects such as streetscaping, and new businesses arriving. Durant has a Main Street program. The retail district is west of downtown, at the intersection of U.S. 69/75 and U.S. 70, and is Durant's fastest growing area.

Cardinal Glass Industries has a float glass manufacturing facility in western Durant. It became operational in 2004 and became the fourth glass plant for Cardinal Glass Industries.

Big Lots has a 1,200,000 sq ft (110,000 m^{2}). distribution center in Durant that began operating in January 2004.

Durant is home to the headquarters of First United Bank, one of the largest privately owned banks in the United States, and First Texoma National Bank. Indian Nation Wholesale, also headquartered in Durant, was the 15th largest wholesaler in the United States as of 2008.

== Arts and culture ==
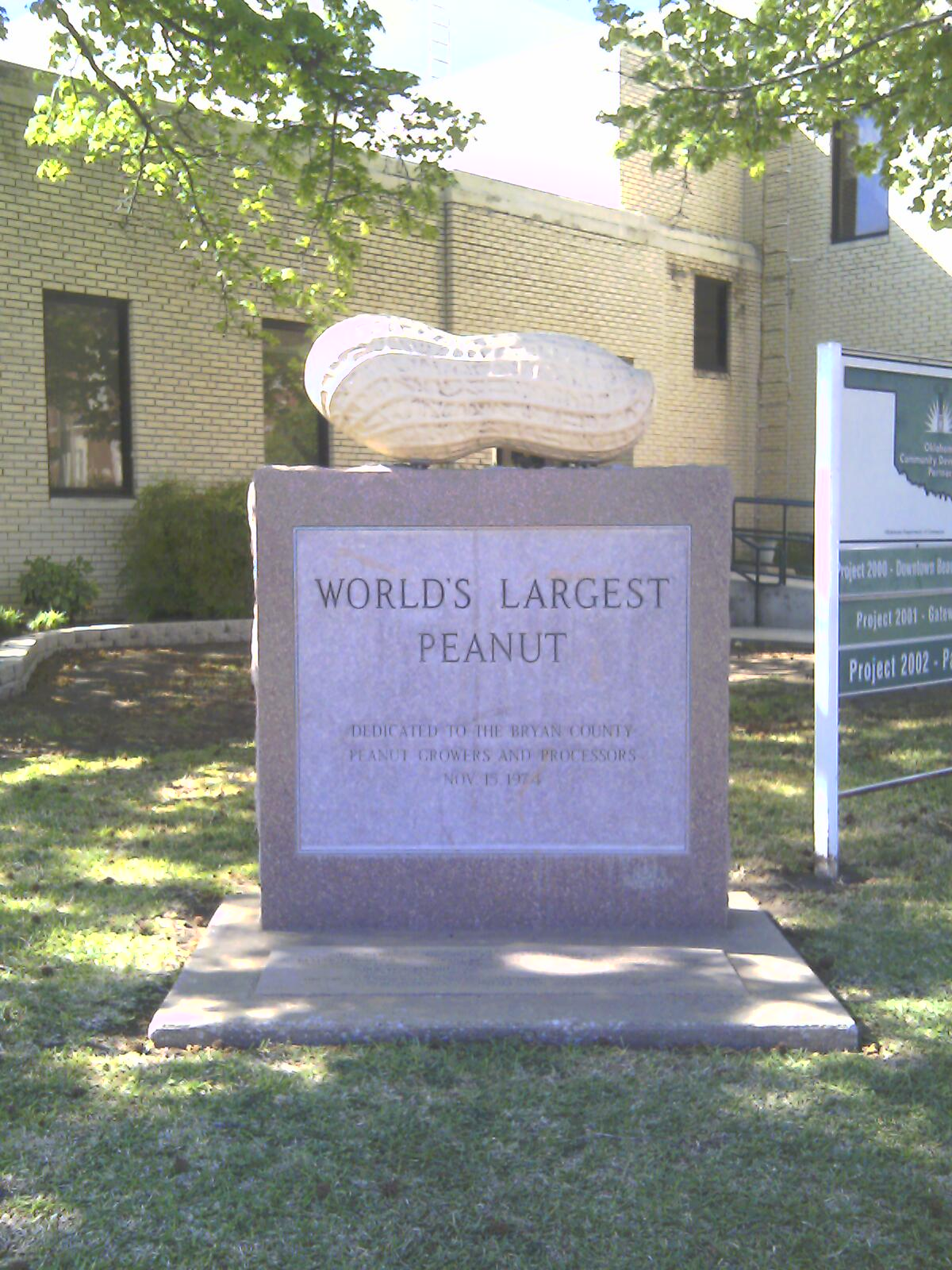
The large peanut in Durant

The Oklahoma Legislature proclaimed Durant as the "Magnolia Capital of the World" in 1993. Every year since, the town has celebrated a Magnolia Festival during the weekend following Memorial Day.The festival is put on by the Durant Chamber of Commerce and Durant Main Street Program; it features music, shopping, shows, and two pageants – the Magnolia Pageant and the Choctaw Princess Pageant.

Durant has a "World's Largest Peanut" monument, a title it shares with two other monuments in Texas and Ashburn, Georgia. This monument to the peanut growers in Bryan County is located on the front lawn of Durant's city hall. Dedicated in 1973, it includes a time capsule that contains historic and legal documents, which was unearthed in 2023.

The Three Valley Museum houses historical artifacts of Bryan County. Opened in 1976, it is named for a book about Durant, Queen of the Three Valleys, by Henry McCreary, which references the city's location in the middle of the Red, Blue River, and Washita River valleys. The museum's exhibits include an early law office, doctor's office, child's room, parlor, and general store.

The Oklahoma Shakespearean Festival is housed on the campus of Southeastern Oklahoma State University. Oklahoma Shakespearean Festival is one of the top summer theatre festivals in America. It has made Durant and Southeastern Oklahoma State University a destination for tourists, professional and aspiring actors and theatre artisans.

== Sports ==
Although no major sports team is located in Durant, many sporting opportunities are found in the city, including the Durant Multi-Sports Complex, golf, soccer pitches, and baseball fields.

The Durant Multi-Sports Complex athletic facility is located 2 mi (3.2 km) southeast of Durant, on Highway 78. Dedicated on November 17, 2006, it sits on 80 acres (32 ha), with 100 acres (40 ha) undeveloped. It has of baseball and softball fields, soccer pitches, and a football stadium/track field. A 17-acre (69,000 m^{2}) lake is under construction, and a walking and biking trail is planned to be built around the lake. The cost of the complex was $7 million.

=== College athletics ===
Southeastern Oklahoma State University competes in NCAA Division II in the Great American Conference. The Savage Storm compete in these sports - baseball, men's and women's basketball, football, men's and women's tennis, men's golf, rodeo, women's cross-country running, softball, women's track and field, and women's volleyball. In 2000, the baseball team won the Division II college world series.

== Parks and recreation ==
The City of Durant maintains and operates 11 parks totaling more than 251 acres (1.02 km^{2}). They include:

- Durant Multi-Sports Complex
- Dixon Durant Park – formerly Northside Park, or Rocket Park, renamed in honor of the founder of Durant.
- Carl Albert Memorial Park and public pool
- Billy Miller Park
- Schuler Park
- Lake Durant

Less than 15 miles (24 km) away, Lake Texoma has 8–10 million visitors every year and is the 12th-largest lake in the United States, contributing to Durant's economic and population growth.

== Government ==
Durant is governed by a council-manager form of municipal government. The city manager is the administrative leader of the government and is appointed by the city council. The city's ceremonial head is the mayor, who is a voting member of the council with limited administrative power.

The current interim city manager is Rick Rumsey, who replaced Lisa Taylor in a council vote. The current mayor is Martin Tucker. The city is divided into four wards with a member of the city council from each, with also an at-large city council member. The current mayor also represents Ward 1.

Durant sits within the 9th council district of the Choctaw Nation, and is represented by Republican James Dry, first elected in 2017.

== Education ==
=== Higher ===
Durant is home to Southeastern Oklahoma State University, which has about 5,200 enrolled students. It is the only university in Oklahoma to offer a master of science in aviation and space. The university offers degrees through its Aviation Sciences Institute, the largest aviation program in the state. The main campus in Durant has facilities at the airport to support flight training and facilities on campus for management options in business, maintenance, safety, and security. The institute offers the undergraduate management degrees and the master of science degree in aerospace administration and logistics.

Southeastern Oklahoma State University also offers a doctoral degree (DBA) in business administration.

=== Career and technical ===
Durant is home to the Kiamichi Technology Center, which has eight other locations in southeastern Oklahoma. Kiamichi is part of the Oklahoma Department of Career and Technology Education.

=== Elementary and secondary ===
The Durant Independent School District is the largest school district in southeastern Oklahoma and served roughly 3,100 students in 2010. The district includes six schools for preschool, primary, and secondary education.

The region is also home to the Silo School District, which includes three schools and served around 680 students in 2010, and to one of two schools in the Rock Creek School District.

The city has a private K-12 school, Victory Life Academy, which has an enrollment of about 250 students.

== Media ==
Durant is served by a newspaper, the Durant Democrat, formerly the Durant Daily Democrat, which publishes on Tuesday, Thursday, and Saturday. The Democrat was purchased by Graystone Media Group LLC of local businessmen in 2018. Graystone Media has also started monthly publications in Kingston and Calera, Oklahoma. No television studios are located in the city, but it receives over the air reception from the Sherman-Ada DMA, which has studios in Sherman and Denison, Texas, with branch studios in Ardmore, Oklahoma. The city has an independent cable television and Internet provider called Vyve. On August 26, 2016, Ryan Nazari, an Oklahoma City Thunder fan, created a petition to change the city's name to "Westbrook" because Kevin Durant left the team for the Golden State Warriors; the petition received 1,999 supporters.

The city receives these stations:

- KTEN Channel 10 – (NBC)
- KTEN DT Channel 10.2 – (The CW Texoma)
- KXII Channel 12 – (CBS)
- KXII DT Channel 12.2 (My Texoma)
- KXII DT Channel 12.3 (Fox Texoma)
- A low-power translator of OETA and its subchannels

Public-access television cable stations include:

- Durant Public Schools 24-hour station which usually only airs slide shows
- A local classified advertisements with KLBC playing
- Duane Sheriff Ministries
- FBC-TV, which relays FamilyNet and Worship when local churches are not broadcasting
- A NEXRAD station

The city receives these radio stations:

- KSEO, AM 750/FM 94.1, Oldies/Classic Hits
- KLBC, 106.3 FM, "Today's Best Country"
- KBBC. 99.7, "The Buzz" – Hot AC
- KSSU, "POWER 92", a Southeastern Oklahoma State station aimed at college students
- KZRC, 96.1 "Mix 96" – Hot AC, the home Southeastern Oklahoma State Athletics, Pottsboro Cardinal Football, and Kingston Athletics. Won OAB "Best Video Broadcast Award" 2020 for Southeastern Oklahoma State Football Broadcast.

== Infrastructure ==
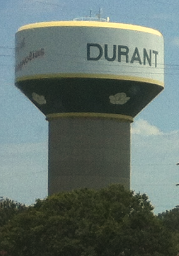
Durant water tower

=== Roads and highways ===
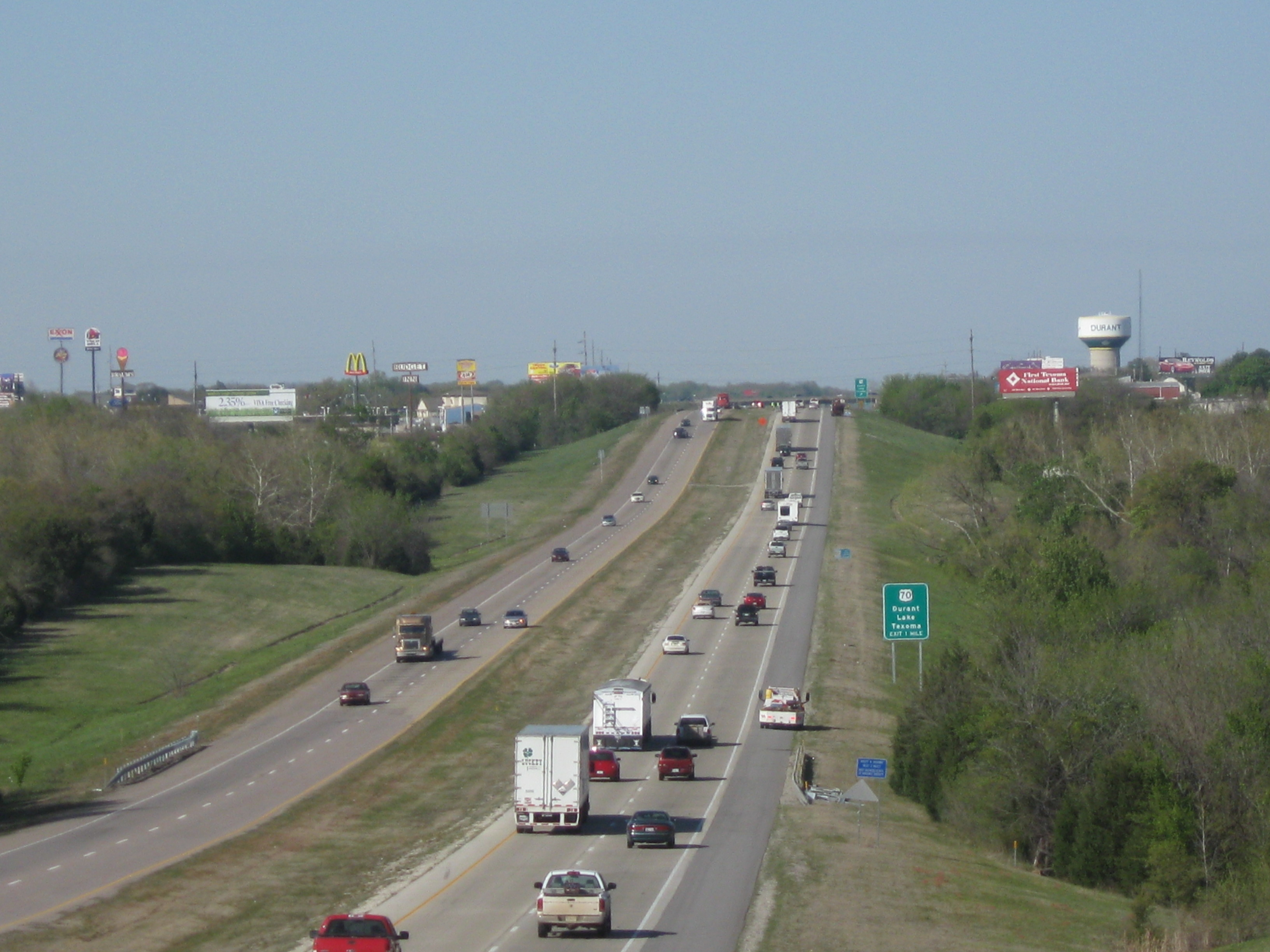
Northbound Highway 69/75 in Durant

US 69/US 75 is a north-south four-lane divided highway and freeway. US 69/75 enters Oklahoma as a freeway from the Dallas area, then downgrades to a divided four-lane highway just north of Colbert. The highway then enters Durant from the south. After its at-grade intersection with Choctaw Road, it again upgrades to a freeway, passing through western and northern Durant, and again downgrades to a four-lane divided highway at the Bryan-Atoka County line.

US 70, an east–west route, 70 enters Durant from the east as a two-lane highway as Mulberry Street, crossing a Union Pacific railroad via a bridge. It then heads southward toward downtown on First Avenue as a three-lane, concurrent with SH 78 and Business Routes 69/75. Downtown, it has an intersection with Main Street, then continues its route westward on West Main Street concurrent with Business Routes 69/75. Just west of downtown, it turns into a three-lane street, and after its intersection with 9th Avenue, it converts into a five-lane street. At Washington Avenue, it reduces to a two-lane again while it travels through West End Heights, a historic and upscale neighborhood. At 21st Avenue, it turns into a divided four-lane highway in the Retail District, intersecting with 69/75 as a parclo interchange. Highway 70 continues westward toward Mead and Lake Texoma as a five-lane highway.

SH 78, a north–south route, enters Durant from the south as Southeast 3rd Avenue as a two-lane. It comes to an intersection with East Main Street and turns westward toward downtown, continuing its route. At the intersection of Main and First Avenue, the highway turns northward onto First Avenue as a three-lane street, concurrent with Highway 70 and Business Routes 69/75. It continues northward to University Boulevard and turns into a two-lane highway. Just before its intersection with 69/75 (via ramps), SH 78 turns into a divided, four-lane highway for a short time and then returns into a two-lane highway exiting the city.

Intercity bus service is provided by Greyhound Lines.

In a 2006 study by the Oklahoma Department of Transportation, an average of about 19,100 vehicles pass Durant's Main Street on U.S. 69/75 every day.

=== Airports ===
Durant Regional Airport – Eaker Field, the city's airport and home to Southeastern Oklahoma State University's Aviation Sciences Institute, was a U.S. Navy auxiliary airfield during World War II. It is named after U.S. Army Air Force General Ira C. Eaker, early commander of the legendary Eighth Air Force in wartime England, who graduated from the university (then known as Southeastern State Teacher's College) in 1917.

The closest international airports to Durant are Dallas/Fort Worth International Airport and Will Rogers World Airport in Oklahoma City.

=== Rail ===
Durant is a major railroad center. The giant Union Pacific Railroad and the short-line Kiamichi Railroad intersect in downtown.

=== Utilities ===
Durant is served by a city-owned water plant and sewage treatment center. Residents receive electricity from OG&E and Southeastern Electric Co-op.

=== Healthcare ===
Durant is served by AllianceHealth Durant, which was formerly the Medical Center of Southeastern Oklahoma. Built in 1987, the medical center replaced the Bryan Memorial Hospital.

Emergency Medical Services are provided by Bryan County EMS.

== Notable people ==
- Henry G. Bennett, longest-serving president of Oklahoma State University.
- David Bullard, Oklahoma state senator, attended Southeastern Oklahoma State University
- Brett Butler, professional baseball player, attended Southeastern Oklahoma State University
- Mike Christian, state representative, attended University of Oklahoma
- Joe Dobson, Major League Baseball pitcher, 1948 American League All-Star, inducted in Boston Red Sox Hall of Fame
- Gail Farrell, cast member of The Lawrence Welk Show; Gail Farrell Drive, avenue located on the far north side of the city, was named in her honor in the mid-1970s.
- Ralph Faudree, mathematician and provost of the University of Memphis
- Billie Letts, author
- Tracy Letts, playwright and actor
- Reba McEntire, recording artist, Grammy Award-winning singer and actress, attended Southeastern Oklahoma State University
- Kirby Minter, retired basketball player, played for Team USA in 1954 FIBA World Championship in Rio de Janeiro
- Dennis Rodman, professional basketball player, attended Southeastern Oklahoma State University
- Uldine Utley, a child preacher born in Durant, who at age 14, ministered to a crowd of 14,000 people at Madison Square Garden.
- Robert L. Williams, first chief justice of the Oklahoma Supreme Court, third governor of Oklahoma, U.S. district and appellate judge

== Popular culture references ==
- On the Road with Austin & Santino – Durant was prominently featured in the 2010 episode "Wedding Knots", as the two designers created a wedding dress for a local woman. Local businesses visited include the Choctaw Casino Resort, Bliss Boutique, and Doylene's Fabric Outlet.
- Criminal Minds – In the 2011 episode "Proof", the team of investigators was led to a case in Durant involving two young women who were found murdered and sexually assaulted. While set in Durant, the production never actually filmed any material there. Many locals were critical of the show and its unrealistic portrayal of the city.
- Bonnie & Clyde – In this 2013 miniseries, Durant is referenced in a newspaper article that appears on screen. It reads, "Barrow Gang spotted in Durant, Oklahoma", with a subheadline reading, "Three Businesses Robbed at Gunpoint. Outlaws wanted in Multiple States." True to the miniseries' inspiration, this was based upon true events.
- The Small Business Revolution - Durant saw an exciting end to 2018 and subsequent beginning to 2019 with a spot in competition to be the location for filming of season four of The Small Business Revolution, a television show produced by Deluxe Corporation for distribution on Hulu and YouTube. The town applied to be considered in August 2018. The announcement was made in November that Durant was included as a finalist in a list of Top 20. The following month, Durant made the top 10. In January, the producers, along with host, Amanda Brinkman, visited the community for a welcome rally and to visit with small business owners who had applied to appear on the show, should Durant win the competition. In a live web announcement on February 12, Brinkman, along with co-host Ty Pennington, announced that there had been a slight change in the competition, with 6 finalists, rather than 5, proceeding to the final weeklong public vote. As a part of the campaign for votes, Durant garnered shout outs from Reba McEntire, Blake Shelton, and Barry Switzer, among others. During the weeklong public vote, the show made three announcements as to where the votes stood, with Durant in first place as of the final update. At the conclusion of voting, with a week to go before the announcement of the winning town, Durant went to work planning for the #MyDurant party, where Brinkman would appear if Durant should win. Ultimately, Searcy, Arkansas was announced as the winner. The competition gave the city a boost in morale and saw the city work together toward the goal of winning the show. Despite it all, Durant was featured in several blogs published by the production.

== Other distinctions ==
Durant has had the honor to be recognized on a national scale on various occasions, regarding famous visitations or other attention. An example of this is:

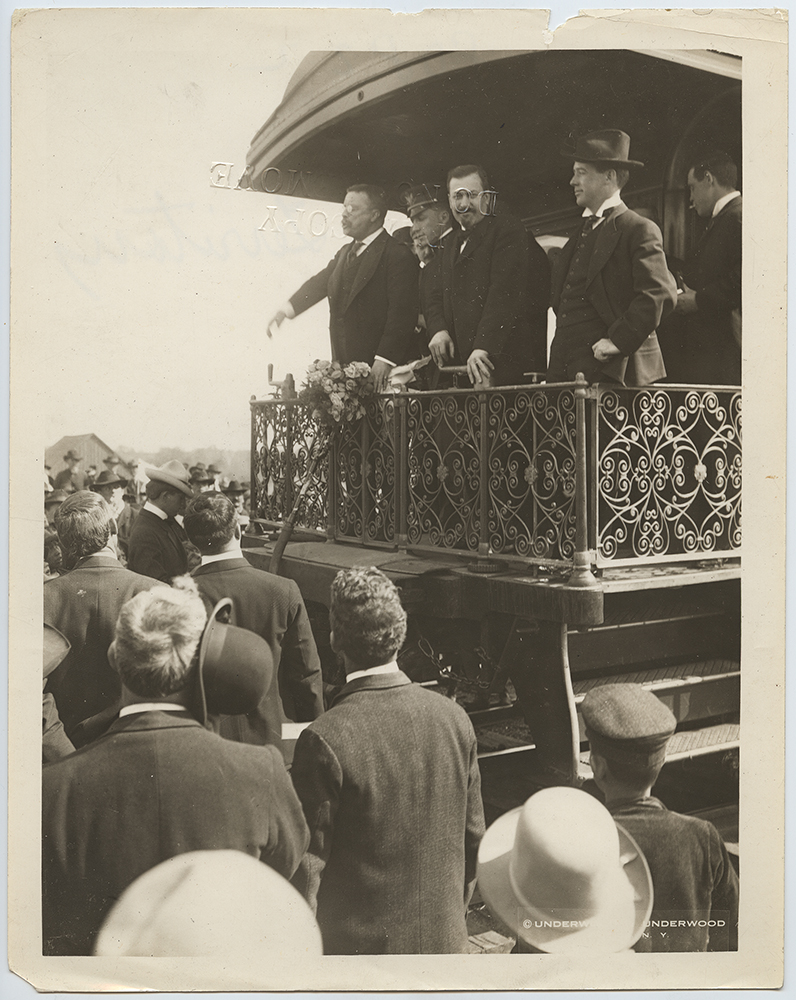
President Theodore Roosevelt addressed the community from the back of his train car on April 5, 1905.

- On April 5, 1905, President Theodore Roosevelt arrived in Durant on a train and gave a speech using the rear of the train as his platform. He later revisited the community in 1910, staying in the downtown Bryan Hotel, while on a hunting trip in the area.
- First Lady Eleanor Roosevelt visited the community, speaking on March 20, 1937, for Senior Day at then-Southeastern Teachers College. She spoke at the invitation of the president of the college, Kate Galt Zaneis. Mrs. Roosevelt noted in her diary, "I spoke to a packed auditorium of young people, who proved to be a remarkably good audience." As Mrs. Roosevelt stepped up to speak, the orchestra played "Let Me Call You Sweetheart". Mrs. Zaneis said the song was chosen because Mrs. Roosevelt was loved so much. Mrs. Roosevelt received around 2300 people that afternoon. She notes "I rarely do this, but it is also rare for a woman to be a president of a college where there are both men and women students." She also wrote that upon boarding the train to leave town, some of the students waiting at the depot assisted her in loading fifty-four boxes of flowers as gifts to her onto the train.
- In 1953, actor José Ferrer and actress/singer Rosemary Clooney were married in Durant while Jose was performing in the musical Kiss Me, Kate in Dallas.
- According to papers from the FBI released during the drop of Kennedy documents released in 2017, Jack Ruby went to Durant to look at purchasing a motel just north of town in 1960. He was accompanied by Roy Kimes and Joe Russell Wyatt to area, dropping off Wyatt in Colbert and subsequently picking him up on the way back to Farmersville.
- On June 2, 1965, less than two years after her former husband was believed to have shot President John F. Kennedy (and was subsequently shot himself), Marina Oswald and fiancé Kenneth Porter came to Durant to get married due to the blood-testing laws of the time. They arrived early in the day to take the blood tests, but were told to return at 2:00 pm for the results. They ate lunch and drove out to Lake Texoma to pass time. When 2:00 pm came around, the media had caught up to them and they fled to Sherman, Texas, to avoid the attention. They were eventually married that evening in Fate, Texas.
- On July 15, 2015, President Barack Obama visited the city to address the nation from Durant High School on his "Promised Zone" initiative. In 2014, the President designated five areas in the United States as Promised Zones, including the Choctaw Nation of Oklahoma. The other areas designated were Los Angeles, Philadelphia, San Antonio, and Southeastern Kentucky. The initiative was "designed to create jobs and increase economic security by partnering local communities with business." While speaking, he also introduced his ConnectHome initiative, which is designed to open up greater access to the internet for low income households.
- In August 2016, Durant found itself at the unlikely center of controversy after an online petition was created by a citizen of Edmond, Oklahoma, Ryan Nazari, suggesting that Durant should be forced to change its name to Westbrook in honor of Russell Westbrook, after Kevin Durant's unpopular departure from the Oklahoma City Thunder. "Ladies and gentleman, the great state of Oklahoma has been betrayed...It is because of this heinous action that I believe the State of Oklahoma has a responsibility to change the name of the City of Durant to Westbrook, the man who is loyal, whom we believe in, and who will lead our team to glory. Yes, it is understood that the city Durant was not named after the evil Kevin Durant, but it is just another hideous reminder of what happened," Nazari's petition read. Neither the creator of the petition, nor Kevin Durant had ever visited the community. The news surrounding the petition led to an article by ESPN and later by The New York Times.
- In December 2016, Durant gained national attention again. People published a light-hearted article regarding the Durant Fire Department's annual Christmas Card. The department had experienced the birth of six babies during the year and decided to feature them in their annual Christmas card. "If you ask many of the fire fighters in Durant, OK, what defines them; they will say brotherhood and family. That is why when this small paid department of 33 looked back on the year and saw that 6 of their brothers had newborn babies, it was time to show the public what was at the core of their department."

== See also ==
- List of sundown towns in the United States
