= MCSO =

MCSO may refer to:

== Law enforcement ==
- Maricopa County Sheriff's Office, Arizona
- Mecklenburg County Sheriff’s Office (Virginia)
- Monroe County Sheriff's Office (New York)
- Montgomery County Sheriff's Office (Maryland)
- Multnomah County Sheriff's Office, Oregon

== Other ==
- Medical Center of Southeastern Oklahoma
