= Prime Broadcasting Network =

Filipino radio network

- Type: Private
- Industry: Broadcast Radio network
- Founded: 1995
- Headquarters: Digos, Davao del Sur, Philippines
- Key people: Edgar L. Delibo
- Parent: Dok Alternatibo Brotherhood with Inventors Guild Consumers Cooperative

Prime Broadcasting Network is a broadcast radio network in the Philippines. It operates a number of stations across the country, mostly under the Prime FM brand, as well as the flagship syndicated health and wellness program Dok Alternatibo, which is also heard as a blocktimer on several non-PBN stations.

== PBN stations ==
=== Prime FM ===
Brand	Callsign	Frequency	Location
Prime FM Digos	DXDI	106.3 MHz	Digos
Prime FM Tagum (Note: Affiliated with Far East Broadcasting Network Corporation.)	DXCG	102.3 MHz	Tagum
Prime FM Mati	DXDH	98.3 MHz	Mati
Prime FM Baganga	DXPO	88.5 MHz	Baganga
Prime FM Surallah	DXPD	89.7 MHz	Surallah
Prime FM Cotabato	DXEO	107.7 MHz	Cotabato City
Prime FM Kidapawan	DXEI	104.7 MHz	Kidapawan
Prime FM Valencia	DXDK	94.5 MHz	Valencia
Prime FM Maramag	DXMF	104.7 MHz	Maramag
Prime FM Surigao	DXAF	102.3 MHz	Surigao City
Prime FM Bislig	DXBF	101.7 MHz	Bislig
Prime FM Tandag	DXDS	102.3 MHz	Tandag
Prime FM Gingoog	DXPT	101.7 MHz	Gingoog
Prime FM Canlaon	DYPB	105.3 MHz	Canlaon
Prime FM Ormoc	DYOD	106.3 MHz	Ormoc

=== MRGV FM ===
Brand	Callsign	Frequency	Location
MRGV FM Toledo	DYDT	107.9 MHz	Toledo
MRGV FM Bayawan	—N/a	100.1 MHz	Bayawan
MRGV FM Bais	DYDB	88.9 MHz	Bais
