= DXBF =

Philippine radio station

Prime FM Bislig (DXBF)
Bislig; Philippines
- Broadcast area: Southern Caraga and surrounding areas
- Frequency: 101.7 MHz
- Branding: 101.7 Prime FM

Programming
- Languages: Cebuano, Filipino
- Format: Contemporary MOR, News, talk
- Network: DABIG C Radio

Ownership
- Owner: Prime Broadcasting Network

History
- First air date: 2014
- Call sign meaning: Bislig Prime FM

Technical information
- Licensing authority: NTC
- Power: 5,000 Watts

DXBF (101.7 FM), broadcasting as 101.7 Prime FM, is a radio station owned and operated by Prime Broadcasting Network. Its studios and transmitters are located at Brgy. Mangagoy, Bislig.
