= DXEI =

Prime FM Kidapawan (DXEI)
- Kidapawan; Philippines
- Broadcast area: Eastern Cotabato and surrounding areas
- Frequency: 104.7 MHz
- Branding: 104.7 Prime FM

Programming
- Languages: Cebuano, Filipino
- Format: Contemporary MOR, News, Talk
- Network: Prime FM

Ownership
- Owner: Prime Broadcasting Network

History
- First air date: 2017
- Former names: DABIG C Radio (2020-2021); Radyo Alternatibo (2021-2025)

Technical information
- Licensing authority: NTC
- Power: 5 kW

104.7 Prime FM (DXEI 104.7 MHz) is an FM station owned and operated by Prime Broadcasting Network. Its studios and transmitter are located in Kidapawan.
