= XHIS-FM =

- Ciudad Guzmán, Jalisco; Mexico
- Frequency: 106.3 FM
- Branding: La Rancherita

Programming
- Format: Regional Mexican

Ownership
- Owner: Grupo Radiofónico Zer; (Radio Sistema del Pacífico, S.A. de C.V.)

History
- First air date: June 25, 1965

Technical information
- Licensing authority: CRT
- Class: B1
- ERP: 10 kW
- HAAT: 259.8 m (852 ft)
- Transmitter coordinates: 19°39′52.03″N 103°27′40.7″W
- Repeaters: XHPTAM-FM 88.9 (Tamazula) (3 kW ERP, 97.4 m HAAT)

Links
- Website: grupozer.mx/portada.php?id=400

XHIS-FM is a radio station on 106.3 FM in Ciudad Guzmán, Jalisco. It is known as La Rancherita with a Regional Mexican format and is owned and operated by Grupo Radiofónico Zer. The station is simulcast on Zer-owned XHPTAM-FM 88.9 in Tamazula, which was won in the IFT-4 radio station auction of 2017.

== History ==
XEIS-AM 670 received its concession on December 9, 1963 and signed on June 25, 1965. The 1 kW daytimer was sold to Radio Sistema del Pacífico by the end of the 1960s.

It was authorized to migrate to FM in 2011, and in 2018, the transmitter was relocated to Cerro La Escalera.

In 2016, ownership of Radio Sistema del Pacífico, which had been held by Guadalajara-based Unidifusión, was transferred entirely to Rodrigo Rodríguez Reyes and Josefina Reyes Sahagún, marking the definitive acquisition of XHIS-FM by Grupo Radiofónico ZER.
