= XHRVI-FM =

Radio station in Ixtacomitán–Villahermosa, Tabasco, Mexico

- Ixtacomitán–Villahermosa, Tabasco; Mexico
- Broadcast area: Villahermosa
- Frequency: 106.3 MHz

Programming
- Format: Rock/Adult contemporany

Ownership
- Owner: Capital Media; (Radiodifusoras Capital, S.A. de C.V.)

History
- First air date: April 13, 1992 (concession); 2011 (FM)
- Former frequencies: 1190 kHz, 700 kHz
- Call sign meaning: Radio Villa, Ixtacomitán (I added during AM-FM migration)

Technical information
- ERP: 25 kW
- Transmitter coordinates: 17°55′48″N 92°58′43″W

XHRVI-FM is a radio station on 106.3 FM in Villahermosa, Tabasco, Mexico, with transmitter in Ixtacomitán. XHRVI-FM is owned by Capital Media.

== History ==
XERV-AM received its concession on April 13, 1992. The Villahermosa-based XERV was owned by Erasto Huerta Mendoza and known as "Radio Villa", it broadcast with up to 10,000 watts daytime (although it only ever used 2,500) and 500 watts at night on 1190 kHz, later 700 kHz. Radio Villa acquired XERV in 2000, and Capital bought the station in 2005.

XERV was approved to migrate to FM on June 4, 2010, and signed on the next year as XHRVI-FM 106.3. To not conflict with the existing XHRV-FM, an I was added for Ixtacomitán, where the transmitter is located. Upon migration, the station changed names to "Yo FM" with a pop format. The next year, it changed to Radio Capital and then to the Capital FM pop format in 2015.

On August 13, 2019, XHRVI flipped to grupera as Capital Máxima. On October 1, the station changed formats again, to news/talk as Heraldo Radio. This ended on March 1, 2021, with Capital Media resuming direct operation and programming an adult hits format known as Lokura FM.

On May 1, 2023, the station was leased locally to new operators who relaunched the station as grupera "Titán FM". On June 9, 2026, Capital regains control of XHRVI.
