= XHHDH-FM =

Community radio station in Santa María Huatulco, Oaxaca

Santa María Huatulco, Oaxaca; Mexico
- Frequency: 106.3 FM
- Branding: Radio Mar

Programming
- Format: Community radio

Ownership
- Owner: Haciendo Efectivos los Derechos Humanos, A.C.

History
- First air date: 2018
- Call sign meaning: Haciendo Efectivos los Derechos Humanos, A.C.

Technical information
- Class: A

Links
- Website: XHHDH-FM on Facebook

XHHDH-FM is a community radio station on 106.3 FM in Santa María Huatulco, Oaxaca. It is known as Radio Mar and owned by the civil association Haciendo Efectivos los Derechos Humanos, A.C.

== History ==
Haciendo Efectivos los Derechos Humanos was approved for its concession on February 8, 2017, after applying in November 2015. The original application specified the 104.7 MHz social frequency in the 2015 IFT frequency program, but a frequency in the community/indigenous reserved band was specified instead because another social applicant had also filed for 104.7. That station, XHHUA-FM, was approved in May 2018.
