= DXPD =

Prime FM Surallah (DXPD)
Surallah; Philippines
- Broadcast area: Northern South Cotabato, parts of Sultan Kudarat
- Frequency: 89.7 MHz
- Branding: 89.7 Radyo Alternatibo

Programming
- Languages: Hiligaynon, Filipino
- Format: Contemporary MOR, News, Talk
- Network: Prime FM

Ownership
- Owner: Prime Broadcasting Network

History
- First air date: 2016
- Former names: Radyo Alternatibo

Technical information
- Licensing authority: NTC
- Power: 5 kW

89.7 Prime FM (DXPD 89.7 MHz) is an FM station owned and operated by Prime Broadcasting Network. Its studios and transmitter are located at Door #2, Villanueva Bldg., Allah Valley Dr., Surallah.
