= KIKZ =

Coordinates: 32.7195°N 102.6575°W

- Seminole, Texas; United States
- Frequency: 1250 kHz
- Branding: KIKZ 1250 AM

Programming
- Format: Adult contemporary

Ownership
- Owner: Gaines County Broadcasting, Ltd.
- Sister stations: KSEM

History
- First air date: April 15, 1954

Technical information
- Licensing authority: FCC
- Facility ID: 23018
- Class: B
- Power: 1,000 watts day 250 watts night

Links
- Public license information: Public file; LMS
- Webcast: Listen Live
- Website: kikzksem.com

KIKZ (1250 AM) is a radio station licensed to Seminole, Texas. The station broadcasts an adult contemporary format and is owned by Gaines County Broadcasting, Ltd.
