= XHETE-FM =

Radio station in Tehuacán, Puebla

Tehuacán, Puebla; Mexico
- Frequency: 106.3 FM
- Branding: Vive FM

Programming
- Format: Adult contemporary

Ownership
- Owner: Cinco Radio; (AM de Tehuacán, S.A. de C.V.)

History
- First air date: November 9, 1983 (concession)
- Former call signs: XETE-AM
- Former frequencies: 1140 kHz (1983–2022)
- Call sign meaning: From "Tehuacán" (first E added in AM-FM migration)

Technical information
- Class: B1
- ERP: 25,000 watts
- Transmitter coordinates: 18°26′27″N 97°22′26″W

Links
- Webcast: Listen live
- Website: vivefm.com.mx

XHETE-FM is a radio station on 106.3 FM in Tehuacán, Puebla, Mexico. It is owned by Cinco Radio and is known as Vive FM.

== History ==
Logo used as "Ella" 106.3

XETE-AM 1140 received its concession on November 9, 1983. The 1,000-watt daytimer was owned by Francisco González Barraza, and later by his successors. In 2000, XETE was acquired by Laura and Francisco González Gasca, as well as Arturo, Claudia, Jonathan, Alejandro and Alberto González Martínez. The current concessionaire was established in 2003.

XETE was cleared to move to FM in 2011 but was given a continuity obligation to serve 29,486 potential listeners who did not receive other radio service. The IFT awarded a concession in 2020 for a social station to replace this obligation, XECSAL-AM 1140.
