= DXCG =

Radio station in Tagum

Prime FM Tagum (DXCG)
- Tagum; Philippines
- Broadcast area: Davao del Norte, Davao de Oro, parts of Davao City
- Frequency: 102.3 MHz
- Branding: 102.3 Prime FM

Programming
- Languages: Cebuano, Filipino
- Format: Contemporary MOR, News, Talk
- Network: Prime FM
- Affiliations: Far East Broadcasting Network Corporation

Ownership
- Owner: Prime Broadcasting Network

History
- First air date: April 17, 2018
- Former names: Prime Gospel Radio (2018-2020); The Last Days Radio (2021-2025)

Technical information
- Licensing authority: NTC
- Power: 5 kW

102.3 Prime FM (DXCG 102.3 MHz) is an FM station owned and operated by Prime Broadcasting Network. Its studios and transmitter are located at Purok Waling Waling, Brgy. Visayan Village, Tagum.

== History ==
The station was formerly known as Prime Gospel Radio under Yeshua Victorious Discipler's Team from its inception in 2018 to 2020. Back then, it was located along J. Abad Santos St. On January 6, 2021, the Last Days Ministries took over the station's operations and relaunched it as The Last Days Radio. In October 2025, it transferred to 103.3 FM. On March 24, 2026, it went back on air, this time under the Prime FM network. It is one of the stations affiliated with Far East Broadcasting Network Corporation.
