= WKQK =

- Melbourne Beach, Florida; United States
- Broadcast area: Space Coast, Florida
- Frequency: 1300 kHz
- Branding: AM 1300 WKQK

Programming
- Format: Classic Contemporary Christian

Ownership
- Owner: First Baptist Church of Melbourne; (First Baptist Church, Inc.)
- Sister stations: WCIF

History
- First air date: June 22, 1959
- Former call signs: WRKT (1959–1988); WXXU (1988–2003); WTIR (2003–2008); WMEL (2008–2016)

Technical information
- Licensing authority: FCC
- Facility ID: 55005
- Class: B
- Power: 2,500 watts day; 320 watts night
- Transmitter coordinates: 28°03′27.00″N 80°38′10.80″W
- Translator: (104.5 MHz) W283DJ (Melbourne)

Links
- Public license information: Public file; LMS

WKQK (1300 kHz) is a noncommercial educational AM radio station licensed to Melbourne Beach, FL. The station is owned by First Baptist Church of Melbourne.

Until 2020, WKQK featured a full service adult contemporary radio format. It was unique in that it featured music only from local artists. The station also aired frequent local news, community announcements, marine weather forecasts, airport arrival and departure info and high school sports. Starting in 2020 the station became fully automated, with all announcements pre-recorded. The studios, offices and transmitter were off Pluckebaum Road in Cocoa, Florida. WKQK is now operating at a new location in Melbourne, Florida approved by the FCC, at lower power than before. The format is classic Contemporary Christian music.

== History ==
The station first signed on the air on June 22, 1959, as WRKT. Because the station was near Cape Canaveral, those call letters stood for "Rocket". On May 8, 1962, an FM station was added, with the call letters WRKT-FM (today WTKS-FM).
