= KSEM =

Coordinates: 32°41′58″N 102°38′12″W

- Seminole, Texas; United States
- Frequency: 106.3 MHz
- Branding: KSEM 106.3 FM

Programming
- Format: Country

Ownership
- Owner: Gaines County Broadcasting, LLC
- Sister stations: KIKZ

History
- First air date: March 15, 1985

Technical information
- Licensing authority: FCC
- Facility ID: 23019
- Class: A
- ERP: 3,000 watts
- HAAT: 53 meters (174 ft)

Links
- Public license information: Public file; LMS
- Webcast: Listen live
- Website: kikzksem.com

KSEM (106.3 FM) is a radio station licensed to Seminole, Texas. The station broadcasts a country music format and is owned by Gaines County Broadcasting, LLC.
