= WBTG (AM) =

- Sheffield, Alabama; United States
- Broadcast area: Florence-Muscle Shoals
- Frequency: 1290 kHz
- Branding: Memory Music

Programming
- Format: Adult standards

Ownership
- Owner: Slatton & Associates Broadcasters, Inc.
- Sister stations: WBTG-FM

History
- First air date: November 9, 1963 (as WSHF)
- Former call signs: WSHF (1963–1985); WHCM (1985–1987)

Technical information
- Licensing authority: FCC
- Facility ID: 60607
- Class: D
- Power: 1,000 watts day 79 watts night
- Transmitter coordinates: 34°46′27″N 87°40′14″W
- Translator: 105.9 W290CZ (Florence)

Links
- Public license information: Public file; LMS
- Webcast: Listen Live
- Website: wbtgradio.com

WBTG (1290 kHz) is an AM radio station licensed to serve Sheffield, Alabama. The station is owned by Slatton & Associates Broadcasters, Inc. It airs an adult standards format positioned as "Memory Music".

In addition to its usual music programming, Monday through Saturday mornings include a two-hour tradio program known as the Party Line which allows listeners to buy or sell personal items. On Sunday mornings, WBTG airs a half-hour program called In Touch hosted by Charles Stanley.

== History ==
WSHF AM 1290 signed on the air from its studios in Sheffield on November 6, 1963, with 1,000 watts daytime-only power. At the time, the station positioned itself as "WSHF - Where the Shoals Has Fun!" and aired an MOR format, but later in the 1970s changed to Country.

In April 1985, Sheffield Broadcasting Co., Inc,. reached an agreement to sell Country-formatted WSHF to Comco, Inc. The deal was approved by the Federal Communications Commission on May 31, 1985, and the transaction was consummated on September 3, 1985. The station's callsign was changed from WSHF to WHCM on November 18, 1985.

In October 1987, Comco Inc. reached an agreement to sell WHCM to Slatton & Associates Broadcasters Inc. The deal was approved by the FCC on December 7, 1987, and the transaction was consummated on December 17, 1987. The station's call letters were changed from WHCM to the current WBTG on December 17, 1987. The new owners changed the programming to Contemporary Christian music and later Christian Talk as counterparts to the Southern Gospel format on WBTG-FM before settling on the current "Memory Music" Adult Standards format.

Former logo

== Broadcast translator ==
On August 12, 2008, WBTG received permission from the FCC to retransmit its programming on 94.3 FM via a broadcast translator. In his application for special temporary authority, Paul Slatton cited a desire to "serve the Shoals area better at night" when the station is forced to lower its broadcast power from 1000 watts to just 79 watts and that this authority "would only be until the Commission starts receiving applications for licenses to do this same thing." The FCC approved such a measure the following year.

Broadcast translator for WBTG
Call sign	Frequency	City of license	FID	ERP (W)	Class	FCC info
W290CZ	105.9 FM	Florence, Alabama	60609	250	D	LMS
