= WTND-LP =

- Macomb, Illinois, United States; United States
- Broadcast area: McDonough County, Illinois
- Frequency: 106.3 MHz
- Branding: The Voice

Programming
- Format: Community radio

Ownership
- Owner: (T and D Communications)

History
- First air date: January 8, 2003
- Call sign meaning: Tom and Darryl

Technical information
- Licensing authority: FCC
- Facility ID: 126554
- Class: L1
- ERP: 100 watts
- HAAT: 58 meters (190 ft)
- Transmitter coordinates: 40°27′39″N 90°39′34″W

Links
- Public license information: LMS
- Website: wtnd.org

WTND-LP (106.3 FM) is a low power community radio station licensed to Macomb, Illinois, United States, and serving Macomb and McDonough County.
