= DYOD =

Radio station in Ormoc, Philippines

Prime FM Ormoc (DYOD)
- Ormoc; Philippines
- Broadcast area: Northwestern Leyte
- Frequency: 106.3 MHz
- Branding: 106.3 Prime FM

Programming
- Languages: Waray, Filipino
- Format: Contemporary MOR, News, Talk
- Network: Prime FM

Ownership
- Owner: Prime Broadcasting Network

History
- First air date: February 2017
- Former names: DABIG C Radio (2020-2021); Radyo Alternatibo (2021-2025)
- Call sign meaning: Ormoc's Dok Alternatibo

Technical information
- Licensing authority: NTC
- Power: 5 kW

106.3 Prime FM (DYOD 106.3 MHz) is an FM station owned and operated by Prime Broadcasting Network. Its studios and transmitter are located at the 3rd Floor, PDCI Bldg., Rizal St., Ormoc.
