= WLUG-LP =

- Anniston, Alabama; United States
- Frequency: 106.3 MHz
- Branding: Lighthouse Radio

Programming
- Format: Contemporary Christian

Ownership
- Owner: Center of Hope, Inc.

History
- First air date: 2015

Technical information
- Licensing authority: FCC
- Facility ID: 193683
- Class: L1
- ERP: 29 watts
- HAAT: 59 metres (194 ft)
- Transmitter coordinates: 33°40′54.6″N 85°53′23.6″W

Links
- Public license information: LMS
- Website: Official Website

WLUG-LP (106.3 FM) is a radio station licensed to serve the community of Anniston, Alabama. The station is owned by Center of Hope, Inc. It airs a contemporary Christian music format.

The station was assigned the WLUG-LP call letters by the Federal Communications Commission on July 31, 2015.
