= AllianceHealth Durant =

- Community Health Systems
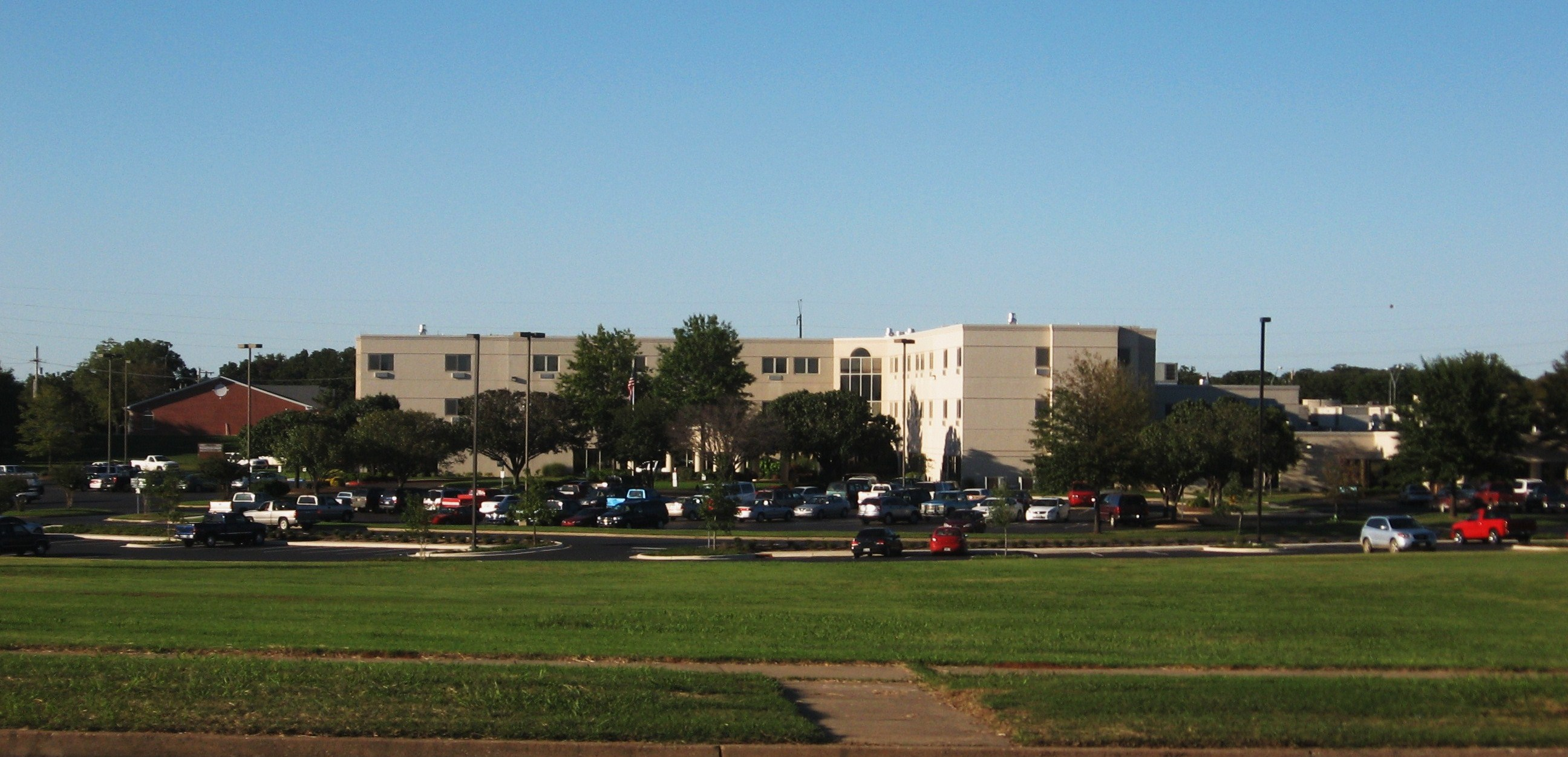

Geography
- Location: Durant, Oklahoma, United States
- Coordinates: 34°00′26″N 96°23′36″W

Organization
- Care system: Public hospital
- Type: Teaching

Services
- Beds: 120

History
- Opened: 1987

Links
- Website: http://www.alliancehealthdurant.com

AllianceHealth Durant, is a hospital located at 1800 University Boulevard in Durant, Oklahoma. The hospital was founded in 1987, replacing the older Bryan Memorial Hospital.

It was formerly known as the Medical Center of Southeastern Oklahoma.

== Capabilities ==
AllianceHealth Durant has over 100 physicians on staff. It is a subsidiary of Community Health Systems. Is a general medical and surgical hospital.

Offers specialized inpatient and outpatient birthing rooms, 20 bed ER.

100 full-time registered nurses, 40 part-time registered nurses, 54 full-time LPNs, 20 part-time LPNs, 2 Certified Emergency Nurses.
