= WOAH (FM) =

- Glennville, Georgia; United States
- Broadcast area: Hinesville, Georgia
- Frequency: 106.3 MHz(HD Radio)
- Branding: The Sparrow

Programming
- Format: Christian contemporary music

Ownership
- Owner: Liberty Radio, Inc.

History
- Former call signs: WKIG-FM (1978–2003); WCGN (2003–2004)

Technical information
- Licensing authority: FCC
- Facility ID: 64632
- Class: A
- ERP: 4,000 watts
- HAAT: 121.0 meters
- Transmitter coordinates: 31°51′18.00″N 81°44′28.00″W

Links
- Public license information: Public file; LMS
- Website: http://www.woah1063thesparrow.net/

WOAH (106.3 FM) is a radio station broadcasting a Christian contemporary music format. Licensed to Glennville, Georgia, United States, the station is currently owned by Liberty Radio, Inc.

== History ==
The station went on the air as WKIG-FM on 1978-12-04 and on 2003-03-26, the station changed its call sign to WCGN and on 2004-01-05 to the current WOAH.
