= DZVA =

Radyo Natin Laguna (DZVA)
Calamba; Philippines
- Broadcast area: Laguna and surrounding areas
- Frequency: 106.3 MHz
- Branding: Radyo Natin 106.3

Programming
- Language: Filipino
- Format: Community radio
- Network: Radyo Natin

Ownership
- Owner: MBC Media Group

History
- First air date: April 2002
- Former call signs: DZCC
- Former frequencies: 95.9 MHz (2002 - 2009)

Technical information
- Licensing authority: NTC
- Class: C, D, E
- Power: 1,000 watts

Links
- Website: Radyo Natin 106.3

DZVA (106.3 FM), broadcasting as Radyo Natin 106.3, is a radio station owned and operated by MBC Media Group. Its studio is located at the 3rd Floor, SQA Bldg., Crossing, Brgy. Uno, Calamba, Laguna, and its transmitter is located at Brgy. Bagumbayan, Santa Cruz, Laguna.

== Awards ==
- Best Media Partner for Radio - Balikat ng Bayan Awards (2017)
