= WCIF =

- Melbourne, Florida; United States
- Broadcast area: Space Coast
- Frequency: 106.3 MHz
- Branding: Hope 106.3

Programming
- Format: Christian Radio

Ownership
- Owner: First Baptist Church of Melbourne; (First Baptist Church, Inc.)
- Sister stations: WKQK

History
- First air date: January 1, 1980
- Call sign meaning: Where Christ Is First

Technical information
- Licensing authority: FCC
- Facility ID: 175256
- Class: C3
- ERP: 13,500 watts
- HAAT: 136 meters (446 ft)
- Transmitter coordinates: 28°08′15″N 80°42′11″W

Links
- Public license information: Public file; LMS
- Webcast: Listen live
- Website: wcif.com

WCIF (106.3 MHz) was a non-commercial FM radio station in Melbourne, Florida. It is owned by the First Baptist Church of Melbourne. WCIF's programming includes Christian music as well as Christian talk and teaching programs. The station began broadcasting January 1, 1980. National religious leaders heard on WCIF include Chuck Swindoll, Charles Stanley, John MacArthur, Jim Daly, Joni Eareckson Tada and David Jeremiah.

== History ==
As far back as 1971, the pastor of the First Baptist Church of Melbourne had suggested the region needed a Christian radio. A church committee began the process to apply for a construction permit from the Federal Communications Commission. The FCC had given the region a new FM allotment at 107.1. Other broadcasters supported the idea, especially when it was announced the station would be non-commercial.

On January 1, 1980, the station first signed on the air. Initially the station was on the air for limited hours but after a few years, it began 24 hour operations.
