= KIFT =

- Kremmling, Colorado; United States
- Broadcast area: Avon, Colorado; Kremmling, Colorado
- Frequency: 106.3 MHz
- Branding: Lift 106

Programming
- Format: Top 40 (CHR)

Ownership
- Owner: Patricia MacDonald Garber and Peter Benedetti; (AlwaysMountainTime, LLC)

History
- First air date: 1987 (as KTLD-FM)
- Former call signs: KSKE (1983–1987); KTLD-FM (1987–1988); KRKM (1988–2004); KKHI (2004–2005); KZMV (2005–2011)
- Call sign meaning: LIFT

Technical information
- Licensing authority: FCC
- Facility ID: 24746
- Class: C2
- ERP: 50,000 watts
- HAAT: 150 meters (490 ft)
- Transmitter coordinates: 40°7′12″N 106°14′13″W
- Translators: 99.1 K256BM (Dillon); 99.5 K258AS (Breckenridge)

Links
- Public license information: Public file; LMS
- Webcast: Listen Live
- Website: lift106.com

KIFT (106.3 FM, "Lift 106") is a radio station broadcasting a top 40/CHR music format. Licensed to Kremmling, Colorado, United States, the station is currently owned by Patricia MacDonald Garber and Peter Benedetti, through licensee AlwaysMountainTime, LLC.

== History ==
The station was assigned the call sign KSKE on 1983-08-22. On 1987-09-10, the station changed its call sign to KTLD-FM, on 1988-03-16 to KRKM, on 2004-04-23 to KKHI, on 2005-09-07, to KZMV, and on 2011-05-11 to the current KIFT.
