= KPAN (AM) =

Currently silent
- Hereford, Texas; United States
- Frequency: 860 kHz

Programming
- Format: Country

Ownership
- Owner: KPAN Broadcasters
- Sister stations: KPAN-FM

History
- First air date: August 24, 1948

Technical information
- Licensing authority: FCC
- Facility ID: 35451
- Class: B
- Power: 250 watts (day); 231 watts (night)
- Transmitter coordinates: 34.7925°N 102.4296°W

Links
- Public license information: Public file; LMS

KPAN 860 AM is a radio station licensed to Hereford, Texas. The station airs a country music format and is owned by KPAN Broadcasters.

In August 2026, KPAN cesed operations and went silent.
