= WGMK =

- Donalsonville, Georgia; United States
- Frequency: 106.3 MHz
- Branding: Rockin' 106.3

Programming
- Format: Classic rock
- Affiliations: ABC Radio

Ownership
- Owner: Flint Media, Inc.

Technical information
- Licensing authority: FCC
- Facility ID: 41208
- Class: A
- ERP: 5,900 watts
- HAAT: 101 meters
- Transmitter coordinates: 31°4′26.00″N 84°52′47.00″W

Links
- Public license information: Public file; LMS
- Website: sowegalive.com

WGMK (106.3 FM) is a radio station broadcasting a classic rock format. Licensed to Donalsonville, Georgia, United States, the station is currently owned by Flint Media, Inc. and features programming from ABC Radio . This station was originally established and run by Gilbert Meed Kelley.
