= WPNV-LP =

Coordinates: 41.490°N 90.537°W

- Peoria, Illinois; United States
- Broadcast area: Peoria
- Frequency: 106.3 MHz
- Branding: 106.3 WPNV

Programming
- Format: Urban Adult Contemporary

Ownership
- Owner: Black Business Alliance Peoria Chapter

History
- Call sign meaning: W Peoria's Neighborhood Voice

Technical information
- Licensing authority: FCC
- Facility ID: 193576
- ERP: 40 watts
- HAAT: 34.5 meters (113 ft)

Links
- Public license information: LMS
- Website: wpnv.org

WPNV-LP (106.3 FM) is a low-power FM radio station licensed to serve the community of Peoria, Illinois. The station is owned by Black Business Alliance Peoria Chapter. Garry and Denise Moore operate WPNV-LP, "Peoria's Neighborhood Voice", radio station. It airs an Urban Adult Contemporary music format.
