= KSEO =

- Durant, Oklahoma; United States
- Broadcast area: Durant, Oklahoma; Denison, Texas
- Frequency: 750 kHz
- Branding: KSEO 94.1 FM & 750 AM

Programming
- Format: Classic hits

Ownership
- Owner: Kinion Whittington; (Mid-Continental Broadcasting, LLC)

History
- First air date: 1947

Technical information
- Licensing authority: FCC
- Facility ID: 17755
- Class: D
- Power: 220 watts day
- Transmitter coordinates: 34.03667°N 96.42694°W
- Translator: 94.1 K231CE (Durant)

Links
- Public license information: Public file; LMS
- Webcast: Listen Live
- Website: 941kseo.com

KSEO (750 AM) is a radio station airing a classic hits format licensed to Durant, Oklahoma. The station serves the areas of Durant, Oklahoma, and Denison, Texas, and is owned by Kinion Whittington, through licensee Mid-Continental Broadcasting, LLC. KSEO operates only during daytime hours. It is one of few radio stations with a daytime power less than 250 watts. They are also on translator K231CE 94.1 FM in Durant, Oklahoma. This station primarily plays hits from the 1950s to the 1990s.

== Translators ==
Broadcast translator for KSEO
Call sign	Frequency	City of license	FID	ERP (W)	HAAT	Class	FCC info
K231CE	94.1 FM	Durant, Oklahoma	153244	250	102.5 m (336 ft)	D	LMS
