= KZTD =

Radio station in Cabot–Little Rock, Arkansas

- Cabot, Arkansas; United States
- Broadcast area: Little Rock, Arkansas
- Frequency: 1350 kHz
- Branding: La Konsentida 1350

Programming
- Language: Spanish
- Format: Defunct (was Regional Mexican)
- Affiliations: ESPN Deportes Radio

Ownership
- Owner: New World, LLC

History
- First air date: 1980
- Former call signs: KBOT (1980–1985); KYXZ (1985–1995); KBBL (1995–2003)
- Call sign meaning: KonZenTiDa

Technical information
- Facility ID: 25861
- Class: D
- Power: 2,500 watts (day); 73 watts (night)
- Transmitter coordinates: 34°59′59″N 92°01′41″W

KZTD (1350 AM, "La Konsentida 1350") was a radio station licensed to serve Cabot, Arkansas, United States. The station was owned by New World, LLC. KZTD served Arkansas' rapidly increasing Hispanic population with music, news, and sports. Launched in 1980 as KBOT, the station also operated for a decade (1985–1995) as KYXZ, then eight more years as KBBL, before becoming KZTD in 2003. Its license was cancelled on June 2, 2020.

== Programming ==
KZTD broadcast a Spanish-language Regional Mexican music format to the greater Little Rock, Arkansas, area. KZTD was one of several radio stations in Arkansas that aired weather warnings in Spanish. KZTD also carried select sporting events, also in Spanish, as a game-day affiliate of ESPN Deportes Radio.

== History ==
=== The beginning ===
Cabot Broadcasting received this station's original construction permit for a new 500-watt daytime-only AM station broadcasting at 1350 kHz from the Federal Communications Commission on July 22, 1980. The new station was assigned the call letters KBOT, chosen to match the "Cabot" community of license. KBOT received its license to cover from the FCC on December 10, 1980.

KBOT applied to the FCC in September 1982 for authorization to increase its signal power to 2,500 watts. The FCC issued a new construction permit to allow the station to make this upgrade on March 15, 1983.

In July 1984, Cabot Broadcasting announced an agreement to sell this station to Douglas Norman Schneider. The deal was approved by the FCC on October 1, 1984, and the transaction was consummated on December 7, 1984.

=== Switch to KYXZ ===
In March 1985, Douglas Norman Schneider filed an application to transfer the broadcast license for this station to a corporation he created called KBOT, Inc. The transfer was approved by the FCC on April 8, 1985, and the transaction was consummated on April 29, 1985. While the transfer was pending, the station applied for new call letters and was assigned KYXZ by the FCC on April 1, 1985.

KBOT, Inc. announced a deal to sell this station to Texar Communications, Inc. The deal was approved by the FCC on January 31, 1990, but ultimately fell through after station owner Douglas Norman Schneider died, so control of KYXZ remained with KBOT, Inc. In February 1990, an application was filed with the FCC to involuntarily transfer control of KBOT, Inc. from the deceased Douglas N. Schneider to Herbery B. Wittenberg, acting as the executor of Schneider's estate. The FCC approved the transfer of control on May 7, 1990.

In August 1991, KBOT, Inc. reached a new agreement to sell this station, this time to Hall Broadcasting, Inc. The deal was approved by the FCC on September 23, 1991, and the transaction was consummated on October 22, 1991.

=== The KBBL era ===
The station applied for and was assigned the call sign KBBL by the FCC on January 3, 1995. The KBBL call letters are perhaps better known as belonging to the fictional radio station on The Simpsons.

In October 1998, Hall Broadcasting, Inc. reached an agreement to sell KBBL to Equity Broadcasting Company (Larry Morton, president) for a reported price of $75,000. The deal was approved by the FCC on December 11, 1998, and the transaction was consummated on May 7, 1999.

As part of an internal corporate reorganization, Equity Broadcasting Company filed an application with the FCC to transfer the broadcast license for KBBL to its Cabot Radio, Inc. subsidiary. The transfer was approved by the FCC on September 3, 1999, and the transaction was consummated on September 15, 1999.

=== KZTD today ===
In preparation to sell the station, KBBL's owner applied to the FCC for a new call sign, and the station was assigned KZTD on September 18, 2003. In late September 2003, Equity Broadcasting Corp. (Gordon W. Heiges, VP) through its Cabot Radio, Inc. subsidiary reached an agreement to sell this station to Searcy Broadcasting, Inc. (Ken Madden, president) for a reported $55,000. The deal was approved by the FCC on November 20, 2003, and the transaction was consummated on November 26, 2003. At the time of the sale, KBBL broadcast a Spanish-language sports radio format.

In November 2006, Searcy Broadcasting, Inc. reached an agreement to sell this station to New World LLC (Arik Lev, member/president) for a reported cash price of $190,000. The deal was approved by the FCC on January 10, 2007, and the transaction was consummated on February 2, 2007. At the time of the sale, KZTD played a Regional Mexican music format.

The FCC cancelled the station's license on June 2, 2020, due to a failure to file a license renewal application.
