= CINU-FM =

Christian radio station in Truro, Nova Scotia

Coordinates: 45°20′34″N 63°11′53″W

- Truro, Nova Scotia; Canada
- Frequency: 106.3 MHz
- Branding: Hope 106.3 FM

Programming
- Format: Religious broadcasting

Ownership
- Owner: Hope FM Ministries Ltd.

History
- First air date: September 2003
- Call sign meaning: "Christ Inspires You"

Technical information
- Class: LP
- ERP: horizontal polarization only: 30 watts
- HAAT: 78 metres (256 ft)

Links
- Website: hoperadio.ca

CINU-FM is a Canadian religious broadcasting radio station, broadcasting from Truro, Nova Scotia on 106.3 FM and is branded Hope 106.3 FM. The station has been on the air since September 2003 after receiving CRTC approval in June of that same year.

Programs on the station have included the now defunct nationally syndicated CT-20 countdown of Christian music hits.

On September 3, 2009, the station received approval to move from its old FM frequency of 98.5 to a new FM frequency at 106.3 MHz. The station also received approval in part to use 106.1 MHz.
