= WKNU =

- Brewton, Alabama; United States
- Frequency: 106.3 MHz
- Branding: Coyote Country

Programming
- Format: Country
- Affiliations: ABC Radio

Ownership
- Owner: Carol Ellington; (Ellington Radio, Inc.)

History
- First air date: August 19, 1974

Technical information
- Licensing authority: FCC
- Facility ID: 19430
- Class: A
- ERP: 3,800 watts
- HAAT: 127 meters (417 feet)
- Transmitter coordinates: 31°06′42″N 87°01′17″W

Links
- Public license information: Public file; LMS

WKNU (106.3 FM, "Coyote Country") is a radio station licensed to serve Brewton, Alabama, United States. The station is owned by Carol Ellington, through licensee Ellington Radio, Inc.

WKNU broadcasts a country music format that includes some programming from ABC Radio. In addition to its usual music programming, the station airs Major League Baseball games as an affiliate of the Atlanta Braves radio network and Alabama Crimson Tide football as a member of the Crimson Tide Sports Network.

== History ==
WKNU signed on as a new FM radio station broadcasting on 106.3 MHz with 3,000 watts of effective radiated power from an antenna at 100 feet in height above average terrain. The station was owned and operated by John E. Shipp Jr. The station's original format was primarily country & western music with some hours dedicated to top 40 music, rock music, and (on Sundays) religious music.

In September 1978, John E. Shipp Jr. reached an agreement to sell this station to Hugh L. Ellington. The deal was approved by the FCC on December 11, 1978.

In July 1983, Hugh L. Ellington applied to the FCC to transfer the license for WKNU to Ellington Radio Inc. The deal was approved by the FCC on July 29, 1983.

In January 2007, Ellington Radio Inc. reached an agreement to sell this station to WKNU Radio Inc. The deal was approved by the FCC on March 5, 2007, and the transaction was consummated on March 13, 2007.

Effective October 11, 2017, WKNU Radio sold the station back to Ellington Radio, Inc.
