= WTUF =

Radio station in Boston, Georgia, serving Tallahassee, Florida

- Boston, Georgia; United States
- Broadcast area: Tallahassee area
- Frequency: 106.3 MHz

Programming
- Format: Classic Country
- Affiliations: Jones Radio Network, AP Radio

Ownership
- Owner: Boston Radio Company, Inc.

History
- First air date: 1988-03-24 (as WTXR)
- Former call signs: WTXR (1988–1988)

Technical information
- Licensing authority: FCC
- Facility ID: 6472
- Class: A
- ERP: 6,000 watts
- HAAT: 100.0 meters
- Transmitter coordinates: 30°47′40.00″N 83°46′54.00″W

Links
- Public license information: Public file; LMS
- Website: wtufradio.com

WTUF (106.3 FM) is a radio station broadcasting a Classic Country format. Licensed to Boston, Georgia, United States, the station serves the Tallahassee area. The station is currently owned by Boston Radio Company, Inc. and features programming from Jones Radio Network and AP Radio.

== History ==
The station went on the air as WTXR on 1988-03-24. On 1988-05-20, the station changed its call sign to the current WTUF.

Home Station of Thomas County Central Yellowjackets Football
