= DXDI =

Prime FM Digos (DXDI)
Digos; Philippines
- Broadcast area: Davao del Sur, parts of Davao City
- Frequency: 106.3 MHz
- Branding: 106.3 Prime FM

Programming
- Languages: Cebuano, Filipino
- Format: Contemporary MOR, News, Talk
- Network: Prime FM

Ownership
- Owner: Prime Broadcasting Network

History
- First air date: 2012
- Former names: DABIG C Radio (2019-2021); Radyo Alternatibo (2021-2025)
- Call sign meaning: Digos

Technical information
- Licensing authority: NTC
- Power: 5 kW

106.3 Prime FM (DXDI 106.3 MHz) is an FM station owned and operated by Prime Broadcasting Network. It serves as the flagship station of the Prime FM network. Its studios and transmitter are located at Estrada Subd., Brgy. Zone 2, Digos.
