= WBTG-FM =

- Sheffield, Alabama; United States
- Frequency: 106.3 MHz
- Branding: Gospel Power 106

Programming
- Format: Southern gospel
- Affiliations: SRN News

Ownership
- Owner: Slatton & Associates Broadcasters, Inc.
- Sister stations: WBTG (AM)

History
- First air date: February 1, 1978

Technical information
- Licensing authority: FCC
- Facility ID: 60608
- Class: C3
- ERP: 6,000 watts
- HAAT: 208 meters (683 feet)
- Transmitter coordinates: 34°41′34″N 87°47′49″W

Links
- Public license information: Public file; LMS
- Webcast: Listen Live
- Website: wbtgradio.com

WBTG-FM (106.3 MHz, "Gospel Power 106") is an American radio station licensed to serve the community of Sheffield, Alabama. The station was founded by Paul Slatton and is owned by Slatton & Associates Broadcasters, Inc.

== Programming ==
WBTG-FM airs a Southern Gospel music format.

== History ==
Founded as WBTG on February 1, 1978, the station was assigned the WBTG-FM call letters by the Federal Communications Commission on December 17, 1987, when its newly acquired sister station at 1290 AM changed callsigns from WHCM to WBTG.

Former logo
