= KPAN-FM =

Radio station in Hereford, Texas

Currently silent
- Hereford, Texas; United States
- Frequency: 106.3 MHz

Programming
- Format: Country

Ownership
- Owner: KPAN Broadcasters
- Sister stations: KPAN (AM)

History
- First air date: October 14, 1965 (first license granted)
- Call sign meaning: a reference to the Texas PANhandle

Technical information
- Licensing authority: FCC
- Facility ID: 35452
- Class: C2
- ERP: 30,000 watts
- HAAT: 67 meters
- Transmitter coordinates: 34°47′33.00″N 102°25′45.00″W

Links
- Public license information: Public file; LMS

KPAN-FM (106.3 FM) is a radio station broadcasting a country-music format. KPAN-FM is licensed to serve the community of Hereford, Texas, United States. The station is currently owned by KPAN Broadcasters.

The 24-hour station simulcasts on KPAN AM, broadcasting at 860 kHz. It was founded as an AM station in 1948 by former State Senator Marshall Formby. Four generations of Formbys have an interest in the station. Clint Formby, a nephew of Marshall Formby, his son, Larry C. "Chip" Formby, and two grandsons, Jonathan and Lane Formby, are all involved in the station.

In August 2026, KPAN-FM ceased operations and went silent.
