= KJZY (FM) =

Smooth jazz radio station in Sebastopol, California

Coordinates: 38.419°N 122.677°W

- Sebastopol, California; United States
- Broadcast area: Sonoma County
- Frequency: 93.7 MHz (HD Radio)
- Branding: Jazzy 93.7

Programming
- Format: Adult standards
- Subchannels: HD2: 99.1 The Bull (Classic country)
- Affiliations: Compass Media Networks

Ownership
- Owner: Redwood Empire Stereocasters
- Sister stations: KBBL

History
- First air date: 1995
- Former call signs: KJZY (1995–2020); KBBL (2020–2022)

Technical information
- Licensing authority: FCC
- Facility ID: 31444
- Class: A
- ERP: 6,000 watts
- HAAT: 66 metres (217 ft)
- Repeater: 93.7 KJZY-FM1 (Rohnert Park)

Links
- Public license information: Public file; LMS
- Webcast: FM/HD1: Listen Live; HD2: Listen Live
- Website: FM/HD1: www.kjzy.com HD2: thebull.fm

KJZY (93.7 MHz, "Jazzy 93.7") is an FM radio station in licensed to Sebastopol, California. It broadcasts to the Sonoma Valley. Owned by Redwood Empire Stereocasters, it broadcasts an adult standards format.

Its studios are co-located with its sister stations on Mendocino Avenue in Santa Rosa. A 1,200-watt booster transmitter operates on 93.7 FM in Rohnert Park, California, with the call sign KJZY-FM1.

KJZY broadcasts in the HD Radio format. Its HD2 subchannel airs a classic country format known as "99.1 The Bull".

== History ==
On November 5, 1995, the station first signed on the air as KJZY. It was begun by Gordon Zlot, and remains under the ownership of his company, Redwood Empire Stereocasters. The station played smooth jazz, featuring contemporary artists like Dave Koz, Wayman Tisdale, David Benoit, Mindi Abair and Lee Ritenour, classic artists like Ramsey Lewis and Wes Montgomery and vocalists such as Anita Baker, Sting, Sade and Basia. Music Director Rob Singleton said modern smooth jazz "is the evolution of fusion—milder fusion, the original fusion was pretty electric."

Logo as Smooth FM

On September 11, 2017, KJZY changed its format from smooth jazz to soft adult contemporary, branded as "Smooth FM 93.7." The Smooth Jazz format moved to KJZY's HD2 subchannel and translator station K256DA at 99.1 FM in Santa Rosa, known as "Smooth Jazz 99.1". The move gave a larger coverage area for the soft AC format, while maintaining the smooth jazz format in Santa Rosa and its adjacent communities. The same personalities were heard on both stations, by voice-tracking Smooth Jazz 99.1.

On August 5, 2019, and after playing "The Tide is High" by Blondie, KJZY flipped to a rhythmic/Dance-leaning contemporary hit radio format as 93.7 The Beat. The station was operated by Jamtraxx Media, and was affiliated with its club mixed oriented SPiN-FM format. The first song on The Beat was a remix of "Happier" by Marshmello and Bastille.

On January 30, 2020, it was announced that KJZY would be flipping to a country music format on February 3. On that date, at midnight, KJZY launched its new format, branded as 93.7 The Bull, and assumed the call sign KBBL from its sister station at 106.3 FM. The first song on The Bull was "10,000 Hours" by Dan + Shay and Justin Bieber.

On July 26, 2022, it was announced that "The Bull" branding would move to K256DA on August 1 and flip to classic country and KBBL would flip to adult standards using the "Jazzy" branding from K256DA. Coincident with the format change on August 1, the station flipped back to its former KJZY call sign. The K256DA translator now broadcasts as 99.1 The Bull.
