= KBBC (FM) =

- Tishomingo, Oklahoma; United States
- Broadcast area: Tishomingo, Oklahoma
- Frequency: 99.7 MHz
- Branding: B99.7 The Buzz

Programming
- Format: Variety hits

Ownership
- Owner: Mid-Continental Broadcasting, LLC

History
- First air date: 2012
- Call sign meaning: K Big Buzz C

Technical information
- Licensing authority: FCC
- Facility ID: 190369
- Class: C3
- ERP: 12,000 watts
- HAAT: 123 meters (404 ft)
- Transmitter coordinates: 34°08′33″N 96°29′47″W

Links
- Public license information: Public file; LMS
- Website: b997thebuzz.com

KBBC (99.7 FM) is a radio station licensed to Tishomingo, Oklahoma, United States. The station is currently owned by Mid-Continental Broadcasting, LLC

== History ==
This station was assigned call sign KBBC on August 15, 2012.
