= KBBL (FM) =

Contemporary hit radio station in Santa Rosa, California

- Cazadero, California; United States
- Broadcast area: Santa Rosa
- Frequency: 106.3 MHz
- Branding: Air1

Programming
- Format: Contemporary worship music
- Network: Air 1

Ownership
- Owner: Redwood Empire Stereocasters
- Operator: Educational Media Foundation
- Sister stations: KJZY

History
- First air date: June 28, 2007
- Former call signs: KGRP (2006–2010); KTRY (2010–2015); KBBL (2015–2020); KJZY (2020–2022)
- Call sign meaning: "The Bull" (former branding)

Technical information
- Licensing authority: FCC
- Facility ID: 166069
- Class: A
- ERP: 1,620 watts
- HAAT: 194 meters (636 ft)
- Transmitter coordinates: 38°29′20″N 123°1′53″W

Links
- Public license information: Public file; LMS

KBBL (106.3 FM, "Air1") is a radio station in Cazadero, California, and serving the Santa Rosa area. It airs a contemporary worship music format. The station is currently owned by Redwood Empire Stereocasters. Educational Media Foundation operates the station under a LMA deal from Redwood, and carries its Air1 network.

== History ==
=== Origins ===
The Federal Communications Commission held a spectrum auction for the 106.3 FM frequency in Cazadero in the mid-2000s. The construction permit was awarded to the Ace Radio Corporation on May 24, 2006. The station was assigned its original KGRP call letters on May 31 of that year. Construction of the station's transmitter site and setup of the studios took 13 months.

=== Early years (2007–2009) ===
On June 11, 2007, Ace Radio formally filed the application for its broadcast license. It was granted at the end of the month, and KGRP formally signed on on June 28, 2007. However, later that year, Ace Radio put the station up for sale. Redwood Empire Stereocasters would acquire the station in September 2007. The sale was approved on October 29, and was consummated on November 16.

=== Country music era (2010–2019) ===
In 2010, The station switched callsigns to KTRY, and adopted a country music format, which resulted in Nielsen Audio, registering the station as such in March of that year.

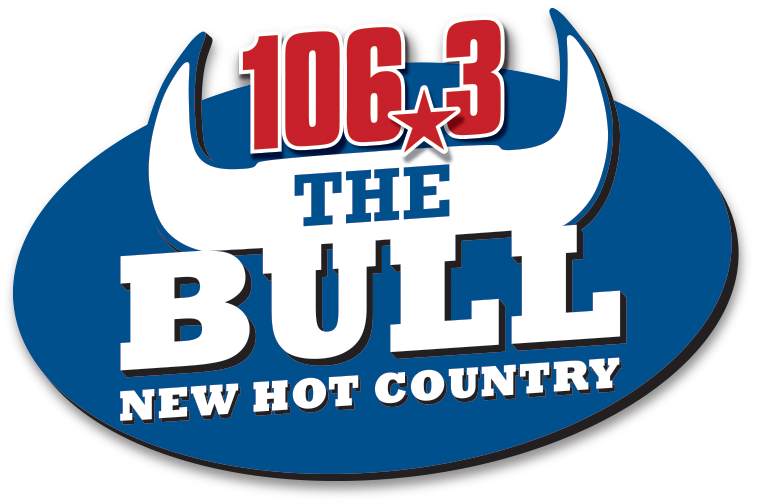
Logo as 106.3 The Bull

On May 1, 2015, at 5:00 p.m., KTRY rebranded as 106.3 The Bull. With this rebranding came another call change to KBBL. KBBL also shifted to a more contemporary presentation to attract younger listeners. 2019 would mark the station's last full year as a country music station.

=== CHR era (2020–2022) ===
On January 30, 2020, it was announced that KBBL would be flipping to a CHR radio format on February 17. The new station would be branded as "106.3 The Beat". On February 3, 2020, KBBL began stunting with a jockless loop of music, while redirecting listeners to 93.7 FM, and the stations swapped call signs, with KBBL taking on the KJZY call sign. The stunt lasted for two weeks until February 17, at midnight, when the now-KJZY formally flipped to a CHR format. The final song played on "The Beat" was "The Middle" by Zedd, Maren Morris, and Grey on March 8, 2022, at 11:57 PM local time.

=== Air 1 era (2022–present) ===
At midnight on March 9, 2022, KJZY switched to EMF's Air 1 radio service, carrying a contemporary worship radio format. EMF began operating the station under an LMA with station owner Redwood Empire Stereocasters.

On August 1, 2022, the station switched back to its former KBBL call sign.
