= Gap Broadcasting Group =

Defunct American corporation

Gap Broadcasting Group was a group of companies that owned around 116 broadcast stations (including 1 low-power television station and 5 low-power stations) in 23 radio markets in northwestern and central southern United States in the late 2000s. Managed by Oaktree Capital Management, the group acquired mainly stations from Clear Channel Communications (now iHeartMedia as of late 2014) in the mid-sized radio markets that Clear Channel was exiting. All Gap Broadcasting Group stations were acquired by Oaktree's Townsquare Media in August 2010.

== Operating companies ==
- Gap Broadcasting, which became Gap Central Broadcasting and was also known as Gap I, was based in Dallas, Texas and acquired stations in the south-central states of Arkansas, Louisiana, Oklahoma, and Texas. It also owned Class A television station KJEF-CA at Jennings, Louisiana.
- GapWest Broadcasting, also known as Gap II, was based in Greenwood Village, Colorado and acquired stations in 13 markets in Idaho, Minnesota, Montana, Washington, and Wyoming.
- A third operating company, Gap Broadcasting III or GAP East, was founded in 2009 to acquire stations east of the Mississippi River, but ended up without any acquisitions.

== Stations ==
As of May 2010, just before being acquired by Townsquare, Gap Broadcasting Group owned the following stations:

City of license	State	Call sign	Band	Facility ID	Gap
Ashdown	Arkansas	KMJI	FM	7828	Central
Texarkana	Arkansas	KOSY	AM	7072	Central
Texarkana	Arkansas	KYGL	FM	12312	Central
Chubbuck	Idaho	KLLP	FM	8413	West
Idaho Falls	Idaho	KID	AM	22194	West
Idaho Falls	Idaho	KID-FM	FM	22195	West
Lava Hot Springs	Idaho	K221CE	FM	30247	West
Pocatello	Idaho	KEGE	FM	87656	West
Pocatello	Idaho	KPKY	FM	30246	West
Pocatello	Idaho	KWIK	AM	35885	West
Twin Falls	Idaho	KEZJ-FM	FM	3403	West
Twin Falls	Idaho	KLIX	AM	3404	West
Twin Falls	Idaho	KLIX-FM	FM	3407	West
Twin Falls	Idaho	KSNQ	FM	87843	West
DeQuincy	Louisiana	KTSR	FM	71555	Central
Jennings	Louisiana	KHLA	FM	8169	Central
Jennings	Louisiana	KJEF	AM	8168	Central
Lake Arthur	Louisiana	KJMH	FM	22962	Central
Lake Charles	Louisiana	KLCL	AM	53646	Central
Lake Charles	Louisiana	KNGT	FM	53643	Central
Shreveport	Louisiana	KEEL	AM	46983	Central
Shreveport	Louisiana	KRUF	FM	60265	Central
Shreveport	Louisiana	KVKI-FM	FM	19560	Central
Shreveport	Louisiana	KWKH	AM	60266	Central
Shreveport	Louisiana	KXKS-FM	FM	46982	Central
Duluth	Minnesota	KKCB	FM	49686	West
Duluth	Minnesota	KLDJ	FM	53999	West
Duluth	Minnesota	WEBC	AM	49689	West
Proctor	Minnesota	KBMX	FM	4588	West
Belgrade	Montana	KISN	FM	24172	West
Billings	Montana	K236AB	FM	1316	West
Billings	Montana	KBBB	FM	35370	West
Billings	Montana	KBUL	AM	16772	West
Billings	Montana	KCTR-FM	FM	16773	West
Billings	Montana	KKBR	FM	16774	West
Bozeman	Montana	KMMS	AM	24170	West
Bozeman	Montana	KMMS-FM	FM	24171	West
Bozeman	Montana	KZMY	FM	72722	West
East Missoula	Montana	KMPT	AM	71754	West
Frenchtown	Montana	KVWE	FM	166027	West
Hamilton	Montana	KBAZ	FM	4700	West
Hamilton	Montana	KLYQ	AM	4699	West
Livingston	Montana	K254AL	FM	11009	West
Livingston	Montana	KPRK	AM	37816	West
Livingston	Montana	KXLB	FM	30566	West
Missoula	Montana	KENR-FM1	FM	133545	West
Missoula	Montana	KGVO	AM	71751	West
Missoula	Montana	KYSS-FM	FM	71759	West
Seeley Lake	Montana	K252BM	FM	22911	West
Shelby	Montana	KSEN	AM	67655	West
Shelby	Montana	KZIN-FM	FM	68295	West
Superior	Montana	KENR	FM	88404	West
Worden	Montana	KMHK	FM	1315	West
Lawton	Oklahoma	KLAW	FM	35045	Central
Lawton	Oklahoma	KVRW	FM	2894	Central
Lawton	Oklahoma	KZCD	FM	12791	Central
Abilene	Texas	KEAN-FM	FM	54904	Central
Abilene	Texas	KEYJ-FM	FM	17804	Central
Abilene	Texas	KFGL	FM	73681	Central
Abilene	Texas	KSLI	AM	54843	Central
Abilene	Texas	KULL	FM	22158	Central
Abilene	Texas	KYYW	AM	40997	Central
Amarillo	Texas	KATP	FM	41433	Central
Amarillo	Texas	KIXZ	AM	9308	Central
Amarillo	Texas	KMXJ-FM	FM	31463	Central
Amarillo	Texas	KPRF	FM	9307	Central
Amarillo	Texas	KXSS-FM	FM	9306	Central
Bloomington	Texas	KLUB	FM	68301	Central
Carthage	Texas	KTUX	FM	35688	Central
Diboll	Texas	KAFX-FM	FM	18105	Central
Hooks	Texas	KPWW	FM	65292	Central
Kilgore	Texas	KKTX-FM	FM	48952	Central
Kilgore	Texas	KDOK	AM	48950	Central
Lorenzo	Texas	KKCL	FM	1721	Central
Lubbock	Texas	KFMX-FM	FM	60799	Central
Lubbock	Texas	KFYO	AM	61151	Central
Lubbock	Texas	KKAM	AM	60798	Central
Lubbock	Texas	KQBR	FM	60800	Central
Lubbock	Texas	KZII-FM	FM	61150	Central
Lufkin	Texas	KYKS	FM	25582	Central
Nacogdoches	Texas	KSFA	AM	11741	Central
Nacogdoches	Texas	KTBQ	FM	11740	Central
Texarkana	Texas	KKYR-FM	FM	7066	Central
Tyler	Texas	KNUE	FM	25585	Central
Tyler	Texas	KTYL-FM	FM	35711	Central
Victoria	Texas	KIXS	FM	25584	Central
Victoria	Texas	KQVT	FM	19434	Central
Wells	Texas	KVLL-FM	FM	68130	Central
Whitehouse	Texas	KISX	FM	72661	Central
Wichita Falls	Texas	KBZS	FM	52074	Central
Wichita Falls	Texas	KNIN-FM	FM	43754	Central
Wichita Falls	Texas	KWFS	AM	6639	Central
Wichita Falls	Texas	KWFS-FM	FM	1722	Central
Basin City	Washington	KOLW	FM	51128	West
Ellensburg	Washington	K232CV	FM	64360	West
Naches	Washington	KQMY	FM	88006	West
Pasco	Washington	KEYW	FM	68846	West
Pasco	Washington	KFLD	AM	16725	West
Richland	Washington	KORD-FM	FM	16726	West
Toppenish	Washington	KDBL	FM	64507	West
Walla Walla	Washington	KXRX	FM	16727	West
Yakima	Washington	KATS	FM	64397	West
Yakima	Washington	KFFM	FM	49723	West
Yakima	Washington	KIT	AM	64398	West
Yakima	Washington	KUTI	AM	49722	West
Burns	Wyoming	KIGN	FM	56234	West
Casper	Wyoming	KKTL	AM	86873	West
Casper	Wyoming	KRNK	FM	88406	West
Casper	Wyoming	KTRS-FM	FM	26301	West
Casper	Wyoming	KTWO	AM	11924	West
Cheyenne	Wyoming	KLEN	FM	5991	West
Laramie	Wyoming	KCGY	FM	14753	West
Laramie	Wyoming	KOWB	AM	24700	West
Midwest	Wyoming	KWYY	FM	26300	West
Orchard Valley	Wyoming	KGAB	AM	30224	West
Vista West	Wyoming	KRVK	FM	7360	West

Gap Central also owned low-power television station KJEF-CA at Jennings, Louisiana (Facility ID 53643). It was also in the process of acquiring KTXN-FM at Victoria, Texas (Facility ID 13984), which it programmed under a local marketing agreement. GapWest programmed station KLMI at Rock River, Wyoming (Facility ID 164207) under a local marketing agreement.
