= KJEF-CA =

KJEF-LP
- Jennings, Louisiana; United States
- Channels: Analog: 13 (VHF)

Programming
- Affiliations: Independent; NBC (via KPLC, March−August 2004)

Ownership
- Owner: Townsquare Media; (Townsquare Media Lake Charles License, LLC)
- Sister stations: KHLA, KJEF, KJMH, KLCL, KNGT, KTSR

History
- First air date: 1989
- Last air date: April 19, 2013
- Former call signs: K13VD (August−September 1987); K13VG (September 1987−2001)
- Call sign meaning: from sister station KJEF

Technical information
- Licensing authority: FCC
- Facility ID: 8170
- Class: CA
- ERP: 12 watts
- HAAT: 67.1 m (220 ft)
- Transmitter coordinates: 30°12′38″N 92°39′55″W

Links
- Public license information: LMS

KJEF-CA (channel 13) was a low-power, Class A independent television station in Jennings, Louisiana, United States. It was the only television station owned by Townsquare Media, a company that otherwise specializes exclusively in radio.

== History ==
The station's original construction permit was originally granted on August 24, 1987, as K13VD; this was changed to K13VG a month later. The station was originally owned by Jennings Broadcasting Company along with KJEF (1290 AM) and KJEF-FM 92.9, but was sold to Cajun Country Broadcasting in 1994. K13VG was again sold, this time to Apex Broadcasting, in 2000; soon afterward, it obtained class A status and, in 2001, changed its call letters to KJEF-CA to match its radio sisters.

From March 15 until August 24, 2004, KJEF-CA suspended its normal programming and became, in effect, a temporary translator of KPLC, the NBC affiliate in Lake Charles; that station's tower had collapsed on March 4, and KJEF helped augment the lower-power auxiliary transmitter KPLC was broadcasting from upon resuming broadcasts on March 6.

Gap Broadcasting purchased Apex Broadcasting's Lafayette stations in 2007. What eventually became Gap Central Broadcasting (following the formation of GapWest Broadcasting) was folded into Townsquare Media on August 13, 2010.

The station went dark at 5 p.m. on April 19, 2013. Three days later on April 22, Townsquare surrendered the station's license to the Federal Communications Commission, who subsequently canceled it.
