= KUTI (Yakima, Washington) =

- Yakima, Washington; United States
- Broadcast area: Yakima, Washington
- Frequency: 1460 kHz
- Branding: 1460 ESPN Yakima

Programming
- Format: Sports
- Affiliations: ESPN Radio; Motor Racing Network

Ownership
- Owner: Townsquare Media; (Townsquare License, LLC)
- Sister stations: KFFM; KATS; KIT; KDBL; KMGW

History
- First air date: 1941 (as KEVE in Everett)
- Last air date: August 31, 2023
- Former call signs: KEVE (1941–1944); KTYW (1944–1947); KIMA (1947–1969); KMWX (1969–2000)
- Call sign meaning: "Cutie" (previous format)

Technical information
- Licensing authority: FCC
- Facility ID: 49722
- Class: B
- Power: 5,000 watts day; 3,700 watts night
- Transmitter coordinates: 46°33′28.5″N 120°27′6.2″W

Links
- Public license information: Public file; LMS
- Website: 1460espnyakima.com

KUTI (1460 AM) was a radio station broadcasting a sports format to the Yakima, Washington, United States area. The station was last owned by Townsquare Media. The station reached all parts of the Yakima Valley area. It aired programming from ESPN Radio.

== History ==
The 1460 frequency was first occupied by KEVE in Everett, Washington, which was first licensed October 2, 1941. It moved to Yakima in 1944 as KTYW, changing its call sign to KIMA in 1947. KIMA's call sign was changed to KMWX in 1969. Throughout the 1980s and 1990s, it broadcast an oldies format with hourly updates from NBC Radio News. KMWX was also used on the Yakima TCI Cablevision Program Guide back in the 1990s. KMWX primarily played hits from the 1960s and 1970s, and later added some 1980s.

The station took on the KUTI call sign, formerly used at 980 kHz (now KTCR), in 2000. When KUTI went on the air on 980, it was owned by Wally Nelskog, with a rock and roll format. In 1957, Harrison A. Roddick bought KUTI and played classical music. So few listeners tuned in that the station did not attract enough advertisers to keep going, and Roddick had to sell the station at a loss. Before the switch to 1460, KUTI was formerly KMWX, with a country-western format.

KUTI went off the air August 31, 2023. The Federal Communications Commission cancelled the station’s license on April 26, 2024.
