= Klix =

KLIX may refer to:

== Places ==
- Klix, Germany, a village in the municipality of Großdubrau, Saxony; Upper Sorbian: Klukš
- Klix airfield, a German airfield used for gliders

== Companies ==
- Klix (company), a producer of vending machines

=== Media outlets ===
- KLIX-FM, a radio station (96.5 FM) licensed to Twin Falls, Idaho, United States
- KLIX (AM), a radio station (1310 AM) licensed to Twin Falls, Idaho, United States
- Klix.ba, a Bosnian-Herzegovinian online media outlet
- Pop Max, formerly known as Klix!, a children's' television channel in the United Kingdom

== See also ==
- Klixbüll, a municipality in the Nordfriesland district of Schleswig-Holstein, Germany
