= KWFS =

KWFS may refer to:

- KWFS (AM), a radio station (1290 AM) licensed to Wichita Falls, Texas, United States
- KWFS-FM, a radio station (102.3 FM) licensed to Wichita Falls, Texas, United States
