= KSLI (AM) =

Abilene, Texas; United States
- Broadcast area: Abilene metropolitan area
- Frequency: 1280 kHz
- Branding: 92.5 The Ranch

Programming
- Format: Defunct (was red dirt country)

Ownership
- Owner: Townsquare Media; (Townsquare License, LLC)
- Sister stations: KEAN-FM; KEYJ-FM; KMWX; KULL; KYYW

History
- First air date: July 8, 1957 (first license granted, as KNIT)
- Last air date: February 21, 2025
- Former call signs: KNIT (1957–1998); KGMM (1998–1999); KBBA (1999–2001)

Technical information
- Facility ID: 54843
- Class: B
- Power: 500 watts (day); 226 watts (night)
- Transmitter coordinates: 32°26′30.5″N 99°43′9.3″W

Links
- Webcast: Listen live
- Website: 925theranch.com

KSLI (1280 kHz) was an AM radio station that served the Abilene, Texas area. The station was owned by Townsquare Media and until late February 2025, aired a red dirt and Texas country music format, simulcasting KMWX (92.5 FM).

== History ==
On Monday, March 1, 2010, the news/talk format on KSLI moved to sister station KYYW. KSLI then began broadcasting the classic country format that had been on KYYW.

The station was owned by Gap Central Broadcasting, which bought the station from Clear Channel Communications in 2007. Gap Central Broadcasting was folded into Townsquare Media on August 13, 2010.

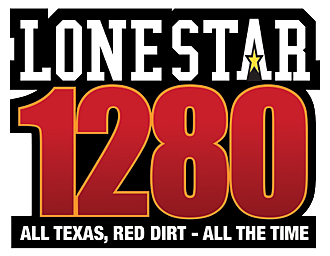
Previous logo

On Monday, February 10, 2020, KSLI transitioned from a classic country music format to a red dirt and Texas country music format under the "Lonestar 1280" branding. KSLI still aired Abilene Wylie High School basketball, baseball and softball games, and was affiliated with Texas Farm Bureau.

On January 9, 2023, KSLI began simulcasting KMWX (92.5 FM), which took on the red dirt and Texas country music format as "92.5 The Ranch". In October 2023, the station went silent due to transmitter problems. On September 21, 2024, at 2:45 PM, KSLI came back on the air with a classic country format. On February 21, 2025, at 12 noon, KSLI was taken off the air again, as part of an ongoing series of closures of underperforming Townsquare Media stations. The Federal Communications Commission cancelled the station's license on February 12, 2026.
