= Red Lick =

Red Lick may refer to:

== Places ==
United States

- Red Lick, Mississippi, an unincorporated community
- Red Lick, Texas, a city
  - Red Lick Independent School District, Texas
