= KOSY =

KOSY may refer to:

- KOSY-FM, a radio station (95.7 FM) licensed to serve Amamosa, Iowa, United States
- KOSY (AM), a defunct radio station (790 AM) formerly licensed to serve Texarkana, Arkansas, United States
- KAAZ-FM, a radio station (106.5 FM) licensed to serve Spanish Fork, Utah, United States, which held the call sign KOSY or KOSY-FM from 1997 to 2013
- KKYR-FM, a radio station (102.5 FM) licensed to serve Texarkana, Texas, United States, which held the call sign KOSY-FM until 1989
