= KJEF =

KJEF may refer to:

- Jefferson City Memorial Airport (ICAO code KJEF)
- KJEF (AM), a defunct radio station (1290 AM) formerly licensed to serve Jennings, Louisiana, United States
- KJEF-CA, a defunct low-power television station (channel 13) formerly licensed to serve Jennings, etc., Louisiana
