= KLLI =

KLLI may refer to:

- KLLI (FM), a radio station (93.9 FM) licensed to serve Los Angeles, California, United States
- KRLD-FM, a radio station (105.3 FM) licensed to serve Dallas, Texas, United States, which held the call sign KLLI from 2003 to 2008
- KPWW, a radio station (95.9 FM) licensed to serve Hooks, Texas, which held the call sign KLLI from 1985 to 1997
