= KLCL =

Currently silent
- Lake Charles, Louisiana; United States
- Broadcast area: Lake Charles metropolitan area
- Frequency: 1470 kHz

Ownership
- Owner: Townsquare Media; (Townsquare License, LLC)
- Sister stations: KHLA; KJMH; KNGT; KTSR

History
- First air date: April 26, 1935
- Former call signs: KPLC (1935–1971)
- Former frequencies: 1500 kHz (1935–1941); 1490 kHz (1941–1949)

Technical information
- Licensing authority: FCC
- Facility ID: 53646
- Class: B
- Power: 5,000 watts (day); 500 watts (night)
- Transmitter coordinates: 30°15′31″N 93°16′7″W

Links
- Public license information: Public file; LMS

KLCL (1470 AM) is a radio station licensed to Lake Charles, Louisiana, United States, that is currently silent. Owned by Townsquare Media, it operated from 1935 to 2026 and last broadcast a talk radio format known as "Talk 1470". Its transmitter is located in Westlake.

This station began broadcasting as KPLC, the first radio station in Lake Charles, and started television broadcasting as KPLC-TV (channel 7) in 1954. The radio stations were sold to separate ownership in 1971, at which time they adopted the KLCL call sign. KLCL carried a country music format into the 1980s and spent most of its last 33 years on the air with either a sports, talk or urban contemporary format. Townsquare, which acquired the station in 2010 along with others in Lake Charles, shut it down on November 9, 2026, citing economic reasons.

== History ==
=== KPLC ===
On July 24, 1934, Calcasieu Broadcasting Company applied to the Federal Communications Commission (FCC) for authority to construct a new radio station on 1500 kHz in Lake Charles, Louisiana. The commission granted the permit on February 12, 1935.

KPLC began broadcasting on April 26, 1935. Its studios were located in the Majestic Hotel in Lake Charles. In addition to local programming, KPLC was one of 25 southern stations to rebroadcast programs from WSM in Nashville, Tennessee and the Southern Broadcasting Network, which aired a weekly program originating from Louisiana State University in Baton Rouge. The station began broadcasting with 250 watts in 1937 and moved to 1490 kHz on March 29, 1941, when NARBA came into effect. In 1944, it affiliated with NBC's Red network, as a supplementary affiliate alongside KVOL in Lafayette. The station filed in 1944 to move to 1470 kHz, permitting a power increase to 1,000 watts, which the FCC granted in May 1948 after a hearing. The commission's decision gave KPLC and KRBC in Abilene, Texas, the improved frequency over KRIC in Beaumont, Texas. The frequency change took place in January 1949.

KPLC acquired the First Presbyterian Church building at Broad and Ford streets in 1951 for use as new radio studios. KPLC expanded to television with the launch of KPLC-TV (channel 7) in 1954.

With lead owner L. M. Sepaugh's health declining, the KPLC stations were sold in 1964 to Calcasieu Television and Calcasieu Radio, sister firms controlled by Pelham Mills Jr. Baseball player Stan Musial was a minority investor. The new owners built KPLC-FM (99.5) in 1965 and switched KPLC AM to a country music format in May 1966. In 1968, KPLC received zoning approval to build a new transmitter facility on a tract of land in Westlake; the existing site, surrounded by PPG Industries property, was in the way of a proposed plant expansion. The proposal attracted some criticism, including by people who believed an elementary school or houses would be more productive use of the site; at one point, five different petitions were being circulated relating to the zoning issue.

=== KLCL ===
In 1971, Calcasieu sold KPLC-TV to G. Russell Chambers and spun out the radio stations. KPLC-AM-FM was sold to a group led by Perry Samuels, who had been the former vice president of radio for Cincinnati–based Avco Broadcasting Corporation; a number of Cincinnati investors, including basketball coach and player Bob Cousy, were minority investors. Ahead of the sale's closing in August, KPLC AM and FM became KLCL AM and FM in June. The radio stations moved their studios to the transmitter site that October.

Perry Broadcasting Company attempted to sell KLCL and the associated FM (now known as KHEZ) twice in two years. In 1984, it contracted to sell the stations to Elting Enterprises of Maryland. The next year, it agreed to sell them to Holder Communications, a company owned by Bruce Singleton which had stations in Alabama and Georgia. That firm in turn merged with General Masonry, a construction and media conglomerate based in Nashville, to form GMX Communications in 1987. Zenox Corporation, an Atlanta firm, announced it would acquire GMX's radio and construction businesses in 1990, but the sale failed to complete, and GMX defaulted on its loan to lender Chrysler Capital Corporation, leading to the appointment of a receiver.

Houston Pearce acquired four of GMX's six remaining stations, including the Lake Charles pair, in 1992. At the time, KLCL and KHLA were airing an adult contemporary format. This changed on April 1, 1994, when KLCL flipped to a sports radio format as "The Team, Sports Radio 1470". It aired Louisiana State University sports and the New Orleans Saints and Houston Astros play-by-play. In 1998, Progressive acquired the rights to all McNeese State University athletics, including football, which it did not previously air.

Apex Broadcasting, the former Progressive Communications, moved KLCL's format and most of its sports programming to KEZM (1310 AM) on August 1, 2000. KLCL then began to air an urban gospel format plus LSU basketball and baseball and McNeese State basketball and baseball. It reverted to a news, talk and sports format in 2002. KLCL and KJEF (1290 AM) began simulcasting most of the time, though they split for some athletic events, such as McNeese men's and women's basketball.

Logo as Magic 1470

GAP Broadcasting acquired the Apex Lake Charles cluster in 2007. GAP, which was owned by Oaktree Capital Management, was merged into another Oaktree firm, Townsquare Media, after it was created in 2010. In 2018, KLCL switched from simulcasting KJEF to an urban contemporary format as "Magic 1470". After Hurricane Laura in 2020, which caused the station to go silent, Townsquare moved the format to KTSR (92.1 FM) on October 2, 2020. In its final years, KLCL was known as "Talk 1470" and broadcast syndicated talk shows including Brian Kilmeade, Scott Jennings, and The Dave Ramsey Show. Townsquare shut KLCL down on November 9, 2026; while its application for special temporary authority to keep the station active but silent noted that the closing was temporary and for economic reasons, Townsquare's own websites provided a more permanent closure announcement.
