= KMWX =

Coordinates: 32.277°N 99.594°W

Abilene, Texas; United States
- Broadcast area: Abilene, Texas
- Frequency: 92.5 MHz
- Branding: 92.5 The Ranch

Programming
- Format: Red dirt country
- Affiliations: Houston Texans Radio Network

Ownership
- Owner: Townsquare Media; (Townsquare License, LLC)
- Sister stations: KEAN-FM, KEYJ-FM, KULL, KYYW

History
- First air date: 1997 (as KROW)
- Former call signs: KFXJ (1989–1997); KROW (1997–1998); KULL (1998–2012)
- Call sign meaning: Similar to "mix" (former branding)

Technical information
- Licensing authority: FCC
- Facility ID: 22158
- Class: C2
- ERP: 27,500 watts
- HAAT: 202 meters (663 ft)

Links
- Public license information: Public file; LMS
- Webcast: Listen Live
- Website: 925theranch.com

KMWX (92.5 FM) is a commercial radio station located in Abilene, Texas. KMWX airs a red dirt country music format branded as "92.5 The Ranch".

== History ==
KULL aired an oldies music format branded as "Kool 92" until April 11, 2005. In 2005, it became Mix 92.5 with a hot adult contemporary format. Over the years, the format meandered between soft and hot adult contemporary but under GAP Broadcasting and Townsquare media the company classified the format at HOT AC. The call sign changed. The oldies format that had been on 92.5 resurfaced on KULL-FM at 100.7.

On January 9, 2023, the station flipped to a Texas and red dirt country format as "92.5 The Ranch", assuming the main signal in a simulcast with sister station KSLI.
