= KSLI =

KSLI may refer to:

- King's Shropshire Light Infantry
- The ICAO code for Los Alamitos Army Airfield
- KSLI (AM), an AM radio station licensed to Abilene, Texas, United States
