= KARQ =

KARQ may refer to:

- KARQ (FM), a radio station (88.5 FM) licensed to serve San Luis Obispo, California, United States
- KNVE (FM), a radio station (91.3 FM) licensed to serve Redding, California, which held the call sign KARQ from 2015 to 2017
- KLXC, a radio station (90.3 FM) licensed to serve Carlsbad, New Mexico, United States, which held the call sign KARQ in 2015
- KCAI, a radio station (89.3 FM) licensed to serve Linden, California, which held the call sign KARQ from 2005 to 2015
- KMJI, a radio station (93.3 FM) licensed to serve Ashdown, Arkansas, United States, which held the call sign KARQ from 1985 to 1999
