= KNIN =

KNIN may refer to:

- KNIN-FM, a radio station (92.9 FM) licensed to Wichita Falls, Texas, United States
- KNIN-TV, a television station (channel 9 virtual/10 digital) licensed to Caldwell, Idaho, United States
- Knin, a town in Croatia
