= KOSY (AM) =

- Texarkana, Arkansas; United States
- Broadcast area: Texarkana area
- Frequency: 790 kHz

Programming
- Format: Oldies
- Affiliations: Westwood One

Ownership
- Owner: Townsquare Media; (Townsquare License, LLC)
- Sister stations: KKYR; KMJI; KPWW; KYGL

History
- First air date: 1951
- Last air date: October 2022
- Former call signs: KOSY (1951–1989); KKYR (1989–2002)

Technical information
- Facility ID: 7072
- Class: B
- Power: 1,000 watts day; 500 watts night
- Transmitter coordinates: 33°22′25.5″N 94°1′1.7″W
- Translator: 107.5 K298DB (Texarkana)

Links
- Webcast: Listen live
- Website: goodtimeoldies1075.com

KOSY (790 AM) was a Class D regional AM radio station broadcasting an oldies format. Licensed to Texarkana, Arkansas, United States, it served the Texarkana area. The station was owned by Townsquare Media. Studios were located on Arkansas Boulevard in Texarkana, Arkansas, with a transmitter site on Line Ferry Road in the south portion of the city. The Line Ferry Road site had two towers, constructed for a nighttime directional signal of 500 watts, that later operated non-directional on one tower with 23 watts at night.

== History ==
The radio station was originally built in 1951 by W. Decker Smith, MD, as an investment. It was affiliated with the CBS Radio Network. His son, James K. Smith, ran the station for many years as the general manager. The studios were established in the same building at 119 E. 6th as the Smith Clinic medical practice. Well into the 1980s, until the building was destroyed by a fire, remnants of the old medical practice remained on the upper floors including X-ray equipment and examination tables (the broadcasting studios were on the lower floors).

In 1989, the younger Smith, who had suffered a heart attack and was approaching retirement, sold the station to corporate interests along with its sister station, KOSY-FM (Y102), which was broadcasting an adult contemporary format at the time of sale. The fact that the sister station dropped precipitously in the Arbitron ratings, facing increased competition from newly-licensed FM stations and out-of-market stations with increased coverage areas, contributed to the decision to sell. The new owners changed the call signs to KKYR and implemented a country music format, which exists to this day. The transmitter site of KOSY was on the city's southern border off Line Ferry Road but is now abandoned and the towers removed. KKYR began transmitting from a taller shared tower near Robinson Road in Texarkana shortly after the sale. This new broadcast tower could properly accommodate the 100,000-watt Class C license held by Smith since the station's sign-on in 1965 (the station operated at only 35,000 watts for many years).

On December 30, 2021, KOSY changed its format from gospel to oldies, branded as "Good Time Oldies 790/107.5", launching on FM translator K298DB, licensed to Texarkana, using the Good Time Oldies format from Westwood One. The station requested authority to go silent on October 4, 2022. The licenses for KOSY and K298DB were later surrendered on March 30, 2023, and cancelled on March 31, 2023.
