= KKBR =

Radio station in Billings, Montana

Billings, Montana; United States
- Broadcast area: Billings metropolitan area
- Frequency: 97.1 MHz
- Branding: Mix 97.1

Programming
- Format: Hot adult contemporary
- Affiliations: Compass Media Networks

Ownership
- Owner: Townsquare Media; (Townsquare License, LLC)
- Sister stations: KBUL, KCHH, KCTR-FM, KMHK

History
- First air date: December 17, 1963 (as KURL-FM)
- Former call signs: KURL-FM (1963–1979); KKOZ (1979–1981); KZLS (1981–1993)
- Call sign meaning: Kome Kiss Billings Radio (K is a substitute for a C); K-BeaR (former branding)

Technical information
- Facility ID: 16774
- Class: C2
- ERP: 28,000 watts
- HAAT: 122 meters (400 ft)
- Transmitter coordinates: 45°45′59″N 108°27′19″W

Links
- Webcast: Listen Live
- Website: billingsmix.com

KKBR (97.1 FM) - branded as Mix 97.1 - is a commercial radio station in Billings, Montana. Licensed to Billings, Montana, United States, the station serves the Billings area. The station is currently owned by Townsquare License, LLC. The station has obtained a construction permit from the FCC for a power increase to 100,000 watts.

== Types of music ==
The radio station previously aired classic hits, focusing on the hits from 1968 to 1988, as "97.1 K-Bear". On July 3, 2013, after stunting with Christmas music as "97.1 Santa FM", the station launched a Top 40/CHR format as "PopCrush 97.1" with a weekend of commercial free music, including a contest to be the first person to call the station at the first commercial break. The first 3 songs as PopCrush 97.1 were Pitbull's "Feel This Moment" featuring Christina Aguilera, Justin Timberlake's "Mirrors", and Rihanna's "Umbrella" featuring Jay-Z. On July 25, 2016, KKBR rebranded as "97.1 Kiss FM".

On August 29, 2022, it was announced that big changes are coming to this station.

On September 16, 2022, KKBR shifted from Top 40/CHR to hot adult contemporary, and rebranded as "Mix 97.1".

== Ownership ==
In October 2007, a deal was reached for KKBR to be acquired by GAP Broadcasting II LLC (Samuel Weller, president) from Clear Channel Communications as part of a 57-station deal with a total reported sale price of $74.78 million. What eventually became GapWest Broadcasting was folded into Townsquare Media on August 13, 2010.
