= KEZJ-FM =

Coordinates: 42.728°N 114.414°W

- Twin Falls, Idaho; United States
- Broadcast area: Twin Falls, Idaho
- Frequency: 95.7 MHz
- Branding: 95.7 KEZJ

Programming
- Format: Country
- Affiliations: Compass Media Networks

Ownership
- Owner: Townsquare Media; (Townsquare License, LLC)
- Sister stations: KLIX; KLIX-FM; KSNQ

History
- First air date: 1977

Technical information
- Licensing authority: FCC
- Facility ID: 3403
- Class: C1
- ERP: 100,000 watts
- HAAT: 198 meters (650 ft)

Links
- Public license information: Public file; LMS
- Webcast: Listen live
- Website: kezj.com

KEZJ-FM (95.7 MHz) is a commercial radio station located in Twin Falls, Idaho, United States. It airs a country music format.

KEZJ-FM is home to the long-running Morning Show with Brad & Jackie.

== Ownership ==
In October 2007, a deal was reached for KEZJ-FM to be acquired by GAP Broadcasting II LLC from Clear Channel Communications as part of a 57-station deal with a total reported sale price of $74.78 million. What eventually became GapWest Broadcasting was folded into Townsquare Media on August 13, 2010.
