= KCHH =

Radio station in Worden–Billings, Montana

- Worden, Montana; United States
- Broadcast area: Billings Metropolitan Area
- Frequency: 95.5 MHz
- Branding: 95.5 LITE-FM

Programming
- Format: Adult contemporary
- Affiliations: Compass Media Networks; Premiere Networks

Ownership
- Owner: Townsquare Media; (Townsquare License, LLC)
- Sister stations: KCTR-FM, KKBR, KBUL, KMHK

History
- First air date: 1975 (as KRWS)
- Former call signs: KRWS (1975–1978); KHDN-FM (1978–1984); KATM (1984–1986); KBSR-FM (1986–1989); KKUL-FM (1989–1992); KGHL-FM (1992–1993); KDWG (1993–1994); KBMJ (1994–1996); KMHK (1996–2010)
- Call sign meaning: CHHannel (former name)

Technical information
- Licensing authority: FCC
- Facility ID: 1315
- Class: C1
- ERP: 100,000 watts
- HAAT: 152 meters (499 ft)
- Transmitter coordinates: 45°44′29″N 108°8′19″W
- Translator: 95.1 K236AB (Billings)

Links
- Public license information: Public file; LMS
- Webcast: Listen Live
- Website: litefm955.com

KCHH (95.5 FM, "95.5 LITE-FM") is a radio station licensed to Worden, Montana, and serving the Billings, Montana metropolitan area. The station airs an adult contemporary format. KCHH is owned by Townsquare Media. KCHH also offers a translator at 95.1 (MHz) K236AB broadcasting off the Crown Plaza in Downtown Billings.

== Ownership ==
In October 2007, a deal was reached for KMHK to be acquired by GAP Broadcasting II LLC (Samuel Weller, president) from Clear Channel Communications as part of a 57 station deal with a total reported sale price of $74.78 million. What eventually became GapWest Broadcasting was folded into Townsquare Media on August 13, 2010.

== History ==
The 95.5 frequency started out playing classic rock as The Hawk. In the late 2000s, The Hawk moved to 103.7. 95.5 became '90s based adult hits Channel 95.5 obtaining the KCHH call sign. On April 15, 2011, KCHH changed its format from adult hits (as "Channel 95") to news/talk (simulcasting KBUL 970 AM), branded as "News Radio 95".

In August 2022, KCHH dropped its news/talk format, which continued on KBUL 970 AM Billings, and began stunting.

On November 21, 2022, KCHH ended stunting and launched a Christmas music format. The station segued to its adult contemporary format, branded as "95.5 LITE-FM", on January 1, 2023.
