= KXSS-FM =

Radio station in Amarillo, Texas

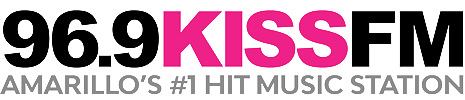
- Amarillo, Texas; United States
- Broadcast area: Amarillo, Texas
- Frequency: 96.9 MHz
- Branding: 96.9 KISS FM

Programming
- Format: Top 40 (CHR)
- Affiliations: Compass Media Networks; Premiere Networks

Ownership
- Owner: Townsquare Media; (Townsquare License, LLC)
- Sister stations: KATP, KIXZ, KMXJ-FM, KPRF

History
- First air date: 1972 (as KMML)
- Former call signs: KMML-FM (1972–2008)
- Call sign meaning: K(X)iSS

Technical information
- Licensing authority: FCC
- Facility ID: 9306
- Class: C1
- ERP: 100,000 watts
- HAAT: 187 meters
- Transmitter coordinates: 35°17′33.00″N 101°50′48.00″W

Links
- Public license information: Public file; LMS
- Webcast: Listen Live
- Website: kissfm969.com

KXSS-FM (96.9 MHz, "96-9 KISS-FM") is a top 40 (CHR) formatted commercial radio station serving the Amarillo, Texas, market. KXSS-FM is owned by Townsquare Media. Its studios are located on Southwest 34th Avenue in Southwest Amarillo, and its transmitter tower is based north of the city on the property of unrelated television station KFDA-TV in unincorporated Potter County.

Until 2008, the 96.9 frequency was home to a country music format as "96.9 KMML," under the ownership of Clear Channel Communications; however, it was one of close to 450 radio stations sold by Clear Channel in the process of privatization, beginning in 2007. KXSS, along with its sister stations KPRF-FM, KATP-FM, KMXJ-FM, and KIXZ, was acquired along with approximately fifty other stations by Gap Broadcasting for a total price of $139M. What eventually became Gap Central Broadcasting (following the formation of GapWest Broadcasting) was folded into Townsquare Media on August 13, 2010.

The KMML call sign has been reissued to a radio station in Cimarron, Kansas.
