= KBUL (AM) =

Radio station in Billings, Montana

- Billings, Montana; United States
- Broadcast area: Billings metropolitan area
- Frequency: 970 kHz
- Branding: News Talk 103.3FM 970AM

Programming
- Format: News/talk
- Affiliations: Fox News Radio; Compass Media Networks; Premiere Networks; Westwood One

Ownership
- Owner: Townsquare Media; (Townsquare License, LLC)
- Sister stations: KCHH; KCTR-FM; KKBR; KMHK

History
- First air date: March 20, 1951
- Former call signs: KOOK (1951–1985); KBIT (1985–1988); KCTR (1988–1994); KDWG (1994–1998)
- Call sign meaning: Bulletin

Technical information
- Licensing authority: FCC
- Facility ID: 16772
- Class: B
- Power: 5,000 watts
- Transmitter coordinates: 45°44′34.8″N 108°32′38.5″W
- Translator: 103.3 K277DS (Billings)

Links
- Public license information: Public file; LMS
- Webcast: Listen live
- Website: kbulnewstalk.com

KBUL (970 kHz) is an American news/talk AM radio station that broadcasts in the Billings Metro Area of the U.S. state of Montana. The station carries a news/talk format. The station covers about 76 miles in all directions during the day, and has a large coverage area north and south of Billings at night.

Former logo

== History ==
KBUL signed on the air in March 20, 1951, as KOOK, affiliated with CBS Radio. Its transmitter was located about two miles southwest of the Billings City limits. The station's construction permit dates to February 1947. The studios were located at 28th street and 1st Avenue in Billings. KOOK was owned by Mattco Inc, and later The Montana Network. The station signed on with 5,000 watts using a directional pattern, which it continues to this day.

From 1985 to 1988, the station was known as KBIT. It used the call sign KCTR from 1988 through 1994. From 1994 through 1998, the station was known as KDWG.

For much of its life, the station carried Top 40, and later, a country music format. KBUL simulcast on sister station KCTR-FM until September 2001. On September 10, 2001, the station changed calls to KBUL, standing for "Bulletin" radio, with an all news format. KBUL simulcast sister station KCHH until August 2022.

In the mid-2000s, the station carried MSU Billings Yellow Jacket Baseball games.

On August 15, 2022, KBUL rebranded as "News Talk 103.3FM 970AM" and split from simulcasting with KCHH.

== Ownership ==
In October 2007, a deal was reached for KBUL to be acquired by GAP Broadcasting II LLC (Samuel Weller, president) from Clear Channel Communications as part of a 57 station deal with a total reported sale price of $74.78 million. What eventually became GapWest Broadcasting was folded into Townsquare Media on August 13, 2010.
