= KJMH =

Coordinates: 30.202°N 92.947°W

- Lake Arthur, Louisiana; United States
- Broadcast area: Lake Charles metropolitan area
- Frequency: 107.5 MHz
- Branding: 107 Jamz

Programming
- Format: Urban contemporary
- Affiliations: Compass Media Networks; Premiere Networks

Ownership
- Owner: Townsquare Media; (Townsquare License, LLC)
- Sister stations: KHLA, KLCL, KNGT, KTSR

History
- First air date: October 10, 1997; 29 years ago (as KRAW)
- Former call signs: KRAW (1997–2000); KVEE (2000–2004)
- Call sign meaning: "Jamz"

Technical information
- Licensing authority: FCC
- Facility ID: 29962
- Class: C2
- ERP: 50,000 watts
- HAAT: 141 meters (463 ft)

Links
- Public license information: Public file; LMS
- Webcast: Listen Live
- Website: 107jamz.com

KJMH (107.5 FM, "107 Jamz") is an American radio station broadcasting an urban contemporary format. Licensed to Lake Arthur, Louisiana, United States, the station serves Lake Charles and the surrounding Southwest Louisiana area. The station is currently owned by Townsquare Media and licensed to Townsquare License, LLC. The station's studios are located on North Lakeshore Drive, just northwest of downtown Lake Charles, and its transmitter is located southeast of Iowa, Louisiana.

== History ==
In 1997, Lafayette's KRXZ (now KHXT) switched frequencies from 107.7 to 107.9, opening up the door for a new station in Lake Charles to be operated at 107.5 MHz without any interference. Progressive Communications, Inc. filed for a full power station at 107.5 and was granted one by the Federal Communications Commission (FCC) within weeks. After months of construction, the station finally signed on the air on October 10, 1997, as "Krawfish 107" with the callsigns KRAW.

Sometime in 2000, Krawfish 107, along with sister stations LA99 (now Gator 99.5), KJEF 92.9 (now 92-9 The Lake) and KJEF 1290 AM were sold to Apex Broadcasting, Inc., a small radio station company based in South Carolina.

On August 1, 2000, Apex Broadcasting flipped 107.5 from Country to Urban Contemporary as "V107.5" with the callsigns changed to KVEE.

On February 26, 2004, the format was changed again, as "107 Jamz" with the callsigns changed to KJMH and expanding the format to include Hip Hop.

In 2008, Apex Broadcasting sold the station, along with sister stations KHLA, KJEF, KLCL, KNGT, and KTSR to Gap Broadcasting, LLC. What eventually became Gap Central Broadcasting (following the formation of GapWest Broadcasting) was folded into Townsquare Media on August 13, 2010.
