= KJEF (AM) =

- Jennings, Louisiana; United States
- Broadcast area: Lake Charles metropolitan area
- Frequency: 1290 kHz
- Branding: Cajun Radio 1290

Programming
- Format: Cajun music; swamp pop
- Affiliations: Jones Radio Network; Sporting News Radio; Westwood One; Louisiana Ragin' Cajuns; New Orleans Saints Radio Network

Ownership
- Owner: Townsquare Media; (Townsquare License, LLC)
- Sister stations: KHLA; KJMH; KLCL; KNGT; KTSR

History
- First air date: 1951
- Last air date: 2023
- Former call signs: KJEF (1951–2019); KKRC (2019–2020)

Technical information
- Licensing authority: FCC
- Facility ID: 8168
- Class: B
- Power: 1,000 watts (day); 280 watts (night)
- Transmitter coordinates: 30°12′38″N 92°39′55″W

Links
- Public license information: Public file; LMS
- Webcast: Listen Live
- Website: cajunradio.com

KJEF (1290 kHz) was an AM radio station broadcasting a Cajun music and swamp pop music format. Licensed to serve Jennings, Louisiana, United States, the station was last owned by Townsquare Media. The station's studios were located on North Lakeshore Drive, just northwest of downtown Lake Charles, and its transmitter was located in Jennings.

The station was also an affiliate of the New Orleans Saints radio network.

Townsquare Media surrendered the license of KJEF on January 4, 2024, as the facility was nearing a full year of silence, which would have rendered the license expired as a matter of law. The Federal Communications Commission cancelled the license on January 8, 2024.
