= KCTR-FM =

Radio station in Billings, Montana

- Billings, Montana; United States
- Broadcast area: Billings Metropolitan Area
- Frequency: 102.9 MHz
- Branding: Cat Country 102.9

Programming
- Format: Country
- Affiliations: Compass Media Networks

Ownership
- Owner: Townsquare Media; (Townsquare License, LLC)
- Sister stations: KBUL; KCHH; KKBR; KMHK

History
- First air date: August 1979 (as KOOK-FM)
- Former call signs: KOOK-FM (1979–1984); KBIT (1984–1985); KOOK-FM (1985–1988)

Technical information
- Facility ID: 16773
- Class: C1
- ERP: 100,000 watts
- HAAT: 152 meters (499 ft)
- Transmitter coordinates: 45°45′57.7″N 108°27′18.5″W

Links
- Webcast: Listen live
- Website: catcountry1029.com

KCTR-FM (102.9 MHz, "Cat Country 103") is a commercial radio station in Billings, Montana. KCTR airs a country music format. Licensed to Billings, Montana, United States, the station serves the Billings area. The station is currently owned by Townsquare License, LLC.

== History ==
The station began broadcasting in August 1979 as KOOK-FM, sister station to KOOK (970 AM). The new outlet used Schulke Radio Productions's automated beautiful music format with just eight commercial units an hour.

KOOK-AM-FM was acquired by "Major" Dan Miller, a 25-year employee of the stations, and the Mesa Broadcasting Company of Chicago in 1983. Citing low support, KOOK-FM flipped to country as KBIT on January 16, 1984. The station returned to KOOK-FM on November 4, 1985, as part of a format and call sign trade between the AM and FM stations that moved country to AM and the former contemporary hit radio format on KOOK to FM. The move failed to generate increased interest in the stations, and Miller left the management group and KOOK.

After the FM station improved in listenership over the course of 1987, KOOK-KBIT was sold again in 1988, to Citadel Associates of Phoenix. Citadel wasted little time changing the format on KOOK-FM back to country; KOOK and KBIT began simulcasting as KCTR-AM-FM, retiring the KOOK call letters from Billings radio after having been used since 1951.

In October 2007, a deal was reached for KCTR-FM to be acquired by GAP Broadcasting II LLC (Samuel Weller, president) from Clear Channel Communications as part of a 57 station deal with a total reported sale price of $74.78 million. What eventually became GapWest Broadcasting was folded into Townsquare Media on August 13, 2010.

Former logo
