= KMHK =

Radio station in Billings, Montana

Billings, Montana; United States
- Broadcast area: Billings metropolitan area
- Frequency: 103.7 MHz
- Branding: 103.7 The Hawk

Programming
- Format: Classic rock
- Affiliations: Compass Media Networks; United Stations Radio Networks; Westwood One

Ownership
- Owner: Townsquare Media; (Townsquare License, LLC)
- Sister stations: KBUL, KCHH, KCTR-FM, KKBR

History
- First air date: 1987
- Former call signs: KOHZ (1988); KOOK (1988–1996); KBBB (1996–2010)
- Call sign meaning: K M HawK

Technical information
- Facility ID: 35370
- Class: C1
- ERP: 100,000 watts
- HAAT: 146 meters (479 ft)
- Transmitter coordinates: 45°46′0″N 108°27′27″W

Links
- Webcast: Listen Live
- Website: kmhk.com

KMHK (103.7 FM) is a commercial radio station in Billings, Montana. KMHK recently switched to a classic rock music format branded as “The New 103.7 The Hawk”. Licensed to Billings, Montana, United States, the station serves the Billings area. The station is currently owned by Townsquare License, LLC.

Former logo

== Ownership ==
In October 2007, a deal was reached for KBBB to be acquired by GAP Broadcasting II LLC (Samuel Weller, president) from Clear Channel Communications as part of a 57 station deal with a total reported sale price of $74.78 million. What eventually became GapWest Broadcasting was folded into Townsquare Media on August 13, 2010.
