= KTXN-FM =

- Victoria, Texas; United States
- Broadcast area: Victoria, Texas
- Frequency: 98.7 MHz
- Branding: 98.7 Jack FM

Programming
- Format: Adult hits
- Affiliations: Jack FM network

Ownership
- Owner: Townsquare Media; (Townsquare License, LLC)
- Sister stations: KIXS; KLUB; KQVT

History
- First air date: August 9, 1965 (first licensed, at 92.1 MHz)
- Former frequencies: 92.1 MHz (1965–1981)
- Call sign meaning: "K-Texan" (former branding)

Technical information
- Licensing authority: FCC
- Facility ID: 13984
- Class: C1
- ERP: 100,000 watts
- HAAT: 77 meters (253 ft)
- Transmitter coordinates: 28°48′47″N 97°3′48″W

Links
- Public license information: Public file; LMS
- Webcast: Listen live
- Website: 987jack.com

KTXN-FM (98.7 MHz) is an American radio station licensed to serve Victoria, Texas, United States. The station is owned by Townsquare Media. KTXN-FM broadcasts an adult hits format branded as "Jack FM".

The station was assigned the KTXN-FM call sign by the Federal Communications Commission in 1965.

== History ==
KTXN-FM was initially proposed as a 1 kilowatt Class A facility on channel 221 (92.1 MHz), elevated at 120 meters (390 ft) height above average terrain, with a transmission site and studio located at the First Victoria National Bank at 100 South Main in Victoria, by John J. and Philip J. Tibiletti in 1963. A construction permit to build the facility as specified was granted on September 28, 1964. In April 1965, modifications to the permit were applied for and granted to increase elevation to 130 meters (430 ft), with an increase of effective radiated power (ERP) to 3 kilowatts. The facility was constructed and a license to xover granted to the Tibilettis, under the licensed business name Cosmopolitan Enterprises of Victoria, on August 9, 1965.

On February 27, 1968, an application was sent to the Federal Communications Commission (FCC) to significantly upgrade the KTXN-FM facility. The proposal requested a change in channel operation to channel 236 (95.1 MHz), increase ERP to 40 kilowatts, and elevation to 155 meters (509 ft), with the transmission site moving to the adjacent property at 120 South Main St. The proposed changes were again modified on May 13, 1969, with Cosmopolitan Enterprises requesting to instead move the channel of operation to the current 254 (98.7 MHz), at the same 40 kilowatts ERP, but decreasing elevation to 150 meters (490 ft), from the proposed site at 120 South Main.

After several years of deferred action on the construction permit, a new transmission site was proposed for the facility, moving it out of town and to a new location on Farm to Market Road 1685, 2.5 miles (4.0 km) northwest of downtown Victoria. This application downgraded the ERP of KTXN-FM to 28 kilowatts, however significantly increased height above average terrain to 285 meters (935 ft) horizontal and vertical. The new facilities were licensed on November 29, 1981.

Although little is known about the history of the station, KTXN-FM previously broadcast as "K-Texan" in the 1990s, with an adult standards format. In 1998, the station was known as "Texas Radio 98.7" with a format called “Texas Mix”, which consisted of country, blues, rock, zydeco, and more Texas-like music, run by station owner Steve Coffman, who also hosted a morning show on the station called "Coffee With Coffman". The station was silent for a major portion of 2008; on November 3 of that year, the station relaunched as Jack FM.

In September 2008, Broadcast Equities Texas, Inc., reached an agreement to sell this station to Gap Broadcasting Group through their Gap Broadcasting Victoria License, LLC, subsidiary. The deal was approved by the FCC on November 25, 2008. In September 2023, Broadcast Equities Texas reached a new $159,030 deal to sell KTXN-FM to Townsquare Media, which had operated the station since its August 2010 acquisition of Gap.
