= KZCD =

Radio station in Lawton, Oklahoma

Coordinates: 34.550°N 98.540°W

- Lawton, Oklahoma; United States
- Broadcast area: Lawton, Oklahoma
- Frequency: 94.1 MHz
- Branding: Z94

Programming
- Format: Mainstream rock
- Affiliations: Compass Media Networks; Westwood One

Ownership
- Owner: Townsquare Media; (Townsquare License, LLC)
- Sister stations: KLAW, KVRW

History
- First air date: 1987 (as KQLI)
- Former call signs: KQLI (1987–1993)

Technical information
- Licensing authority: FCC
- Facility ID: 12791
- Class: C2
- ERP: 35,000 watts
- HAAT: 178 meters (584 ft)

Links
- Public license information: Public file; LMS
- Webcast: Listen Live
- Website: z94.com

KZCD (94.1 FM) is a radio station broadcasting a mainstream rock format. Also known as Z94, it serves the Lawton, Oklahoma area. It is owned by Townsquare Media. Studios are located in downtown Lawton, and the transmitter is located southwest of the city.

KZCD signed on 1987 as adult contemporary KQLI "Lite 94" and changed its call letters to KZCD in 1993.
