= KGAB =

- Orchard Valley, Wyoming; United States
- Broadcast area: Cheyenne, Wyoming
- Frequency: 650 kHz
- Branding: KGAB AM 650

Programming
- Format: Talk radio
- Affiliations: Fox News Radio; Compass Media Networks; Premiere Networks; Westwood One; Buffalo Bills Radio Network

Ownership
- Owner: Townsquare Media; (Townsquare License, LLC)
- Sister stations: KIGN, KLEN

History
- First air date: 1959
- Former call signs: KRNK (1959–1978); KVWO (1978–1979); KUUY (1979–1996); KMRZ (1996–1997)
- Former frequencies: 1590 kHz (1959–1972); 1530 kHz (1972–1987)

Technical information
- Licensing authority: FCC
- Facility ID: 30224
- Class: B
- Power: 8,500 watts (day); 500 watts (night)
- Transmitter coordinates: 41°3′10.9″N 104°49′58.9″W
- Translator: 99.5 K258DN (Orchard Valley)

Links
- Public license information: Public file; LMS
- Webcast: Listen live
- Website: kgab.com

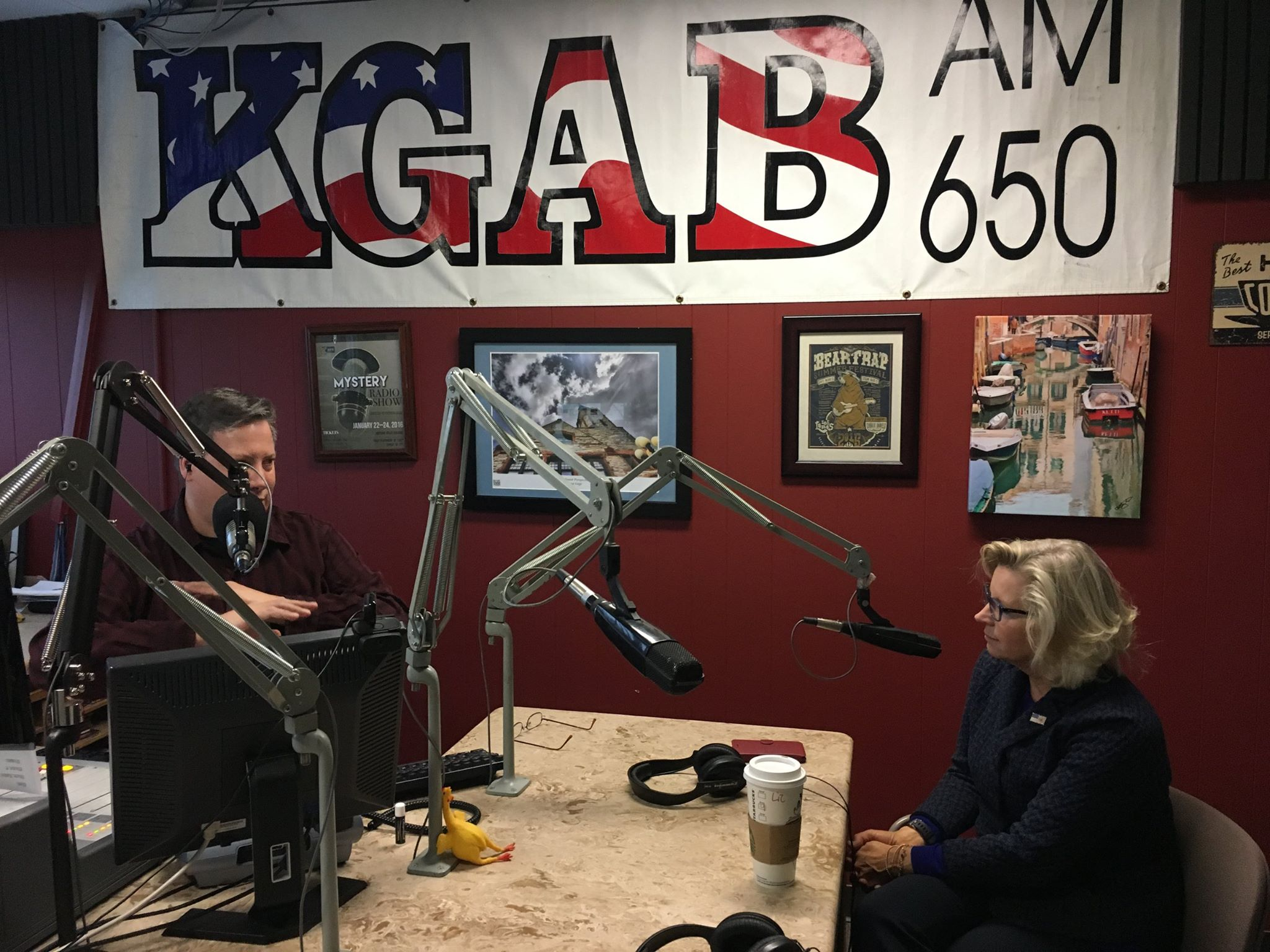
Congresswoman Liz Cheney appearing on KGAB in January 2018

KGAB (650 AM) is a commercial radio station broadcasting a talk radio format. It is licensed to Orchard Valley, Wyoming, United States, and serves the Cheyenne, Wyoming, area. The station is owned by Townsquare Media.

== History ==
Previous logo

KGAB first signed on in 1959 under the call sign KRNK broadcasting on 1590 kHz, before changing to 1530 kHz in 1972. The station later changed its call sign several times: KVWO (1978–1979), KUUY (1979–1996), and KMRZ (1996–1997), before being assigned the current KGAB call sign on March 21, 1997. KRNK was 10,000 watts during the day only, making it a daytimer. In 1960, the station, then KRNK (1590 kHz), was listed in the Broadcasting Yearbook as being owned by Cheyenne Radio, Inc., which was listed at that time as a new licensee. The station was listed as having an affiliation with the ABC Radio Network.

KRNK's license was later modified, and the station moved to 1530 kHz in the early 1970s, which included a power increase and the ability to operate at night (500 watts directional) to serve the Cheyenne area. This move required changes in its antenna system to protect clear-channel stations on the same or adjacent frequencies.

The station was assigned the call sign KVWO on June 9, 1978, which moved to a low-power station in Welch, Oklahoma.

== Signal ==
During daylight hours, KGAB operates a non-directional signal of 8,500 watts using one tower on Terry Ranch Road which provides a local coverage to all of Laramie County, as well as the city of Laramie, and the Fort Collins-Greeley-Loveland area. A decent signal is available to the Denver area, as well as a decent swath of Southeast and Central Wyoming including Casper, while a barely readable signal reaches Colorado Springs. The station does not adjust its power during sunrise and sunset, therefore allowing a window where the station extends its coverage dramatically.

At night, class-B KGAB is required to drop their signal to 500 watts, which points directionally north-west to protect clear-channels WSM Nashville, Tennessee and KENI Anchorage, Alaska. This provides a local signal to Cheyenne and Laramie, and can provide a skywave signal to Casper and even Billings. The station's signal, which is directionalized to protect distant channels at night, has been received as far away as Finland.

=== Translator ===
The FM translator, K258DN, broadcasting at 99.5 MHz, began testing in July 2021 as part of the FCC's AM revitalization effort. The translator is licensed to Orchard Valley, Wyoming, and is owned by Townsquare Media, rebroadcasting the programming of KGAB (AM 650).

Initially, the translator was planned to operate non-directionally with 250 watts ERP (Effective Radiated Power) from the tower site of its sister station, KIGN.

Around mid-August, the signal was again off the air due to the COVID-19 pandemic causing backlogs for the construction company involved; as a result, the translator instead used an old antenna at the same site, which is directionalized towards Cheyenne. When the translator first went on the air, it experienced massive interference issues. These included overlapping signals from distant station KQMT in Denver and "excessive overlap" from a tower located in downtown Cheyenne. The interference specifically affected the west side of Cheyenne, particularly near I-180.

To resolve these issues, the operators were forced to switch to an older antenna at the same site, which required the translator to be directionalized toward Cheyenne instead of operating non-directionally. On September 7, 2021, the new directional antenna system was officially approved by the FCC under a new construction permit, and the license to cover was subsequently granted. The new design throws a "severe null" (minimal signal) to the east, but provides a much cleaner signal to the city of Cheyenne, mitigating the interference problems. Officially, the city of license, Orchard Valley, is the same as KGAB's COL; however, the tower itself is closer to Altvan, Wyoming.

Broadcast translator for KGAB
Call sign	Frequency	City of license	FID	FCC info
K258DN	99.5 FM	Cheyenne, WY	202347	LMS

== Programming ==
News updates are provided either by Fox News, or by the local staff, mainly Doug Randall and Joy Greenwald, and appear at the top and bottom of each hour. Weather is also provided during these times, often provided by Cheyenne based "Day-Weather".

Due to former Cowboys quarterback Josh Allen being drafted by the Buffalo Bills, KGAB has been a part of the Bills Radio Network as its westernmost affiliate since the 2021 season.

KGAB frequently hosts interviews and discussions with local and national figures. For example, former Congresswoman Liz Cheney appeared on the station for an interview in January 2018. The station also focuses heavily on local Cheyenne issues, such as discussions about downtown development projects and local crime.

== KGAB in popular culture ==
The call letters KGAB are shared with the fictional radio station featured in the 1988 film Talk Radio, directed by Oliver Stone and starring Eric Bogosian. In the film, the controversial talk show host Barry Champlain broadcasts his show Night Talk from KGAB in Dallas, Texas. Since the Cheyenne station only adopted the call sign KGAB in 1997, nearly a decade after the movie's release, the name is likely a coincidence, but it is a notable parallel.

In The A-Team episode "Cowboy George", originally aired February 11, 1986, and guest-starring Boy George, KGAB was a top-40 country and western station serving Mono County and Twin Rivers, Arizona. In an effort to promote a concert, "Howling Mad" Murdock posed as a guest DJ playing "The Lennon Sisters" songs.
