= KVRW =

Radio station in Lawton, Oklahoma

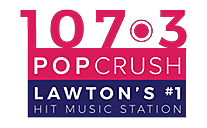
- Lawton, Oklahoma; United States
- Broadcast area: Lawton metropolitan area
- Frequency: 107.3 MHz
- Branding: 107.3 PopCrush

Programming
- Language: English
- Format: Contemporary hit radio
- Affiliations: Compass Media Networks; Westwood One

Ownership
- Owner: Townsquare Media; (Townsquare License, LLC)
- Sister stations: KLAW; KZCD

History
- First air date: 1992

Technical information
- Licensing authority: FCC
- Facility ID: 2894
- Class: C2
- ERP: 26,000 watts
- HAAT: 178 meters (584 ft)
- Transmitter coordinates: 34°38′12.00″N 98°30′27.00″W

Links
- Public license information: Public file; LMS
- Webcast: Listen live
- Website: 1073popcrush.com

KVRW (107.3 FM, "107.3 PopCrush") is a radio station broadcasting a top 40/CHR music format. Licensed to Lawton, Oklahoma, United States, the station serves the Lawton area. The station is currently owned by Townsquare Media and features programming from Westwood One. Studios are located in downtown Lawton, and the transmitter is just west of the city.

== History ==
On March 21, 2016, KVRW changed their format from classic hits (as "My 107.3") to contemporary hit radio (CHR), branded as "107.3 PopCrush".
