= KLAW =

Radio station in Lawton, Oklahoma

- Lawton, Oklahoma; United States
- Broadcast area: Lawton, Oklahoma; Duncan, Oklahoma; Burkburnett, Texas; Frederick, Oklahoma
- Frequency: 101.3 MHz
- Branding: K-LAW 101

Programming
- Format: Country music
- Affiliations: Compass Media Networks

Ownership
- Owner: Townsquare Media; (Townsquare License, LLC)
- Sister stations: KVRW, KZCD

History
- Call sign meaning: Lawton

Technical information
- Licensing authority: FCC
- Facility ID: 35045
- Class: C1
- ERP: 100,000 watts
- HAAT: 178 meters (584 ft)
- Transmitter coordinates: 34.54972°N 98.53917°W

Links
- Public license information: Public file; LMS
- Webcast: Listen Live
- Website: klaw.com

KLAW (101.3 FM) is a radio station airing a country music format licensed to Lawton, Oklahoma. The station serves the areas of Lawton; Duncan, Oklahoma; Burkburnett, Texas; and Frederick, Oklahoma, and is licensed to Townsquare License, LLC. Studios are located in downtown Lawton, and the transmitter is located southwest of the city.

Former logo
