= KMXJ-FM =

Coordinates: 35.343°N 101.823°W

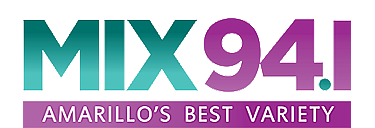
- Amarillo, Texas; United States
- Broadcast area: Amarillo, Texas
- Frequency: 94.1 MHz
- Branding: Mix 94.1

Programming
- Format: Adult contemporary
- Affiliations: Premiere Networks; United Stations Radio Networks; Westwood One

Ownership
- Owner: Townsquare Media; (Townsquare License, LLC)
- Sister stations: KATP, KIXZ, KPRF, KXSS-FM

History
- First air date: 1978 (as KBUY-FM)
- Former call signs: KBUY-FM (1978–1987); KDJW-FM (1987–1990); KBUY-FM (1990–1999)
- Call sign meaning: K MiX J

Technical information
- Licensing authority: FCC
- Facility ID: 31463
- Class: C
- ERP: 100,000 watts
- HAAT: 330 meters

Links
- Public license information: Public file; LMS
- Webcast: Listen Live
- Website: mix941kmxj.com

KMXJ-FM (94.1 MHz, "Mix 94.1") is a commercial radio station located in Amarillo, Texas. KMXJ-FM airs an adult contemporary music format branded as "Mix 94.1".

KMXJ is owned by Townsquare Media. Its studios are located on Southwest 34th Avenue in Southwest Amarillo, and its transmitter tower is based north of the city in unincorporated Potter County.
