= KIGN =

Radio station in Burns, Wyoming

- Burns, Wyoming; United States
- Broadcast area: Cheyenne, Wyoming
- Frequency: 101.9 MHz
- Branding: King FM

Programming
- Format: Classic hits
- Affiliations: Compass Media Networks

Ownership
- Owner: Townsquare Media; (Townsquare License, LLC)
- Sister stations: KGAB, KLEN

History
- First air date: July 13, 1990
- Former call signs: KMUS-FM (1990–2002)
- Call sign meaning: "King" (branding; N and G are transposed)

Technical information
- Licensing authority: FCC
- Facility ID: 56234
- Class: C2
- ERP: 50,000 watts
- HAAT: 150 meters (490 ft)
- Transmitter coordinates: 41°7′1″N 104°40′7″W

Links
- Public license information: Public file; LMS
- Webcast: Listen Live
- Website: kingfm.com

KIGN (101.9 FM, "King FM") is a radio station broadcasting a classic hits format. Licensed to Burns, Wyoming, United States, the station serves the Cheyenne area. The station is currently owned by Townsquare Media.. The station's branding is a simple play on the call sign (K-I-G-N sounding like "King").

== History ==
The station first signed on the air on July 13, 1990, with the call sign KMUS-FM.

KIGN was originally on 97.9, now KXBG owned by iHeartMedia. During the late 1990s, the station's format was Country.

The station changed its call sign to the current KIGN on June 3, 2002. It subsequently adopted the "King FM" branding and its current Classic Rock/Variety format as part of the Townsquare Media cluster in Cheyenne.
