= KBZS =

- Wichita Falls, Texas; United States
- Broadcast area: Wichita Falls area
- Frequency: 106.3 MHz
- Branding: 106.3 The Buzz

Programming
- Format: Mainstream rock
- Affiliations: Compass Media Networks; United Stations Radio Networks

Ownership
- Owner: Townsquare Media; (Townsquare License, LLC)
- Sister stations: KWFS, KWFS-FM, KNIN

History
- First air date: November 19, 1984
- Former call signs: KTLT (1984–2003)

Technical information
- Licensing authority: FCC
- Facility ID: 52074
- Class: C2
- ERP: 50,000 watts
- HAAT: 129 meters (423 ft)
- Transmitter coordinates: 33°53′18″N 98°34′8″W

Links
- Public license information: Public file; LMS
- Webcast: Listen Live
- Website: 1063thebuzz.com

KBZS (106.3 FM) is a radio station broadcasting a mainstream rock format. Licensed to Wichita Falls, Texas, United States, the station serves the Wichita Falls area. The station is currently owned by Townsquare Media and features programming from Compass Media Networks and United Stations Radio Networks.

== History ==
The station originated as KTLT on November 19, 1984. On June 16, 2003, the call sign was changed to KBZS.
