= List of Houston Texans broadcasters =

The Texans' flagship radio stations are KILT SportsRadio 610AM and KILT 100.3FM. The AM station has an all-sports format, while the FM station plays contemporary country music. Both are owned by CBS Radio. Marc Vandermeer is the play-by-play announcer. 1989 Heisman Trophy winner Andre Ware provides color commentary, and John Harris serves as a sideline reporter. Preseason games are telecast by KTRK, an ABC owned and operated station. Kevin Kugler calls the preseason games on TV, with former Oilers running back Spencer Tillman providing color commentary.

Spanish-language radio broadcasts of the team's games are aired on KLOL Mega 101 FM.

== Radio broadcasters ==
Years	Flagship station	Play-by-play	Color commentator
2002–present	KILT (AM) and FM)	Marc Vandermeer	Andre Ware
