= KIXS =

Coordinates: 28.707°N 96.835°W

- Victoria, Texas; United States
- Broadcast area: Victoria metropolitan area
- Frequency: 107.9 MHz (HD Radio)
- Branding: KIXS 108

Programming
- Format: Country
- Affiliations: Compass Media Networks

Ownership
- Owner: Townsquare Media; (Townsquare License, LLC)
- Sister stations: KLUB, KQVT, KTXN-FM

History
- First air date: December 4, 1980
- Former call signs: KZEU (1980–1991)
- Call sign meaning: Kicks

Technical information
- Licensing authority: FCC
- Facility ID: 25584
- Class: C1
- ERP: 100,000 watts
- HAAT: 166.1 meters (545 ft)

Links
- Public license information: Public file; LMS
- Webcast: Listen live
- Website: kixs.com

KIXS (107.9 FM, "KIXS 108") is a radio station serving the Victoria, Texas, area with a country music format. It is under ownership of Townsquare Media.
