= KLIX (AM) =

- Twin Falls, Idaho; United States
- Broadcast area: Twin Falls, Idaho
- Frequency: 1310 kHz
- Branding: News Radio 1310 KLIX

Programming
- Format: News/talk
- Affiliations: Fox News Radio; Premiere Networks; Westwood One

Ownership
- Owner: Townsquare Media; (Townsquare License, LLC)
- Sister stations: KEZJ-FM; KLIX-FM; KSNQ

History
- First air date: December 11, 1946

Technical information
- Licensing authority: FCC
- Facility ID: 3404
- Class: B
- Power: 5,000 watts day; 2,500 watts night
- Transmitter coordinates: 42°33′5.7″N 114°22′6.1″W
- Translator: 96.1 K241DD (Twin Falls)

Links
- Public license information: Public file; LMS
- Webcast: Listen live
- Website: newsradio1310.com

KLIX (1310 kHz) is an AM radio station broadcasting a news/talk format serving the Twin Falls, Idaho, United States, area. The station is owned by Townsquare Media and licensed to Townsquare License, LLC. KLIX features programming from Fox News Radio, Premiere Networks, and Westwood One.

== History ==
The radio station signed on the air on December 11, 1946.

In October 2007, a deal was reached for KLIX to be acquired by GAP Broadcasting II LLC (Samuel Weller, president) from Clear Channel Communications as part of a 57 station deal, with a total reported sale price of $74.78 million. What eventually became GapWest Broadcasting was folded into Townsquare Media on August 13, 2010.
