= KLEN =

- Cheyenne, Wyoming; United States
- Broadcast area: Cheyenne area
- Frequency: 106.3 MHz
- Branding: 106.3 Now FM

Programming
- Format: Top 40
- Affiliations: Compass Media Networks; Premiere Networks

Ownership
- Owner: Townsquare Media; (Townsquare License, LLC)
- Sister stations: KGAB, KIGN

History
- First air date: 1983

Technical information
- Licensing authority: FCC
- Facility ID: 5991
- Class: A
- ERP: 6,000 watts
- HAAT: 99 meters (325 ft)
- Transmitter coordinates: 41°3′9″N 104°49′55″W

Links
- Public license information: Public file; LMS
- Webcast: Listen Live
- Website: 1063nowfm.com

KLEN (106.3 FM) is a radio station broadcasting a top 40 format. Licensed to Cheyenne, Wyoming, United States, the station serves the Cheyenne area. The station is currently owned by Townsquare Media. It broadcasts a Top 40/CHR (Contemporary Hit Radio) format under the branding "106.3 Now FM".

== History ==
The KLEN-FM call sign was originally used on the 100.7 MHz frequency, now used by KOLT-FM. That facility signed on in 1979 as KLEN-FM before changing its call sign to KKAZ in 1980.

In the 2010s, the station ran a Country music format, branded as "106.3 Cowboy Country". In the Spring 2020 Nielsen Audio ratings, KLEN-FM held a 2.4 market share, often competing directly with iHeartMedia's country stations in the market.

On January 15, 2021, KLEN began simulcasting sister station KCGY, with a new format expected to debut on KLEN, once the simulcast ended.

On February 1, 2021, KLEN dropped the simulcast with KCGY and switched to its current format.
