= KEAN-FM =

Coordinates: 32.277°N 99.594°W

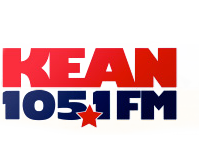

Abilene, Texas; United States
- Broadcast area: Abilene, Texas
- Frequency: 105.1 MHz
- Branding: KEAN 105.1

Programming
- Format: Country
- Affiliations: Compass Media Networks; Premiere Networks

Ownership
- Owner: Townsquare Media; (Townsquare License, LLC)
- Sister stations: KEYJ-FM, KMWX, KULL, KYYW

History
- First air date: January 1, 1965 (as KWKC-FM)
- Former call signs: KWKC-FM (1965–1969); KNIT-FM (1969–1978)

Technical information
- Licensing authority: FCC
- Facility ID: 54904
- Class: C1
- ERP: 100,000 watts
- HAAT: 270 meters (890 ft)

Links
- Public license information: Public file; LMS
- Webcast: Listen Live
- Website: keanradio.com

KEAN-FM (105.1 MHz) is a radio station that serves the Abilene, Texas, area with country music. Formerly owned by Clear Channel Communications, it was purchased in 2007 by Gap Broadcasting. What eventually became Gap Central Broadcasting (following the formation of GapWest Broadcasting) was folded into Townsquare Media on August 13, 2010.

The 105.1 frequency was built in 1964 by Citizens Broadcasting Company, owner of KWKC (1340 AM), and began as KWKC-FM on January 1, 1965. The station's antenna was at the studios of co-owned KWKC AM at 2500 Butternut. The KWKC stations went bankrupt in 1968 and were sold separately; an AM across town (KNIT 1280) acquired the facility and converted it to KNIT-FM. In 1978, KNIT AM/FM became KEAN (KEAN had been used by current station KXYL in Brownwood). KWKC's next owner eventually filed for a new FM on 100.7 that became KORQ.
