= KIT (AM) =

- Yakima, Washington; United States
- Broadcast area: Yakima, Washington
- Frequency: 1280 kHz
- Branding: News Talk KIT

Programming
- Format: News/talk
- Affiliations: Fox News Radio; Compass Media Networks; Premiere Networks; Salem Radio Network

Ownership
- Owner: Townsquare Media; (Townsquare License, LLC)
- Sister stations: KATS, KDBL, KFFM, KMGW

History
- First air date: 1922 (in Portland, Oregon), 1929 (in Yakima)
- Former call signs: KFEC (1922–1929)

Technical information
- Licensing authority: FCC
- Facility ID: 64398
- Class: B
- Power: 4,500 watts day 810 watts night
- Transmitter coordinates: 46°33′28.2″N 120°27′6.6″W
- Translator: 101.3 K267CV (Yakima)

Links
- Public license information: Public file; LMS
- Webcast: Listen Live
- Website: newstalkkit.com

KIT (1280 kHz) is an AM radio station broadcasting a news/talk format to the Yakima, Washington, United States, area. The station is licensed to Townsquare License, LLC and owned by Townsquare Media. The station features programming from Fox News Radio, Compass Media Networks and Premiere Networks, and Salem Radio Network. The transmitter and broadcast tower are located in southern Yakima along West Washington Avenue near the railroad tracks. The self-supporting tower is 63 m (207 ft) tall.

== History ==
KIT was first licensed, as KFEC, on October 2, 1922, to the Meier and Frank Company department store in Portland, Oregon. Meier and Frank was for many years the largest department store west of the Mississippi, so owning and operating a radio station located at the department store building was viewed as an appropriate public service and promotional venture for the store.

In 1929, Meier and Frank decided to sell KFEC to Carl E. Haymond, who moved the station to Yakima, which did not have a radio station at this time. The call letters were changed to KIT on March 22, 1929, and the station left the air in Portland and signed on in Yakima, the next month. In December, KIT began broadcasting on 1310 kHz with 500 watts. In 1937 it switched to 1250 kHz so it could increase power. On March 28, 1941, it moved to its present frequency of 1280 kHz as part of the implementation of the North American Regional Broadcasting Agreement.

An early children's program on KIT was "Uncle Jimmy's Clubhouse," hosted by James "Jimmy" Nolan, and the news was edited for many years by Pete Wick. During the 1940s and 1950s, KIT's Chief Engineer was Ben Murphy. During the 1950s, a late night disk jockey host was Joe Young, whose program was appropriately entitled "La Casa Jose'" (The House Of Joe).

In November 1926, the National Broadcasting Company (NBC) was incorporated. One of the first NBC programs to reach the west coast was the broadcast of the 1927 Rose Bowl Game from Pasadena, California, with announcer, Graham McNamee.

By joining the NBC Radio Network in 1931, KIT had the advantage of associating itself with the network's vast entertainment and news resources.

As the years progressed into the 1930s and 1940s, NBC's and KIT's programming improved. The network was owned by its parent company, the Radio Corporation of America (RCA), which also owned the Keith - Albee - Orpheum vaudeville circuit, later renamed Radio - Keith - Orpheum (RKO). RKO handled many vaudeville comedians that were ideally suited for radio. Some of them were Jack Benny, Burns and Allen, Fred Allen, Eddie Cantor, and Fanny Brice, among others.

During the depression of the 1930s, many people could not even afford the admission price of a movie ticket, but they could afford to purchase a radio where they could listen to free entertainment, interspersed with commercial announcements.

Being a dirt farmer during the depression, which required sweating, plowing, and staring at the rear end of a horse all day, and after cleaning up and after eating dinner, what a pleasure it was to sit down and relax, and to listen to KIT and the great radio comedians, and for free.

And since, at the time, there were no FM or television broadcasts, no Internet, no CD players, no IPods, and the like, AM radio was king, and KIT was there, right in the middle of it.

During the dark days of World War II, KIT was there to provide air raid and black out warnings. It was believed that an attack on the west coast of the United States was imminent, so people were warned to turn off their lights, and drape black cloths over their windows, so the expected bombers would see nothing but blackness.

Periodically, KIT, and the other Central Washington radio stations, would go off of the air so the bombers could not use the signals to pinpoint their bomb dropping locations, as they did at Pearl Harbor, Hawaii.

President Franklin D. Roosevelt, in his "Fireside Chats," broadcast from the White House in Washington D.C., used NBC and KIT to reassure the public that everything was safe and under control. People were literally glued to their radio receivers and KIT during this time to get news, any news, no matter how small, concerning the outcome of the war, the safety of themselves, their families, and their country.

Following World War Two, the homecoming G.I.s infused a spark of life and prosperity into the U.S. economy.

In 1942, under the provisions of the Sherman Antitrust Act, NBC was required to divest itself of its Blue Network, which later became The Blue Network Incorporated, and later The American Broadcasting Company.

As a result of this divestiture and a booming economy, more money was available to NBC to develop better, higher quality programming. In the 1940s, NBC was known as the network of the radio comedians, which gave it the distinction of being the network with the largest listener base. KIT, being an NBC Radio Network affiliate, also shared in this wide listening audience. If one wanted to hear the great radio comedians in Central Washington State, they listened to KIT.

As the years continued into the 1950s, television began to cut inroads into radio advertising revenues and sponsors began the gradual migration from radio to television. As a result, less money was available to support quality network entertainment programming. Gradually, NBC, and the other radio networks, began dropping large budget entertainment programs in favor of news and information programming. "NBC News On The Hour," and "Emphasis," became the network staples as entertainment programs were slowly phased out.

NBC radio affiliates, including KIT, had the tough decision to eventually lessen, or eliminate, their network connections in order to maintain their profit structures. At that time, KIT became a disk jockey station, that is, live hosts playing phonograph records on the air.

Later, when music licensing fees became too difficult to maintain, KIT became a news and information outlet.

At one time, KIT possessed a permit from the Federal Communications Commission to construct a television station in Yakima, but, since another station was already being built at the time, the decision was made not to move forward.

On May 18, 1980, Mount St. Helens erupted. The City of Yakima was in direct line with the prevailing winds that morning at 8:32 when the first eruption occurred. In the hours that followed, the massive cloud of smoke and ash blanketed the entire area headed in a north-easterly direction. About 2-3 inches of heavy ash fell on the area causing a widespread problem of dust, making vehicle travel on the roads come to virtually a stand still. Street lights came on it was so dark, the ability to see was down to inches rather than feet. A wide variety of problems surfaced, and the radio station became a news and information clearing house.

At the time the mountain erupted, the lone staff member at the station, Ken Rink, discontinued normal programming and switched to a news/talk format which is what the station does today. He provided news and information while soliciting officials and the community to call the station with eyewitness reports. Participants were put on the air live, and within a matter of minutes, that format was used over the next 5 days without commercials.

By 10:00 that morning, the cloud of smoke and ash had covered the area. News and information was coming in at rapid rate. Many people had concerns, questions, and announcements. Some of the station's other staff began to arrive a short time later. In the hours that followed, the experienced staff had established 2 other broadcast rooms to provide support to the main control room with regard to incoming news, interviews, recordings, editing, and production. Some of the staff answered phones and screened incoming calls. Officials were able to get through and were put on the air immediately.

The station later earned an award for its leadership role in the emergency. At that time, the station was owned by Jack Goetz. The news director was Al Bell. Other on-air staff who participated included Brian Teegarden, Dave Hansen and Derek Allen, but it was the late Al Bell who was remembered by the community years after the eruption. Al Bell had served in that capacity since the 60's, and became the news authority on radio in the Yakima area for years.

GAP Broadcasting, owned by Skip Weller, purchased the station in early 2008 from Clear Channel Communications. GapWest was folded into Townsquare Media on August 13, 2010.

Logo until 2011

On November 17, 2011, KIT began simulcasting its news/talk format on KQMY 99.3 FM, which was renamed KIT-FM (later KMGW) in February 2012. The simulcast ended in 2015, when KMGW switched to a Classic Hits format.

On November 9, 2021, KIT once again began simulcasting on FM with the sign-on of translator K267CV 101.3 Yakima.

== See also ==
- List of three-letter broadcast call signs in the United States
