= KWFS (AM) =

Radio station in Wichita Falls, Texas

Coordinates: 33°57′38.3″N 98°33′43.2″W

- Wichita Falls, Texas; United States
- Broadcast area: Wichita Falls metropolitan area
- Frequency: 1290 kHz
- Branding: NewsTalk 96.3 FM 1290 AM

Programming
- Format: News/talk
- Affiliations: Fox News Radio; Fox Sports Radio; Compass Media Networks; Premiere Networks; Westwood One

Ownership
- Owner: Townsquare Media; (Townsquare License, LLC)
- Sister stations: KBZS, KNIN-FM, KWFS-FM

History
- Founded: December 23, 1946 (launch of KTRN on FM)
- First air date: January 23, 1949
- Former call signs: KTRN (1949–1985); KLLF (1985–1995)
- Call sign meaning: "Wichita Falls"

Technical information
- Licensing authority: FCC
- Facility ID: 6639
- Class: D
- Power: 5,000 watts day; 73 watts night
- Translator: 96.3 K242DG (Wichita Falls)

Links
- Public license information: Public file; LMS
- Webcast: Listen live
- Website: newstalk1290.com

KWFS (1290 kHz) is an AM radio station with a news/talk format serving the area of Wichita Falls, Texas, United States. It is owned by Townsquare Media, with studios on Kell Boulevard in Wichita Falls.

KWFS is the oldest radio station still remaining in Wichita Falls. It was the third established in the city, but the first two outlets (on 620 and 990 kHz) were moved in to the Dallas–Fort Worth area in the 1990s.

== History ==
=== Foundation of KTRN on FM ===
As early as 1944, the city's two daily newspapers, the Wichita Daily Times and Record News, began planning to build a radio station. However, they sought not to build an AM radio station but to start an FM outlet. An application for a station on 46.5 MHz was filed on March 29 in the name of publisher Rhea Howard; a conditional grant was issued by the Federal Communications Commission (FCC) on January 9, 1946.

Final approval for a station on 97.7 MHz was granted June 1, 1946, for what the newspapers hoped to be the first FM radio station in Texas. Construction began on a new studio on Seventh Street and a transmitter building in the Westover Hills area by summer, and the new FM station took the call letters KTRN, for the Times and Record News. KTRN was beaten to air by KTHT-FM in Houston, which began on August 22; by year's end, there were also six other stations in operation. Ultimately, KTRN went on air December 23, 1946, an early Christmas gift to Wichita Falls; the day before, it broadcast Handel's Messiah from a local church as a test of its remote control equipment. The station initially operated with a temporary power of 250 watts, but it upgraded to 3,800 watts on 97.3 MHz in September 1947. April of that year saw the station obtain affiliation with the Mutual Broadcasting System.

=== On the AM band ===
While KTRN was busy bringing FM to North Texas, on November 30, 1944, the Texoma Broadcasting Company, part of the Harte-Hanks chain, applied to the FCC to build a new AM station at 970 kHz, later modified to 1290. After a hearing, the new AM station was approved on January 16, 1948. In April, the Times Publishing Company and Texoma Broadcasting Company proposed a merger of their radio interests; KTRN would take over the construction permit for the AM station, KTEN, which in turn would drop the FM permit it held.

With 5,000 watts and 1,000 watts day from a different site in the City View area, KTRN's AM service debuted on January 23, 1949. A two-hour variety show attended by 4,000 people was held in the Municipal Auditorium to commemorate the occasion. The expansion to AM turned out to be more of a migration, as the station surrendered its FM license on June 2, 1949, citing "two years of constant losses".

The year that followed the launch of KTRN on the AM dial led to a flurry of growth, including the relocation of the studios to a new building on Scott Street and a growth in the number of employees from seven to 17. KTRN even examined television and filed an application in 1951; KTRN merged its application with KWFT, but it then pulled out of the merger when it felt that the FCC was not acting quickly enough to approve the proposed joint station; it had apparently been pushed back by another application being filed for channel 6.

In 1955, the newspapers sold KTRN to a new Texoma Broadcasting Company headed by Boyd Kelley, who had previously been a part-owner. The Kelley family and Robert A. Harmon sold five years later to Broadcasting Associates, Inc., a company majority controlled by Sammons Enterprises, and in 1961, the licensee name was changed to T & O Broadcasting Company.

Over the years, KTRN adopted a country music format and also maintained a local news staff. In 1979, it was the only AM station and one of just two total that was on the air after a major tornado devastated Wichita Falls, as most of the city lost power. It was able to remain on the air because of an auxiliary power system; the station had a two-week supply of propane. The station held a promotional giveaway for a new Toyota truck in 1984 in which the winner hung on to the truck for more than 76 hours to win; his rival collapsed and fell asleep.

Raymond Ruff retired from broadcasting in 1983 and sold KTRN after 24 years of ownership to the Brandon family, whose Sunshine Broadcasting Corporation (a predecessor to American General Media and already owner of KKQV (103.3 FM)) spent $500,000 to add the station to its portfolio.

=== Christian format and news/talk ===
In May 1985, KTRN became KLLF and adopted a Christian radio format, the first such station in the city. This evolved to news/talk/sports by the early 1990s, with the last religious programming being dropped in 1994 alongside a Spanish-language radio program, and KLLF became KWFS in 1995, sharing the base designation with KWFS-FM.

Bruce Holberg, doing business as Apex Broadcasting, acquired KWFS-AM-FM in 1997 from American General Media for $1.4 million. Clear Channel Communications acquired the Holberg cluster for $6.5 million in 2000. The company then sold 52 stations in 11 markets in Texas, Oklahoma, and Arkansas, including its Wichita Falls stations, to Gap Broadcasting, a Dallas-based company owned by George Laughlin. Gap Broadcasting and co-owned Gap West were merged with the former Regent Communications to form Townsquare Media after Oaktree Capital Management, already an investor in the Gap companies, became the majority owner of Regent after its bankruptcy.

== Programming ==
KWFS programming consists primarily of national conservative talk shows. A former affiliate of The Rush Limbaugh Show, KWFS and three other Townsquare talk stations in West Texas chose The Clay Travis and Buck Sexton Show as its replacement in 2021.

One local and one regional show feature on the station's weekday lineup: Mike Hendren's Wake Up Call program in morning drive and the Chad Hasty Show, which is heard on other Townsquare talk stations in the region.
