= KLIX-FM =

Coordinates: 42.551°N 114.517°W

- Twin Falls, Idaho; United States
- Broadcast area: Twin Falls, Idaho
- Frequency: 96.5 MHz
- Branding: Kool 96.5

Programming
- Format: Classic hits
- Affiliations: Compass Media Networks

Ownership
- Owner: Townsquare Media; (Townsquare License, LLC)
- Sister stations: KEZJ-FM; KLIX; KSNQ

History
- First air date: 1974
- Former call signs: KMTW (1974–1986)

Technical information
- Licensing authority: FCC
- Facility ID: 3407
- Class: C1
- ERP: 100,000 watts
- HAAT: 40 meters (130 ft)

Links
- Public license information: Public file; LMS
- Webcast: Listen live
- Website: www.kool965.com

KLIX-FM (96.5 MHz) is a commercial radio station located in Twin Falls, Idaho. KLIX-FM airs a classic hits music format branded as "Kool 96.5".

== Ownership ==
In October 2007, a deal was reached for KLIX-FM to be acquired by GAP Broadcasting II LLC (Samuel Weller, president) from Clear Channel Communications as part of a 57 station deal with a total reported sale price of $74.78 million. What eventually became GapWest Broadcasting was folded into Townsquare Media on August 13, 2010.
