= KPRF =

Radio station in Amarillo, Texas

Coordinates: 35.184°N 101.970°W

- Amarillo, Texas; United States
- Broadcast area: Amarillo, Texas
- Frequency: 98.7 MHz
- Branding: 98.7 The Bomb

Programming
- Format: Classic hits
- Affiliations: Compass Media Networks

Ownership
- Owner: Townsquare Media; (Townsquare License, LLC)
- Sister stations: KATP, KIXZ, KMXJ-FM, KXSS-FM

History
- First air date: 1979 (as KYTX-FM)
- Former call signs: KYTX-FM (1979–1983); KMML (1983–1993); KQAC (1993–1997); KNSY (1997–1999)
- Call sign meaning: K PoweR FM (former branding)

Technical information
- Licensing authority: FCC
- Facility ID: 9307
- Class: C1
- ERP: 100,000 watts
- HAAT: 143 meters

Links
- Public license information: Public file; LMS
- Webcast: Listen Live
- Website: 987thebomb.com

KPRF (98.7 FM, "The Bomb") is a commercial classic hits radio station located in Amarillo, Texas. Its studios are located on Southwest 34th Avenue in Southwest Amarillo, and its transmitter tower is based west of the city in unincorporated Potter County, a mile west of Cadillac Ranch.

This station used to be longtime Top 40/CHR station under the moniker as "Power 98.7 FM""KPRF 98.7 Amarillo, TX April 2001".. KPRF's format change took effect March 2007.

On June 28, 2017, KPRF dropped the "Jack FM" format and began stunting with a unique format, playing a variety of songs entitled "Pay It and Play It" (claiming listeners could pay to request the songs played, yet intentionally never giving the number to call and request.) On June 29, 2017, KPRF ended stunting and launched a classic rock format, branded as "Lonestar 98.7". On August 29, 2019, KPRF rebranded as "Thunder 98.7".

On March 31, 2021, KPRF flipped to classic hits, branded as "98.7 The Bomb".
