= KQVT =

Coordinates: 28.769°N 96.986°W

- Victoria, Texas; United States
- Broadcast area: Victoria metropolitan area
- Frequency: 92.3 MHz
- Branding: Q92

Programming
- Format: Top 40 (CHR)
- Affiliations: Compass Media Networks; Westwood One

Ownership
- Owner: Townsquare Media; (Townsquare License, LLC)
- Sister stations: KIXS, KLUB, KTXN-FM

History
- First air date: December 1, 1990 (as KAMV)
- Former call signs: KAMV (1990–1992); KVLT (1992–2001)
- Call sign meaning: Q92 in VicToria

Technical information
- Licensing authority: FCC
- Facility ID: 19434
- Class: A
- ERP: 6,000 watts
- HAAT: 91 meters

Links
- Public license information: Public file; LMS
- Webcast: Listen Live
- Website: kqvt.com

KQVT (92.3 FM, "Q92") is a commercial radio station in the Victoria, Texas, area with a Top 40 (CHR) music format. It is under ownership of Townsquare Media.
