= Red Lick Independent School District =

School district in Texas, United States

Red Lick Independent School District is a public school district based in Red Lick, Texas, United States. Red Lick ISD also serves a small portion of the towns Leary and Texarkana. The district has two campuses - Red Lick Elementary (kindergarten - grade 4) and Red Lick Middle (grades 5-8). In 2009, the school district was rated "exemplary" by the Texas Education Agency.
