= KLUB =

Coordinates: 28.707°N 96.835°W

- Bloomington, Texas; United States
- Broadcast area: Victoria metropolitan area
- Frequency: 106.9 MHz
- Branding: KLUB Tejano 106.9

Programming
- Format: Tejano

Ownership
- Owner: Townsquare Media; (Townsquare License, LLC)
- Sister stations: KIXS, KQVT, KTXN-FM

History
- First air date: April 21, 1993
- Former call signs: KVMK (1991–1992, CP)

Technical information
- Licensing authority: FCC
- Facility ID: 68301
- Class: C3
- ERP: 18,500 watts
- HAAT: 116 meters

Links
- Public license information: Public file; LMS
- Webcast: Listen Live
- Website: klubtejano1069.com

KLUB (106.9 FM, "KLUB Tejano 106.9") is a radio station serving the Victoria, Texas, area. It is under ownership of Townsquare Media. It was previously known as "KLUB Classic Rock 106.9", until 12:00 PM CST, Tuesday, January 11, 2022, with a classic rock format. The day before, it broadcast a series of Selena songs under its prior branding. It now broadcasts with a Tejano format since its rebranding.
