= KEZM =

- Sulphur, Louisiana; United States
- Broadcast area: Lake Charles, Louisiana
- Frequency: 1310 kHz

Programming
- Format: Defunct (formerly Sports)

Ownership
- Owner: Merchant Broadcasting

History
- First air date: 1955 (as KSUL)
- Former call signs: KSUL (1955–1957); KIKS (1957–1975)

Technical information
- Facility ID: 36210
- Class: D
- Power: 500 watts day 50 watts night 125 watts day 12 watts night Special Temporary Authority
- Transmitter coordinates: 30°13′27″N 93°22′44″W

KEZM (1310 AM) was a radio station licensed to Sulphur, Louisiana. The station served the Lake Charles media market. The station was last owned by Merchant Broadcasting.

KEZM's license was cancelled by the Federal Communications Commission on September 27, 2021.
