= KNIN-FM =

Contemporary hit radio station in Wichita Falls, Texas

- Wichita Falls, Texas; United States
- Broadcast area: Wichita Falls area
- Frequency: 92.9 MHz
- Branding: 92.9 NIN

Programming
- Format: Top 40 (CHR)
- Affiliations: Compass Media Networks; Premiere Networks; Westwood One

Ownership
- Owner: Townsquare Media; (Townsquare License, LLC)
- Sister stations: KWFS; KWFS-FM; KBZS

History
- First air date: 1975
- Former call signs: KGOH (1973–1974, CP); KBID (1974–19981)
- Call sign meaning: "Nine"

Technical information
- Licensing authority: FCC
- Facility ID: 43754
- Class: C1
- ERP: 100,000 watts
- HAAT: 114 meters (374 ft)
- Transmitter coordinates: 33°53′18″N 98°34′9″W

Links
- Public license information: Public file; LMS
- Webcast: Listen live
- Website: www.929nin.com

KNIN-FM (92.9 MHz) is a radio station broadcasting a top 40 (CHR) format. The station serves the Wichita Falls, Texas, area. KNIN-FM is owned by Townsquare Media.

== History ==
The station was built in late 1973 and early 1974, signing on as KBID and owned by the Mustang Broadcasting Company. The call sign changed to KNIN-FM in 1981 when KNIN (990 AM) acquired it. KNIN AM and FM then swapped formats, with the easy listening format going from FM to AM, and the top 40 format moving to the FM. In 1989, the station moved to a rock-leaning flavor of top 40, similar to Dallas-Fort Worth's KEGL but it shifted back the following year.

Moran Broadcasting Company sold KNIN-FM to Apex Broadcasting in 1997; Apex was bought by Clear Channel in 2000, and Clear Channel divested the station in 2007 to Gap Broadcasting of Dallas. Gap merged with Townsquare Media in 2010.
