= KATP =

Coordinates: 35.343°N 101.823°W

Amarillo, Texas; United States
- Broadcast area: Amarillo, Texas
- Frequency: 101.9 MHz
- Branding: 101.9 The Bull

Programming
- Format: Country
- Affiliations: Compass Media Networks

Ownership
- Owner: Townsquare Media; (Townsquare License, LLC)
- Sister stations: KIXZ, KMXJ-FM, KPRF, KXSS-FM

History
- First air date: September 18, 1985; 40 years ago
- Former call signs: KZZQ (1985–1988); KESE (1988–1990)
- Call sign meaning: KAT ("Cat", former branding) P

Technical information
- Licensing authority: FCC
- Facility ID: 41433
- Class: C1
- ERP: 100,000 watts
- HAAT: 285 meters

Links
- Public license information: Public file; LMS
- Webcast: Listen Live
- Website: thebullamarillo.com

K_{ATP} is also the ATP-sensitive potassium channel responsible for pancreatic beta-cell insulin release.

KATP (101.9 FM, "The Bull") is a radio station serving the Amarillo, Texas, metro area with a country music format. It is owned by Townsquare Media. Its studios are located on Southwest 34th Avenue in Southwest Amarillo, and its transmitter tower is based north of the city in unincorporated Potter County.

== History ==
Logo under previous slogan

On March 27, 2017, KATP rebranded from "Blake FM" to "101.9 The Bull".
