= KIXZ =

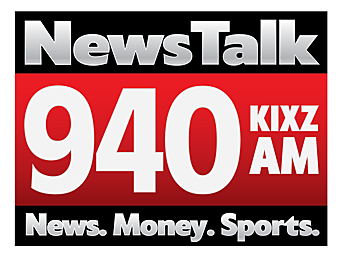
- Amarillo, Texas; United States
- Broadcast area: Amarillo area
- Frequency: 940 kHz
- Branding: News Talk 940 AM

Programming
- Format: Conservative talk
- Affiliations: Fox News Radio

Ownership
- Owner: Townsquare Media; (Townsquare License, LLC)
- Sister stations: KATP, KMXJ-FM, KPRF, KXSS-FM

History
- First air date: June 1947

Technical information
- Licensing authority: FCC
- Facility ID: 9308
- Class: B
- Power: 5,000 watts (day); 1,000 watts (night)
- Transmitter coordinates: 35°9′17.2″N 101°45′29.7″W

Links
- Public license information: Public file; LMS
- Webcast: Listen live
- Website: newstalk940.com

KIXZ (940 AM) is a commercial radio station licensed to Amarillo, Texas, United States. Owned by Townsquare Media, with the license held by Townsquare License, LLC., it features a conservative talk format, with studios on SW 34th Avenue in Amarillo. KIXZ's transmitter is sited on South Whitaker Road near SE 85th Avenue in Amarillo.

== History ==
The station signed on the air in June 1947. The call sign was KLYN and the power was 1,000 watts. It was owned by the Plains Empire Broadcasting Company with studios at 1014 West 7th Avenue. KLYN was an affiliate of the CBS Radio Network.

In the 1960s and 70s, KIXZ was a Top 40 station, playing contemporary hits for teens and 20-somethings. It competed with KPUR 1440 AM. But as contemporary music listening shifted to the FM dial in the 1990s, KIXZ switched to Adult Standards, using the "Music of Your Life" network.

KIXZ flipped to all-talk in late March 2003, during the Iraq War. The station called itself "News/Talk 940." The initial lineup included Glenn Beck, Dr. Laura Schlessinger, Sean Hannity and Michael Savage.

== Programming ==
Chuck Martin and Chad Hasty are the station's local hosts; the remainder of the schedule is nationally syndicated conservative talk shows.
