= KSNQ =

Coordinates: 42.728°N 114.414°W

- Twin Falls, Idaho; United States
- Broadcast area: Twin Falls, Idaho
- Frequency: 98.3 MHz
- Branding: 98.3 The Snake

Programming
- Format: Classic rock
- Affiliations: Compass Media Networks; United Stations Radio Networks; Westwood One

Ownership
- Owner: Townsquare Media; (Townsquare License, LLC)
- Sister stations: KEZJ-FM, KLIX, KLIX-FM

History
- First air date: 2003 (as KTWI); November 22, 2024 (as KSNQ)
- Former call signs: KTWI (2003–2004, CP)
- Call sign meaning: Snake Q

Technical information
- Licensing authority: FCC
- Facility ID: 87843
- Class: C1
- ERP: 100,000 watts
- HAAT: 198 meters (650 ft)

Links
- Public license information: Public file; LMS
- Webcast: Listen Live
- Website: 983thesnake.com

KSNQ (98.3 FM, "The Snake") is a commercial radio station located in Twin Falls, Idaho. KSNQ airs a classic rock music format. It is owned by Townsquare Media.

It is a 100 kW Class C1 station.
