= KHLA =

Radio station in Jennings–Lake Charles, Louisiana

- Jennings, Louisiana; United States
- Broadcast area: Southwest Louisiana
- Frequency: 92.9 MHz
- Branding: 92.9 The Lake

Programming
- Format: Classic hits
- Affiliations: Compass Media Networks; Premiere Networks

Ownership
- Owner: Townsquare Media; (Townsquare License, LLC)
- Sister stations: KJMH; KLCL; KNGT; KTSR

History
- First air date: January 1963
- Former call signs: KJEF-FM (1963–2002)
- Call sign meaning: "Lake"

Technical information
- Licensing authority: FCC
- Facility ID: 8169
- Class: C2
- ERP: 30,000 watts
- HAAT: 195 meters (640 ft)
- Transmitter coordinates: 30°10′48″N 93°1′52″W

Links
- Public license information: Public file; LMS
- Webcast: Listen live
- Website: 929thelake.com

KHLA (92.9 FM) is a classic hits formatted broadcast radio station licensed to Jennings, Louisiana, serving Southwest Louisiana. KHLA is owned and operated by Townsquare Media. The station's studios are located on North Lakeshore Drive, just northwest of downtown Lake Charles, and its transmitter is located south of Iowa, Louisiana.
