= KMJI =

Radio station in Ashdown, Arkansas

- Ashdown, Arkansas; United States
- Broadcast area: Texarkana, Arkansas
- Frequency: 93.3 MHz
- Branding: Majic 93-3

Programming
- Format: Urban adult contemporary
- Affiliations: Compass Media Networks; Premiere Networks; Westwood One

Ownership
- Owner: Townsquare Media; (Townsquare License, LLC)
- Sister stations: KKYR-FM, KPWW, KYGL

History
- First air date: May 25, 1985
- Former call signs: KARQ (1985–1999)
- Call sign meaning: "Majic"

Technical information
- Licensing authority: FCC
- Facility ID: 7828
- Class: C3
- ERP: 7,700 watts
- HAAT: 182 meters (597 ft)
- Transmitter coordinates: 33°30′24″N 94°12′25″W

Links
- Public license information: Public file; LMS
- Webcast: Listen live
- Website: mymajic933.com

KMJI (93.3 FM) is a radio station broadcasting an urban adult contemporary format. Licensed to Ashdown, Arkansas, United States, it serves the Texarkana area. The station is currently owned by Townsquare Media. Studios are located on Arkansas Boulevard in Texarkana, Arkansas and its transmitter is in Red Lick, Texas.

== History ==
On September 15, 2017, KMJI changed their format from hot adult contemporary to urban adult contemporary, branded as "Majic 93-3". The station has since shifted more towards an urban contemporary format with a mix of current hip hop and gospel in some shows.
