= KNGT =

Coordinates: 30.291°N 93.577°W

- Lake Charles, Louisiana; United States
- Broadcast area: Southwest Louisiana; Southeast Texas
- Frequency: 99.5 MHz
- Branding: Gator 99.5

Programming
- Format: Country
- Affiliations: Compass Media Networks; New Orleans Saints Radio Network

Ownership
- Owner: Townsquare Media; (Townsquare License, LLC)
- Sister stations: KHLA; KJMH; KLCL; KTSR

History
- First air date: November 8, 1965 (as KPLC-FM)
- Former call signs: KPLC-FM (1965–1971); KLCL-FM (1971–1982); KHEZ (1982–1983); KHEZ-FM (1983–1985); KHLA (1985–2002); KBXG (2002–2005)
- Call sign meaning: "Gator"

Technical information
- Licensing authority: FCC
- Facility ID: 53643
- Class: C0
- ERP: 100,000 watts
- HAAT: 357 meters (1,171 ft)

Links
- Public license information: Public file; LMS
- Webcast: Listen live
- Website: gator995.com

KNGT (99.5 FM, "Gator 99.5") is an American radio station licensed to Lake Charles, Louisiana, United States, broadcasting a country music format. The station is owned by Townsquare Media. The station is home to Mike Soileau and Scotty Schadler in the Morning, Middays with Jess, and Chaston in the Afternoon. KNGT is one of three country stations in Lake Charles. The station broadcasts from the KVHP TV tower 5 miles (8.0 km) northwest of Edgerly, and its studios are located northwest of downtown Lake Charles.

The station adopted the country format in 2002 as K-BIG 99 with call letters KBXG. In 2005 the station switched to Gator 99.5 with call letters KNGT. From 1985 to 2002 the station had an adult contemporary format as LA 99 with call letters KHLA.
