= KULL =

Coordinates: 32.277°N 99.594°W

Abilene, Texas; United States
- Broadcast area: Abilene, Texas
- Frequency: 100.7 MHz
- Branding: Kool FM 100.7

Programming
- Format: Classic hits
- Affiliations: Compass Media Networks; United Stations Radio Networks

Ownership
- Owner: Townsquare Media; (Townsquare License, LLC)
- Sister stations: KEAN-FM, KEYJ-FM, KMWX, KYYW

History
- First air date: 1974 (as KORQ)
- Former call signs: KORQ (1974–1984); KORQ-FM (1984–1999); KHYS (1999–2005); KFGL (2005–2012)

Technical information
- Licensing authority: FCC
- Facility ID: 73681
- Class: C1
- ERP: 100,000 watts
- HAAT: 234 meters (768 ft)

Links
- Public license information: Public file; LMS
- Webcast: Listen Live
- Website: koolfmabilene.com

KULL (100.7 FM) is a classic hits radio station located in and serving the area around Abilene, Texas. It is under ownership of Townsquare Media.

== History ==
On April 9, 2012 KFGL changed their format from oldies (as "True Oldies") to classic hits, branded as "Kool FM 100.7" under new call letters, KULL. The station has shifted to playing classic hits of the past 40 years.
