= KDBL =

Radio station in Toppenish–Yakima, Washington

- Toppenish, Washington; United States
- Broadcast area: Yakima, Washington
- Frequency: 92.9 MHz
- Branding: 92.9 The Bull

Programming
- Format: Country music
- Affiliations: Compass Media Networks

Ownership
- Owner: Townsquare Media; (Townsquare License, LLC)
- Sister stations: KATS, KFFM, KIT, KMGW

History
- First air date: 1984-08-10 (as KZHR)
- Former call signs: KZHR (1984–1988); KHYT (1988–1993); KXXS (1993–1997); KQSN (1997–2002)
- Call sign meaning: K Da BuLl

Technical information
- Licensing authority: FCC
- Facility ID: 64507
- Class: C2
- ERP: 17,000 watts
- HAAT: 257 meters
- Transmitter coordinates: 46°30′15.00″N 120°23′33.00″W

Links
- Public license information: Public file; LMS
- Webcast: Listen Live
- Website: 929thebull.com

KDBL (92.9 FM) is a radio station broadcasting a country music format. Licensed to Toppenish, Washington, United States, the station serves the Yakima area. The station is currently owned by Townsquare Media.

== History ==
The station went on the air as KZHR on August 10, 1984, on 92.9 FM with a Top-40 format. On 1988-12-01, the station changed its call sign to KHYT. On December 20, 1993, 92.9 FM changed their callsign again to KXXS with a country format, and a branding change to 'Kicks 93'. On September 8, 1997 switched to KQSN with the slogan "Sunny 92.9" and a switch to adult contemporary. On 2002-03-11, KQSN changed calls to the current KDBL and their country format.
