= KYYW =

Radio station in Abilene, Texas, US

Coordinates: 32°29′26″N 99°45′02″W

- Abilene, Texas; United States
- Broadcast area: Abilene, Texas
- Frequency: 1470 kHz
- Branding: News/Talk 94.7 & 1470

Programming
- Format: News/talk
- Affiliations: ABC News Radio; Compass Media Networks; Premiere Networks; Westwood One

Ownership
- Owner: Townsquare Media; (Townsquare License, LLC)
- Sister stations: KEAN-FM, KEYJ-FM, KMWX, KULL

History
- First air date: 1938
- Former call signs: KRBC (1938–1984); KFQX (1984–1989); KNTS(1989–1997); KBBA (1997–1999); KEAN (1999–2003); KVVZ (2003–2004)

Technical information
- Licensing authority: FCC
- Facility ID: 40997
- Class: D
- Power: 5,000 watts day 125 watts night
- Translator: 94.7 K234DA (Abilene)

Links
- Public license information: Public file; LMS
- Webcast: Listen live
- Website: 1470kyyw.com

KYYW (1470 AM) is a news/talk radio station that serves the Abilene, Texas, area. The station is under ownership of Townsquare Media.

== History ==
The station went on air in 1938 on a local channel. Its former callsign KRBC was made up of the first letters of Reporter Broadcasting Company (RBC). RBC was an affiliate of the Abilene Reporter-News newspaper. In late 1940s, the station changed frequencies to 1470 with 5,000 watts days and 1,000 watts at night using a three tower directional antenna located north of Abilene. Studios were in a downtown hotel for many years. KRBC radio later moved in with KRBC-TV (channel 9) on south 14th street.

KRBC was spun off to some of its shareholders (members of the Fox family) in 1986. They later acquired an FM in nearby Merkel, Texas, which is today's KHXS (102.7). Scion Shane Fox went on to found Maxagrid, a maker of ratings analysis software. He later owned many central Texas stations.

KYYW changed formats from classic country to news/talk on Monday, March 1, 2010. The classic country format moved to sister station KSLI. This corresponded to the change in ownership from Gap West to Townsquare Media.

On Thursday, November 26, 2020, at 12:30 a.m., translator K234DA signed on the air at 94.7 megahertz and began simulcasting 1470 AM.
