= KEYJ-FM =

Coordinates: 32.277°N 99.594°W

- Abilene, Texas; United States
- Broadcast area: Abilene, Texas
- Frequency: 107.9 MHz
- Branding: Rock 108

Programming
- Format: Mainstream rock
- Affiliations: Compass Media Networks; United Stations Radio Networks

Ownership
- Owner: Townsquare Media; (Townsquare License, LLC)
- Sister stations: KEAN-FM, KMWX, KULL, KYYW

History
- First air date: 1957

Technical information
- Licensing authority: FCC
- Facility ID: 17804
- Class: C1
- ERP: 100,000 watts
- HAAT: 270 meters (890 ft)

Links
- Public license information: Public file; LMS
- Webcast: Listen Live
- Website: keyj.com

KEYJ-FM (107.9 MHz) is a commercial radio station located in Abilene, Texas. KEYJ-FM currently airs a mainstream rock format branded as "Rock 108", successfully blending "the best of the old and the new." The "Rock 108" branding came about around early 1989 as "The Home of Rock n Roll". This brought about a classic/current AOR format from its previous "Pop40" branded "Key-J 108". The station owners in the 1980s and 1990s were Lloyd Mynat (who played professional football at one time) and Dave Boyal. The station is currently owned and operated by Townsquare Media.

Before 1979, the call letters KEYJ were assigned to a station located in Jamestown, North Dakota broadcasting at 1400 AM (now KQDJ), which gained brief fame in 1957, when it was featured in Life Magazine, as the home of the "World's Youngest D-J", Shadoe Stevens.

KEYJ won the RadioContraband Rock Radio Award for the "Under the Radar" station of the Year in 2014.
