= KTSR =

- DeQuincy, Louisiana; United States
- Broadcast area: Lake Charles, Louisiana; Southwest Louisiana
- Frequency: 92.1 MHz
- Branding: Power 92.1

Programming
- Format: Christian adult contemporary
- Affiliations: Salem Media Group

Ownership
- Owner: Townsquare Media; (Townsquare License, LLC)
- Sister stations: KHLA, KJMH, KLCL, KNGT

History
- First air date: November 1, 1985
- Former call signs: KROK (1985–2003); KNUF (2003–2004)
- Call sign meaning: play on the word "Star" (former branding)

Technical information
- Licensing authority: FCC
- Facility ID: 71555
- Class: C3
- ERP: 13,500 watts
- HAAT: 136.7 meters (448 ft)
- Transmitter coordinates: 30°13′16.0″N 93°18′40.0″W

Links
- Public license information: Public file; LMS
- Webcast: Listen live
- Website: power921lc.com

KTSR (92.1 FM, "Power 92.1") is a Christian adult contemporary formatted broadcast radio station licensed to DeQuincy, Louisiana, serving Southwest Louisiana. KTSR is owned and operated by Townsquare Media. The station's studios are located on North Lakeshore Drive, just northwest of downtown Lake Charles, and its transmitter is located in Sulphur, Louisiana.

== History ==
The station first signed-on on November 1, 1985 as KROK. From 2004 to 2017, it aired a Top 40 format, both as "Star 92.1" from 2004 to 2009 and as "92.1 Kiss FM" from 2009 to 2017. In 2017, the station shifted to classic rock as “Classic Rock 92.1”.

On May 22, 2020, at 4:00 PM, Townsquare Media changed the classic rock format to Hot AC as the new “92.1 The Bridge”.

Previous logo

On October 5, 2020, KTSR changed their format from hot adult contemporary to urban adult contemporary, branded as "Magic 92.1" (format moved from KLCL 1470 AM Lake Charles, which went silent).

On August 7, 2024, KTSR flipped to Christian adult contemporary as "Power 92.1", using programming from Salem Media Group's "Today's Christian Music" network. The flip now puts the station in competition with Educational Media Foundation's KRLR. Urban adult contemporary continues to be served in the market by KZWA.
