= KMGW (FM) =

- Naches, Washington; United States
- Broadcast area: Yakima, Washington
- Frequency: 99.3 MHz
- Branding: MegaHits 99.3

Programming
- Format: Classic hits
- Affiliations: Compass Media Networks

Ownership
- Owner: Townsquare Media; (Townsquare License, LLC)
- Sister stations: KATS, KDBL, KFFM, KIT

History
- First air date: 2000 (as KREW-FM)
- Former call signs: KBMU (5/10/1999-5/26/1999, CP); KREW-FM (1999–2002); KQSN (2002–2008); KQMY (2008–2012); KIT-FM (2012–2015)
- Call sign meaning: K MeGaHits Washington

Technical information
- Licensing authority: FCC
- Facility ID: 88006
- Class: A
- ERP: 790 watts
- HAAT: 274 meters (899 ft)
- Transmitter coordinates: 46°36′2.00″N 120°52′6.00″W

Links
- Public license information: Public file; LMS
- Webcast: Listen Live
- Website: mega993online.com

KMGW (99.3 MHz) is an FM radio station broadcasting a classic hits format. Licensed to Naches, Washington, United States, the station is currently owned by Townsquare Media.

== History ==
The station signed on as KREW-FM in 1999, before changing its call letters to KQSN in 2002. By that year, 99.3 had a classic hits format as "99.3 The Hawk". In 2006, KQSN flipped to Spanish Oldies, as "La Preciosa". On April 2, 2008, after Clear Channel sold the station to GapWest Broadcasting, KQSN flipped to adult hits as "My 99.3". Prior to this, KQSN had been simulcasting KDBL after the sale closed three months earlier. On November 17, 2011, KQMY changed their format to news/talk, simulcasting KIT 1280 AM.

On February 17, 2012, KQMY changed their call letters to KIT-FM.

On September 18, 2015, 99.3 flipped to rhythmic oldies as "Mega 99.3" with a callsign change to KMGW. KMGW was also Yakima's affiliate for Slow Jams with R. Dub, which previously aired on KFFM-107.3 (Yakima only gets the Sunday night version on KFFM-107.3 as of 2019.)

On February 1, 2019, the rhythmic oldies format was replaced by a classic hits format known as 'MegaHits,' most likely designed to compete against their Radio Yakima competitor KARY-FM.
