= KFFM =

Yakima, Washington; United States
- Broadcast area: Wenatchee–Yakima–Moses Lake, and the Lower Yakima Valley
- Frequency: 107.3 MHz
- Branding: 107-3 KFFM

Programming
- Format: Top 40
- Affiliations: Compass Media Networks; Premiere Networks

Ownership
- Owner: Townsquare Media; (Townsquare License, LLC)
- Sister stations: KATS; KDBL; KIT; KMGW

History
- First air date: September 1970
- Former call signs: KMWX-FM (1970–1972)

Technical information
- Licensing authority: FCC
- Facility ID: 49723
- Class: C
- ERP: 100,000 watts
- HAAT: 461 meters (1,512 feet)
- Transmitter coordinates: 46°38′25.5″N 120°23′49.2″W

Links
- Public license information: Public file; LMS
- Webcast: Listen live
- Website: kffm.com

KFFM (107.3 FM) is a radio station broadcasting a top 40 format. The station is licensed to Yakima, Washington, United States. The station is owned by Townsquare Media.

== Tower and coverage area ==
KFFM's tower is located slightly northeast of Yakima. Its signal reaches Cle Elum, Ellensburg, Wenatchee and Moses Lake, Washington.

== DJs ==
Baby Joel and Reesha in the Morning, Rik Mikals, John Riggs, D-Rez, Ryan Seacrest, Kid Kelly
