= KKYR-FM =

Radio station in Texarkana, Texas

Coordinates: 33.430°N 94.086°W

- Texarkana, Texas; United States
- Broadcast area: Texarkana area
- Frequency: 102.5 MHz
- Branding: Kicker 102-5

Programming
- Language: English
- Format: Country
- Affiliations: Compass Media Networks; Performance Racing Network

Ownership
- Owner: Townsquare Media; (Townsquare License, LLC)
- Sister stations: KMJI; KPWW; KYGL

History
- First air date: July 15, 1965
- Former call signs: KOSY-FM (1965–1989)
- Call sign meaning: Pronounced "Kicker"

Technical information
- Licensing authority: FCC
- Facility ID: 7066
- Class: C1
- ERP: 100,000 watts
- HAAT: 140 meters (460 ft)

Links
- Public license information: Public file; LMS
- Webcast: Listen live
- Website: kkyr.com

KKYR-FM (102.5 MHz, "Kicker 102-5") is a country music-formatted radio station licensed to serve Texarkana, Texas. It is currently under the ownership of Townsquare Media. Studios are located along Arkansas Boulevard on the Arkansas side of the city, and the transmitter is on the Texas side, in the western portions of the city south of Westlawn Drive.

== History ==
The station first signed on the air on July 15, 1965, as KOSY-FM, airing an automated beautiful music format as the FM sister station to KOSY (790 AM). Beginning in July 1980, it was a Top 40 format. In 1982, the format changed to adult contemporary. The format continued throughout the 1980s as "Y102", and was Shreveport's dominant affiliate for Rick Dees Weekly Top 40. KOSY-FM became KKYR in 1989 but retained its adult contemporary format until 1990 when it became a country music station.
