= KYGL =

- Texarkana, Arkansas; United States
- Broadcast area: Texarkana, Texas–Arkansas
- Frequency: 106.3 MHz
- Branding: Eagle 106.3

Programming
- Format: Classic rock
- Affiliations: Compass Media Networks; United Stations Radio Networks

Ownership
- Owner: Townsquare Media; (Townsquare License, LLC)
- Sister stations: KKYR-FM, KMJI, KPWW

History
- First air date: 1990
- Former call signs: KUKB (1990–1995)
- Call sign meaning: "Eagle"

Technical information
- Licensing authority: FCC
- Facility ID: 12312
- Class: C2
- ERP: 50,000 watts
- HAAT: 150 meters (490 ft)
- Transmitter coordinates: 33°18′30″N 93°56′54″W

Links
- Public license information: Public file; LMS
- Webcast: Listen live
- Website: kygl.com

KYGL (106.3 FM) is a radio station broadcasting a classic rock format. Licensed to Texarkana, Arkansas, United States, it serves the Texarkana area. The station is currently owned by Townsquare Media. Studios are located on Arkansas Boulevard in Texarkana, Arkansas and its transmitter is southeast of the city.

Former logo
