= KATS =

Yakima, Washington; United States
- Broadcast area: Yakima, Washington
- Frequency: 94.5 MHz
- Branding: Yakima's Rock Station

Programming
- Format: Mainstream rock
- Affiliations: Compass Media Networks; United Stations Radio Networks

Ownership
- Owner: Townsquare Media; (Townsquare License, LLC)
- Sister stations: KDBL, KFFM, KIT, KMGW

History
- First air date: December 15, 1968 (as KIT-FM)
- Former call signs: KIT-FM (1968–1979)

Technical information
- Licensing authority: FCC
- Facility ID: 64397
- Class: C1
- ERP: 100,000 watts
- HAAT: 277 meters
- Transmitter coordinates: 46°31′59″N 120°30′14″W
- Repeater: 94.3 K232CV (Ellensburg)

Links
- Public license information: Public file; LMS
- Webcast: Listen Live
- Website: katsfm.com

KATS (94.5 FM) is a radio station broadcasting a mainstream rock format. Licensed to Yakima, Washington, United States, the station serves Yakima and Kittitas Counties. The station is currently owned by Townsquare Media.

== Translators ==
In addition to the main station, KATS is relayed by an additional translator to widen its broadcast area.

Call sign	Frequency	City of license	FID	ERP (W)	Class	FCC info
K232CV	94.3 FM	Ellensburg, Washington	64360	36	D	LMS
