= KPWW =

Radio station in Hooks, Texas

- Hooks, Texas; United States
- Broadcast area: Texarkana, Texas–Arkansas
- Frequency: 95.9 MHz
- Branding: Power 95-9

Programming
- Language: English
- Format: Top 40 (CHR)
- Affiliations: Compass Media Networks; Westwood One

Ownership
- Owner: Townsquare Media; (Townsquare License, LLC)
- Sister stations: KKYR-FM, KMJI, KYGL

History
- Call sign meaning: "Power"

Technical information
- Licensing authority: FCC
- Facility ID: 65292
- Class: C3
- ERP: 11,500 watts
- HAAT: 148.0 meters (485.6 ft)
- Transmitter coordinates: 33°27′25.00″N 94°10′59.00″W

Links
- Public license information: Public file; LMS
- Webcast: Listen Live
- Website: power959.com

KPWW (95.9 MHz, "Power 95-9") is an American radio station broadcasting a Top 40 (CHR) format. Licensed to Hooks, Texas, United States, it serves the Texarkana area. The station is currently owned by Townsquare Media. Studios are located on Arkansas Boulevard in Texarkana, Arkansas and its transmitter is in Red Lick, Texas.
