= KWFS-FM =

Coordinates: 33.898°N 98.543°W

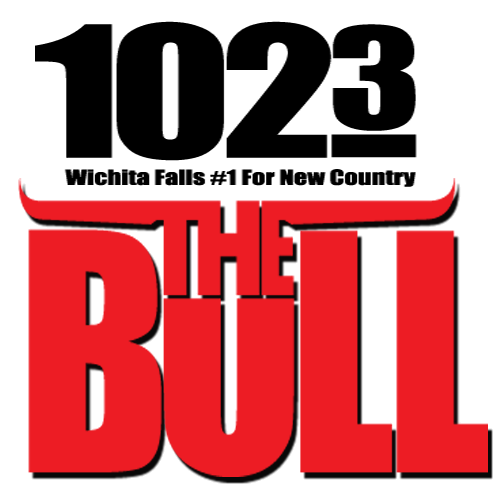
- Wichita Falls, Texas; United States
- Broadcast area: Wichita Falls metropolitan area
- Frequency: 102.3 kHz
- Branding: 102.3 The Bull

Programming
- Format: Modern country
- Affiliations: Compass Media Networks; Premiere Networks

Ownership
- Owner: Townsquare Media; (Townsquare License, LLC)
- Sister stations: KBZS, KNIN-FM, KWFS-AM

History
- First air date: 1961 (as KNTO at 95.1)
- Former call signs: KNTO (1961–1980); KNTO-FM (5/1980-9/1980); KKQV (1980–1990); KWFS (1990–1995)
- Former frequencies: 95.1 MHz (1961–1973); 103.3 MHz (1973–1998)
- Call sign meaning: K Wichita FallS

Technical information
- Licensing authority: FCC
- Facility ID: 1722
- Class: C1
- ERP: 100,000 watts
- HAAT: 137 meters (449 ft)

Links
- Public license information: Public file; LMS
- Webcast: Listen Live
- Website: 1023thebullfm.com

KWFS-FM (102.3 MHz branded as "102.3 The Bull") is a radio station serving the Wichita Falls area with a modern country format. It is under ownership of Townsquare Media.

== History ==
KNTO-FM, the first FM station in the Wichita Falls area, went on air in August 1961, owned by a partnership of five local businessmen including Bob Lipscomb, Bill Thacker, and three others, and the station's callsign stood for "North Texas and Oklahoma".. KNTO operated from the Onaway Trail tower, still used today, on 95.1 MHz with 3,100 watts horizontal only at 430 feet above average terrain. Studios were on Galveston Drive (near present I-44) before moving to the Onaway Trail building. The format was easy listening/beautiful music.

The station was not an instant success. There was some income from Muzak brand background music played on the station's SCA channel.

Oilman Stephen M. Gose bought the station in 1965, and sold in 1968. The next owners were a partnership of Ralph C. Parker, owner of Mobile Phone of Texas, Inc., and Joe Edd Sweatt, a local general contractor, who had recently built Mr. Gose's new residence. They hired a new manager, Bill Spurgeon, who took the station to hard rock. The KNTO call letters stayed but the logo was modified to include a peace symbol. The station gained popularity with the younger generation, but not with advertisers. The format was changed to "Conservative Contemporary". Local DJs during the hard rock era for the station included Bill Daniels.

In 1973, the station was sold to WDAS AM/FM Philadelphia owner Max M. Leon, and his son Steve, who owned WDAS-AM-FM in Philadelphia. The station filed for and received a grant to move to 103.3 MHz with 100,000 watts horizontal and vertical at 450 feet. In 1977 the format was changed to smooth jazz, and in 1977 to Disco-rock.

The FCC investigated some character qualification issues at WDAS. The renewal of KNTO was delayed. In 1978 a deal was struck to sell KNTO to AM 990 KNIN. This was never approved at the FCC. In 1980 a sale was allowed to "Sunshine Radio", a partnership of the Dorsey radio interests and the holdings of Anthony Brandon. They relaunched the station as "QV-103" KKQV with an album-leaning Top 40 format. The station dropped Texas State Network in favor of RKO Radio. Its album-leaning Top 40 formula would later upgrade its format to CHR. At the time, KKQV was the dominant CHR station in Wichita Falls, despite Wichita Falls having 2 Top 40 stations, with the other being KNIN.

KKQV then acquired 1290 AM KTRN from Sammons-Ruff Communications in 1980. In 1985 KTRN changed its call sign to KLLF (King's Life 1290) and changed formats to Christian. In 1988 it changed formats again to Spanish language making it the first Spanish language station in Wichita Falls, later to News/Talk which it remains today. Known now as NewsTalk 1290. In 1990, 103.3 KKQV changed its calls to KWFS with oldies, then to country. In 1995, KWFS was adopted as the 1290 AM letters, and an -FM suffix was added to the FM.

The station changed channels in 1998 to 102.3 as part of a frequency shuffle that put 103.3 on-air as a rimshotter of Dallas-Fort Worth.

On November 15, 2012, KWFS-FM rebranded as "102.3 Blake FM".

On March 31, 2017, KWFS-FM rebranded as "102.3 The Bull".
