= Red Lick, Texas =

- City
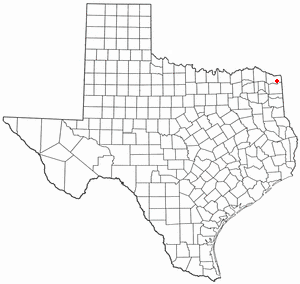
- Location of Red Lick, Texas

- Coordinates: 33°27′56″N 94°10′05″W
- Country: United States
- State: Texas
- County: Bowie

Area
  - Total: 1.93 sq mi (4.99 km^{2})
  - Land: 1.82 sq mi (4.71 km^{2})
  - Water: 0.11 sq mi (0.28 km^{2})
- Elevation: 361 ft (110 m)

Population (2020)
  - Total: 946
  - Density: 556/sq mi (214.6/km^{2})
- Time zone: UTC-6 (Central (CST))
  - Summer (DST): UTC-5 (CDT)
- Area codes: 903, 430
- FIPS code: 48-61172
- GNIS feature ID: 2411528
- Website: cityofredlicktx.com

Red Lick is a city in Bowie County, Texas, United States. It is part of the Texarkana metropolitan area. Its population was 1,008 at the 2010 census and 946 in 2020.

== Geography ==
Red Lick is located in eastern Bowie County, 9 miles (14 km) northwest of downtown Texarkana. Interstate 30 touches the southern border of the city, but the nearest access is either from Nash to the east or Leary to the west. According to the United States Census Bureau, the city has a total area of 1.9 square miles (5.0 km^{2}), of which 0.12 sq mi (0.3 km^{2}), or 5.66%, is covered by water.

== Demographics ==
Historical population
| Census | Pop. | Note | %± |
|---|---|---|---|
| 2000 | 853 | | — |
| 2010 | 1,008 | | 18.2% |
| 2020 | 946 | | −6.2% |
U.S. Decennial Census

=== 2020 census ===
As of the 2020 census, Red Lick had a population of 946 and a median age of 46.1 years, with 19.9% of residents under 18 and 22.1% of residents 65 or older. For every 100 females there were 96.3 males, and for every 100 females age 18 and over there were 97.9 males age 18 and over.

71.2% of residents lived in urban areas, while 28.8% lived in rural areas.

There were 392 households in Red Lick, of which 32.9% had children under the age of 18 living in them. Of all households, 62.8% were married-couple households, 12.0% were households with a male householder and no spouse or partner present, and 20.9% were households with a female householder and no spouse or partner present. About 19.6% of all households were made up of individuals and 13.0% had someone living alone who was 65 years of age or older.

There were 398 housing units, of which 1.5% were vacant. The homeowner vacancy rate was 0.3% and the rental vacancy rate was 0.0%.

Racial composition as of the 2020 census
| Race | Number | Percent |
|---|---|---|
| White | 811 | 85.7% |
| Black or African American | 39 | 4.1% |
| American Indian and Alaska Native | 9 | 1.0% |
| Asian | 5 | 0.5% |
| Native Hawaiian and Other Pacific Islander | 3 | 0.3% |
| Some other race | 20 | 2.1% |
| Two or more races | 59 | 6.2% |
| Hispanic or Latino (of any race) | 42 | 4.4% |

=== 2000 census ===
According to the 2000 U.S. census, 853 people, 302 households, and 266 families resided in the city. The population density was 442.8 inhabitants per square mile (171.0/km^{2}). The 315 housing units had an average density of 163.5/sq mi (63.1/km^{2}). The racial makeup of the city was 95.08% White, 3.17% African American, 0.47% Native American, 0.12% Asian, 0.35% from other races, and 0.82% from two or more races. Hispanics or Latinos of any race were 0.94% of the population.

Of the 302 households, 44.0% had children under 18 living with them, 78.1% were married couples living together, 7.3% had a female householder with no husband present, and 11.6% were not families. About 10.6% of all households were made up of individuals, and 3.0% had someone living alone who was 65 or older. The average household size was 2.82 and the average family size was 3.03.

In the city, the age distribution was 30.0% under 18, 5.2% from 18 to 24, 26.8% from 25 to 44, 30.7% from 45 to 64, and 7.3% who were 65 or older. The median age was 37 years. For every 100 females, there were 97.0 males. For every 100 females 18 and over, there were 87.7 males.

The median income for a household in the city was $57,045 and for a family was $60,313. Males had a median income of $50,909 versus $23,333 for females. The per capita income for the city was $22,703. About 4.1% of families and 3.9% of the population were below the poverty line, including 2.6% of those under 18 and 10.9% of those 65 or over.

== Education ==
Red Lick is served by the Red Lick Independent School District.
