= Southwest Louisiana =

Coordinates: 30.4°N 93.2°W

- Region
- West Acadiana
- Five-parish Southwest Louisiana region (Allen, Beauregard, Calcasieu, Cameron, and Jefferson Davis) highlighted in red.
- Country: United States
- State: Louisiana
- Largest city: Lake Charles

Population (2020)
  - Total: 313,951

Southwest Louisiana (SWLA) is a five-parish area intersecting the Acadiana and Central Louisiana regions in the U.S. state of Louisiana. It is composed of the following parishes (counties): Allen, Beauregard, Calcasieu, Cameron, and Jefferson Davis. As of 2020, the combined population of the five parish area was 313,951.

Southwest Louisiana has one metropolitan area: Lake Charles. The southwestern portion of Louisiana is also geographically and culturally attached to Southeast Texas.

Three of the parishes — Calcasieu, Cameron, and Jefferson Davis — are also part of Acadiana, the region of French and Acadian influence defined by the Louisiana State Legislature in 1971.

== Southwest Louisiana cities ==
Some major cities include

Cities	Rank	Parish	Population (2025 consensus)
Lake Charles	1	Calcasieu	76,135
Sulphur	2	Calcasieu	19,457
Moss Bluff	3	Calcasieu	11,588
DeRidder	4	Beauregard	9,438
Jennings	5	Jefferson Davis	9,079
Prien	6	Calcasieu	8,455
Fort Polk South	7	Allen	8,149
Oakdale	8	Allen	6,281
Carlyss	9	Calcasieu	5,105
Westlake	10	Calcasieu	4,469

== Broader definition ==
"Southwest Louisiana" is often used to represent a broader region that includes parishes farther east.

The most prominent example is the college now known as the University of Louisiana at Lafayette. Until 1998, UL was known as the University of Southwestern Louisiana, the Southwestern Louisiana Institute, and the Southwestern Louisiana Industrial Institute — despite being located in Lafayette, a city roughly 40 miles east of the five-parish area defined here. Its athletic teams were often referred to simply as "Southwestern."

The Southwest Louisiana Zydeco Festival, the Greater Southwest Louisiana Mardi Gras Association, and the Greater Southwest Louisiana Black Chamber of Commerce are all based in Lafayette or the surrounding area, not near Lake Charles.

== See also ==
- Intrastate regions
