= Media in Aurora, Colorado =

Aurora is a center of media in north-central Colorado. The following is a list of media outlets based in the city.

== Print ==
=== Newspapers ===
The Aurora Sentinel is the city's primary newspaper, published weekly. Given Aurora's proximity to Denver, local readers can also purchase the daily print edition of The Denver Post.

Other newspapers published in Aurora include:

- Buckley Guardian, Buckley Air Force Base news
- Denver Urban Spectrum, African American news, monthly
- El Hispano, Spanish language newspaper, weekly

== Radio ==
Aurora is in the Denver-Boulder radio market. Local listeners can also receive the signal of radio stations broadcasting from nearby communities including Centennial, Colorado Springs, Greenwood Village, Longmont, and Loveland.

The following is a list of radio stations that broadcast from or are licensed to Aurora.

=== AM ===
Frequency	Callsign	Format	City of License	Notes
560	KLZ	Talk	Denver, Colorado	Broadcasts from Aurora
670	KLTT	Religious	Commerce City, Colorado	Broadcasts from Aurora
710	KNUS	News/Talk	Denver, Colorado	Broadcasts from Aurora
810	KLVZ	Religious	Brighton, Colorado	Broadcasts from Aurora
990	KRKS	Religious	Denver, Colorado	Broadcasts from Aurora
1090	KMXA	Regional Mexican	Aurora, Colorado	Broadcasts from Denver, Colorado
1220	KLDC	Urban Gospel	Denver, Colorado	Broadcasts from Aurora
1430	KAMP	Sports gambling	Aurora, Colorado	Broadcasts from Denver, Colorado
1650	KBJD	Spanish Religious	Denver, Colorado	Broadcasts from Aurora

=== FM ===
Frequency	Callsign	Format	City of License	Notes
89.7	KXGR	Religious	Loveland, Colorado	Broadcasts from Aurora
94.7	KRKS-FM	Religious	Lafayette, Colorado	Broadcasts from Aurora
101.5	KJHM	Rhythmic Adult Contemporary	Strasburg, Colorado	Broadcasts from Aurora
107.1	KFCO	Hip Hop	Bennett, Colorado	Broadcasts from Aurora

== Television ==
Aurora is in the Denver television market. In addition, local viewers can receive the signal of television stations broadcasting from nearby communities including Fort Collins and Greeley.

The following is a list of television stations that broadcast from and/or are licensed to Aurora.

Display Channel	Network	Callsign	City of License	Notes
25.1	Telemundo	KDEN-TV	Longmont, Colorado	Broadcasts from studios in Aurora
25.2	Exitos TV	KDEN-TV	Longmont, Colorado	Broadcasts from studios in Aurora
25.3	Cozi TV	KDEN-TV	Longmont, Colorado	Broadcasts from studios in Aurora
59.1	ION	KPXC-TV	Denver, Colorado	Broadcasts from studios in Aurora
59.2	Qubo	KPXC-TV	Denver, Colorado	Broadcasts from studios in Aurora
59.3	Ion Plus	KPXC-TV	Denver, Colorado	Broadcasts from studios in Aurora
59.4	Shop TV	KPXC-TV	Denver, Colorado	Broadcasts from studios in Aurora
