= Mass media in Denver =

Denver is a major center of media in Colorado and the Mountain West region of the United States. The following is a list of media outlets based in the city.

== Print ==
=== Newspapers ===
The Denver Post is the city's primary newspaper, published daily. Other papers published in the city include:

- The Advocate, University of Colorado Denver student newspaper, weekly
- Rocky Mountain Chinese Weekly, Chinese language newspaper, weekly
- Chinese American Post, Chinese language newspaper, weekly
- Clarion, University of Denver student newspaper, weekly
- Colorado Chinese News, Chinese language newspaper, weekly
- The Colorado Episcopalian, Episcopal Diocese of Colorado newspaper, quarterly
- The Colorado Leader, real estate news, weekly
- The Colorado Sun, online publication founded 2018
- Denver Business Journal, business news, weekly
- Denver Catholic Register, Roman Catholic Archdiocese of Denver newspaper, weekly
- Denver Voice, homeless news, monthly
- Intermountain Jewish News, Jewish American news, weekly
- The Metropolitan, Metropolitan State University of Denver student newspaper, weekly
- El Pueblo Catolico, Roman Catholic Archdiocese of Denver Spanish language newspaper
- Viva Colorado, Spanish language newspaper, weekly
- La Voz Nueva de Colorado, Spanish language newspaper, weekly
- Westword, alternative newspaper, weekly

== Radio ==
Denver is a principal city of the Denver-Boulder radio market. In its Fall 2013 ranking of radio markets by population, Arbitron ranked the Denver-Boulder market 19th in the United States. The market includes seven counties in north-central Colorado: Adams, Arapahoe, Boulder, Broomfield, Denver, Douglas, and Jefferson.

The following is a list of radio stations which broadcast from or are licensed to Denver:

=== AM ===
Frequency	Callsign	Format	City of License	Notes	Ownership
560	KLZ	Talk	Denver	Broadcasts from Aurora, Colorado	Crawford Broadcasting
630	KHOW	News/Talk	Denver	—	iHeartMedia
670	KLTT	Christian talk	Commerce City, Colorado	—	Crawford Broadcasting
710	KNUS	News/Talk	Denver	Broadcasts from Aurora, Colorado	Salem Communications
760	KDFD	Talk	Thornton, Colorado	Broadcasts from Denver	iHeartMedia
780	KLVG	Classic country	Fountain, Colorado	Broadcasts from Denver	—
810	KLVZ	Christian talk	Brighton, Colorado	—	Crawford Broadcasting
850	KOA	News/Talk	Denver	—	iHeartMedia
890	KCEG	Adult standards	Fountain, Colorado	Broadcasts from Denver	—
910	KPOF	Christian contemporary	Denver	Broadcasts from Westminster, Colorado	Pillar of Fire
950	KKSE	Sports talk	Denver	—	Kroenke Sports & Entertainment
990	KRKS	Religious	Denver	Broadcasts from Aurora, Colorado	Salem Communications
1060	KRCN	News/Talk	Longmont, Colorado	—	—
1090	KMXA	Spanish adult contemporary	Aurora, Colorado	Broadcasts from Denver	Entravision
1150	KNRV	Spanish News/Talk	Englewood, Colorado	—	—
1190	KVCU	Freeform	Boulder, Colorado	—	—
1220	KLDC	Christian Talk	Denver	Broadcasts from Aurora, Colorado	Crawford Broadcasting
1280	KBNO	Regional Mexican	Denver	—	—
1340	KDCO	Alternative	Denver	Broadcasts from Centennial, Colorado	Colorado Public Radio
1390	KGNU	Public	Denver	Broadcasts from Boulder, Colorado	—
1430	KAMP	Sports gambling	Aurora, Colorado	Broadcasts from Denver	Audacy
1510	KPLS	Christian	Littleton, Colorado	Broadcasts from Lakewood	—
1550	KKCL	Modern Adult Alternative	Golden, Colorado	Broadcasts from Denver	—
1600	KEPN	Sports	Lakewood, Colorado	—	Bonneville International
1650	KBJD	Spanish Religious	Denver	Broadcasts from Aurora, Colorado	Salem Communications
1690	KDMT	Financial talk	Arvada, Colorado	—	Salem Communications

=== FM ===
!style="background:#ffcccc;"| Frequency
Callsign	Format	City of License	Notes	Ownership	
88.1	KVOD	Classical	Lakewood, Colorado	—	Colorado Public Radio
89.3	KUVO	Jazz	Denver	—	Rocky Mountain PBS
90.1	KCFR-FM	Public	Denver	NPR; broadcasts from Centennial, Colorado	Colorado Public Radio
91.1	KLDV	Contemporary Christian	Morrison, Colorado	—	Educational Media Foundation
92.1	KJMN	Spanish Adult Hits	Castle Rock, Colorado	Broadcasts from Denver	Entravision
92.5	KKSE-FM	Sports	Broomfield, Colorado	Broadcasts from Denver	Kroenke Sports & Entertainment
92.9	K225CZ	Adult Hits	Boulder, Colorado	Translator of 1510 AM	James and Janice Hunt
93.3	KTCL	Alternative rock	Wheat Ridge, Colorado	Broadcasts from Denver	iHeartMedia
93.7	K229BS	Christian	Lakewood, Colorado	Translator of 1510 AM	James and Janice Hunt
94.1	K231BQ	News/Talk	Denver	Translator of 850 AM	iHeartMedia
94.7	KRKS-FM	Christian talk	Lafayette, Colorado	—	Salem Communications
95.7	KDHT	Mainstream top 40	Denver	—	iHeartMedia
96.5	KXPK	Regional Mexican	Evergreen, Colorado	Broadcasts from Denver	Entravision
96.9	K245AD	Modern adult alternative	Arvada, Colorado	Translator of KKCL	—
97.3	KBCO	Adult album alternative	Boulder, Colorado	Broadcasts from Denver	iHeartMedia
98.5	KYGO-FM	Country	Denver	Broadcasts from Greenwood Village, Colorado	Bonneville International
99.5	KQMT	Classic rock	Denver	—	Audacy
100.3	KIMN	Hot adult contemporary	Denver	—	Kroenke Sports & Entertainment
101.1	KOSI	Adult contemporary	Denver	—	Bonneville International
101.5	KJHM	Rhythmic hot AC	Strasburg, Colorado	—	Max Media
101.9	KXWA	Contemporary Christian	Centennial, Colorado	—	Way FM
102.3	KVOQ	Alternative	Greenwood Village, Colorado	—	Colorado Public Radio
103.1	K276FK	Comedy	Denver	Translator of KALC HD2	Audacy
103.5	KRFX	Classic rock	Denver	—	iHeartMedia
104.3	KKFN-FM	Sports talk	Longmont, Colorado	—	Bonneville International
105.1	KXKL-FM	Classic hits	Denver	—	Kroenke Sports & Entertainment
105.5	KJAC	Adult album alternative	Timnath, Colorado	broadcasts from Fort Collins, Colorado, has translator in Denver	Community Radio for Northern Colorado
105.9	KALC	Top 40	Denver	—	Audacy
106.3	K292FM	Country	Denver	Translator of KYGO-FM	Bonneville International
106.7	KWBL	Country	Denver	—	iHeartMedia
107.1	KFCO	Classic hip hop	Bennett, Colorado	—	Max Media
107.5	KQKS	Rhythmic contemporary	Lakewood, Colorado	—	Audacy
107.9	KBPI	Active rock	Fort Collins, Colorado	Broadcasts from Denver, has translator in Denver on same frequency	iHeartMedia

Local listeners can also receive the signal of radio stations broadcasting from nearby communities including Aurora, Centennial, Colorado Springs, Greenwood Village, Longmont, and Loveland.

== Television ==
The Denver television market includes the northern half of Colorado, and portions of eastern Wyoming and the Nebraska Panhandle. In its Fall 2023 ranking of television markets by population, Arbitron ranked the Denver market 17th in the United States.

The following is a list of television stations that broadcast from or are licensed to Denver, with network owned-and-operated stations highlighted in bold:

Display Channel	Network	Callsign	City of License	Notes
2.1	CW	**KWGN-TV**	Denver	—
2.2	This TV	**KWGN-TV**	Denver	—
2.3	Comet	**KWGN-TV**		
2.4	Charge!	**KWGN-TV**		
3.1	Independent	KCDO-TV	Sterling, Colorado	—
3.2	Grit		Sterling, Colorado	—
4.1	CBS	**KCNC-TV**	Denver	—
4.2	Start TV	KCNC-DT2		
5.1	Sonlife	KRDH-LD	Denver	—
5.2	Azteca	KRDH-LD	Denver	—
5.3	Cheddar	KRDH-LD	Denver	—
6	ESPN Deportes Radio	KXDP-LD	Denver	—
6.1	PBS	KRMA-TV	Denver	—
6.2	PBS Kids	KRMA-TV	Denver	—
6.3	Create/World	KRMA-TV	Denver	—
7.1	ABC	KMGH-TV	Denver	—
7.2	Court TV Mystery	**KZCO-LD**	Denver	—
7.3	Laff		Denver	
7.4	7 News	KMGH-TV	Denver	Local news and weather
9.1	NBC	KUSA	Denver	—
9.2	WeatherNation TV	KUSA	Denver	—
9.3	Justice Network			
9.4	NBC (UHF Signal)			
9.5	Quest			
10.1	CTN	KSBS-CD	Denver	—
10.2	CTNi	KSBS-CD	Denver	—
10.3	Aliento Vision	KSBS-CD	Denver	—
12.1	PBS	KBDI-TV	Broomfield, Colorado	Broadcasts from studios in Denver
12.2	PBS Encore	KBDI-TV	Broomfield, Colorado	Broadcasts from studios in Denver
12.3	MHz WorldView	KBDI-TV	Broomfield, Colorado	Broadcasts from studios in Denver
12.4	NHK World	KBDI-TV	Broomfield, Colorado	Broadcasts from studios in Denver
14.1	Univision	KCEC-DT	Boulder, Colorado	Broadcasts from studios in Denver
14.2	Bounce TV	KCEC-DT	Boulder, Colorado	Broadcasts from studios in Denver
14.3	GetTV	KCEC-DT	Boulder, Colorado	Broadcasts from studios in Denver
14.4	Escape			
16.1	HSN	KHDT-LD	Denver	—
20.1	MyNetworkTV	KTVD	Denver	—
20.2	Me-TV	KTVD	Denver	—
23.1	EWTN	KDEO-LD	Denver	—
23.2	—	KDEO-LD	Denver	Oorah TV
23.3	—	KDEO-LD	Denver	Torah TV
23.4	—	KDEO-LD	Denver	Calvary
23.5	—	KDEO-LD	Denver	Fuente de Vida
23.6	—	KDEO-LD	Denver	The Walk TV
25.1	Telemundo	KMAS-LD	Denver	Translator of **KDEN-TV**, Longmont, Colorado
25.2	TeleXitos	KMAS-LD	Denver	Translator of **KDEN-TV**, Longmont, Colorado
25.3	Cozi TV	KMAS-LD	Denver	Translator of **KDEN-TV**, Longmont, Colorado
26.1	Movies	KHDT-LD	Denver	—
26.2	Heroes and Icons	KHDT-LD	Denver	—
26.3	QVC	KHDT-LD	Denver	
26.4	—	KHDT-LD	Denver	
26.5	—	KHDT-LD	Denver	
28.1	HSN	KLPD-LD	Denver	—
28.2	BizTV	KLPD-LD	Denver	—
28.3	Movies!	KLPD-LD	Denver	Simulcast of KCDO-TV, Sterling, Colorado
28.4	—	KLPD-LD	Denver	Thunderhill TV
28.5	TV Scout	KLPD-LD	Denver	—
31.1	FOX	KDVR	Denver	—
31.2	Antenna TV	KDVR	Denver	—
31.3	TBD	KDVR	Denver	
39.1	MundoFox	KQDK-CD	Denver	Satellite station of KQCK, Cheyenne, Wyoming
41.1	Daystar	KRMT	Denver	—
50.1	UniMás	**KCEC**	Denver	—
50.2	LATV	**KCEC**	Denver	—
50.3	Stadium			
53.1	Estrella TV	**KETD**	Castle Rock, Colorado	Broadcasts from studios in Denver
53.2	LeSEA	**KETD**	Castle Rock, Colorado	Broadcasts from studios in Denver
59.1	ION	KPXC-TV	Denver	Broadcasts from studios in Aurora, Colorado
59.2	Bounce TV	KPXC-TV	Denver	
59.3	Court TV	KPXC-TV	Denver	
59.4	Defy TV	KPXC-TV	Denver	

In addition, local viewers can receive the signal of television stations broadcasting from nearby communities including Fort Collins and Greeley.
