= Media in Longmont, Colorado =

Longmont is a center of media in north-central Colorado. The following is a list of media outlets based in the city.

== Print ==
=== Newspapers ===
The Longmont Leader was a local news website operating from 2020 to 2024.

The Longmont Times-Call while bearing the city's name is published from Boulder and is operated by Alden Global Capital of New York City.

== Radio ==
Longmont is in the Denver-Boulder radio market. Local listeners can also receive the signal of radio stations broadcasting from nearby communities including Centennial, Fort Collins, Greeley, Greenwood Village, and Loveland.

The following is a list of radio stations that broadcast from and/or are licensed to Longmont.

=== AM ===
Frequency	Callsign	Format	City of License	Notes
1060	KRCN	Catholic	Longmont, Colorado	-
1170	KJJD	Regional Mexican	Windsor, Colorado	Broadcasts from Longmont

=== FM ===
Frequency	Callsign	Format	City of License	Notes
90.7	KGUD	Easy Listening	Longmont, Colorado	-
93.9	KCWA	Christian Contemporary	Loveland, Colorado	WAY-FM Network; Broadcasts from Longmont
98.1	K251AB	Country	Longmont, Colorado	Translator of KYGO-FM, Denver, Colorado
101.9	KXWA	Christian Contemporary	Centennial, Colorado	WAY-FM Network; Broadcasts from Longmont
104.3	KKFN	Sports	Longmont, Colorado	Broadcasts from Greenwood Village, Colorado

== Television ==
Longmont is in the Denver television market. In addition, local viewers can receive the signal of television stations broadcasting from nearby communities including Fort Collins and Greeley.

The following is a list of television stations that broadcast from and/or are licensed to Longmont.

Display Channel	Network	Callsign	City of License	Notes
25.1	Telemundo	KDEN-TV	Longmont, Colorado	Broadcasts from studios in Aurora, Colorado
25.2	Exitos TV	KDEN-TV	Longmont, Colorado	Broadcasts from studios in Aurora, Colorado
25.3	Cozi TV	KDEN-TV	Longmont, Colorado	Broadcasts from studios in Aurora, Colorado
