= Media in Cheyenne, Wyoming =

Print and broadcast media outlets in Cheyenne, Wyoming

Cheyenne is one of the most populous markets in Wyoming, with a long history of forums and outlets for information. As of 2021, Torrington and Scottsbluff are generally thought to be included in the Cheyenne market.

== Print ==
=== Newspapers ===
The Wyoming Tribune Eagle is the city's primary newspaper, published daily. Other newspapers published in the city include:

- The Cheyenne Post, weekly, community news
- Warren Sentinel, weekly, military news
- Wyoming Business Report, monthly, business news

== Radio ==
In its Fall 2013 ranking of radio markets by population, Arbitron ranked Cheyenne 271st in the United States.

The following is a list of radio stations licensed to and/or broadcasting from Cheyenne.

=== AM ===
Frequency	Callsign	Format	City of License	Notes
650	KGAB	News/Talk	Orchard Valley, Wyoming	Broadcasts from Cheyenne
870	KJMP	Oldies	Pierce, Colorado	Broadcasts from Cheyenne
1240	KFBC	News/Talk	Cheyenne, Wyoming	-
1480	KRAE	Oldies	Cheyenne, Wyoming	-

=== FM ===
Frequency	Callsign	Format	City of License	Notes
88.1	KVAM		Cheyenne, Wyoming	
90.3	KWYC	Religious	Cheyenne, Wyoming	CSN
92.3	KYOY	Classic Hits	Hillsdale, Wyoming	Broadcasts from Cheyenne
92.9	KPAW	Hot Adult Contemporary	F. E. Warren AFB, Wyoming	Broadcasts from Cheyenne
93.7	KAZY	Active Rock	Cheyenne, Wyoming	-
94.7	K234AH	Oldies	Cheyenne, Wyoming	Rebroadcast of KRAE
97.9	KXBG	Country	Cheyenne, Wyoming	Broadcasts from Loveland, Colorado
99.9	KKPL	Hot Adult Contemporary	Cheyenne, Wyoming	Broadcasts from Windsor, Colorado
100.7	KOLT-FM	Country	Cheyenne, Wyoming	Broadcasts from Loveland, Colorado
101.9	KIGN	Classic Rock	Burns, Wyoming	Broadcasts from Cheyenne
103.3	KRAN	Country	F. E. Warren AFB, Wyoming	Broadcasts from Cheyenne
104.9	KRRR	Oldies	Cheyenne, Wyoming	-
106.3	KLEN	Top 40	Cheyenne, Wyoming	-
107.1	K296FZ	Classic Hits	Cheyenne, Wyoming	Rebroadcast of KYOY

The city also receives radio stations from Laramie, as well as Denver and Fort Collins, Colorado.

== Television ==
The Cheyenne television market includes Goshen and Laramie Counties in southeastern Wyoming as well as Scotts Bluff County, Nebraska.

The following is a list of television stations that broadcast from and/or are licensed to the city.

Display Channel	Network	Callsign	City of License	Notes
5.1	CBS	KGWN-TV	Cheyenne, Wyoming	-
5.2	NBC	KGWN-TV	Cheyenne, Wyoming	-
5.3	CW	KGWN-TV	Cheyenne, Wyoming	-
8.1	PBS	K36JO-D	Cheyenne, Wyoming	Translator of KCWC-TV, Riverton, Wyoming
8.2	Create/PBS Encore	K36JO-D	Cheyenne, Wyoming	Translator of KCWC-TV, Riverton, Wyoming
13.1	NBC	KCHY-LP	Cheyenne, Wyoming	High-definition; Satellite station of KCWY-DT, Casper, Wyoming
13.2	NBC	KCHY-LP	Cheyenne, Wyoming	Standard-definition
16.1	ABC	KKTQ-LD	Cheyenne, Wyoming	Translator of KTWO-TV, Casper, Wyoming
27.1	FOX	KLWY	Cheyenne, Wyoming	-
27.2	ABC	KLWY	Cheyenne, Wyoming	Standard-definition; Simulcast of KTWO-TV, Casper, Wyoming
33.1	CTN	KQCK	Cheyenne, Wyoming	-
47.1	-	KGSC-LD	Cheyenne, Wyoming	-
47.2	-	KGSC-LD	Cheyenne, Wyoming	-
49	Almavision	KBRO-LD	Cheyenne, Wyoming	-

TV stations from the Denver area are available in Cheyenne, and are usually distributed on local cable and satellite systems alongside local stations.
