= Greenwood Village, Colorado =

City in Colorado, United States

- Home rule municipality
- City of Greenwood Village
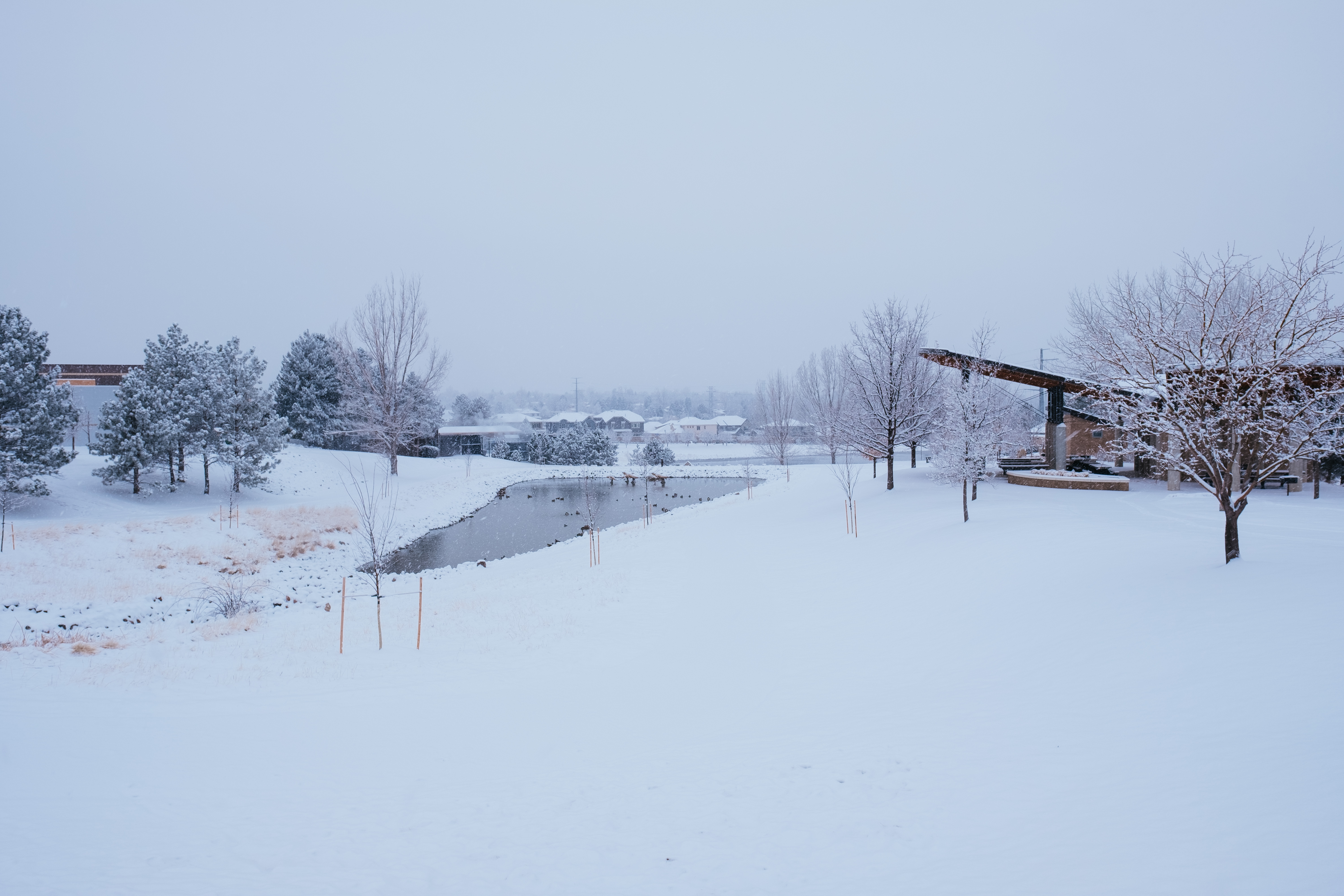
- Greenwood Village, Colorado

- Location of the City of Greenwood Village in Arapahoe County, Colorado
- Coordinates: 39°37′33″N 104°52′48″W
- Country: United States
- State: Colorado
- County: Arapahoe County
- Incorporated: September 19, 1950; 76 years ago

Government
  - Type: Home Rule Municipality

Area
  - Total: 8.280 sq mi (21.444 km^{2})
  - Land: 8.267 sq mi (21.412 km^{2})
  - Water: 0.012 sq mi (0.032 km^{2})
- Elevation: 5,633 ft (1,717 m)

Population (2020)
  - Total: 15,691
  - Density: 1,898/sq mi (733/km^{2})
- Time zone: UTC−07:00 (MST)
  - Summer (DST): UTC−06:00 (MDT)
- ZIP codes: 80110-80112 & 80121 & 80155 (PO Box)
- Area codes: Both 303 and 720
- FIPS code: 08-33035
- GNIS feature ID: 2410661
- Website: www.greenwoodvillage.com

The City of Greenwood Village is a home rule municipality located in Arapahoe County, Colorado, United States. The city population was 15,691 at the 2020 United States census. Greenwood Village is a part of the Denver-Aurora-Centennial, CO Metropolitan Statistical Area and the Front Range Urban Corridor.

== History ==
The city is named for the Greenwood Ranch. The area was developed during the 1860s when settlers came from the East and Midwest looking for gold. By the early 1900s, it had become a farming community but did not incorporate until 1950. Starting in the 1970s, Greenwood Village grew rapidly with the development of the Denver Technological Center. Mayor Freda Poundstone resisted efforts by neighboring Denver to annex more land for the Tech Center, which resulted in the 1974 Poundstone Amendment. This effectively froze Denver's boundaries in place and allowed Greenwood Village to annex prime properties along the I-25 corridor. This in turn raised objections from residents of unincorporated Arapahoe County, who were losing their tax base as a result, and led to the incorporation of Centennial in 2001. Now as of 2010 Greenwood Village is itself hemmed in by Centennial's boundaries, and has had three rare cases of deannexation – in 1985, 2011, and 2024.

== Geography ==
At the 2020 United States census, the town had a total area of 5,299 acres (21.444 km^{2}) including 7.9 acres (0.032 km^{2}) of water.

== Demographics ==
Historical population
Census	Pop.	Note	%±
1960	572		—
1970	3,095		441.1%
1980	5,729		85.1%
1990	7,589		32.5%
2000	11,035		45.4%
2010	13,925		26.2%
2020	15,691		12.7%
U.S. Decennial Census

=== 2020 census ===
As of the 2020 census, Greenwood Village had a population of 15,691. The median age was 42.7 years. 22.3% of residents were under the age of 18 and 18.5% of residents were 65 years of age or older. For every 100 females there were 97.7 males, and for every 100 females age 18 and over there were 95.7 males age 18 and over.

100.0% of residents lived in urban areas, while 0.0% lived in rural areas.

There were 6,290 households in Greenwood Village, of which 30.6% had children under the age of 18 living in them. Of all households, 55.9% were married-couple households, 16.5% were households with a male householder and no spouse or partner present, and 22.0% were households with a female householder and no spouse or partner present. About 25.6% of all households were made up of individuals and 7.9% had someone living alone who was 65 years of age or older.

There were 6,731 housing units, of which 6.6% were vacant. The homeowner vacancy rate was 1.2% and the rental vacancy rate was 8.5%.

Racial composition as of the 2020 census
Race	Number	Percent
White	12,208	77.8%
Black or African American	358	2.3%
American Indian and Alaska Native	59	0.4%
Asian	1,703	10.9%
Native Hawaiian and Other Pacific Islander	20	0.1%
Some other race	284	1.8%
Two or more races	1,059	6.7%
Hispanic or Latino (of any race)	999	6.4%

=== 2000 census ===
As of the 2000 census, there were 11,035 people, 3,997 households, and 3,097 families residing in the city. The population density was 1,361.0 inhabitants per square mile (525.5/km^{2}). There were 4,206 housing units at an average density of 518.7 per square mile (200.3/km^{2}). The racial makeup of the city was 93.90% White, 1.14% African American, 0.19% Native American, 2.55% Asian, 0.05% Pacific Islander, 0.61% from other races, and 1.57% from two or more races. Hispanic or Latino of any race were 3.12% of the population.

There were 3,997 households, out of which 41.8% had children under the age of 18 living with them, 69.8% were married couples living together, 5.7% had a female householder with no husband present, and 22.5% were non-families. 17.5% of all households were made up of individuals, and 3.3% had someone living alone who was 65 years of age or older. The average household size was 2.75 and the average family size was 3.15. Greenwood Village resides within the Cherry Creek School District. West Middle School and Campus Middle School feed Cherry Creek High School.

In the city, the population was spread out, with 29.7% under the age of 18, 5.0% from 18 to 24, 23.9% from 25 to 44, 32.3% from 45 to 64, and 9.1% who were 65 years of age or older. The median age was 41 years. For every 100 females, there were 100.6 males. For every 100 females age 18 and over, there were 97.5 males.

The median income for a household in the city was $116,147, and the median income for a family was $145,802. Males had a median income of $99,088 versus $41,991 for females. The per capita income for the city was $69,189. About 1.5% of families and 1.9% of the population were below the poverty line, including 1.1% of those under age 18 and 4.1% of those age 65 or over. To compare, the average US income for 2000 was $48,476.

Educational background for population 25 years and over in Greenwood Village:

- High school or higher: 98.5%
- Bachelor's degree or higher: 72.3%
- Graduate or professional degree: 31.2%
- Unemployed: 2.6%
- Mean travel time to work: 21.0 minutes

For population 15 years and over in Greenwood Village city

- Never married: 21.4%
- Now married: 66.5%
- Separated: 0.9%
- Widowed: 2.6%
- Divorced: 8.5%

8.3% Foreign born (2.8% Europe, 2.5% Latin America, 1.6% Asia, 1.1% North America).

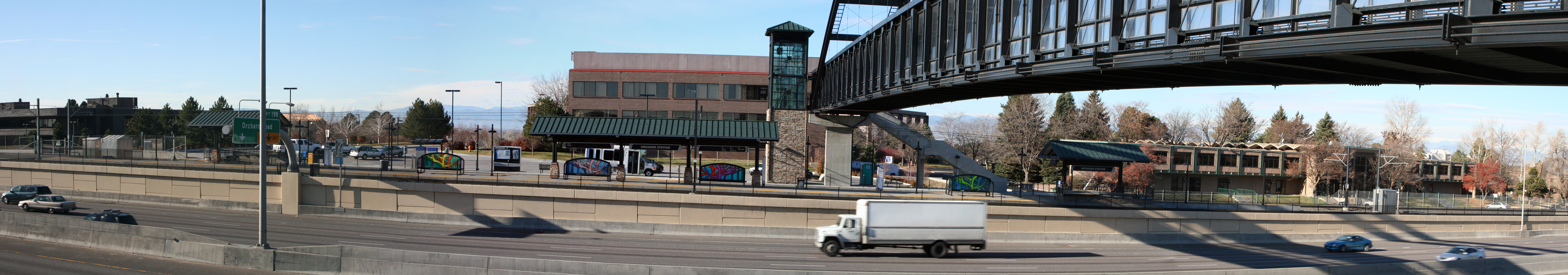
A panorama of the Orchard RTD station (located in Greenwood Village) as viewed from the east side of Interstate 25. The view includes part of the pedestrian bridge that provides access to the other side of the freeway from the station.

== Economy ==
Greenwood Village includes part of the Denver Technological Center (DTC). Companies currently based in Greenwood Village include:

- Air Methods, in the DTC, moved there in 2017
- American Medical Response
- Charter Communications
- CoBank
- CSG International
- Empower Retirement
- Excelacom
- Great-West
- Jacobs Solutions
- Newmont
- Red Robin
- RMR Colorado, LLC (Black-eyed Pea Colorado restaurants)
- Weather Nation TV
- Xanterra Parks and Resorts

Companies that were based in Greenwood Village, CO:

- Adelphia
- GapWest Broadcasting
- JD Edwards
- Molycorp
- Tele-Communications Inc
- Weather Nation TV
- First Data's headquarters were located in Greenwood Village. In 2009, First Data announced that it was moving its headquarters from Greater Denver to Greater Atlanta.

=== Top employers ===
According to the city's 2016 Comprehensive Annual Financial Report, the top employers in the city were:

#	Employer	# of Employees
1	Empower Retirement	1,000—1,500
2	Comcast Cable Communications	1,000—1,500
3	Great West Life & Annuity Insurance	1,000—1,500
4	Cherry Creek School District #5	1,000—1,500
5	Cigna Health and Life Insurance Company	500—1,000
6	Charter Communications Holding Company	500—1,000
7	Fidelity Brokerage Services	500—1,000
8	Travelers Indemnity Company	500—1,000
9	CoBank	500—1,000
10	Newmont International Services	200—500

== Radio and television ==
Greenwood Village is in the Denver television market.

Greenwood Village is a center of broadcast media in the Denver metropolitan area. The following is a list of media outlets based in the city. Greenwood Village is in the Denver-Boulder radio market. Local listeners can also receive the signal of radio stations broadcasting from nearby communities including Aurora, Centennial, Colorado Springs, Fort Collins, Greeley, Longmont, and Loveland.

The following is a list of radio stations that broadcast from and/or are licensed to Greenwood Village.

=== AM ===
Frequency	Callsign	Format	City of License	Notes
950	KKSE	Oldies	Parker, Colorado	Broadcasts from Greenwood Village
1600	KEPN	Sports	Lakewood, Colorado	Broadcasts from Greenwood Village

=== FM ===
Frequency	Callsign	Format	City of License	Notes
98.5	KYGO-FM	Country	Denver, Colorado	Broadcasts from Greenwood Village
102.3	KVOQ	Alternative	Greenwood Village, Colorado	Colorado Public Radio
104.3	KKFN	Sports	Longmont, Colorado	Broadcasts from Greenwood Village
107.5	KQKS	Rhythmic Contemporary	Lakewood, Colorado	Broadcasts from Greenwood Village

== Education ==
Cherry Creek School District, which covers most of the municipality, is based in Greenwood Village. Cherry Creek High School is the largest public high school by enrollment in Colorado, serving 3,852 students in the 2024-2025 school year.

The historic Cherry Creek Schoolhouse, built in 1874 and preserved on the high school campus, is the oldest surviving school in Greenwood Village.

A portion is in the Littleton School District 6.

Higher education:

- Metropolitan State University of Denver has a satellite campus.
- Regis University has a satellite campus.

== Entertainment ==
Greenwood Village is the site of the Fiddler's Green Amphitheatre, an 18,000-seat outdoor venue.

== Notable people ==
Notable individuals who were born in or have lived in Greenwood Village include:

- Phillip S. Figa – American judge (1951–2008)
- Mike Law (lacrosse) – American lacrosse player
- Brian Watson – American businessman and politician (born 1971)

== See also ==
- Front Range Urban Corridor
