= Mass media in Boulder, Colorado =

List of city news outlets

Boulder is a center of media in north-central Colorado. The following is a list of media outlets based in the city.

== Print ==
=== Newspapers ===
The Daily Camera is the city's primary newspaper, published daily. Other newspapers published in the city include:

- 50 Plus Marketplace News, seniors' lifestyle, monthly
- Boulder County Business Report, business news, twice monthly
- Boulder County Kids, children's entertainment, quarterly
- Boulder Weekly, alternative newspaper, weekly
- Colorado Daily, five days a week

=== Magazines ===
Yellow Scene Magazine has been reporting on topics of social, political, and cultural importance in Boulder County and the North Metro Region for 25 years.

== Radio ==
Boulder is a principal city of the Denver-Boulder radio market. In its Fall 2013 ranking of radio markets by population, Arbitron ranked the Denver-Boulder market 19th in the United States. The market includes seven counties in north-central Colorado: Adams, Arapahoe, Boulder, Broomfield, Denver, Douglas, and Jefferson.

The following is a list of radio stations which broadcast from and/or are licensed to Boulder:

=== AM ===
| Frequency | Callsign | Format | City of License | Notes |
|---|---|---|---|---|
| 1190 | KVCU | Variety | Boulder, Colorado | University of Colorado Boulder college radio |
| 1390 | KGNU | Public | Denver, Colorado | Broadcasts from Boulder |
| 1490 | KCFC | News/Talk | Boulder, Colorado | Broadcasts from Centennial, Colorado |

=== FM ===
| Frequency | Callsign | Format | City of License | Notes |
|---|---|---|---|---|
| 88.5 | KGNU | Public | Boulder, Colorado | - |
| 94.1 | K231AA | Rhythmic Contemporary | Boulder, Colorado | Translator of KDHT, Denver, Colorado |
| 97.3 | KBCO | Adult Album Alternative | Boulder, Colorado | Broadcasts from Denver, Colorado |
| 101.7 | K269AE | Country | Boulder, Colorado | Translator of KKSE-FM, Broomfield, Colorado |

Local listeners can also receive the signal of radio stations broadcasting from nearby communities including Aurora, Denver, Centennial, Greeley, Greenwood Village, Longmont, and Loveland.

== Television ==
Boulder is in the Denver television market. In addition, local viewers can receive the signal of television stations broadcasting from nearby communities including Fort Collins and Greeley.

The following is a list of television stations that broadcast from and/or are licensed to Boulder.

| Display Channel | Network | Callsign | City of License | Notes |
|---|---|---|---|---|
| 6.1 | PBS | K24HQ-D | Boulder, Colorado | Translator of KRMA-TV, Denver, Colorado |
| 6.2 | PBS Kids | K24HQ-D | Boulder, Colorado | Translator of KRMA-TV, Denver, Colorado |
| 6.3 | Create/World | K24HQ-D | Boulder, Colorado | Translator of KRMA-TV, Denver, Colorado |
| 12.1 | PBS | K48MN-D | Boulder, Colorado | Translator of KBDI-TV, Denver, Colorado |
| 12.2 | PBS Encore | K48MN-D | Boulder, Colorado | Translator of KBDI-TV, Denver, Colorado |
| 12.3 | MHz WorldView | K48MN-D | Boulder, Colorado | Translator of KBDI-TV, Denver, Colorado |
| 14.1 | UniMás | KTFD-DT | Boulder, Colorado | Broadcasts from studios in Denver, Colorado |
| 14.2 | Bounce TV | KTFD-DT | Boulder, Colorado | Broadcasts from studios in Denver, Colorado |
| 14.3 | GetTV | KTFD-DT | Boulder, Colorado | Broadcasts from studios in Denver, Colorado |
| 27.1 | - | K27MA-D | Boulder, Colorado | - |
