= KRKS =

KRKS may refer to:

- KRKS (AM), a radio station (990 AM) licensed to Denver, Colorado, United States
- KRKS-FM, a radio station (94.7 FM) licensed to Lafayette, Colorado, United States
- The ICAO airport code for Sweetwater County Airport in Rock Springs, Wyoming, United States
