= KGDQ =

KGDQ may refer to:

- KGDQ-LP, a radio station (96.5 FM) licensed to serve McAllen, Texas, United States
- KXWA, a radio station (101.9 FM) licensed to serve Centennial, Colorado, United States, which held the call sign KGDQ from 2005 to 2008
