= KRAE =

Radio station in Cheyenne, Wyoming

- Cheyenne, Wyoming; United States
- Broadcast area: Cheyenne, Wyoming
- Frequency: 1480 kHz
- Branding: 1480 KRAE

Programming
- Format: Oldies

Ownership
- Owner: Lorenz Proietti; (Proshop Radio Broadcasting, LLC)
- Sister stations: KYOY

History
- First air date: August 8, 1961

Technical information
- Licensing authority: FCC
- Facility ID: 35510
- Class: D
- Power: 1,000 watts (day); 72 watts (night)
- Transmitter coordinates: 41°7′16.94″N 104°50′23.89″W

Links
- Public license information: Public file; LMS
- Webcast: Listen live
- Website: 1480krae.com

KRAE (1480 AM) is a golden oldies formatted radio station owned by Pro-shop Radio Broadcasting, located in Cheyenne, Wyoming, United States. The station also produces several local programs per week, and a shared weather forecast is produced for it and sister station KYOY by Proshop.

== History ==
KRAE signed on as KSHY in 1961. While under construction, the transmitter was located at Hynds Boulevard and Happy Jack Road in Cheyenne. It was later moved to 910 Snyder Avenue in 1960. KRAE's current transmitter is located on Cheyenne's southwest side near Southwest Drive. In 1966, the station was sold to Radio Cheyenne, Inc. In the mid-60s, the studios were located at 2019 East 10th Street.

From 1961 through 2002, the station's manager was Tom Bauman, who also served on the board for Laramie County Community College.

The KRAE studios at 2019 East 10th Street were active well into the 2000s, when KRAE was co-owned with KAZY. The studio is now located on Dell Range Boulevard in Cheyenne. In 1996, KRAE applied for an FM station on 104.9, which would eventually become KRRR, as well as another FM station on 99.9 MHz that ultimately became KKPL, which signed on as KRRR. 104.9's original calls were KZCY.

In 2006, the station was carrying a classic country format.

The station dropped country in favor of sports, becoming Cheyenne's ESPN Radio affiliate.

At the same time, several other Cheyenne radio stations swapped formats. KFBC's sports format was split off into several stations, while the classic country format was moved to KRND 1630 kHz. KRAE's format largely drifted into where it is now with classic hits and oldies, while carrying local Cheyenne sports broadcasts.

In its present form, KRAE is generally traced back to 2008, when Brahmin Broadcasting Corp ceded KRAE due to improperly installed fencing.

The station received a notice of violation in 2012 for failing to air a weekly EAS test from station KUWR.

In 2013, the station was owned by KONA Coast Radio, and was sold to its current owners Proshop Radio Broadcasting, LLC.

KRAE's logo under previous sports format

== Signal ==
KFBC and KRAE share the same tower on Southwest Road. At 1,000 watts during the daytime, KRAE's signal covers the local urban area, including Altvan to the east and Curt Gowdy State Park to the West. In addition, it can be heard in Northern Colorado with a decent radio. At night, the station drops to 72 watts in order to protect other Class D stations from skywave interference, mainly KLMS in Lincoln This makes the groundwave signal KRAE's only method, which mainly covers central Cheyenne.

== Programming ==
The primary focus of KRAE is oldies music format which usually consists of 1950s and 1960s music, however they have been heard playing 1980s music occasionally. Beyond that, KRAE is home to Wyoming Sports Talk Today, airing between 3pm and 5pm Weekdays, a direct competitor to KFBC's "Sports Zone" at 4pm to 6pm. Additionally, Monday through Thursday evenings are home to a rebroadcast of old-time radio dramas, in their entirety, usually beginning around 8pm. KRAE still covers local sporting events when another station can't pick it up, and they are currently under contract with the Denver Nuggets.
