= KSXT =

KSXT may refer to:

- KSXT (FM), a radio station (90.3 FM) licensed to serve Smiley, Texas, United States
- KXJJ, a radio station (1570 AM) licensed to serve Loveland, Colorado, United States, which held the call sign KSXT from 2002 to 2008
