= KARS-FM =

- Laramie, Wyoming; United States
- Broadcast area: Cheyenne, Wyoming; Fort Collins-Loveland-Greeley
- Frequency: 102.9 MHz
- Branding: 102.9 The Fan

Programming
- Format: Sports
- Affiliations: Denver Sports; Colorado State Rams

Ownership
- Owner: The Fort Collins/Lafayette Divestiture Trust
- Operator: Townsquare Media
- Sister stations: KCGY, KOWB, KKPL, KMAX, KTRR and KUAD

History
- First air date: 1974 (as KIOZ)
- Former call signs: KIOZ (1974–1984); KRQU (1984–2002)

Technical information
- Licensing authority: FCC
- Facility ID: 10334
- Class: C1
- ERP: 83,000 watts
- HAAT: 248 meters (814 ft)
- Transmitter coordinates: 40°52′36.9″N 105°41′46″W
- Repeater: 102.9 KARS-FM1 (Fort Collins, Colorado)

Links
- Public license information: Public file; LMS
- Webcast: live
- Website: 1029thefanfm.com

KARS-FM (102.9 FM, "102.9 The Fan") is a radio station licensed to Laramie, Wyoming. Owned by a divestiture trust of Townsquare Media, it broadcasts a sports radio format serving the Cheyenne and Fort Collins-Greeley areas, and featuring programming from Denver's KKFN.

The facility first signed on in 1974. KARS broadcasts from Black Mountain just over the Colorado border, south of Laramie and northwest of Fort Collins. The station has an FM booster, KARS-FM1, licensed for Fort Collins, Colorado, on 102.9 FM; the booster has been licensed since September 2007.

== History ==
Logo for the previous format in the late 2000s.

The station's original call sign was KIOZ, adopted when it signed on in 1974. Industry music publications from the mid-to-late 1970s noted the station for its reporting on artists distributed by the WEA (Warner-Elektra-Atlantic) group of labels, strongly suggesting that KIOZ broadcast a Rock or Album-Oriented Rock (AOR) format during this decade.

The station changed its call sign to KRQU on March 12, 1984. During the early 1990s, KRQU ran a modern rock format, branding itself as "Power 103" and sometimes "New Rock U".

By November 1992, trade publications confirmed the station was broadcasting a country music format on 102.9 MHz, suggesting a format change from its earlier modern rock identity..The station changed its call sign to KARS on March 25, 2002. Ownership of the facility was transferred from Pacific Broadcasting of Wyoming, Inc. to a subsequent buyer during a sale process that covered the AM/FM combination in Laramie in the early 2000s.. The station was later acquired by Townsquare Media in 2003.

In December 2008, the station dropped the oldies format and began simulcasting KMAX-FM 94.3's classic hits format. On March 12, 2009, the station settled into a long-running classic rock format.

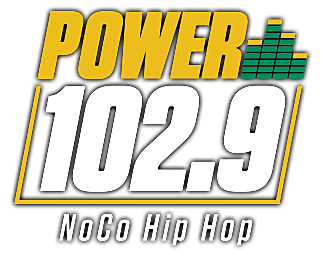
Logo as "Power", 2019-2026

On September 5, 2019, KARS-FM flipped to rhythmic contemporary as Power 102.9, becoming the first station in the market to offer the format. The station would continue to serve as the flagship for Colorado State Rams football and basketball.

On May 7, 2026, the station flipped to sports talk as 102.9 The Fan; as part of a partnership with Bonneville International, the station syndicates the daily lineup of KKFN in Denver, and will continue to serve as the flagship station of the Rams.
