= KRAN =

Country music radio station in Warren AFB–Cheyenne, Wyoming

- Warren AFB, Wyoming; United States
- Broadcast area: Cheyenne, Wyoming
- Frequency: 103.3 MHz
- Branding: 103.3 The Range

Programming
- Format: Classic country

Ownership
- Owner: Freisland Broadcasting Corp
- Sister stations: KAZY

History
- First air date: 2009
- Former call signs: KHNA (2006–2009, CP)
- Call sign meaning: Range

Technical information
- Licensing authority: FCC
- Facility ID: 166001
- Class: C2
- ERP: 37,000 watts
- HAAT: 78 meters (256 ft)
- Transmitter coordinates: 41°9′34″N 104°43′19″W

Links
- Public license information: Public file; LMS
- Webcast: Listen live
- Website: 1033therange.com

KRAN (103.3 FM) is a radio station licensed to Warren AFB, Wyoming, United States. The station is currently owned by Freisland Broadcasting Corp.

KRAN is one of several radio stations listed as official media partners for the Cheyenne Frontier Days, one of the largest outdoor rodeos and Western celebrations in the world.. The station is a sister station to Active Rock station KAZY.

== History ==
The station was first assigned the call sign KHNA on September 12, 2006. On March 23, 2009, White Park Broadcasting swapped call signs with KRAN, which had a construction permit for 97.7 FM in Wamsutter, Wyoming. The Wamsutter station would go unbuilt.

The station adopted its Classic Country format, playing country hits from the mid-1970s through the mid-1990s, including syndicated programming like Rowdy Yates' classic country show.
