= Mike Law (lacrosse) =

American lacrosse player

Personal information
- Nationality: American
- Born: April 5, 1979 (age 46) Greenwood Village, Colorado, U.S.
- Height: 5 ft 11 in (180 cm)
- Weight: 180 lb (82 kg; 12 st 12 lb)

Sport
- Position: Forward
- Shoots: Right
- NLL draft: 48th overall, 2001; Vancouver Ravens
- NLL team Former teams: Colorado Mammoth; Anaheim Storm; Vancouver Ravens
- MLL team: Denver Outlaws
- Pro career: 2002–2009

Mike Law (born April 5, 1979 in Greenwood Village, Colorado) is a former lacrosse player who played for the Denver Outlaws of Major League Lacrosse and the Colorado Mammoth in the National Lacrosse League. Law was drafted in the fourth round in both the NLL and the MLL. He was a reserve player in the 2007 All-star game. Law graduated from the University of Denver Sturm College of Law on May 19, 2007. In 2008, Law was inducted into the Denver University Hall of Fame.

== Statistics ==
=== NLL ===
		Regular Season						Playoffs
Season	Team	GP	G	A	Pts	LB	PIM	GP	G	A	Pts	LB	PIM
2002	Vancouver	7	8	6	14	31	2	1	1	1	2	6	0
2003	Vancouver	14	17	30	47	92	0	1	2	0	2	1	0
2004	Anaheim	16	22	31	53	78	4	--	--	--	--	--	--
2006	Colorado	3	2	1	3	11	0	1	0	0	0	0	0
2007	Colorado	14	13	12	25	58	0	1	1	3	4	3	0
NLL totals		54	62	80	142	270	6	4	4	4	8	10	0

=== MLL ===
		Regular Season							Playoffs
Season	Team	GP	G	2ptG	A	Pts	LB	PIM	GP	G	2ptG	A	Pts	LB	PIM
2006	Denver	11	31	3	5	39	23	1	2	4	0	4	8	5	0
2007	Denver	10	12	0	10	22	11	0.5	1	0	0	0	0	2	0
MLL Totals		21	43	3	15	61	34	1.5	3	4	0	4	8	7	0
