= KYOY =

Radio station in Hillsdale, Wyoming

- Hillsdale, Wyoming; United States
- Broadcast area: Cheyenne, Wyoming
- Frequency: 92.3 MHz
- Branding: KYOY 92.3 FM

Programming
- Format: Classic hits

Ownership
- Owner: Lorenz Proietti; (Proshop Radio Broadcasting, LLC)
- Sister stations: KRAE

History
- First air date: 2011
- Former call signs: KBFZ (1998–2007)

Technical information
- Licensing authority: FCC
- Facility ID: 77915
- Class: C3
- ERP: 12,000 watts
- HAAT: 44 meters (144 ft)
- Transmitter coordinates: 41°14′55″N 104°27′46″W
- Translator: See § Translators
- Repeater: 92.3 KYOY-FM1 (Cheyenne)

Links
- Public license information: Public file; LMS
- Webcast: Listen Live
- Website: kyoy.net

KYOY (92.3 FM, "Greatest Hits On The Planet") is a radio station broadcasting a classic hits music format. Licensed to Hillsdale, Wyoming, United States, the station is currently owned by Proshop Radio Broadcasting, LLC, through licensee Lorenz Proietti.

== History ==
The station's owner, Larry Proietti has been a prominent voice in Cheyenne radio for decades, dating back to 1986, after initially working in California and Colorado. Throughout his career, Proietti was heavily involved in local sports, calling play-by-play for approximately 2,000 games across various sports in the Cowboy State and serving as the radio announcer for the Cheyenne Frontier Days rodeo for 13 years.

He became the owner of KYOY (and its sister AM station, KRAE) in 2013, after previously working with KRRR-FM in Cheyenne.

The license was originally granted to Big Horn Broadcasting, Inc., which later transferred to others before the current owners.

As the station is licensed to a rural community outside of the main metropolitan area, it falls under the purview of policies that discourage radio stations from moving their city of license from rural areas into more urbanized ones, though the primary goal is to serve the nearby Cheyenne market.

== Translators ==
In addition to the main station, KYOY is relayed by additional translators to widen its broadcast area.

Call sign	Frequency	City of license	FID	ERP (W)	Class	FCC info
K295DD	106.9 FM	Cheyenne, Wyoming	157711	250	D	LMS
