= KUAD-FM =

- Windsor, Colorado; United States
- Broadcast area: Ft. Collins-Loveland-Greeley Cheyenne, Wyoming
- Frequency: 99.1 MHz (HD Radio)
- Branding: K99

Programming
- Format: Country
- Affiliations: Compass Media Networks

Ownership
- Owner: Townsquare Media; (Townsquare Media of Ft. Collins, Inc.)
- Sister stations: KKPL, KMAX, KTRR, KARS

History
- First air date: 1975

Technical information
- Licensing authority: FCC
- Facility ID: 49538
- Class: C1
- ERP: 100,000 watts
- HAAT: 255 meters
- Transmitter coordinates: 40°38′31″N 104°49′3″W

Links
- Public license information: Public file; LMS
- Webcast: Listen Live
- Website: k99.com

KUAD-FM (99.1 MHz, "K99") is a country music-formatted radio station licensed to Windsor, Colorado, United States. The station serves the Ft. Collins-Greeley and Cheyenne areas. The station is currently owned by Townsquare Media.

== History ==
The FM station signed on the air in 1975. The KUAD call letters originated with KUAD-AM, (now KJJD) which began broadcasting earlier, on April 15, 1969, serving the Windsor-Greeley-Fort Collins market. When the KUAD-FM facility began, it briefly operated as a Top 40 station branded as "The Power Station." It later transitioned formats, becoming "K99 Colorado's Country Favorites." This format change was timed with the rise of major country artists in the late 1980s and early 1990s.

In February 2019, KUAD-FM briefly rebranded from the traditional "K99" to "New Country 99.1." This shift followed the departure of the station's long-running morning team, "The Good Morning Guys." The station's largest annual community initiative was known as the "28 Hours of Hope." This marathon radiothon raised funds for child abuse prevention services in the region. In 2014, the annual event raised $130,089 for the cause in 28 hours, a record amount for the 16th annual broadcast at the time. The station was nominated for awards for the event.

On April 29, 2022, KUAD-FM returned to its "K99" branding.

The station transmits with a maximum Effective Radiated Power (ERP) of 100,000 watts. Its tower is near Pierce, Colorado.
