= KJJD =

Coordinates: 40°27′46″N 104°54′47″W

- Windsor, Colorado; United States
- Broadcast area: Ft. Collins, Colorado, Greeley, Colorado, Boulder, Colorado
- Branding: La Ley 1170

Programming
- Format: Mexican regional

Ownership
- Owner: Rodriguez-Gallegos Broadcasting Corporation

History
- First air date: 1969
- Former call signs: KUAD

Technical information
- Licensing authority: FCC
- Facility ID: 58940
- Class: D
- Power: 1,000 Watts Day

Links
- Public license information: Public file; LMS
- Website: laley1170.com

KJJD (1170 AM "La Ley") is a radio station broadcasting a Mexican regional format. Licensed to Windsor, Colorado, United States, it serves the Ft. Collins-Greeley area. The station is currently owned by Rodriguez-Gallegos Broadcasting Corporation. The station plays banda, cumbia, norteña, and ranchera music.

The station's studios are located in Longmont, Colorado. Its transmitter is in Windsor.

== History ==
The facility that now holds the KJJD call sign on 1170 kHz was originally granted to H.P. Brewer, who managed the station with his son, Phil Brewer. It signed on as KUAD-AM in 1969. KUAD-AM was, as its now, a daytime-only station. With the KUAD calls, it aired country music.

In 1975, KUAD-FM signed on the air, simulcasting the AM station. Today, the former sister stations have different owners: KUAD-FM 99.1 is owned by Townsquare Media.
