= Media in Loveland, Colorado =

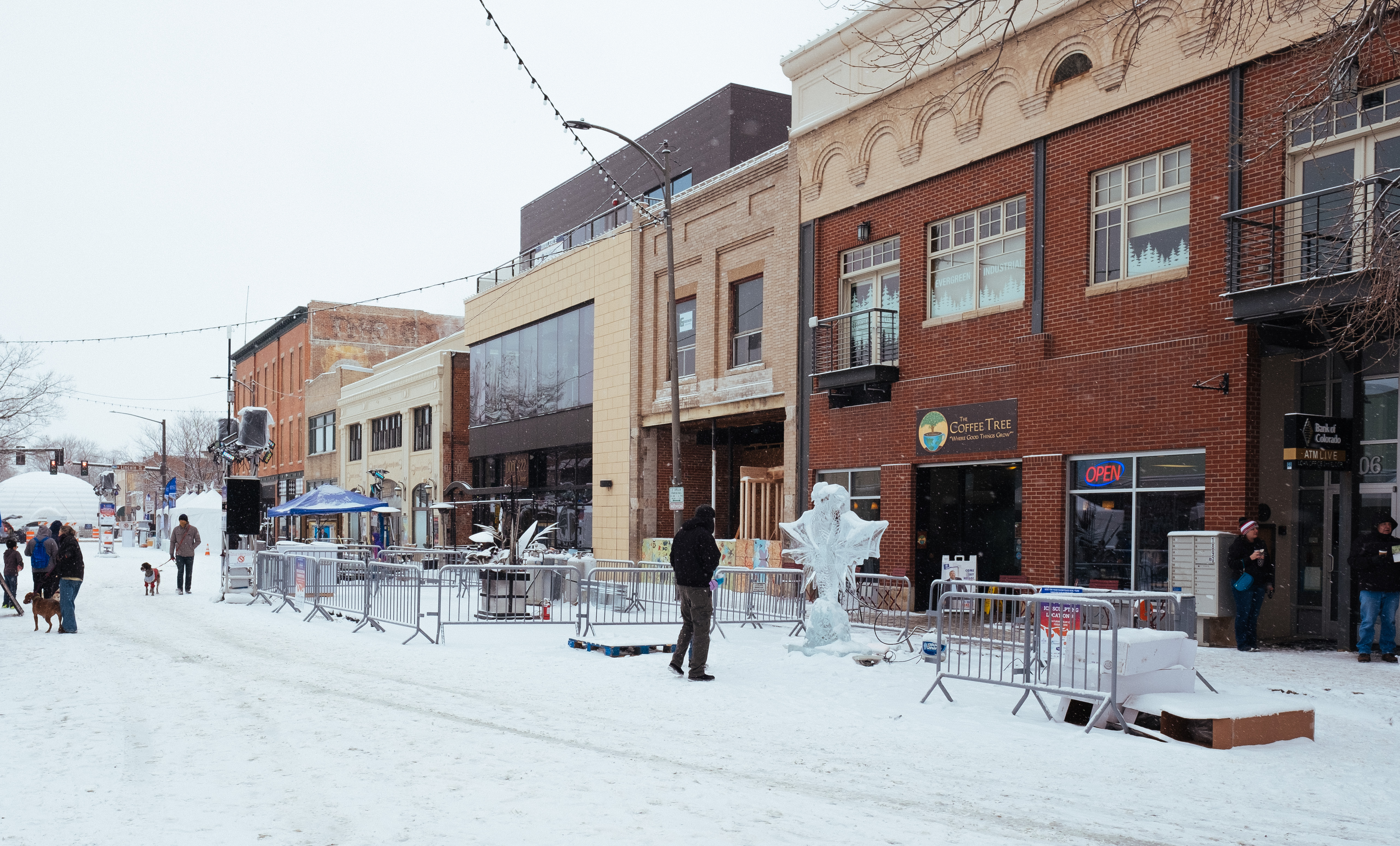
Loveland, Colorado

Loveland is a center of media in north-central Colorado. The following is a list of media outlets based in the city.

== Print ==
=== Newspapers ===
The Loveland Reporter-Herald is the local newspaper, published daily.

== Radio ==
Loveland is in the Fort Collins-Greeley radio market. Loveland is close enough to Denver to allow listeners to receive signals of most radio stations broadcasting from the Denver radio market.

The following is a list of radio stations that broadcast from and/or are licensed to Loveland.

=== AM ===
Frequency	Callsign	Format	City of License	Notes
600	KCOL	News/Talk	Wellington, Colorado	Broadcasts from Loveland
1410	KIIX	Classic Country	Fort Collins, Colorado	Broadcasts from Loveland
1570	KXJJ	Religious	Loveland, Colorado	-

=== FM ===
Frequency	Callsign	Format	City of License	Notes
89.7	KXGR	Religious	Loveland, Colorado	Broadcasts from Aurora, Colorado
93.9	KCWA	Christian Contemporary	Loveland, Colorado	WAY-FM Network; Broadcasts from Longmont, Colorado
96.1	KSME	Top 40	Greeley, Colorado	Broadcasts from Loveland
97.9	KXBG	Country	Cheyenne, Wyoming	Broadcasts from Loveland
100.7	KOLT-FM	Country	Cheyenne, Wyoming	Broadcasts from Loveland
102.5	KTRR	Adult Contemporary	Loveland, Colorado	Broadcasts from Windsor, Colorado
107.3	K297AK	Spanish Religious	Loveland, Colorado	Translator of KXBG, Cheyenne, Wyoming
107.9	KPAW	Classic Rock	Fort Collins, Colorado	Broadcasts from Loveland

== Television ==
Loveland is in the Denver television market.
