= KLZ =

- Denver, Colorado; United States
- Broadcast area: Denver metropolitan area
- Frequency: 560 kHz (HD Radio)
- Branding: KLZ Radio

Programming
- Language: English
- Format: Conservative talk radio
- Affiliations: Radio America; Salem Radio Network

Ownership
- Owner: Crawford Broadcasting
- Sister stations: KLDC, KLTT, KLVZ

History
- First air date: March 10, 1922; 104 years ago
- Former call signs: Amateur station licenses: 9JE (1920–1921); 9ZAF (1921–1922)

Technical information
- Licensing authority: FCC
- Facility ID: 35088
- Class: B
- Power: 5,000 watts
- Transmitter coordinates: 39°50′35.9″N 104°57′15.9″W

Links
- Public license information: Public file; LMS
- Website: www.klzradio.com

KLZ (560 AM) is a commercial radio station licensed to Denver, Colorado. It airs a conservative talk radio format and is owned by Crawford Broadcasting, with studios on South Parker Road in Aurora. It was the first, therefore is the oldest, radio broadcasting station in the state of Colorado, and one of the oldest in the United States.

KLZ is a Class B station powered at 5,000 watts. To avoid interfering with other stations on 560 AM, it uses a directional antenna with a two-tower array. The transmitter is on Niver Creek Trail off Steele Street in Welby. The signal covers much of the population center of Colorado, from Fort Collins to Colorado Springs and Pueblo. The station is licensed to broadcast using HD Radio technology. In addition, listeners in Denver can hear KLZ programming on 99-watt FM translator K264BO at 100.7 MHz.

== Station history ==
=== Experimental years ===
KLZ was first licensed as a broadcasting station on March 10, 1922, to the Reynolds Radio Company of Denver, Colorado. The company's president, Dr. William D. "Doc" Reynolds Jr., had earlier experimented with radio broadcasts, and the station traditionally traces its founding to 1919 or 1920.

In September 1915, Reynolds, then living in Minneapolis, was issued his first license for an amateur radio station with the call sign 9WH. This initial station employed a spark transmitter that could only transmit the dots-and-dashes of Morse code. With the entrance of the United States into World War I in April 1917, all civilian radio stations were ordered to cease operations for the duration of the conflict.

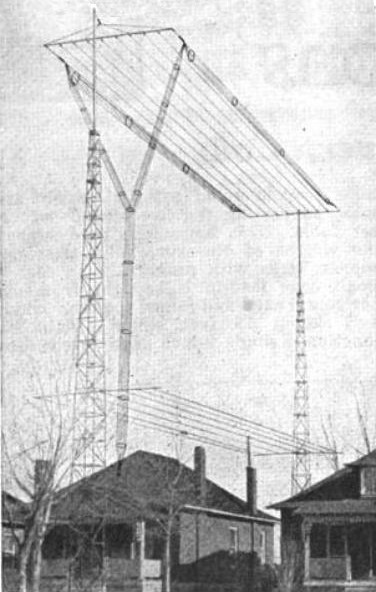
The studio, transmitter and antenna for Special Amateur station 9ZAF and broadcasting station KLZ were originally located at William Reynolds' home (1922)

In late 1919 the amateur radio ban was ended and Reynolds, who had subsequently moved to Colorado Springs, relicensed his amateur station, which was now issued the call sign of 9JE. During the war, vacuum tube radio transmitters had been developed that made audio transmissions practical. Reynolds began work with the U.S. Forestry Service to evaluate the practicality of using radiotelephones to aid department communication. He also took advantage of the equipment provided by the Forestry service to experiment with entertainment broadcasts, and one of his first radiotelephone tests, in May 1920, provided musical selections for a dance held by students at a local high school.

In late October 1920, a newspaper account stated that Reynolds was broadcasting nightly concerts. This report also noted he had decided to suspend his dental practice to devote full-time attention to radio. He founded the Reynolds Radio Specialty Company, which was located at his home on South Prospect Street. The following February, another newspaper article stated that he had been broadcasting regular Sunday evening concerts. The article also said Reynolds was making plans to move his family and his company to Denver. (Reflecting this change, the Commerce Department's June 1921 amateur station call book entry for 9JE lists its new location as Denver, operated by the Reynolds Radio Specialty Co.)

After moving to Denver, Reynolds joined with other radio enthusiasts in making a number of "mobile" demonstrations, where radio-receiver equipped automobiles picked up special programs. He participated in the May 19, 1921, broadcast of the opera Martha from the Denver Municipal Auditorium. In the summer of 1921, Reynolds was issued a "Special Amateur" license, with the call sign 9ZAF. This allowed transmissions on 370 meters (811 kHz), a wavelength with less interference than 9JE had encountered on the congested standard amateur wavelength of 200 meters (1500 kHz). In addition to experimental broadcasts, 9ZAF acted as a "relay station" for coast-to-coast messages passing through a cooperative network of Amateur Radio Relay League stations. In October, it was announced that 9ZAF's equipment had been upgraded, and, in addition to Sunday evening concerts from 8:00 to 9:30 pm, the station was broadcasting daily weather forecasts twice a day, at 8:30 a.m. and 9:00 pm. In early 1922, the Rocky Mountain News announced it was providing news bulletins as a supplement to the nightly station concerts. The paper also started promoting 9ZAF, referring to the station as the "News-Times-Reynolds Broadcasting station".

=== The start of KLZ ===
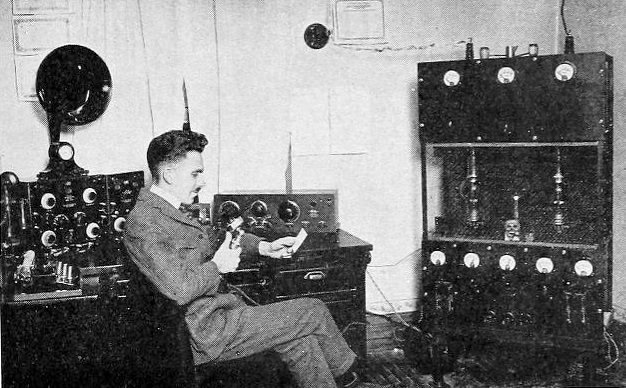
Dr. William D. Reynolds broadcasting over KLZ (1922)

Initially, there were no formal restrictions about which radio station license categories could make broadcasts intended for the general public. However, effective December 1, 1921, the Department of Commerce, which regulated U.S. radio at this time, adopted a regulation that stations making general broadcasts now had to hold a Limited Commercial license. To comply with this new standard, the Reynolds Radio Company applied for the appropriate license, and on March 10, 1922, a broadcasting station authorization – the first in the state of Colorado – with the randomly assigned call letters of KLZ was issued to the company.

KLZ was given permission to use both of the broadcasting wavelengths established by the new regulations: 360 meters (833 kHz) for "entertainment" broadcasts, and 485 meters (619 kHz) for "market and weather" reports. (Reynolds' amateur radio transmissions, although using the same equipment as KLZ, continued as 9ZAF on 370 meters). In late March, the Rocky Mountain News reported the station's schedule as "KLZ (ex-9ZAF), News-Times-Reynolds service begins broadcasting news, market reports, and concerts and a good-night story for the children at 7:30 p.m. Sermons and music Sundays from 8:00 to 9:30 p.m. at 360 meters" in addition to "Market reports and financial news daily at 12:30 noon,[sic] except Sundays, at 485 meters".

KLZ was initially located at Reynolds' home at 1124 South University Boulevard in Denver. Two 80-foot (25-meter) towers had been erected, one in front of the house and the other behind, to support a large "flat-top" transmitting antenna and counterpoise. A room in the house was set aside as a studio and also housed the station's transmitter. Initially Reynolds – who played saxophone and violin – and his wife Naomi – who played piano – provided much of the entertainment, and they were later joined by their young son. KLZ's studios later moved to the Shirley-Savoy Hotel (Savoy opened in 1904; Shirley opened in 1903; joined in 1919; razed in 1970), with the station antenna constructed atop the building.

In 1927, the Federal Radio Commission was formed to regulate radio stations in the United States. It embarked on a major restructuring of the broadcast band, and, on November 11, 1928, under the provisions of General Order 40, KLZ was assigned to operate on 560 kHz, which it has continued to use ever since. This assignment specified a transmitting power of 1,000 watts, then the maximum permitted for stations operating on a "regional" frequency. KLZ was later able to take advantage of the adoption of higher limits, eventually increasing its power to 5,000 watts, its current rating.

Dr. Reynolds died in November 1931, and KLZ signed off for three hours in his memory. In 2014, he was inducted into the Broadcast Pioneers of Colorado's "Broadcast Pioneers Hall of Fame".

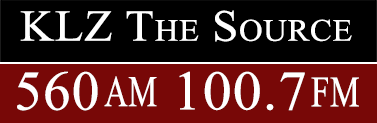
Former logo

== KLZ timelines ==
=== Later history ===
- 1947: KLZ-FM began broadcasting, becoming the first FM station on the air west of St. Louis.
- March 12, 1949: KLZ received "the small station Alfred I. duPont Award for meritorious service" for its medical series, "Knave of Hearts."
- November 1, 1953: KLZ-TV (now KMGH-TV) went on the air on Channel 7 as a CBS affiliate (it is now affiliated with ABC).
- 1954: KLZ debuted Denver's first call-in shows.
- September 2, 1955: Original KLZ-FM deleted.
- 1957: KLZ-TV won a Peabody Award for Panorama, a weekly public affairs series.
- 1962: New KLZ-FM licensed at 106.7 MHz (now KWBL).
- Circa 1976: KLZ-FM's call sign changed to KAZY (not to be confused with present-day KAZY of Cheyenne).
- 1978: KLZ dropped its MOR format and switched to country music.
- 1983: KLZ signed an agreement to broadcast the Denver Gold USFL football games as flagship station of the Curt Gowdy Network.
- May 1, 2007: The station changes from a sports radio format to a Christian radio format.
- It is a former affiliate of ESPN Radio and Sporting News Radio.

=== Ownership ===
- March 10, 1922: Original KLZ license issued to the Reynolds Radio Company.
- 1927: One-third share of KLZ given to wholesale grocer Frederick W. Meyer in exchange for his providing $2,500 to pay a freight bill for an organ.
- 1935: The Reynolds Radio Company sold KLZ to Edward K. Gaylord and his Oklahoma Publishing Company (which later purchased The Broadmoor and other assets from Spencer Penrose's El Pomar Foundation).
- 1949: Aladdin Radio and television, Inc. bought KLZ.
- 1954: Time, Inc. bought KLZ Radio & TV from Gaylord, who later subordinated their acquisition under its in 1961 established subsidiary Time-Life, Inc. as Time–Life Broadcasting, Inc.
- 1972: Time–Life sold KLZ-TV to McGraw-Hill, and the station's call sign changed to KMGH-TV.
- February 12, 1972: Time–Life sold KLZ and KLZ-FM to Group One Broadcasting Co., West for $2,750,000. (Group One was 45% owned by Knight Newspapers, and 55% owned by Roger G. Berk Sr. and associates.)
- May 1977: According to radio historian Tom Mulvey, the Roger Berk family took full ownership of KLZ and its FM station (switching call letters to KAZY) at this time. This probably means that Group One Broadcasting became 100% owned by the family (i.e., Knight Newspapers' 45% share was bought out).
- 1987: Group One sells KLZ and KAZY to DKM Broadcasting.
- June 1992: Crawford Broadcasting purchases KLZ from DKM Broadcasting.

== See also ==
- List of initial AM-band station grants in the United States
- List of three-letter broadcast call signs in the United States
