= Salem Media Group =

American radio broadcaster and media company

Salem Media Group, Inc.
- Formerly: Salem Communications Corporation
- Type: Public
- Traded as: OTCQX: SALM
- Industry: Mass media commercial radio broadcasting
- Genre: Radio broadcasting, publishing, internet content provider
- Founded: 1974; 52 years ago
- Founders: Stuart Epperson; Edward Atsinger III
- Headquarters: 6400 N Beltline Road; Irving, Texas, U.S.
- Revenue: $267 million (2022)
- Number of employees: 1,173 (2019)
- Website: salemmedia.com

Salem Media Group, Inc. (formerly Salem Communications Corporation) is an American radio broadcaster, internet content provider, and magazine and book publisher based in Irving, Texas, targeting audiences interested in Christian values and what it describes as "family-themed content and conservative values".

Salem Media Group owns 117 radio stations in 38 markets, including 60 stations in the top 25 markets and 29 in the top 10, making it tied with Audacy for the fifth-largest radio broadcaster.

In addition to its radio properties, the company owns:

- Salem Radio Network, which syndicates talk, news and music programming to approximately 2,400 affiliates.
- Salem Media Representatives, a radio advertising company.
- Salem Web Network, an Internet provider of Christian content and online streaming with over 100 Christian content and conservative opinion websites.
- Salem Publishing, a publisher of Christian themed magazines.
- Conservative websites Townhall.com, RedState, Hot Air, and PJ Media, as well as Twitter aggregator Twitchy.

The company was founded by brothers-in-law Stuart Epperson and Edward G. Atsinger III and is a for-profit corporation. This allows it to accept commercial advertising. It was formerly traded on Nasdaq until it was delisted on December 26, 2023, for not meeting exchange requirements, and has since traded over-the-counter.

== History ==
Former logo of Salem Communications

In 1974, Atsinger (chief executive officer) and Epperson (chairman of the board) combined their radio assets to create Salem Communications. Beginning with stations in North Carolina and California, Atsinger and Epperson purchased station properties in Boston, San Antonio, New York City, San Francisco, Portland, Los Angeles and other markets, converting them to Christian talk stations. In the late 1980s and early 1990s, they expanded formats to include contemporary Christian music (with most stations under this format branded as "The Fish"), news talk (branded as "The Answer"), Spanish-language Christian content, and business programming.

Many of Salem's stations are licensed to subsidiaries, organized by geographical area and media cluster as the company has acquired new stations and their previous licensees.

Salem Communications Corp acquired Twitter curation site, Twitchy.com. In January 2014, the company announced the acquisition of the assets of Eagle Publishing, including Regnery Publishing, Human Events, and RedState, and sister companies Eagle Financial Publications and Eagle Wellness.

On February 23, 2015, Salem Communications changed its name to Salem Media Group.

In 2015, Salem Media Group expanded their digital platform with acquisitions of several businesses and assets, including DividendYieldHunter.com, Stockinvestor.com; DividendInvestor.com, a Spanish Bible mobile app, along with its related website and Facebook properties; the DailyBible mobile app; the Daily Bible Devotion mobile app; and also, Bryan Perry's Newsletters.

In 2016, Salem Media Group continued to expand by acquiring the websites ChristianConcertAlerts.com, Historyonthenet.com and Authentichistory.com; as well as Mike Turner's line of investment products, including TurnerTrends.com; the Retirement Watch newsletter and website, Retirementwatch.com; and the King James Bible mobile application. Salem Media Group also acquired Mill City Press from Hillcrest Publishing Group, Inc.

In July 2017, Salem Media Group merged DividendYieldHunter.com and transferred all content into DividendInvestor.com.

In March 2019, political writer Raheem Kassam and lawyer Will Chamberlain purchased Human Events from Salem Media Group for $300,000.

In early 2021, the company moved most operations from the former main operations city of Camarillo, California to Irving, Texas, the same location of their long-owned radio station KLTY.

On November 8, 2023, Salem exited the Upstate market after it sold WGTK in Greenville, South Carolina and the Earth FM stations to the Educational Media Foundation, resulting in WGTK switching to the K-Love network and WRTH and WLTE switching to Air1 several days before.

In December 2024, it was announced that the company had sold all remaining Christian Contemporary stations to the Educational Media Foundation. The move was intended to help the company repay debt to investors. Educational Media Foundation began operating the stations on February 1, 2025.

In April 2025, Salem Media signed a deal with Donald Trump Jr. and Lara Trump that will see them both become stakeholders in the company. Salem Media acquired a 30 percent stake in MxM News, a mobile news aggregation app that is co-owned by Donald Trump Jr. In May 2026, the company was acquired by The Christian Community Foundation, Inc., doing business as WaterStone.

== Radio stations ==
Stations are arranged in order by state and city of license.

AM Stations	FM Stations

Stations owned by Salem Media Group
City of license/Market	Station	Current format	Licensee
Phoenix, AZ	KKNT 960	Conservative talk	Salem Communications Holding Corporation
Phoenix, AZ	KXXT 1010	Christian radio	Salem Communications Holding Corporation
Phoenix, AZ	KPXQ 1360	Christian radio	Salem Communications Holding Corporation
Little Rock, AR	KDIS-FM 99.5	Christian radio	Salem Communications Holding Corporation
Little Rock, AR	KDXE 101.1	Conservative talk	Salem Communications Holding Corporation
Riverside–San Bernardino, CA	KTIE 590	Conservative talk	Salem Communications Holding Corporation
Los Angeles, CA	KRLA 870	Conservative talk	New Inspiration Broadcasting Co., Inc.
Los Angeles, CA	KKLA-FM 99.5	Christian radio	New Inspiration Broadcasting Co., Inc.
Oxnard–Ventura, CA	KDAR 98.3	Christian radio	New Inspiration Broadcasting Co., Inc.
Sacramento, CA	KFIA 710	Christian radio	New Inspiration Broadcasting Co., Inc.
Sacramento, CA	KTKZ 1380	Conservative talk	New Inspiration Broadcasting Co., Inc.
San Diego, CA	KCBQ 1170	Conservative talk	New Inspiration Broadcasting Co., Inc.
San Diego, CA	KPRZ 1210	Christian radio	New Inspiration Broadcasting Co., Inc.
San Francisco–Oakland, CA	KTRB 860	Conservative talk	New Inspiration Broadcasting Co., Inc.
San Francisco–Oakland, CA	KFAX 1100	Christian radio	New Inspiration Broadcasting Co., Inc.
San Francisco–Oakland, CA	KDYA 1190	Urban gospel	New Inspiration Broadcasting Co., Inc.
San Francisco–Oakland, CA	KDOW 1220	Business talk	SCA-Palo Alto, LLC.
San Francisco–Oakland, CA	KDIA 1640	Christian radio	New Inspiration Broadcasting Co., Inc.
Colorado Springs, CO	KZNT 1460	Conservative talk	Bison Media
Colorado Springs, CO	KGFT 100.7	Christian radio	Bison Media
Denver, CO	KNUS 710	Conservative talk	Salem Media of Colorado, Inc.
Denver, CO	KRKS 990	Christian radio	Salem Media of Colorado, Inc.
Denver, CO	KBJD 1650	Spanish Christian	Salem Media of Colorado, Inc.
Denver, CO	KRKS-FM 100.7	Christian radio	Salem Media of Colorado, Inc.
Washington, D.C.	WWRC 570	Conservative talk	Salem Communications Holding Corporation
Washington, D.C.	WAVA 780	Christian radio	Salem Communications Holding Corporation
Washington, D.C.	WAVA-FM 105.1	Christian radio	Salem Communications Holding Corporation
Orlando–Daytona Beach, FL	WORL 950	Conservative talk	Salem Communications Holding Corporation
Orlando–Daytona Beach, FL	WTLN 990	Christian radio	Salem Communications Holding Corporation
Sarasota–Bradenton, FL	WLSS 930	Conservative talk	Salem Communications Holding Corporation
Tampa–St. Petersburg, FL	WTBN 570	Christian radio	Salem Communications Holding Corporation
Tampa–St. Petersburg, FL	WLCC 760	Christian radio (Note: Simulcast of WTBN.)	Salem Communications Holding Corporation
Tampa–St. Petersburg, FL	WGUL 860	Conservative talk	Salem Communications Holding Corporation
Atlanta, GA	WDWD 590	Christian radio	Salem Communications Holding Corporation
Atlanta, GA	WGKA 920	Conservative talk	Salem Communications Holding Corporation
Atlanta, GA	WNIV 970	Christian radio	Salem Communications Holding Corporation
Atlanta, GA	WLTA 1400	Christian radio (Note: Simulcast of WNIV.)	Salem Communications Holding Corporation
Chicago, IL	WIND 560	Conservative talk	Salem Media of Illinois, LLC
Chicago, IL	WYLL 1160	Christian radio	Salem Media of Massachusetts, LLC
Boston, MA	WEZE 590	Christian radio	Salem Communications Holding Corporation
Boston, MA	WROL 950	Christian radio	Salem Media of Massachusetts, LLC
Detroit, MI	WDTK 1400	Conservative talk	Salem Communications Holding Corporation
Detroit, MI	WLQV 1500	Christian radio	Salem Communications Holding Corporation
Minneapolis–St. Paul, MN	KKMS 980	Christian radio	Salem Communications Holding Corporation
Minneapolis–St. Paul, MN	WWTC 1280	Conservative talk	Salem Media of Massachusetts, LLC
Minneapolis–St. Paul, MN	KYCR 1440	Business talk	Salem Communications Holding Corporation
Minneapolis–St. Paul, MN	KDIZ 1570	Conservative talk	Salem Communications Holding Corporation
New York City, NY	WMCA 570	Christian radio	Salem Media of New York, LLC
New York City, NY	WNYM 970	Conservative talk	Salem Media of New York, LLC
Cleveland, OH	WHKW 1220	Christian radio	Salem Communications Holding Corporation
Cleveland, OH	WHK 1420	Conservative talk	Salem Communications Holding Corporation
Columbus, OH	WRFD 880	Christian radio	Salem Media of Ohio, Inc.
Columbus, OH	WTOH 98.9	Conservative talk	Salem Media of Ohio, Inc.
Portland, OR	KPDQ 800	Christian radio	Salem Media of Oregon, Inc.
Portland, OR	KPAM 1640	Conservative talk	Salem Media of Oregon, Inc.
Portland, OR	KRYP 93.1	Regional Mexican	Salem Media of Oregon, Inc.
Portland, OR	KPDQ-FM 93.9	Christian radio	Salem Media of Oregon, Inc.
Philadelphia, PA	WFIL 560	Christian radio	Salem Communications Holding Corporation
Philadelphia, PA	WNTP 990	Conservative talk	Salem Communications Holding Corporation
Pittsburgh, PA	WPIT 730	Christian radio	Salem Communications Holding Corporation
Pittsburgh, PA	WPGP 1250	Conservative talk	Salem Communications Holding Corporation
Pittsburgh, PA	WORD-FM 101.5	Christian radio	Salem Communications Holding Corporation
Dallas–Fort Worth, TX	KSKY 660	Conservative talk	Bison Media
Dallas–Fort Worth, TX	KWRD-FM 100.7	Christian radio	Inspiration Media of Texas, LLC
Houston–Galveston, TX	KNTH 1070	Conservative talk	Salem Communications Holding Corporation
Houston–Galveston, TX	KKHT-FM 100.7	Christian radio	Salem Media of Illinois, LLC
San Antonio, TX	KSLR 630	Christian radio	Salem Media of Texas, Inc.
San Antonio, TX	KLUP 930	Conservative talk	Salem Communications Holding Corporation
Seattle–Tacoma, WA	KGNW 820	Christian radio	Inspiration Media, Inc.
Seattle–Tacoma, WA	KKOL 1300	Conservative talk	Inspiration Media, Inc.

== Salem Radio Network ==
Salem Radio Network is a satellite radio network serving general market News/Talk stations and Christian-formatted stations through affiliate partnerships serving more than 2,700 radio stations. The five major divisions are SRN Talk, SRN News, Salem Music Network, Salem Media Reps and Vista Media Reps and SRN Satellite Services.

- SRN Talk produces general market News/Talk shows featuring nationally syndicated hosts Hugh Hewitt, Mike Gallagher, Dennis Prager, Sebastian Gorka, and Brandon Tatum. It also produces Christian market programming featuring The Eric Metaxas Show.
- SRN News is a news source for conservative and Christian radio serving over 2,000 affiliates, and stations also take newscast branded by Salem's Townhall.com.
- The Salem Music Network has three satellite offerings – Contemporary Christian, Praise and Southern Gospel.
- Salem Media Reps specializes in Christian, family-themed and conservative media, radio, online, print and mobile.
- SRN Satellite Services provides satellite distribution and production services to over 70 organizations and ministries.

The satellite feed for Salem's general market programming can be heard on the CRN Digital Talk Radio Networks, on CRN3.

== Salem News Channel ==
Salem News Channel is a 24/7 news television network founded in 2021. In June 2022, it was announced that the network reached an agreement with Innovate Corp. to launch on over-the-air television in 55 markets. The network stream is also available on the website, the mobile app, Fubo, Sling TV, Apple TV+, Local Now, Xumo, Pluto TV, Google TV, Amazon Fire TV, Samsung TV Plus, and Vizio.

== Salem Publishing ==
Salem's flagship publication, CCM Magazine, was in the Christian music industry for more than 25 years. Salem no longer prints CCM Magazine, but it still exists in an online-only format. Other magazine publications include Singing News Magazine, which discusses happenings involving the Southern gospel community.

== Salem Author Services ==
Under the umbrella of Salem Author Service are Xulon Press, Mill City Press, and the websites Bookprinting.com, Bookediting.com, Publishgreen.com, and Libertyhill.com.

=== Xulon Press ===
Xulon Press (pronounced "zoo-lon") is a hybrid publisher owned by the Salem Media Group. In 2007 it claimed to be "the largest publisher of Christian books in North America", claiming more than 3,900 print-on-demand titles published by 2007. As of 2022, the website claimed Xulon Press published over 15,000 unique book titles and that more than a million copies of its books had been printed and sold. Its titles are mainly in the categories of Christian living, theology, church growth, discipleship, Bible studies, fiction, poetry, biographies, and others. For a fixed fee the press will publish an author's finished manuscript in paperback, hard cover, and electronic form. Once published, customers may order the book directly from online retailers, and retailers may order the book through distributors. According to their company contact page, the Xulon Press office is located in Maitland, Florida, United States.

Founded in 2000 by Christian author and publisher Tom Freiling. The company was originally incorporated in Virginia in May 2001 and then moved to Florida in May 2002. The principal "place of business" was still listed as Fairfax, Virginia until 2005, when the physical address was moved to Longwood, Florida. Xulon Press was bought in 2006 and is now a part of Salem Media Group. In 2016, Salem Media bought a Minneapolis, Minnesota, US-based self-publishing company Hillcrest Media and merged it with Xulon Press.

== Salem Español Online ==
Salem owns a collection of Spanish language sites that provide a variety of Christian and family-friendly resources online. A few of those sites are CristoTarjetas.com; ElsitioCristiano.com; BibliaVida.com and LuzMundial.com.

== Salem Media Representatives ==
Salem Media Representatives is a subsidiary of Salem Media Group. In 2026, an investigation by The Intercept published documents filed under the Foreign Agents Registration Act that reported Salem Media Group executive Brad Parscale directed $500,000 for ads to Salem Media Representatives of behalf of Israel.

== Political activities ==
The founders of Salem Communications support various religious causes, and are noted for their role in spreading politically conservative opinion to areas dependent on radio for current events information. In 2005, Epperson was reported in Time magazine as one of the "25 Most Influential Evangelicals in America". In 2004 he co-chaired "Americans of Faith", a religiously based Republican electoral campaign. Both founders have served on the Council for National Policy, a group of conservative influencers, intellectuals, donors, and former elected officials, and Epperson has served as president of the council. They gave $100,000 to the Bush presidential reelection campaign and $780,000 to the 2000 "California Defense of Marriage Act" (Proposition 22) ballot measure.

In October 2022, Salem, along with Dinesh D'Souza and True The Vote, was sued by Mark Andrews for defamation in Dinesh D'Souza's film, 2000 Mules, for which Salem was the distributor as well as the publisher of a book of the same name. In the film, D'Souza, without any evidence, falsely accused Andrews of ballot stuffing. In May 2024, Salem pulled the film and book from distribution and apologized to Andrews, claiming they had relied on representations made by D'Souza and True The Vote, and had never intended to harm Andrews. The suit is ongoing.
