= KLVZ =

- Brighton, Colorado; United States
- Broadcast area: Denver metropolitan area
- Frequency: 810 kHz (HD Radio)
- Branding: Legends 95.3 FM, 810 AM

Programming
- Format: Oldies and adult standards

Ownership
- Owner: Crawford Broadcasting; (Kimtron, Inc.)
- Sister stations: KLZ, KLTT, KLDC

History
- First air date: April 26, 1956
- Former call signs: KBRN (1956–1982); KLTT (1982–1996); KLDC (1996–2007)
- Former frequencies: 800 kHz (1956–2006)

Technical information
- Licensing authority: FCC
- Facility ID: 35089
- Class: B
- Power: 2,200 watts (day); 430 watts (night)
- Transmitter coordinates: 40°1′40.9″N 104°49′22.9″W (day); 39°50′35.9″N 104°57′15.9″W (night)
- Translators: 94.3 K232FK (Brighton); 95.3 K237GG (Denver)

Links
- Public license information: Public file; LMS
- Webcast: Listen live
- Website: legends953.com

KLVZ (810 AM, "Legends 95.3 FM, 810 AM") is a commercial radio station broadcasting an oldies radio format, focusing on the 1950s through the early 1980s. Licensed to Brighton, Colorado, it serves the Denver metropolitan area. The station is owned by Crawford Broadcasting.

The transmitter is co-located with the tower for sister station KLZ off Welby Road in Denver. In January 2023, the station reported that it restored broadcasting in hybrid mode HD Radio day and night. Programming is also heard on FM translator station K232FK, 94.3 MHz in Brighton as well as K237GG, 95.3 MHz in Denver.

The 94.3 FM translator receives exceptional interference from KMAX-FM in Fort Collins and KILO in Colorado Springs. The Denver area is more affected with KILO while the Northglenn area is affected with KMAX.

== History ==
The station first signed on as KHIL on April 26, 1956. It originally broadcast on 800 kHz. KHIL was a daytimer, required to be off the air at night to protect clear channel station XELO in Ciudad Juarez, Mexico, the Class A station on AM 800. KHIL aired a middle of the road music format.

In 1969, the station was bought by Southwestern Broadcasters, which switched the call sign to KBRN and the format to Christian radio. In 1982, the station was acquired by Interstate Broadcasting Systems (who owned KYMS in Santa Ana at the time), which changed the call letters to KLTT (coupled with adopting the 80 K-Light moniker) but continued the religious format. Interstate Broadcasting Systems would sell KLTT to Mortenson Broadcasting Company in 1988.

Crawford Broadcasting bought the station for $700,000 in 1993. Crawford moved the KLTT call sign and religious format to AM 670, a station which transmits with 50,000 watts in the daytime, compared to AM 800's 1,000-watt signal. The new call letters were KLDC and the station broadcast a gospel music format.

In February 2006, KLDC moved one spot up the dial to 810 kHz. Even though AM 810 is also a clear channel frequency, its Class A stations, KGO San Francisco and WGY Schenectady, New York, are far enough away that the station could finally be given nighttime authorization to stay on the air, although at reduced power. By 2010, AM 810 was broadcasting a Spanish-language Christian radio format as KLVZ.

On August 1, 2011, KLVZ went off the air. There was no word if the station was off the air permanently. The station's website indicated July 31, 2011 was the final day of broadcast. The website thanked listeners, and told them to tune to other Crawford Broadcasting stations.

In October 2016, KLVZ, whose gospel format had moved to AM 1220 KLDC in April, returned to the air with Pop Classics, a mixture of adult standards and oldies from the 50's, 60's and 70's.

On April 13, 2020, KLVZ added a new simulcast translator on 95.3 FM (K237GG) to help boost the station's signal into downtown Denver. The station rebranded as Legends 95.3 FM, 810 AM, and refocused its playlist on oldies from the 1950s, '60s, '70s, and early '80s, some of them little-played as compared to the much tighter playlists of other oldies stations. KLVZ also plays an hourly "legendary flashback" in its rotation, which consists of an adult standard.

== Previous logos ==
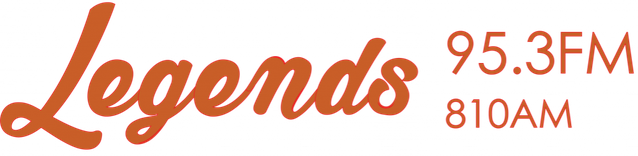
