= KMAX-FM =

- Wellington, Colorado; United States
- Broadcast area: Fort Collins-Greeley
- Frequency: 94.3 MHz
- Branding: KMAX 94.3

Programming
- Format: Mainstream rock
- Affiliations: Compass Media Networks

Ownership
- Owner: Townsquare Media; (Townsquare Media of Ft. Collins, Inc.)
- Sister stations: KKPL; KTRR; KUAD; KARS-FM

History
- First air date: 2002 (as KKQZ)
- Former call signs: KKQZ (2002–2007)
- Call sign meaning: "Max FM" (former branding)

Technical information
- Licensing authority: FCC
- Facility ID: 84497
- Class: C3
- ERP: 8,700 watts
- HAAT: 168 meters (551 ft)
- Transmitter coordinates: 40°55′40.5″N 105°8′35.7″W

Links
- Public license information: Public file; LMS
- Webcast: Listen live
- Website: www.kmax943.com

KMAX-FM (94.3 MHz, KMAX 94.3) is a radio station broadcasting a mainstream rock format. Licensed to Wellington, Colorado, United States, the station serves the Fort Collins-Greeley area. The station is owned by Townsquare Media.

== History ==
The station was granted a construction permit on April 21, 2000, and on October 15, 2002, the station was assigned the call sign KKQZ. The FCC issued a license to cover on February 26, 2003, and on May 7, 2007, the call sign was changed to the current KMAX-FM.

On November 11, 2011, KMAX-FM began stunting with Christmas music branded as "Santa 94.3".

The station changed its programming to mainstream rock as "94.3 Loudwire" on December 3, 2012; the name came from the web magazine of the same name owned by Townsquare.

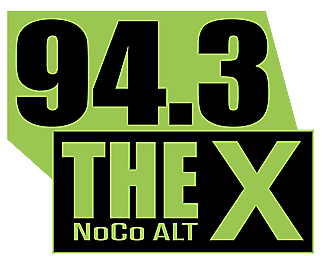
Previous logo

On August 1, 2015, KMAX-FM began stunting as "Spin 94", airing a new format each day with a new format starting with contemporary hit radio as "94.3 Hit FM", followed by a Radio Disney knockoff as "Hide and Seek 94.3", classic country as "Classic 94.3", and finally Christmas music as "Ho Ho 94". On August 5, at noon, 94.3 flipped to alternative rock as "94.3 The X". The announcement had been made at a listener concert for sister station KKPL on the first night of stunting.

On January 10, 2025, KMAX-FM flipped back to mainstream rock as "KMAX 94.3".
