= KFKA =

- Greeley, Colorado; United States
- Broadcast area: Fort Collins-Greeley-Loveland
- Frequency: 1310 kHz

Programming
- Format: News/talk
- Affiliations: CBS, FOX

Ownership
- Owner: Music Ventures, LLC, dba Broadcast Media LLC

History
- First air date: June 1923

Technical information
- Licensing authority: FCC
- Facility ID: 71443
- Class: B
- Power: 5,000 watts day 1,000 watts night
- Transmitter coordinates: 40°21′55.9″N 104°43′57.9″W
- Translator: 103.1 K276GU (Greeley)

Links
- Public license information: Public file; LMS
- Webcast: Listen Live
- Website: 1310kfka.com

KFKA (1310 AM) is a radio station licensed to Greeley, Colorado that serves the Fort Collins-Greeley area. It is the flagship station for the Northern Colorado Bears college football and basketball radio network. It also carries a full slate of high school football and basketball games.

== History ==
=== Pre-history ===
KFKA was first licensed in 1923 to the Colorado State Teachers College (now University of Northern Colorado) in Greeley, Colorado. In addition, the college had a history of radio research and experimentation that dated to before World War One, although information about these early activities is limited.

On June 16, 1914 the Greeley Tribune reported that physics professor Frank L. Abbott had obtained a "$500 wireless outfit" that included a two-kilowatt spark transmitter capable of making Morse code transmissions, and with the help of local radio amateurs Raymond Wolfe and Alphonse Mott was installing an antenna atop the college's administration building. (The administration building was later renamed Cranford Hall). A campus Wireless Club was formed that same year. In early 1917, the college was issued a "Technical and Training School" station license, with the call sign 9YZ, however the station soon had to be dismantled, as all civilian radio station licenses were canceled upon the United States' entry into World War One in April 1917.

KFKA has traditionally traced its pre-history to May 21, 1921, the date that an unlicensed amateur station with the self-assigned call letters "GGM" was transferred by Gordon G. Moss from his family ranch to the Colorado State Teachers College campus. Moss had started this station in 1911, which was shut down in 1917 at the beginning of World War One, but had been revived in 1919 following the end of the wartime restrictions. (Another account states that Moss "began in 1909 with a... hand-wound radio transmitter that transmitted a dot-and-dash signal from the Coronado Building located on the southeast corner of 9th Street and 10th Avenue in downtown Greeley." In addition, others that have been credited with the May 21, 1921 establishment include Frank Abbott and Professor Charles Valentine and H. E. Green.)

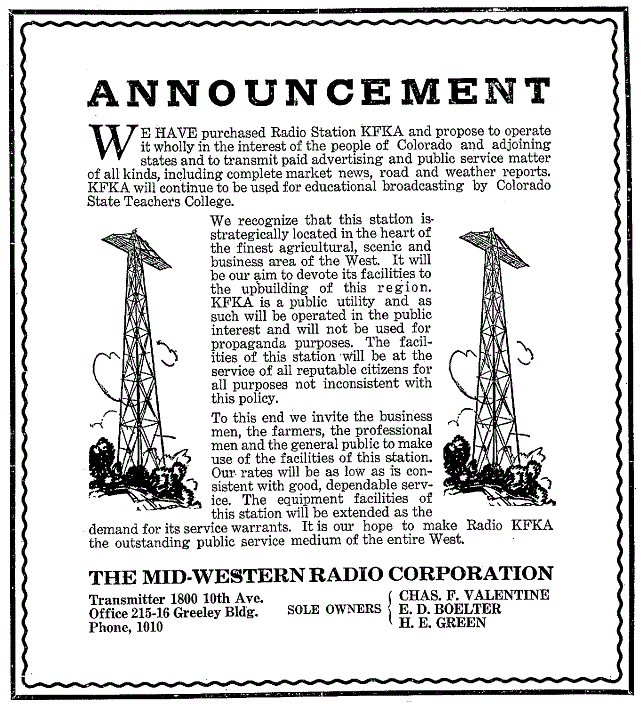
In 1930 KFKA was sold to the Mid-Western Radio Corporation and converted from a non-commercial station to commercial operations.

=== KFKA ===
KFKA was first licensed to the college as a broadcasting station on June 4, 1923. The call letters came from an alphabetical list and had no particular meaning.

The station was initially licensed to broadcast on 1210 kHz but changed its transmitting frequency numerous times during its history, moving to 1100 kHz in 1924, 750 kHz in June 1927, 1200 kHz a few months later, then on November 11, 1928 to 880 kHz (sharing the frequency with KPOF in Denver) as part of a major reallocation under the provisions of the Federal Radio Commission's (FRC) General Order 40. In March 1941, as a result of the North American Regional Broadcasting Agreement, KFKA and KPOF moved to 910 kHz. In 1948 KFKA moved to its current frequency, 1310 kHz, now with unlimited hours.

KFKA was originally operated as a non-commercial educational station. However, the college eventually found it was unable to bear the financial costs. Therefore, on April 11, 1930 KFKA was sold to the Mid-Western Radio Corporation, which converted it into a commercial operation. At the time, school president Dr. G. W. Frasier reported to the FRC that: "During the last two or three years, we have found it to be a financial burden to the institution. We are very enthusiastic about radio and would like to own and operate a station, but at the present time we can not afford to pay the expenses."

The station was transferred from the college campus to 9th Street and 10th Avenue, followed a year later by a move to the Camfield Hotel where it remained until 1964, when it moved to 820 11th Avenue in Greeley.

Logo before translator sign on
