= KTRR =

- Loveland, Colorado; United States
- Broadcast area: Fort Collins-Greeley
- Frequency: 102.5 MHz (HD Radio)
- Branding: Retro 102.5

Programming
- Format: Classic hits

Ownership
- Owner: Townsquare Media; (Townsquare Media of Ft. Collins, Inc.)
- Sister stations: KKPL; KMAX-FM; KUAD-FM

History
- First air date: February 2, 1966
- Former call signs: KLOV-FM (1966–1988)

Technical information
- Licensing authority: FCC
- Facility ID: 50375
- Class: C2
- ERP: 17,000 watts
- HAAT: 234 meters (768 ft)
- Transmitter coordinates: 40°38′30.9″N 104°49′4.9″W

Links
- Public license information: Public file; LMS
- Webcast: Listen live
- Website: retro1025.com

KTRR (102.5 FM, "Retro 102.5") is a commercial radio station broadcasting a classic hits format. Licensed to Loveland, Colorado, United States, the station is owned by Townsquare Media.

== History ==
On February 2, 1966, the station signed on as KLOV-FM. It was the FM counterpart to KLOV (now KXJJ). KLOV-FM originally simulcast the AM station. It later aired an automated easy listening format. In the 1980s, KLOV-FM switched to a mix of easy listening and soft adult contemporary music. Ninety percent of the playlist was vocals.

Through the next twenty-five years, KTRR operated as an adult contemporary or soft adult contemporary station. For a time in the early 2000s, TRI 102 flirted with a hot adult contemporary format before returning to mainstream AC a few years later.

During the 2010, 2012, 2013, and 2014 holiday seasons, TRI 102.5 played all Christmas music, which ran each year from 8 a.m. on November 15 until midnight on December 26.

In 2015 TRI 102 went in a new direction, changing from soft AC to a more current-based format. The station discontinued the evening syndicated Delilah show which the new Sunny 107 picked up. For a time, TRI 102.5 was considered the hot AC station for Fort Collins and Northern Colorado.

The makeover failed to raise ratings, and on September 9, 2016, KTRR flipped to classic hits, retaining the "Tri 102.5" name and most of its 1980s and 1990s hits, but dropping all post-2000 music and bringing back some 1970s titles.

On March 22, 2019, KTRR rebranded as "Retro 102.5".
