= KRRR =

- Cheyenne, Wyoming; United States
- Broadcast area: Cheyenne, Southeastern Wyoming
- Frequency: 104.9 MHz
- Branding: 104.9 KRRR

Programming
- Format: Classic hits

Ownership
- Owner: Brahmin Broadcasting Corp.
- Sister stations: KAZY; KRAE

History
- First air date: June 1, 1997 (as KZCY)
- Former call signs: KZCY (1997–2002)
- Call sign meaning: "Real Rock & Roll"

Technical information
- Licensing authority: FCC
- Facility ID: 35511
- Class: C2
- ERP: 25,500 watts
- HAAT: 35 meters (115 ft)
- Transmitter coordinates: 41°8′4″N 104°41′32″W

Links
- Public license information: Public file; LMS
- Webcast: Listen Live
- Website: 1049krrr.com

KRRR (104.9 FM, 104.9 KRRR) is a radio station broadcasting a classic hits format. Licensed to Cheyenne, Wyoming, United States, the station is currently owned by Brahmin Broadcasting Corporation.

The station carries syndicated shows, including Nina Blackwood's Absolutely 80s Spotlight on weekdays and her full Absolutely 80s show on Saturday nights. Blackwood is a notable figure, recognized as an original MTV VJ. he station broadcasts with an Effective Radiated Power (ERP) of 25,500 watts and its antenna is situated at a height above average terrain (HAAT) of 35 meters (115 ft). The transmitter is east of Cheyenne near Interstate 80.

== History ==
The station went on the air as KZCY on June 1, 1997. On April 1, 2002, the station changed its call sign to the current KRRR. In July 2004, Appaloosa Broadcasting, Inc. completed its acquisition of KRRR-FM, along with KRAE-AM (1480) and KREO-FM (105.3), from Mountain States Radio, Inc. for a total price of $2.2 million.

== Previous logo ==
(KRRR's logo under previous oldies format)
