= KKPL =

Radio station in Cheyenne, Wyoming

- Laporte, Colorado; United States
- Broadcast area: Fort Collins-Greeley; Loveland, Colorado
- Frequency: 99.9 MHz
- Branding: 99.9 The Point

Programming
- Format: Hot adult contemporary
- Affiliations: Compass Media Networks

Ownership
- Owner: Townsquare Media; (Townsquare Media of Ft. Collins, Inc.)
- Sister stations: KMAX-FM KTRR KUAD KARS-FM

History
- First air date: 1997
- Former call signs: KRRR (1996–2002)
- Call sign meaning: "Point"

Technical information
- Licensing authority: FCC
- Facility ID: 54394
- Class: C2
- ERP: 50,000 watts
- HAAT: 150 meters (490 ft)
- Transmitter coordinates: 40°59′22″N 105°3′47″W

Links
- Public license information: Public file; LMS
- Webcast: Listen live
- Website: 999thepoint.com

KKPL (99.9 FM, "99.9 The Point") is a radio station broadcasting a hot adult contemporary format. Licensed to Laporte, Colorado, United States, the station is currently owned by Townsquare Media.

== History ==
The station was assigned the calls KRRR on October 23, 1996. On February 8, 2002 the station became the current KKPL.
