= KSRC =

Radio station in Watkins–Denver, Colorado

- Watkins, Colorado; United States
- Broadcast area: Denver metropolitan area
- Frequency: 101.5 MHz
- Branding: Star 101.5

Programming
- Format: Christian adult contemporary

Ownership
- Owner: Pillar of Fire International; (Pillar of Fire)
- Sister stations: KFCO, KPOF

History
- First air date: 1968 (as KBRU at 101.7)
- Former call signs: KFTM-FM (1968–1976); KBRU (1976–1978); KBRU-FM (1978–2006); KTNI-FM (2006–2010); KJHM (2010–2024)
- Former frequencies: 101.7 MHz (1968–2005)
- Call sign meaning: K StaR Colorado

Technical information
- Licensing authority: FCC
- Facility ID: 38629
- Class: C
- ERP: 97,000 watts
- HAAT: 625 meters (2,051 ft)
- Transmitter coordinates: 39°55′21.8″N 103°58′20.2″W
- Repeater: 101.5 KSRC-FM1 (Commerce City)

Links
- Public license information: Public file; LMS
- Webcast: Listen Live
- Website: star1015denver.com

KSRC (101.5 FM) is a commercial radio station licensed to Watkins, Colorado, and serving the Denver metropolitan area. It is owned by Pillar of Fire and airs a Christian adult contemporary format branded as "Star 101.5". Its studios are located on Parker Road in Aurora.

KSRC has an effective radiated power (ERP) of 97,000 watts at 625 meters (2,051 ft) in height above average terrain (HAAT), and broadcasts from a tower about 60 miles northeast of Denver near Leader, shared with sister station KFCO. Because of the station's weak signal strength in Downtown Denver, as well as in the western suburbs (Arvada, Lakewood, and Wheat Ridge), there is a 20,000 watt co-channel booster station in Commerce City, KSRC-FM1, which helps the signal reach closer to Denver.

== History ==
=== KBRU (1968–2006) ===
KSRC was originally KFTM-FM at 101.7 MHz, licensed to Fort Morgan. It had an adult contemporary format and changed call signs to KBRU, later KBRU-FM, in 1976. It later switched its city of license to Strasburg, Colorado, and moved its dial position to 101.5 MHz.

=== Adult standards (2006–2008) ===
The station was branded as "101.5 Martini On The Rockies" as KTNI, airing an adult standards format.

=== Modern rock (2008–2009) ===
In February 2008, it became "Indie" with a modern rock format. When the station changed, they used an on-air clicking sound effect of an iPod being randomly selected to play a song supposedly on the station's music playlist, to suggest the next song could be anything that was available on the device. This approach was used for a couple of months until it lost popularity with listeners.

According to FCC filings, the station's owner (KBRU-FM, LLC - a subsidiary of Denver Radio Company) sought bankruptcy protection in February 2008 and has since emerged from bankruptcy.

On January 16, 2009, the debtor in possession for Denver Radio Company received permission to operate the station temporarily without a main studio within 25 miles of the community of license, which is a requirement for all commercial radio stations. It planned to run the station from studios also used by KONN in Aurora, Colorado.

=== Talk (2009–2010) ===
The station was sold to Max Media in 2009. Upon the completion of the sale, on July 31, 2009, at 9 a.m., KTNI dropped the alternative rock format, which moved online as Indie303.com, and began a week-long stunt with a "stripper format", calling itself "The Pole." The stunt was sponsored by local strip club Shotgun Willie's. At 4 p.m. on August 6, KTNI flipped to conservative talk as "101.5 The Truth."

The Truth was among Denver's lowest rated stations, according to Arbitron's PPM rating service. Local paid programming included "Green Rights Radio", "Lacrosse Talk" (which is believed to be the only radio show dedicated to the sport), "real talk 360" and "Zinna". It carried much of Talk Radio Network's programming lineup, including The Phil Hendrie Show, the alleged cult leader Roy Masters, Mancow's Morning Madhouse, Jerry Doyle, The Savage Nation, and Rusty Humphries. Tape-delayed broadcasts of Neal Boortz, Curtis Sliwa and Phil Valentine completed the station's weekday lineup.

=== Rhythmic oldies (2010–2012) ===
On September 3, 2010, at 4 p.m., KTNI changed its format to Rhythmic Oldies/Urban Oldies as "Jammin' 101.5." The first song on "Jammin'" was "Jam On It" by Newcleus. This was the second time the format and moniker had been used in the market. The first time was from May 1999 to December 2005, when it was on KDJM (now KKSE-FM). In November 2010, the station brought back former KDJM afternoon DJ Cha Cha to host mornings, as well as adding afternoon personality "SLiM" (formerly of KMEL/San Francisco). The station used jingles formerly heard on KPTT during its run as a Rhythmic AC station.

On September 23, 2010, KTNI's call letters were changed to KJHM-FM to reflect the "Jammin'" moniker.

=== R&B (2012–2015) ===
In late June 2012, KJHM shifted from a Rhythmic Oldies format to a mix of Urban Adult Contemporary and Urban Oldies as "The New Jammin' 101.5, True Old School and Smooth R&B", under the direction of veteran programmer Mike Marino, formerly of KHHT/Los Angeles. Marino was quick to say KJHM plays R&B hits and classics for a mass-appeal audience who grew up listening to that music.

=== Rhythmic AC (2015–2016) ===
On October 1, 2015, at 5 p.m., KJHM shifted to a Rhythmic AC format, dropping the 1960s, 1970s and 1980s songs, and refocusing the playlist on 1990s rhythmic hits, 2000s rhythmic/pop songs, and current/recurrent rhythmic/pop titles. The change was made due to the results of a listener survey posted on the website. KJHM also changed its slogan to "The Next Generation."

=== Rhythmic oldies (2016–2022) ===
Former logo

On March 18, 2016, KJHM reverted to Rhythmic oldies. The station's second go-around with the format included the return of 1970s and 1980s tracks (along with less neo-soul and more disco), while retaining some 1990s and 2000s rhythmic/R&B tracks, as well as some re-currents and currents held over from the previous format. The change was made due to poor ratings.

=== Shift to urban AC (2022–2024) ===
By 2022, some newer songs were added in to the playlist, making KJHM an oldies-leaning Rhythmic AC station. On January 9, 2023, alongside additions to its on-air lineup, the station adopted the new slogan "The Mile High Vibe", and shifted to urban adult contemporary.

=== Christian contemporary (since 2024) ===
On December 22, 2023, Max Media announced they would sell KJHM and KFCO to Pillar of Fire, owner of KPOF, for $7.775 million. The sale was completed on April 1, 2024; on April 4, KJHM changed its format to Christian adult contemporary, with the new name "Star 101.5". On April 15, 2024, KJHM changed its call sign to KSRC to match the "Star" branding.
