= KLTT =

Christian talk radio station in Commerce City–Denver, Colorado

- Commerce City, Colorado; United States
- Broadcast area: Denver-Boulder-Colorado Springs area
- Frequency: 670 kHz (HD Radio)
- Branding: KLTT 670 The Truth

Programming
- Format: Christian radio

Ownership
- Owner: Crawford Broadcasting Co.; (KLZ Radio, Inc.)
- Sister stations: KLZ, KLDC, KLVZ

History
- First air date: 1996
- Former call signs: KLDC (1996)

Technical information
- Licensing authority: FCC
- Facility ID: 35191
- Class: B
- Power: 50,000 watts (day); 1,400 watts (night)
- Transmitter coordinates: 39°57′19.9″N 104°43′51.9″W
- Translator: 95.1 K236CQ (Commerce City)

Links
- Public license information: Public file; LMS
- Webcast: Listen live
- Website: 670kltt.com

KLTT (670 AM) is a radio station broadcasting a Christian format licensed to Commerce City, Colorado, United States, and serving Denver and Colorado Springs. The station is currently owned by Crawford Broadcasting and is licensed to Colorado subsidiary KLZ Radio, Inc. With its 50,000-watt daytime signal, KLTT broadcasts can be received throughout most of the state. This powerful daytime signal reaches into southeastern Wyoming, northeastern New Mexico, and into the western portions of Nebraska and Kansas. At night, the station reduces power to 1,400 watts, with a directional signal to the north and south to protect Class-A clear-channel station WSCR in Chicago.

== History ==
The station began broadcasting in early 1996, holding the call sign KLDC and airing a religious format. On April 5, 1996, its call sign was changed to KLTT.

Former logo
