= KFCO =

Radio station in Bennett–Denver, Colorado

- Bennett, Colorado; United States
- Broadcast area: Denver metropolitan area
- Frequency: 107.1 MHz
- Branding: The New Flo 107.1

Programming
- Format: Christian hip hop

Ownership
- Owner: Pillar of Fire International
- Sister stations: KSRC, KPOF

History
- First air date: 1985 (as KKDD)
- Former call signs: KCNQ (1979–1985, CP); KKDD (1985–1991); KSIR (1991–1993); KSIR-FM (1993–2006); KSYY-FM (2006–2008); KONN-FM (2008–2009); KDHT-FM (2009–2014); KXDE (2014–2015)
- Call sign meaning: Flo Colorado

Technical information
- Licensing authority: FCC
- Facility ID: 35023
- Class: C
- ERP: 97,000 watts
- HAAT: 624 meters (2,047 ft)
- Transmitter coordinates: 39°55′21.8″N 103°58′20.2″W
- Repeater: 107.1 KFCO-FM3 (Aurora)

Links
- Public license information: Public file; LMS
- Webcast: Listen Live
- Website: flodenver.com

KFCO (107.1 FM) is a commercial radio station broadcasting a Christian hip hop format, licensed to Bennett, Colorado, and serving the Denver metropolitan area. It is owned by Pillar of Fire International with its radio studios and offices on Parker Road in Aurora.

KFCO has an effective radiated power (ERP) of 97,000 watts. Its transmitter is on Deter-Winters Road in Byers in rural Adams County, about 40 miles east of Denver. A booster station, powered at 20,000 watts, is located in Aurora, also broadcasting at 107.1 MHz.

== History ==
=== Soft adult contemporary (2006–2008) ===
On March 20, 2006, as the station was being relocated to Denver, its call sign changed to KSYY-FM to stand for "Sassy 107" and its soft adult contemporary format.

=== Top 40 (2008–2009) ===
The format lasted until the morning of February 7, 2008, when the station began stunting with songs featuring "One" in the title. At 1 PM that day, KSYY flipped to Top 40 as "One FM". The first song on "One FM" was "Yeah!" by Usher. On February 29, 2008, its call sign changed to KONN. At first, the station was billing their direction as "Rhythm-based hit music," but in actuality, has moved into a more mainstream Top 40/CHR approach since the format flip.

=== Rhythmic top 40 (2009–2012) ===
On April 1, 2009, "One FM" changed its branding to "Hot 107.1". Competing in the Rhythmic/Top 40 ratings against KONN were KQKS and KPTT.

On December 15, 2009, KONN changed its call letters to KDHT to better reflect its current branding. The KDHT call letters were on another Denver station in 1993 on 92.5, which is now KKSE-FM, before being dropped and picked up by Emmis Communications for the company's station in Austin, Texas, on 93.3 FM (now KGSR).

=== Dance (2012) ===
On March 30, 2012, at 6 p.m., KDHT flipped to a Dance music format while keeping the same moniker and airstaff in place. The format and playlist consisted mostly of current Dance, Electronica, and remixed Rhythmic/Pop hits. The first song under the dance format was "Bad Romance" by Lady Gaga.

=== Adult hits (2012–2014) ===
On November 30, 2012, at 3 p.m., after playing "Unforgivable" by Armin Van Buuren, the station began stunting with marijuana-themed music (in reference to the recent legalization of personal marijuana usage in Colorado), branded as "Pot 107.1." The first song on the "Pot" stunting was "Rocky Mountain High" by John Denver.

The stunt lasted until 3 p.m. the following Monday, when, after playing "Smoke on the Water" by Deep Purple, "Jack FM" returned to Denver with "a bunch of songs in a row", with "What I Like About You" by The Romantics being the first song played. This marks the second time the format/moniker was used in the Denver market, the first time being on KJAC (105.5) from April 2004 until September 2012, when it flipped to ESPN Radio.

=== Alternative (2014) ===
On March 24, 2014, at Noon, KDHT changed their format to alternative rock, branded as "107X", launching with 5,000 songs in a row through April 7 of that year. The first song on "107X" was "Anarchy in the U.K." by The Sex Pistols.

On March 27, 2014, KDHT changed the call letters to KXDE to go with the "107X" branding. Likely due to the station's rimshot signal, the format never could compete against iHeartMedia's KTCL and KBPI, registering just a 0.4 share in the December 2014 Nielsen Audio PPM ratings.

=== Classic hip-hop (2014–2018) ===
Just nine months after flipping to "X", on December 24, 2014, at 2:45 p.m., after playing "Cigarette Daydreams" by Cage the Elephant, KXDE began a 15-minute stunt with a loop of "Ludacrismas" by Ludacris. At 3 p.m., KXDE flipped to classic hip-hop, branded as "Fly 107.1", launching with a brief mixshow of all-Run-D.M.C. songs, followed by "Candy Shop" by 50 Cent.

Four weeks later, on January 16, 2015, KXDE, likely due to trademark infringement problems with the SiriusXM webcast "Sirius XM Fly", rebranded as "Flo 107.1". On January 27, 2015, KXDE changed their call letters to KFCO. By the fall of 2016, KFCO began adding more recent music; by the summer of 2017, KFCO began evolving to Rhythmic CHR with the addition of currents and re-currents, though the station retained a heavy classic hip-hop lean.

=== Rhythmic Top 40 (2018–2020) ===
By June 2018, KFCO shifted completely to a current-based Rhythmic.

=== Top 40 (2020–2021) ===
On May 22, 2020, at 3 p.m., KFCO flipped back to Top 40/CHR, and revived the “Hot 107.1” branding. The new direction had a Rhythmic lean, but featured more uptempo Rhythmic and Dance pop currents to distinguish KFCO from Mainstream rival KPTT and Rhythmic rival KQKS.

=== Classic hip-hop (2021–2024) ===
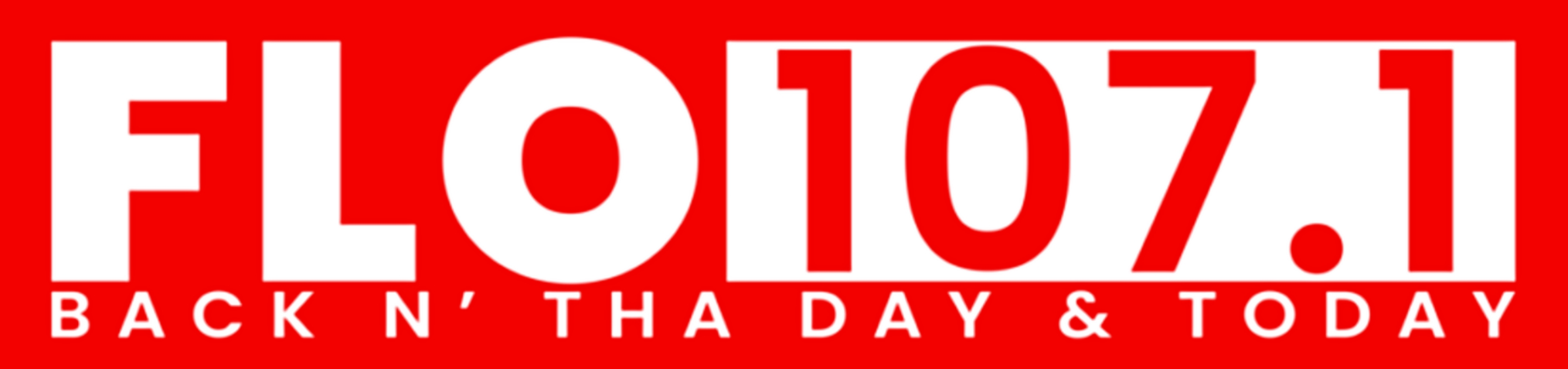
Previous logo

At 5 p.m. on August 10, 2021, just 16 months after the relaunch of "Hot", the station began stunting again, this time airing a loop of teasers of potential formats as "Flip 107.1”, while promoting a format change to take place at 7 a.m. on August 12. At that time, KFCO flipped back to rhythmic CHR and the “Flo 107.1” moniker, with "Nuthin' But a 'G' Thang" by Dr. Dre being the first song played. The station’s second go-around with the format included a heavy emphasis on classic hip hop/R&B music, along with some currents and recurrents. On April 14, 2022, KFCO shifted back to classic hip hop while retaining the "Flo 107.1" branding, and positioned itself as "Back N Tha Day”.

=== Christian hip hop (since 2024) ===
On December 22, 2023, Max Media announced they would sell KFCO and KJHM to Pillar of Fire, owner of KPOF, for $7.775 million. The sale was completed on April 1, 2024; on April 4, KFCO flipped to Christian hip hop, branded as "Kingdom 107.1", and requested the new call sign KNDM-FM. On April 19, the station dropped the Kingdom branding and rebranded as simply KFCO 107.1; Fort Myers, Florida station WJYO holds trademarks related to "Kingdom" in relation to Christian radio. After three months of branding under the KFCO call letters, the station changed to "The New Flo 107.1" on July 25.
