= KBJD =

Radio station in Denver

Denver, Colorado; United States
- Frequency: 1650 kHz
- Branding: Radio La Red

Programming
- Language: Spanish
- Format: Christian

Ownership
- Owner: Salem Media Group; (Salem Media of Colorado, Inc.)
- Sister stations: KNUS, KRKS, KRKS-FM

Technical information
- Licensing authority: FCC
- Facility ID: 87151
- Class: B
- Power: 10,000 watts day 1,000 watts night
- Transmitter coordinates: 39°47′56″N 104°58′12″W

Links
- Public license information: Public file; LMS
- Webcast: Listen Live
- Website: radiolared.net

KBJD (1650 AM) is a Spanish language Christian teaching formatted radio station owned by Salem Media Group. The station is branded as "Radio La RED", and serves the Denver, Colorado area by providing Christian teaching programming in Spanish.

== History ==
KBJD originated as the expanded band "twin" of an existing station on the standard AM band. On March 17, 1997, the FCC announced that eighty-eight stations had been given permission to move to newly available "Expanded Band" transmitting frequencies, ranging from 1610 to 1700 kHz, with KRKS in Denver authorized to move from 990 to 1650 kHz.

The construction permit for the new station on 1650 kHz, also located in Denver, was assigned the call letters KBJD on August 10, 1998. The FCC's initial policy was that both the original station and its expanded band counterpart could operate simultaneously for up to five years, after which owners would have to turn in one of the two licenses, depending on whether they preferred the new assignment or elected to remain on the original frequency. The five-year period ended on February 20, 2006, but both stations were authorized to continue to operate under temporary six-month STA orders while an FCC review, which has resulted in multiple extensions of the deadline, is underway. One restriction is that the FCC has generally required paired original and expanded band stations to remain under common ownership.

In January 2003, Salem Communications reformatted KBJD from Contemporary Christian music "The Rock" to conservative talk radio as "KNUS 2" to "better complement its other Talk outlet in the market", sister station KNUS.

Former logo

On October 29, 2007, KBJD changed formats from talk to Spanish language Christian.

On January 6, 2022, KBJD rebranded as "Radio La RED".
