= Media in Greeley, Colorado =

Greeley is a center of media in north-central Colorado. The following is a list of media outlets in the city.

== Print ==
=== Newspapers ===
The Greeley Tribune is the city's primary newspaper, published daily. In addition, Swift Communications publishes a weekly agribusiness paper, the Fence Post, in the city.

== Radio ==
Greeley is a principal city of the Fort Collins-Greeley radio market. In its Fall 2013 ranking of radio markets by population, Arbitron ranked Fort Collins-Greeley 117th in the United States. Due to Greeley's proximity to Denver, local listeners can also receive the signal of most radio stations broadcasting from the Denver radio market.

The following is a list of radio stations that broadcast from or are licensed to Greeley.

=== AM ===
Frequency	Callsign	Format	City of License	Notes
1310	KFKA	News/Talk	Greeley, Colorado	-
1450	KGRE	Regional Mexican	Greeley, Colorado	-

=== FM ===
Frequency	Callsign	Format	City of License	Notes
91.5	KUNC	Public	Greeley, Colorado	NPR
96.1	KSME	Top 40	Greeley, Colorado	Broadcasts from Loveland, Colorado
102.1	KGRE-FM	Regional Mexican	Estes Park, Colorado	Broadcasts from Greeley
104.7	KELS-LP	Variety	Greeley, Colorado	-

== Television ==
Greeley is in the Denver television market. Due to Greeley's proximity to Cheyenne, Wyoming, local viewers can also receive the signal of several television stations broadcasting in the Cheyenne television market.

Display Channel	Network	Callsign	City of License	Notes
38.1	TBN	KPJR-TV	Greeley, Colorado	-
38.2	The Church Channel	KPJR-TV	Greeley, Colorado	-
38.3	JUCE TV	KPJR-TV	Greeley, Colorado	-
38.4	TBN Enlace USA	KPJR-TV	Greeley, Colorado	-
38.5	Smile of a Child TV	KPJR-TV	Greeley, Colorado	-
