= KNUS =

News/talk radio station in Denver

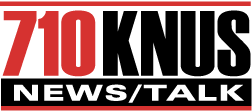
- Denver, Colorado; United States
- Broadcast area: Denver metropolitan area
- Frequency: 710 kHz
- Branding: 710 KNUS

Programming
- Format: Conservative talk
- Affiliations: Salem Radio Network; NBC News Radio

Ownership
- Owner: Salem Media Group; (Salem Media of Colorado, Inc.)
- Sister stations: KBJD; KRKS; KRKS-FM

History
- First air date: May 1941
- Former call signs: KMYR (1941–1959); KICN (1959–1961); KBTR (1961–1973); KERE (1973–1981); KNUS (1981–1988); KBPI (1988–1989); KBXG (1989–1990)
- Call sign meaning: NUS sounds like "news"

Technical information
- Licensing authority: FCC
- Facility ID: 42377
- Class: B
- Power: 5,000 watts
- Transmitter coordinates: 39°57′18.9″N 104°51′2.9″W

Links
- Public license information: Public file; LMS
- Webcast: Listen live
- Website: 710knus.com

KNUS (710 AM) is a commercial radio station licensed to Denver, Colorado, United States. Owned by the Salem Media Group, it airs a conservative talk format, with studios on South Vaughn Way in Aurora.

KNUS's transmitter is sited off Brighton Road near the South Platte River in Brighton.

== History ==
=== Early years ===
The station signed on the air in May 1941 as KMYR and broadcast on 1340 kHz. It was powered at 250 watts, a fraction of its current output. Its studios were on Stout Street in Denver and it was owned by F.W. Meyer. The call letters represented his last name.

The station moved to 710 kHz in April 1956. When it was KBTR, it had a news partnership with KBTV (channel 9). This ended in the mid-1980s. From the 1970s to the late 1980s, it was owned by Mullins Broadcasting. In the late 1980s, the station changed its call letters to KBXG when it was bought by a Boulder coal company. In the 1990s, the station was the home of Ken Hamblin, Gary Tessler, Alan Dumas, Carol McKinley, Nia Bender, Pierre Wolfe, Mason Lewis, Warren Byrne, Jim Turner, Gabby Gourmet and Ron Krieter. It broadcast from the 23rd floor studios of the Tabor Center.

In the late 1980s, music formats on AM stations were having ratings problems, as more people tuned to the FM dial. For about a year, 710 AM had no format of its own. Instead, it simulcast the active rock format of its sister station, KBPI-FM, from 1988 to 1989.

=== Rush Limbaugh appearance ===
In 1993, KNUS was Denver's first station to carry The Rush Limbaugh Show. When Limbaugh came to nearby Fort Collins for an appearance, thousands of people showed up. KNUS host Jann Scott also did a live show from Fort Collins where some negative comments were made about Rush. Limbaugh heard the show from his hotel room and came over. Limbaugh and Scott bantered back and forth and then ended up telling jokes and talking to the crowd for two hours.

Peter Boyles returned to KNUS in the summer of 2013 after being fired by another local talk radio station that objected to the racial nature of his on-air comments. He had been dubbed "The Dean of Denver Radio Talk Show Hosts". He retired from five days a week in April 2022, but returned to the station that August to host a weekend program. He currently hosts a four-hour show on Saturdays.

In 2018, KNUS was the winner of the Colorado Broadcasters Association's "Best Regularly Scheduled Newscast" award.

=== Chuck and Julie Show controversy ===
On December 18, 2019, the Chuck & Julie show was cancelled. Co-host Chuck Bonniwell stated, when introducing a segment discussing the impeachment of Donald Trump, "You know, you wish for a nice school shooting to interrupt the nonstop impeachment coverage." This happened one week after another KNUS host, Kirk Widlund denied allegations that he had posted white-supremacist memes online.

In July 2024, host Randy Corporon left KNUS. He was notified in June that Salem Media Group would not be renewing his contract.

== Programming ==
Jeff Hunt and Bill Thorpe host the station's lone local program; the remainder of the program schedule consists of syndicated conservative talk shows, many from the Salem Radio Network.

== Former on-air personalities ==
Alan Berg, Ken Hamblin, Jann Scott, Marty Nalitz, Randy Corporon, Jimmy Lakey, Mike Rosen, Alan Dumas, Jim Turner, Gary Tessler, Carol McKinley, Nia Bender, Brandon Scott, Pierre Wolfe, Warren Byrne, Gabby Gourmet, Mason Lewis, Bill Jones, Connor Shreve, Steve Kelley, Krista Kafer, Dan Caplis, Chuck Bonniwell and Julie Hayden, Craig Silverman, Jimmy Sengenberger, Steffan Tubbs, Ross Kaminsky, Matt Dunn, Jeff Hunt, Bill Thorpe.
