= KLDC =

Denver, Colorado; United States
- Broadcast area: Denver metropolitan area
- Frequency: 1220 kHz (HD Radio)

Programming
- Format: Christian talk and teaching

Ownership
- Owner: Crawford Broadcasting; (KLZ Radio)
- Sister stations: KLZ, KLTT, KLVZ

History
- First air date: September 1954
- Former call signs: KFSO (1954–1977); KBNO (1977–1999); KLVZ (1999–2007)

Technical information
- Licensing authority: FCC
- Facility ID: 12364
- Class: D
- Power: 1,000 watts day 12 watts night
- Transmitter coordinates: 39°41′0″N 105°0′24″W

Links
- Public license information: Public file; LMS
- Webcast: Listen live
- Website: 1220kldc.com

KLDC (1220 AM) is a licensed radio station in Denver, Colorado. The station is currently owned by Crawford Broadcasting Company, DBA KLZ Radio, Inc. KLDC, along with sister station 670 KLTT, broadcasts a Christian talk and teaching radio format. While KLTT carries mostly national religious leaders, KLDC is home for numerous local preachers and ministries. Two exceptions are David Jeremiah and Charles Stanley, both heard on KLDC.

AM 1220 is a Mexican clear channel frequency; because of this, KLDC broadcasts at a low power at night of only 12 watts to prevent interference with other stations. Daytime power is also fairly low, at 1,000 watts. By contrast, KOA in Denver runs at 50,000 watts around the clock.

== History ==
KLDC signed on in September 1954 as KFSO.

The station was previously known as KLVZ. On September 10, 2007, it changed its call sign to KLDC.

Logo when simulcasting with 95.3

Its transmitter is located on Ruby Hill in Denver. Its backup transmitter is in Westminster at the KLZ Transmitting site.
