= Mass media in Fort Collins, Colorado =

Fort Collins, Colorado is a center of media in north-central Colorado. The following is a list of media outlets based in the city.

== Print ==
=== Magazines ===
- Fort Collins Senior Voice, seniors' lifestyle, monthly
- The New Scene, entertainment and lifestyle in the Northern Colorado Area, monthly
- (SALT), art and entertainment, monthly
- College Avenue, student magazine, arts and entertainment, monthly

=== Newspapers ===
- The Fort Collins Coloradoan is the city's primary for-profit newspaper, published daily.
- The Fort Collins Report is the city's newest non-profit news agency.
- Rocky Mountain Collegian, Colorado State University student newspaper, four days a week
- North Forty News, events, news, arts and more, monthly

== Radio ==
Fort Collins is a principal city of the Fort Collins-Greeley radio market. In its Fall 2013 ranking of radio markets by population, Arbitron ranked Fort Collins-Greeley 117th in the United States. Due to Fort Collins's proximity to Denver, local listeners can also receive the signal of most radio stations broadcasting from the Denver radio market.

The following is a list of radio stations that broadcast from and/or are licensed to Fort Collins.

=== AM ===
Frequency	Callsign	Format	City of License	Notes
1410	KIIX	Classic Country	Fort Collins, Colorado	Broadcasts from Loveland, Colorado

=== FM ===
Frequency	Callsign	Format	City of License	Notes
88.3	KVXO	Classical Public	Fort Collins, Colorado	Colorado Public Radio
88.9	KRFC	Public	Fort Collins, Colorado	-
90.5	KCSU-FM	Alternative	Fort Collins, Colorado	Colorado State University college radio
93.7	KAZY	Active Rock	Cheyenne, Wyoming	locally heard in Fort Collins, Co.
94.9	K235BT	Alternative Rock	Fort Collins, Colorado	-
95.3	K237CY	Christian Contemporary	Fort Collins, Colorado	Translator of KTLF, Colorado Springs, Colorado
107.9	KBPI	Active Rock	Fort Collins, Colorado	Owned By i Heart Media, Inc

Fort Collins is also location of the time signal transmitter WWV working in the shortwave range and of WWVB, which transmits on 60 kHz the time signal for the most radio-controlled clocks in North America.

== Television ==
Fort Collins is in the Denver television market. Due to Fort Collins's proximity to Cheyenne, Wyoming, local viewers can also receive the signal of several television stations broadcasting in the Cheyenne television market.

The following is a list of television stations that broadcast from and/or are licensed to Fort Collins.

Display Channel	Network	Callsign	City of License	Notes
6.1	PBS	KRMA-TV	Fort Collins, Colorado	Translator of KRMA-TV, Denver, Colorado
6.2	PBS Kids	KRMA-TV	Fort Collins, Colorado	Translator of KRMA-TV, Denver, Colorado
6.3	Create/World	KRMA-TV	Fort Collins, Colorado	Translator of KRMA-TV, Denver, Colorado
11	Collegian TV	CTV 11	Fort Collins, Colorado	Colorado State University's student news station
22.1	Fox	KFCT	Fort Collins, Colorado	Satellite station of KDVR, Denver, Colorado
22.2	Antenna TV	KFCT	Fort Collins, Colorado	Satellite station of KDVR, Denver, Colorado
22.3	TBD	KFCT	Fort Collins, Colorado	Satellite station of KDVR, Denver, Colorado
24.1	-	KMLN-LD	Fort Collins, Colorado	-
44.1	Daystar	KDNF-LD	Fort Collins, Colorado	-
59.1	ION	KPXC-TV	Fort Collins, Colorado	Satellite station of KPXC-TV, Denver, Colorado
59.2	Bounce TV	KPXC-TV	Fort Collins, Colorado	Satellite station of KPXC-TV, Denver, Colorado
59.3	Court TV	KPXC-TV	Fort Collins, Colorado	Satellite station of KPXC-TV, Denver, Colorado
59.4	Defy TV	KPXC-TV	Fort Collins, Colorado	Satellite station of KPXC-TV, Denver, Colorado
59.5	Scripps News	KPXC-TV	Fort Collins, Colorado	Satellite station of KPXC-TV, Denver, Colorado
59.6	Grit	KPXC-TV	Fort Collins, Colorado	Satellite station of KPXC-TV, Denver, Colorado
59.7	Jewelry TV	KPXC-TV	Fort Collins, Colorado	Satellite station of KPXC-TV, Denver, Colorado
59.8	HSN2	KPXC-TV	Fort Collins, Colorado	Satellite station of KPXC-TV, Denver, Colorado
