= KCWA =

- Loveland, Colorado; United States
- Broadcast area: Fort Collins-Greeley
- Frequency: 93.9 MHz

Programming
- Format: Christian adult contemporary

Ownership
- Owner: WAY-FM Network; (Hope Media Group)
- Sister stations: KXWA

History
- Former call signs: KKNG (1992–1997); KSNA (1997–2001); KKHI (2001–2002); KRQU (2002–2008); KUSZ (2008–2010); KRKU (2010–2011)
- Call sign meaning: Colorado Way

Technical information
- Licensing authority: FCC
- Facility ID: 9761
- Class: A
- ERP: 580 watts
- HAAT: 319 meters (1,047 ft)
- Transmitter coordinates: 40°29′37″N 105°10′53″W

Links
- Public license information: Public file; LMS

KCWA (93.9 FM) is a radio station licensed to Loveland, Colorado, United States. It is owned by the WAY-FM Network, through licensee Hope Media Group. Its studios are in Longmont, and its transmitter is on Milner Mountain northwest of Loveland.
