= KXWA =

Centennial, Colorado; United States
- Broadcast area: Denver, Colorado
- Frequency: 101.9 MHz (HD Radio)
- Branding: WAY-FM

Programming
- Format: Christian adult contemporary
- Subchannels: HD2: Spanish Christian adult contemporary HD3: Contemporary worship music

Ownership
- Owner: WAY-FM Network; (Hope Media Group)
- Sister stations: KCWA

History
- First air date: January 28, 1967 (as KRYT-FM)
- Former call signs: KRYT-FM (1967–1976); KINX (1976–1979); KKCS-FM (1979–2005); KGDQ (2005–2008); KKHI (2008–2011)
- Call sign meaning: For "Way FM"

Technical information
- Licensing authority: FCC
- Facility ID: 70822
- Class: C3
- ERP: 9,500 watts
- HAAT: 163 meters (535 ft)
- Transmitter coordinates: 39°23′7″N 105°2′52″W

Links
- Public license information: Public file; LMS
- Webcast: Listen Live
- Website: wayfm.com vidaunida.com (HD2) worship247.com (HD3)

KXWA (101.9 FM) is a radio station licensed to Centennial, Colorado, United States. The station serves the Denver metropolitan area and is currently owned by the WAY-FM Network. Its studios are located in Longmont, and the transmitter is near Castle Rock.

== History ==
=== In Colorado Springs ===
On January 14, 1965, William S. Cook obtained a construction permit to build a new radio station in Colorado Springs. It went on the air January 28, 1967, as KRYT-FM, a companion to daytime-only KRYT (1530 AM). On December 6, 1976, the KRYT name moved fully to AM, and the station adopted an adult contemporary format as KINX, with KRYT AM going to disco music.

In 1979, the two stations (then KXXV and KINX) were acquired by Mountain Center Broadcasting Company, part of Texas-based Center Group Broadcasting, for $765,000. Walton Stations acquired both stations in separate transactions in 1982, with the FM going for $1.02 million. Under Walton, the station broadcast country music and became a major player in the market, being the top-billing station from 1989 to 1997 and the highest-rated local station in much of that time period.

Walton sold KKCS-FM to Superior Broadcasting in 2003 for $18 million.

=== Denver market move-in ===
Superior sold KKCS-FM to Bustos Media for $16 million in 2005, retaining the intellectual property and moving it to Cañon City's 104.5 MHz, which it leased. Meanwhile, Bustos moved KKCS-FM north from Colorado Springs to Centennial, with a transmitter on Monument Hill, to target the Denver market. In Denver, it changed its format to Regional Mexican as KGDQ "La Gran D", the third Spanish-language FM station in the region.

Bustos sold KKHI in 2010 to Way-FM Communications for conversion to its Christian radio network. The call sign was changed to KXWA that December.
