= KRKS (AM) =

- Denver, Colorado; United States
- Broadcast area: Denver metropolitan area
- Frequency: 990 kHz
- Branding: 990 AM The Word

Programming
- Format: Christian talk and teaching
- Affiliations: SRN News

Ownership
- Owner: Salem Media Group; (Salem Media of Colorado, Inc.)
- Sister stations: KRKS-FM, KBJD, KNUS

History
- First air date: August 1, 1953
- Former call signs: KLIR (1953–1970)

Technical information
- Licensing authority: FCC
- Facility ID: 58632
- Class: B
- Power: 6,500 watts (day); 4,200 watts (critical hours); 390 watts (night)
- Transmitter coordinates: 39°47′57″N 104°58′12″W

Links
- Public license information: Public file; LMS
- Webcast: Listen live
- Website: krks.com

KRKS (990 AM, "990 The Word") is a commercial radio station licensed to Denver, Colorado, United States. Owned by Salem Media Group, it airs a Christian format with studios on South Vaughn Way in Aurora, and transmitter sited off of East 56th Avenue in North Washington. KRKS with co-owned KRKS-FM are known as "The Word," but carry most programs at different times of the day.

== History ==
On August 1, 1953, the station first signed on as KLIR. It was a 1,000 watt daytimer, required to be off the air at night. It was owned by George Basil Anderson during many of its early years. In 1959, Anderson put KLIR-FM on the air (now KIMN).

In the 1970s, KLIR got a boost to 5,000 watts, but it still had to sign off at sunset. On November 1, 1970, the call sign was changed to KRKS; the station retained its religious format while KLIR-FM continued as a beautiful music station. In the 1980s, KRKS was granted authorization by the Federal Communications Commission (FCC) to broadcast around the clock, but at the reduced nighttime power of 390 watts.

In 1993, Salem Communications paid $400,000 to acquire KRKS. Salem owned Christian radio stations in several dozen large and medium markets around the United States, and continued KRKS's format. The following year, 94.7 FM was bought by Salem and paired up with AM 990, as KRKS-FM.

=== Expanded Band assignment ===
On March 17, 1997, the FCC announced that eighty-eight stations had been given permission to move to newly available "Expanded Band" transmitting frequencies, ranging from 1610 to 1700 kHz, with KRKS authorized to move from 990 to 1650 kHz.

A construction permit for the expanded band station, also located in Denver, was assigned the call letters KBJD on August 10, 1998. The FCC's initial policy was that both the original station and its expanded band counterpart could operate simultaneously for up to five years, after which owners would have to turn in one of the two licenses, depending on whether they preferred the new assignment or elected to remain on the original frequency. However, this deadline has been extended multiple times, and both stations remain authorized. One restriction is that the FCC has generally required paired original and expanded band stations to remain under common ownership.
