= KRKS-FM =

- Lafayette, Colorado; United States
- Broadcast area: Denver-Boulder-Longmont and Denver metropolitan area
- Frequency: 94.7 MHz
- Branding: 94.7 FM The Word

Programming
- Format: Christian talk and teaching
- Affiliations: SRN News

Ownership
- Owner: Salem Media Group; (Salem Media of Colorado, Inc.)
- Sister stations: KRKS, KBJD, KNUS

History
- First air date: March 15, 1971
- Former call signs: KBVL (1971–1986); KHIH (1986–1993)
- Call sign meaning: Derived from KRKS

Technical information
- Licensing authority: FCC
- Facility ID: 58631
- Class: C
- ERP: 100,000 watts
- HAAT: 300 meters (980 ft)
- Transmitter coordinates: 40°4′19″N 105°21′14″W

Links
- Public license information: Public file; LMS
- Webcast: Listen live
- Website: 947fmtheword.com

KRKS-FM (94.7 FM) is a commercial radio station licensed to Lafayette, Colorado, United States, and serving the Denver-Boulder market and the Denver metropolitan area. Owned by the Salem Media Group, it airs a Christian format with studios on South Vaughn Way in Aurora and transmitter sited on Lee Hill, northwest of Boulder. KRKS-FM is co-owned KRKS; together, they are known as "The Word." While both KRKS stations broadcast a Christian Talk/Teaching format, they program each station differently.

== History ==
On March 15, 1971, the station signed on as KBVL, originally licensed to Boulder and owned by the Boulder Radio Company. KBVL was the FM counterpart to AM 1490 KBOL (now KCFC). At first, KBVL broadcast an easy listening/middle of the road format but later switched to classical music.

In 1986, the station was acquired by Sterling Radio and a classic rock format began along with the new calls letters KHIH or "K-High 94.7." On April 14, 1988, Adams Communications assumed control of KHIH from Sterling Radio, flipping the station to a Smooth Jazz/New Adult Contemporary format but keeping the KHIH calls and K-High branding (although they were dayparting Smooth Jazz/NAC programing in the evenings and overnights prior to the change of format). The station used the syndicated "Wave" format that had been successful on KTWV-Los Angeles.

CLG Media of Denver purchased KHIH in 1993. A few months later, Salem Communications (later known as the Salem Media Group) purchased KHIH from CLG for $5 million, with the sale closing that December. Salem mostly operates Christian stations, so it dropped the Smooth Jazz format on October 25, 1993, for its current Christian Talk/Teaching format (the smooth jazz format would move to KHOW-FM and pick up the KHIH calls).

In the early 2010s, the station switched its city of license from Boulder to Lafayette, putting it a bit closer to Denver, although the transmitter remains northwest of Boulder, where it had been. The station was rebranded as "94.7 FM The Word" in January 2017.
