= KXJJ =

- Loveland, Colorado; United States
- Broadcast area: Fort Collins / Greeley, Colorado
- Frequency: 1570 kHz
- Branding: La Jota Mexicana

Programming
- Format: Regional Mexican

Ownership
- Owner: Kris Roberts; (Spanish Media Consulting Corporation)

History
- First air date: June 10, 1955
- Former call signs: KLOV (1955–1998); KHPN (1998–2002); KSXT (2002–2008); KPIO (2008–2015); KKCL (2015–2016); KBUD (2016); KVAM (2016–2021)

Technical information
- Licensing authority: FCC
- Facility ID: 35517
- Class: D
- Power: 1,000 watts (day); 40 watts (night)
- Transmitter coordinates: 40°29′36″N 105°10′55″W
- Translators: 101.3; K267CD; Loveland

Links
- Public license information: Public file; LMS
- Website: lajotamexicana.com

KXJJ (1570 AM) is a radio station broadcasting a Regional Mexican format. Licensed to Loveland, Colorado, it serves the Fort Collins / Greeley area. The station is currently owned by Kris Roberts, through licensee Spanish Media Consulting Corporation. KXJJ's transmitter is sited on Milner Mountain in Masonville.

== History ==
The station's previous logo from 2002-2008 showing its then sports format.

On August 3, 1998, the station changed its call sign from KLOV to KHPN. On November 27, 2002, the station changed its call sign from KHPN to KSXT.

In August 2007, the station switched to a sports-talk format after signing an agreement with Mile High Sports.

On September 23, 2008, after being off the air for more than a month, KSXT began broadcasting programming from Eternal Word Television Network's Catholic Radio Network.

On October 8, 2008, the station's call sign was changed from KSXT to KPIO.

In November 2011, the station was fined $4,000 by the FCC for repeated violations. Catholic Radio Network spokesman Jim McLaughlin reported to the Loveland Reporter-Herald that the problem was caused by faulty monitoring equipment at an unattended station. It was reported that the station was broadcasting well over the required amount of power at night, according to the FCC nearly 15 times what the station is licensed for. The station submitted an appeal, which was rejected by the FCC on June 10, 2015. By then, the Catholic Radio Network sold KPIO to another broadcasting group, Loveland Radio Partners, LLC.

On July 1, 2015, the station's call sign was changed from KPIO to KKCL. The station is unrelated to KKCL-FM in Lorenzo, Texas, an oldies-formatted station owned by Townsquare Media.

Effective December 4, 2015, Loveland Radio Partners sold KKCL to Victor Michael, Jr.'s Kona Coast Radio, LLC for $80,000. The station changed its call sign to KBUD on January 13, 2016, and then to KVAM on April 11, 2016.

In 2018, Spanish Media Consulting purchased KVAM and is currently broadcasting in Spanish with a Regional Mexican format. The call letters changed to KXJJ on March 29, 2021.
