= KAZY =

- Cheyenne, Wyoming; United States
- Broadcast area: Cheyenne, Wyoming
- Frequency: 93.7 MHz
- Branding: 93.7 KAZY

Programming
- Format: Active rock

Ownership
- Owner: Freisland Broadcasting Corporation
- Sister stations: KRRR

History
- First air date: 2006 (as KZDR)
- Former call signs: KSHF (2005–2006); KZDR (2006–2008); KMJY (2008)

Technical information
- Licensing authority: FCC
- Facility ID: 162407
- Class: C3
- ERP: 25,000 watts
- HAAT: 35 meters
- Transmitter coordinates: 41°8′4″N 104°41′32″W

Links
- Public license information: Public file; LMS
- Webcast: Listen Live
- Website: 937kazy.com

KAZY (93.7 FM, 93.7 KAZY) is an active rock formatted broadcast radio station licensed to Cheyenne, Wyoming, serving Southeastern Wyoming. KAZY is owned and operated by Freisland Broadcasting Corporation.

Freisland Broadcasting Corporation is affiliated with several other broadcasting entities, including Oregon Trail Broadcasting, LLC, and Jackson Radio Group, Inc., which collectively hold licenses for stations across Wyoming (including Warren AFB), Idaho, and other states.

According to Nielsen Audio ratings for the Cheyenne market, KAZY typically registers a share in the lower range compared to the dominant Country and Classic Hits stations, reflecting its niche Rock format.

== History ==
The station was assigned the call letters KSHF on August 24, 2005. On March 6, 2006, the station changed its callsign to KZDR, on March 5, 2008, to KMJY and September 23, 2008, to the current KAZY.

The call letters KAZY were previously assigned to a powerful Denver, Colorado rock station operating on 106.7 FM from 1977 to 1994. That Denver station operated a popular mainstream rock format before changing to its current identity in the mid-1990s.

In 2018, KAZY partnered with the newly opened Planet Fitness location in Cheyenne to host an all-day grand opening party. The event included an onsite live broadcast, prize giveaways, and featured the station's personality presence.
