= WRNM =

- Ellsworth, Maine; United States
- Frequency: 91.7 MHz
- Branding: God's Country

Programming
- Format: Southern gospel

Ownership
- Owner: Light of Life Ministries
- Sister stations: WWWA, WMDR-FM, WMDR, WRPB, WMEY, WWLN

History
- First air date: March 2012

Technical information
- Licensing authority: FCC
- Facility ID: 174242
- Class: B1
- ERP: 12,500 watts
- HAAT: 69 meters (226 ft)
- Transmitter coordinates: 44°31′4″N 68°24′9″W

Links
- Public license information: Public file; LMS
- Webcast: Listen live
- Website: worshipradionetwork.org

WRNM (91.7 FM) is a radio station licensed to Ellsworth, Maine, United States. The station is owned by Light of Life Ministries. In March 2012 the station signed on simulcasting Augusta based WMDR-FM. In June 2019, they completed a station upgrade, increasing height, power, and station class at the same location. This upgrade changed their antenna from omnidirectional to a directional antenna that minimizes power towards WMEB-FM.
