= WMDR =

WMDR may refer to:

- WMDR (AM), a radio station (1340 AM) licensed to Augusta, Maine, United States
- WMDR-FM, a radio station (88.9 FM) licensed to Oakland, Maine, United States
- WXLP, a radio station (96.9 FM) licensed to Moline, Illinois, United States, which held the WMDR call sign from 1970 to 1975
