= God's Country Radio Network =

American radio network

- Type: Radio network
- Country: United States
- Branding: "God's Country Radio Network"

Programming
- Format: Southern gospel and Christian country

History
- Launch date: 2008
- Closed: November 2010

Coverage
- Availability: Nationwide

Links
- Website: Official Website

God's Country Radio Network was a Religious broadcasting radio network in the United States which launched in 2008. The majority of stations that the network aired on were owned by the non-profit organization Educational Media Foundation, though it also aired on some independent stations. God's Country Radio Network played a blend of Southern Gospel and Positive Country music.

In November 2010, God's Country Radio Network left the air because it "didn't connect with enough listeners to sustain the expenses of the broadcast". It relaunched in January 2011 as a web-based only broadcaster, which has since shut down also.

There is an unrelated "God's Country" network of stations in Maine, WMDR-FM and WWLN, owned by Light of Light Ministries.

== Affiliates at time of closure ==
- KGCD: Lincoln, North Dakota
- KGCE: Post, Texas
- KGCL: Jordan Valley, Oregon
- KGCM: Belgrade, Montana
- KGCN: Roswell, New Mexico
- KGCO: Fort Collins, Colorado
- KQGC: Belen, New Mexico
- WGCN: Nashville, Georgia
- WGCQ: Hayti, Missouri
- WNBV: Grundy, Virginia
- WOKR: Remsen, New York
- WPRN-FM: Lisman, Alabama
