= KKSE =

KKSE may refer to:

- KKSE (AM), a radio station (950 AM) licensed to serve Parker, Colorado, United States
- KKSE-FM, a radio station (92.5 FM) licensed to serve Broomfield, Colorado
