= KEPC =

Radio station in Colorado Springs, Colorado

Simulcasts KVOQ, Denver
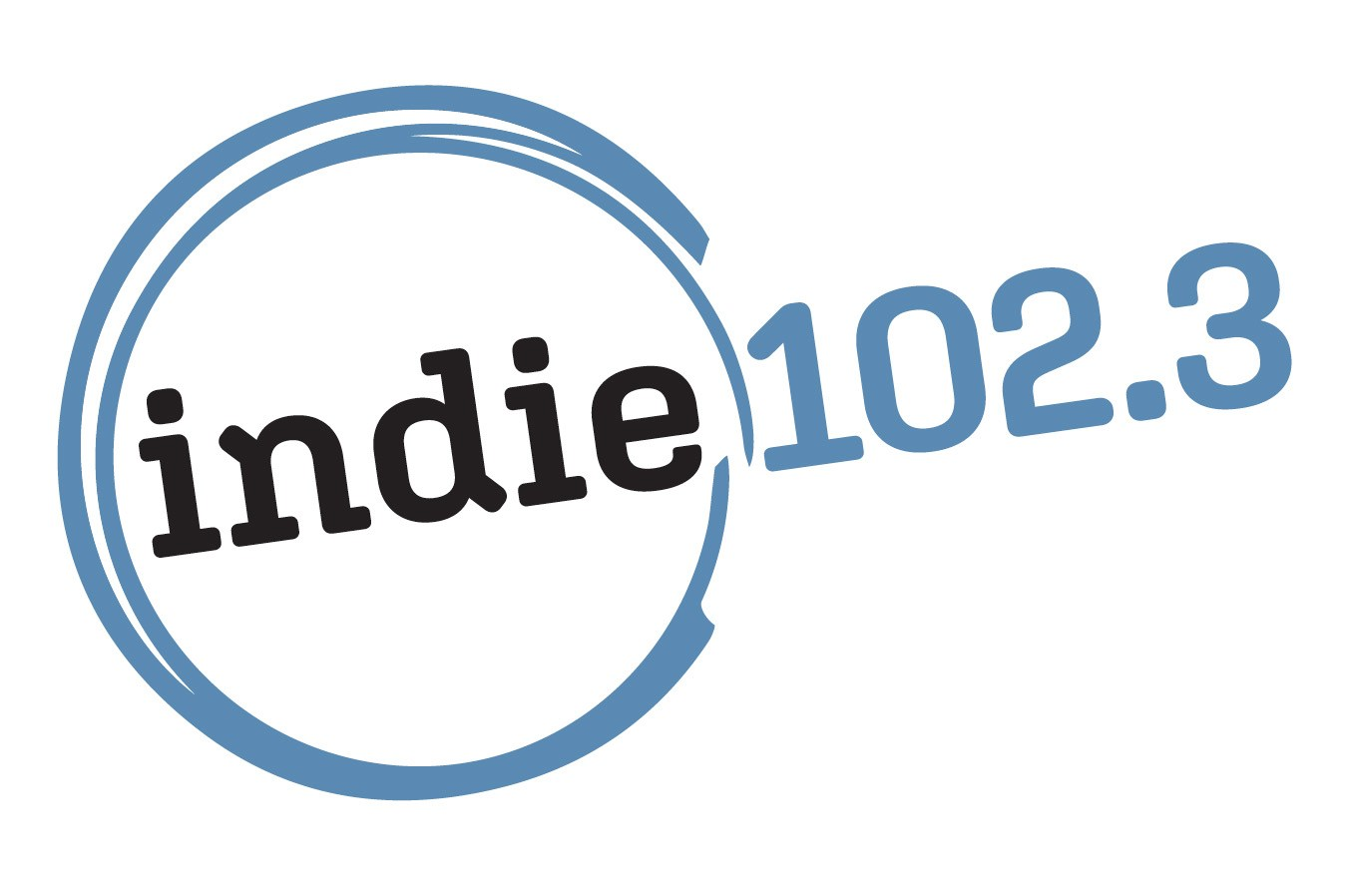
- Colorado Springs, Colorado; United States
- Frequency: 89.7 MHz
- Branding: Indie 102.3

Programming
- Format: Public; Adult Album Alternative

Ownership
- Owner: Pikes Peak State College; (Pikes Peak Community College)
- Operator: Colorado Public Radio
- Sister stations: KVOQ (FM)

History
- Former call signs: KSHS (1957-1972 by station lineage); KTLF (at 89.7 FM)
- Call sign meaning: El Paso Community College (former name of Pikes Peak State College and owner of KEPC)

Technical information
- Licensing authority: FCC
- Facility ID: 52595
- Class: C3
- ERP: 10,000 watts
- HAAT: -77.9 meters
- Repeater: 93.3 K227DI (Pueblo)

Links
- Public license information: Public file; LMS
- Webcast: Listen live
- Website: Indie 102.3

KEPC (89.7 FM) is a radio station licensed to Colorado Springs, Colorado, United States, the station serves the Colorado Springs area, broadcasting a Public Radio Album Adult Alternative format. The station simulcasts KVOQ out of Denver, and is owned by Pikes Peak State College and operated by Colorado Public Radio.

== History ==
The station originally signed on at 90.5 in 1957 as KSHS which was owned by Colorado Springs School District 11 and operated out of the Colorado Springs High School which would soon change its name to Palmer High School after a second high school in the city was completed. The KSHS calls were given in honor of Palmer High's original name. In the early 1970s KSHS was acquired by El Paso Community College which changed its call letters to KEPC which is based on the name of EPCC and/or El Paso County. EPCC would move KEPC first to its then main offices on West Las Vegas in the early 1970s before moving to a building on Bott Ave in the mid-1970s near its then main campus. By 1978, EPCC would move KEPC to its then brand new Centennial Campus south of Colorado Springs neighboring Fort Carson. EPCC would also be renamed Pikes Peak Community College (and in 2022 became Pikes Peak State College). In 1991 KEPC switched frequencies with Christian formatted KTLF and began broadcasting on 89.7 FM. In the late 1990s KEPC would sign on two translators. One in Manitou Springs at 89.1 FM and in Pueblo at 93.1 FM.

In November 2021, it was announced that Pikes Peak Community College would swap frequencies once again. This time with Colorado Public Radio (licensed as Public Broadcasting of Colorado, Inc.). CPR would operate KEPC and its translator in Pueblo, while PPCC would operate KXRE AM 1490 along with its local FM translators at 102.1 FM and 89.1 FM.

== Translator ==
In addition to the main station, KEPC is relayed by a translator in Pueblo to widen its broadcast area.

Call sign	Frequency	City of license	FID	ERP (W)	Class	Transmitter coordinates	FCC info
K227DI	93.3 FM	Pueblo, Colorado	85384	41	D	38°22′21″N 104°33′38″W	LMS
