= KXRE =

Radio station in Manitou Springs, Colorado

- Manitou Springs, Colorado; United States
- Broadcast area: Colorado Springs
- Frequency: 1490 kHz
- Branding: eXtra Music 102.1 & 89.1 FM

Programming
- Format: Variety

Ownership
- Owner: Colorado Public Radio; (Public Broadcasting of Colorado, Inc)
- Operator: Pikes Peak State College

History
- First air date: November 1956
- Former call signs: KCMS (1956–1970); KEDI (1970–1974); KIIQ (1974–1982, 1983-1984); KRTS (1982–1983); KIKX (1984–1987); KRYN (1987–1988)
- Call sign meaning: Originally was a variation of former Christian AC station KKRE AM 1040

Technical information
- Licensing authority: FCC
- Facility ID: 54258
- Class: C
- Power: 500 watts (day); 1,000 watts (night)
- Transmitter coordinates: 38°51′43″N 104°55′32″W
- Translator: See § Translators

Links
- Public license information: Public file; LMS
- Webcast: Listen live
- Website: pikespeak.edu/programs/broadcasting-electronic-media/radio/

KXRE (1490 AM, "eXtra Music 102.1") is a non-commercial radio station licensed to Manitou Springs, Colorado, United States, and serving the Colorado Springs market. The station is currently owned by Colorado Public Radio and operated by Pikes Peak State College. All of the on-air personalities heard are Radio and Television students at the college, as experience at the radio station is a requirement for the Associates of Applied Science in Telecommunications Production degree offered by the school.

KXRE is also heard on two low-power FM translators: 89.1 K206BZ in Colorado Springs and 102.1 K271CK in Manitou Springs.

== History ==
1490 signed on in Manitou Springs in November 1956 as KCMS, the simulcast partner of KCMS-FM 102.7, which had signed on three years earlier.

In early 1970, Edmonds sold KCMS-AM-FM to a group of retired Air Force officers doing business as the Black Forest Development Company. Black Forest took the AM station into an "information and education" format, taking the call letters KEDI. KEDI-KCMS was sold in 1974 and the stations became KIIQ-AM-FM. Wiskes/Abaris Communications acquired KIIQ-AM-FM in October 1979. KIIQ-AM broke away from its FM simulcast by adopting the call letters KRTS and broadcasting an Adult Standards format. In 1983 it returned to its KIIQ-AM calls but with a Tourist Information format.

The station changed its call letters to KIKX on September 15, 1984 to match its then sister station, but still was broadcasting a Tourist Information format. Eventually KIKX-AM would simulcast its FM sister in 1985. In 1987, Wiskes/Abaris sold off KIKX-AM and became a stand alone station as KRYN on September 17, 1987, broadcasting an Adult Standards format. KRYN became KXRE on February 1, 1989, broadcasting an Adult Contemporary Christian format. KXRE was a continuation of crosstown KKRE which was Christian AC from 1986 until 1988. After 1990, KXRE would go through several ownership and format changes (including a period of going dark), but the KXRE calls stayed the same.

In December 2016, Colorado Public Radio agreed to pay then owner Latino Communications $550,000 for KXRE and FM translator K271CK (102.1 FM). KXRE began broadcasting CPR's NPR/news format, originating from KCFR-FM in Denver, in April 2017.

On April 2, 2020, KXRE began simulcasting the AAA format of sister station KVOQ in Denver. With the switch, KVOQ's format now had complete coverage of the Front Range from Fort Collins to Colorado Springs.

Colorado Public Radio and Pikes Peak Community College announced that in early-2022, CPR's "Indie 102.3" format would move to KEPC 89.7 FM and its Pueblo translator at 93.3 FM. KEPC's "Maximum Variety" format will move to KXRE and become "eXtra Music 102.1."

== Translators ==
Broadcast translators for KXRE
Call sign	Frequency	City of license	FID	ERP (W)	Class	Transmitter coordinates	FCC info
K206BZ	89.1 FM	Manitou Springs, Colorado	76218	10	D	38°51′50″N 104°54′49″W	LMS
K271CK	102.1 FM	Manitou Springs, Colorado	142168	99	D	38°51′43″N 104°55′32″W	LMS
