= KWCC =

KWCC may refer to:

- KWCC-FM, a radio station (89.5 FM) licensed to serve Woodland Park, Colorado, United States
- KWCC-LD, a low-power television station (channel 47) licensed to serve Wenatchee, Washington, United States
- KMCS, a radio station (93.1 FM) licensed to serve Muscatine, Iowa, United States, which held the call sign KWCC from 1995 to 2005
