= KBNO (AM) =

Regional Mexican radio station in Denver

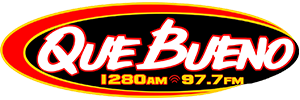
- Denver, Colorado; United States
- Broadcast area: Denver metropolitan area
- Frequency: 1280 kHz
- Branding: Que Bueno 1280AM y 97.7FM

Programming
- Format: Regional Mexican

Ownership
- Owner: Latino Communications, LLC.

History
- First air date: May 16, 1948, as 990 KTLN
- Former call signs: KTLN (1948–1969); KTLK (1969–1981); KBRQ (1981–1987); KXKL(1987–1996); KRRF (1996-4/1999); KEXX (4/1999-5/1999); KXKL (5/1999-6/1999); KVOD (1999–2001)
- Call sign meaning: The station name Que Bueno (How Good)

Technical information
- Licensing authority: FCC
- Facility ID: 59956
- Class: B
- Power: 5,000 watts
- Transmitter coordinates: 39°36′5″N 104°58′48″W
- Translator: 97.7 K249EX (Denver)

Links
- Public license information: Public file; LMS
- Webcast: Listen Live
- Website: KBNO Website

KBNO (1280 AM) is a radio station broadcasting a Regional Mexican radio format. Licensed to Denver, Colorado, it serves the Denver metropolitan area. The station is currently owned by Latino Communications, LLC. It uses the moniker "Que Bueno" (How Good).

Programming is also heard in Denver and its adjacent communities on FM translator station 97.7 K249EX.

== History ==
On May 16, 1948, the station signed on the air as KTLN on 990 kHz. It was owned by Alfred M. Landon, former governor of Kansas and one-time Republican presidential candidate. It moved to 1150 kHz in 1951. It moved to its current 1280 frequency in 1954.

On July 1, 1969, the call letters were changed to KTLK for "K-Talk." KTLK began with a mix of youth oriented telephone talk and top 40 music, eventually dropping the talk to take on top-rated top 40 station KIMN. KTLK evolved to a disco format in the late 1970s before changing to country KBRQ ("K-Bar-Q") in 1981.

The station joined in a long-term simulcast with then-sister station KBRQ (including its flip to oldies in 1987), which would last until August 1, 1996. At that time, AM 1280 flipped to a talk radio format as "Ralph 1280" (which would later be renamed "1280 The X"). On March 21, 1999, the station returned to a simulcast with now-KXKL. Two months later, 1280 became the third home of Denver's heritage classical station KVOD.

In September 2000, Latino Communications, owned by Zee Ferrufino, bought KVOD from Clear Channel for a reported $3.3 million. Ferrufino announced plans to rename the station to KBNO (which was formerly on 1220 AM), and said that he planned to rehire numerous former KBNO personalities to play what he called "Mexican regional music," among other styles. The following month, Colorado Public Radio acquired the KVOD intellectual properties, call letters and music library (the deal would be completed in March 2001). KVOD would cease independent operations after 43 years on December 15, 2000. CPR then moved the classical format to 90.1 FM.
