= WWWA =

WWWA may refer to:

- World Welfare Works Association, a fictional organization in the book and anime series Dirty Pair
- World Wide Wrestling Alliance, a defunct American professional wrestling organization
- World Women's Wrestling Association, a part of All Japan Women's Pro-Wrestling
- WWWA (FM), a radio station (95.3 FM) licensed to Winslow, Maine, United States
