= KTLN =

KTLN may refer to:

- KTLN-TV, a television station (PSIP channel 68/RF channel 22) licensed to Palo Alto, California, United States
- KTLN (FM), a radio station (90.5 FM) licensed to Thibodaux, Louisiana, United States
- KBNO (AM), a radio station (1280 AM) licensed to serve Denver, Colorado, United States, which formerly held the call sign KTLN
