= WHSL =

Currently silent
- Lisman, Alabama; United States
- Broadcast area: Lisman/Butler, Alabama/Meridian, Mississippi
- Frequency: 107.7 MHz
- Branding: Hot 107.7

Programming
- Format: Urban AC

Ownership
- Owner: Augustus Foundation Inc.

History
- First air date: 1997 (as WPRN-FM)
- Former call signs: WPRN-FM (1997–2012)
- Call sign meaning: WHiStLe (previous format)

Technical information
- Licensing authority: FCC
- Facility ID: 82197
- Class: A
- ERP: 6,000 watts
- HAAT: 100 meters (328 feet)
- Transmitter coordinates: 32°05′27″N 88°13′57″W

Links
- Public license information: Public file; LMS

WHSL (107.7 FM, "Hot 107.7") is a radio station licensed to Lisman, Alabama, and serving the Butler radio market. Owned by Augustus Foundation, Inc., WHSL has a transmitter at its studios on Pushmataha Road in Butler.

When on the air, WHSL broadcasts an urban adult contemporary music format to the greater Meridian, Mississippi area. It is the only locally programmed radio station in the area.

== History ==
K. Darryl Jackson received the original construction permit for a new FM station from the Federal Communications Commission (FCC) on March 5, 1997. The new station was assigned the call letters WPRN-FM by the FCC on June 9, 1997. WPRN-FM received its license to cover from the FCC on January 9, 2003.

In August 1999, K. Darryl Jackson applied to the FCC to transfer the broadcast license for WPRN-FM to Butler Broadcasting Corporation. The deal was approved by the FCC on November 5, 1999, and the transaction was consummated on November 30, 1999. Butler Broadcasting Corporation is 100%-owned by Darryl Jackson. WPRN previously broadcast the Christian-oriented God's Country Radio Network as "God's Country 107" prior to the network's closure in November 2010. On February 27, 2012, the station changed its call sign to WHSL.

The station was donated to Joshua Coyle's Leap of Faith, LLC effective August 3, 2012.

On an unknown date, the station went silent.

WHSL returned to the air as of June 3, 2014. Effective December 15, 2014, Leap of Faith sold WHSL to WHSL, LLC, at a purchase price of $10,000.

In the spring of 2017, WHSL changed their format from country to urban adult contemporary, branded as "Hot 107.7".

Effective July 2, 2019, WHSL, LLC donated the station's license to Augustus Foundation Inc. in a transaction valued at $42,000.

On February 12, 2024, WHSL went silent due to lightning damage at its transmitter tower.

== Former on-air staff ==
Myrtle Todd, grandmother of country music recording artist Ty Herndon, hosted a radio show on WPRN-FM and the now-defunct AM sister station WPRN (1330 AM, Butler, Alabama) for more than 40 years. She played mostly Gospel music and discussed community events. Herndon's mother, Peggy, also once hosted a show along with his aunts Lilly and Benny as "The Todd Sisters". Herndon was born in Meridian, Mississippi, but grew just across the state line in Butler, Alabama, where the AM station was licensed. The AM sister station's license was officially cancelled by the Federal Communications Commission on October 6, 2003. The FM station, established in 1997, carried Myrtle Todd's show through at least late-2006.
