= KLHV =

KLHV may refer to:

- KLHV (FM), a radio station (88.5 FM) licensed to serve Cotton Valley, Louisiana, United States
- KVXO, a radio station (88.3 FM) licensed to serve Fort Collins, Colorado, United States, which held the call sign KLHV from 2003 to 2008 and 2008 to 2009
- William T. Piper Memorial Airport (ICAO code KLHV)
