= Eden Lane =

American journalist

Eden Lane is an American journalist considered to be the first openly transgender person in mainstream television broadcasting in the United States. She is an arts and culture reporter for Colorado Public Radio.

== Early life and education ==
Lane grew up in southeast Michigan as Scott Burdick and performed in drag under the name Heather Lane. After moving to New York for college, she worked in theater and dance.

== Career ==
From the early 2000s, Lane anchored, hosted, and produced shows that aired on PBS12: the LGBTQ news magazine series Colorado OUTSpoken from 2007 to 2011 and the Colorado arts and culture interview program In Focus with Eden Lane, which aired from 2009 to 2018. In 2008, she became the first openly transgender journalist to cover a major political event for PBS (the Democratic National Convention).

In 2017, Lane returned to theater in the role of Sandra in the American Repertory Theater's production of Trans Scripts, Part I: The Women.

After anchoring NewsNet Midday Edition and reading morning and midday headlines for Scripps National OTT between 2020 and 2022, Lane joined Colorado Public Radio as an arts and culture reporter.

== Personal life ==
Lane is married and has one daughter.

== Awards and honors ==
- 2011: Ovation Award, Denver Post, Special Achievement
- 2015: Best Non-Network TV Personality, Westword
- 2023: Regional Edward R. Murrow Award, Excellence in Sound, Region 3, Radio - Large Market
