= KNDH =

Simulcasts KVOQ, Greenwood Village
- Carbondale, Colorado; United States
- Broadcast area: Glenwood Springs, Colorado
- Frequency: 96.7 MHz (HD Radio)
- Branding: Indie 102.3

Programming
- Format: Adult album alternative

Ownership
- Owner: Colorado Public Radio; (Public Broadcasting of Colorado, Inc.)

History
- Former call signs: KUUR (2005–2021)
- Call sign meaning: Reference to "Indie"

Technical information
- Licensing authority: FCC
- Facility ID: 162283
- Class: A
- ERP: 90 watts
- HAAT: 764.3 meters (2,508 ft)
- Transmitter coordinates: 39°25′8″N 107°22′10″W
- Translator: See § Translators

Links
- Public license information: Public file; LMS
- Webcast: Listen live
- Website: www.cpr.org/indie/

KNDH is an American FM radio station licensed by the Federal Communications Commission (FCC) to broadcast on 96.7 MHz serving Carbondale, Colorado.

== History ==
KNDH debuted as KUUR "Your Radio", serving the Aspen area with its translators including 101.1 (Aspen, Snowmass) and 107.7 (Glenwood Springs). Your Radio described its programming format as cool contemporary music. The station was founded by Marcos A. Rodriguez and owned by his Colorado Radio Marketing, LLC. Licensed to Carbondale, Colorado, the station was the first radio station in that area with the ability to do digital broadcasting. KUUR became the first American radio station to broadcast its programs in Bethlehem when, in December 2012, it was involved in a special arrangement with Radio Mawwal 101.7 FM there, which saw the broadcast of a section of KUUR's Christmas programming on that station throughout the Christmas season.

Effective July 22, 2021, Colorado Radio Marketing traded KUUR and its dependent translators to Colorado Public Radio in 2021 for KKPC (1230 AM) in Pueblo, which the network no longer needed. "Your Radio" was replaced with a simulcast of "Indie 102.3" KVOQ on May 26, and the call sign was changed to KNDH on May 27.

== Translators ==
In addition to the main station, KNDH is relayed by several translators to widen its broadcast area.

| Call sign | Frequency | City of license | FID | FCC info |
|---|---|---|---|---|
| K266AK | 101.1 FM | Aspen, Colorado | 154289 | LMS |
| K226BW | 93.1 FM | Basalt, Colorado | 138297 | LMS |
| K282BJ | 104.3 FM | Carbondale, Colorado | 138156 | LMS |
| K230AZ | 93.9 FM | Glenwood Springs, Colorado | 53154 | LMS |
| K242BL | 96.3 FM | Glenwood Springs, Colorado | 151455 | LMS |
| K299AC | 107.7 FM | Glenwood Springs, Colorado | 12346 | LMS |
| K275AR | 102.9 FM | New Castle, Colorado | 147539 | LMS |
| K254BQ | 98.7 FM | Redstone, Colorado | 52724 | LMS |

== See also ==
- KSNO
- TV Aspen
