= KRLJ =

KRLJ may refer to:

- KRLJ-LD, a low-power television station (channel 24, virtual 45) licensed to serve Joplin, Missouri, United States
- KECC, a radio station (89.1 FM) licensed to serve La Junta, Colorado, United States, which held the call sign KRLJ from 1999 to 2008
