= KDCO (AM) =

- Denver, Colorado; United States
- Broadcast area: Denver metropolitan area
- Frequency: 1340 kHz

Programming
- Language: Spanish
- Format: Catholic radio
- Network: ESNE Radio

Ownership
- Owner: El Sembrador Ministries

History
- First air date: 1940 (as KMYR)
- Former call signs: KMYR (1940–1956); KDEN (1956–1993); KKYD (1993–2001); KCFR (2001–2011); KVOQ (2011–2015)
- Call sign meaning: Denver, Colorado

Technical information
- Licensing authority: FCC
- Facility ID: 34585
- Class: C
- Power: 1,000 watts
- Transmitter coordinates: 39°41′00″N 105°00′24″W

Links
- Public license information: Public file; LMS

KDCO (1340 kHz) is a noncommercial AM radio station licensed to Denver, Colorado. The station is owned by El Sembrador Ministries and carries its ESNE Radio network, featuring Spanish-language Catholic radio programming.

== History ==
=== KMYR and KDEN ===
The station was launched by Frederick W. Meyer, a wholesale grocer, in 1940 as KMYR. (The call sign represented Meyer's name.) It originally signed on with 250 watts of power. The station's sale in 1956 brought a call letter change to KDEN.

For a time in the 1970s and 1980s, KDEN aired an all-news radio format. At first it used NBC Radio's "News and Information Service" (NIS). When that was discontinued, KDEN remained an NBC News network affiliate but it had its own schedule of local anchors delivering the news.

=== Radio AAHS ===
In December 1993, after an eight-month period off the air, 1340 AM became KKYD "Radio AAHS", the Denver outlet of the first nationwide network of radio programs for children. The downfall of Radio AAHS came when the Walt Disney Company established a competitor, Radio Disney.

After the sign-off of Radio AAHS in January 1998, Children's Broadcasting Corporation (CBC) needed programming for its owned and operated former AAHS stations until it could find buyers for them. KKYD, along with the other nine CBC stations, became an outlet for "Beat Radio", which broadcast electronic dance music 12 hours a night.

=== Colorado Public Radio ===
This lasted until late October 1998. KKYD then switched to a Catholic radio format, which it aired until sale from the Catholic Radio Network to Colorado Public Radio (CPR). The announcement of CPR's purchase February 9, 2001, also mentioned plans to convert the station from commercial to non-commercial status.

In September 2000, CPR acquired the intellectual properties of then-classical station KVOD (1280 AM), as that station was switching to another format. In March 2001, Colorado Public Radio put the classical music programming of KVOD on 90.1 FM, with KCFR's news/talk programming from NPR moved to 1340 AM. On July 9, 2008, KCFR moved back to 90.1 FM, with KVOD moving to the newly acquired 88.1 FM frequency. The changes were made as CPR wanted to go FM-only by the end of the year. Until a buyer could be found for 1340, CPR continued to operate it as a simulcast of KCFR-FM.

On October 31, 2011, CPR launched "OpenAir" on 1340 AM, billing it "New Music from Colorado Public Radio". It has a broad-based format that focuses on current independent artists with a great deal of current Colorado talent. OpenAir also streams online at www.openaircpr.org. With the change, new KVOQ call letters were adopted.

=== Sports radio ===
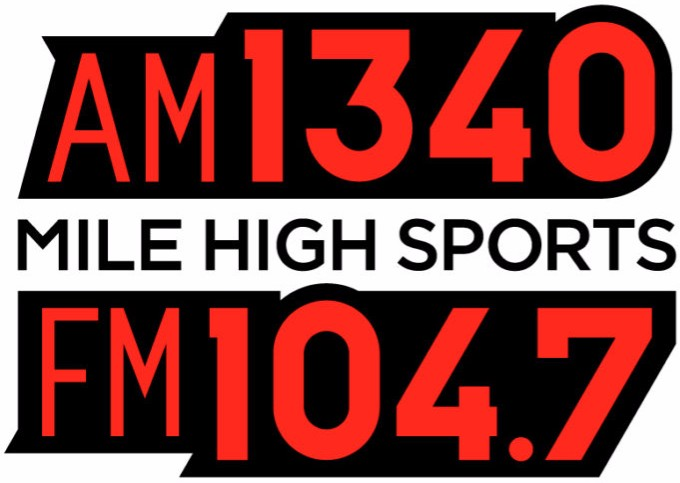
Logo as "Mile High Sports"

On July 24, 2015, Colorado Public Radio announced that it would swap KVOQ to Victor Michael's Cedar Cove Broadcasting, Inc. in exchange for KRKY-FM. Michael also forgave $100,000 in debt as part of the swap. On July 27, 2015, KVOQ changed its format to all-sports, branded as "Mile High Sports". The previous OpenAir format moved to KVOQ (102.3 FM).

On August 28, 2015, the station changed its call sign to KDCO. Effective January 20, 2016, Cedar Cove Broadcasting traded KDCO to Kona Coast Radio, LLC, in exchange for translator stations K214DW and K206EO. Kona Coast Radio is also owned by Victor Michael.

On April 28, 2016, KDCO began simulcasting on FM translator K284CI (104.7 FM).

Effective August 22, 2017, Victor Michael sold KDCO and translators K225BS and K284CI to 4-K's LLLP for $464,000.

Effective November 25, 2020, 4-K's LLLP sold the K284CI translator to Rocky Mountain Public Media for $680,000, at which point it began rebroadcasting KUVO. The AM station was simultaneously sold separately for $420,000 to El Sembrador Ministries, owner of the ESNE Radio network of Spanish-language Catholic radio stations with ESNE programming beginning on December 8.
