= WWLN =

- Lincoln, Maine; United States
- Frequency: 91.5 MHz
- Branding: God's Country

Programming
- Format: Southern Gospel

Ownership
- Owner: Light of Life Ministries
- Sister stations: WMDR, WMDR-FM, WRPB, WWWA

History
- First air date: November 29, 2010
- Former frequencies: 90.5 MHz (2010–2023)

Technical information
- Licensing authority: FCC
- Facility ID: 174228
- Class: A
- ERP: 2,400 watts
- HAAT: 147.0 meters (482.3 ft)
- Transmitter coordinates: 45°20′41″N 68°30′30″W

Links
- Public license information: Public file; LMS
- Webcast: Listen Online
- Website: http://www.godscountry.lightoflife.info/

WWLN (91.5 FM) is a radio station licensed to Lincoln, Maine, United States. The station is owned by Light of Life Ministries and simulcasts Oakland, Maine, based WMDR-FM as God's Country. It uses the same logo as WMDR-FM.
