= KFDN =

KFDN may refer to:

- KVVC-LP, a low-power radio station (106.5 FM) licensed to serve Vallejo, California, United States, which held the call sign KFDN-LP from 2015 to 2018
- KVOD, a radio station (88.1 FM) licensed to serve Lakewood, Colorado, United States, which held the call sign KFDN from 2002 to 2008
