= KGCO =

KGCO may refer to:

- KGCO-LP, a low-power radio station (107.9 FM) licensed to serve Crete, Nebraska, United States
- KVXO, a radio station (88.3 FM) licensed to serve Fort Collins, Colorado, United States, which held the call sign KGCO in 2008 and from 2014 to 2015
