= KVOQ (FM) =

Radio station in Greenwood Village–Denver, Colorado

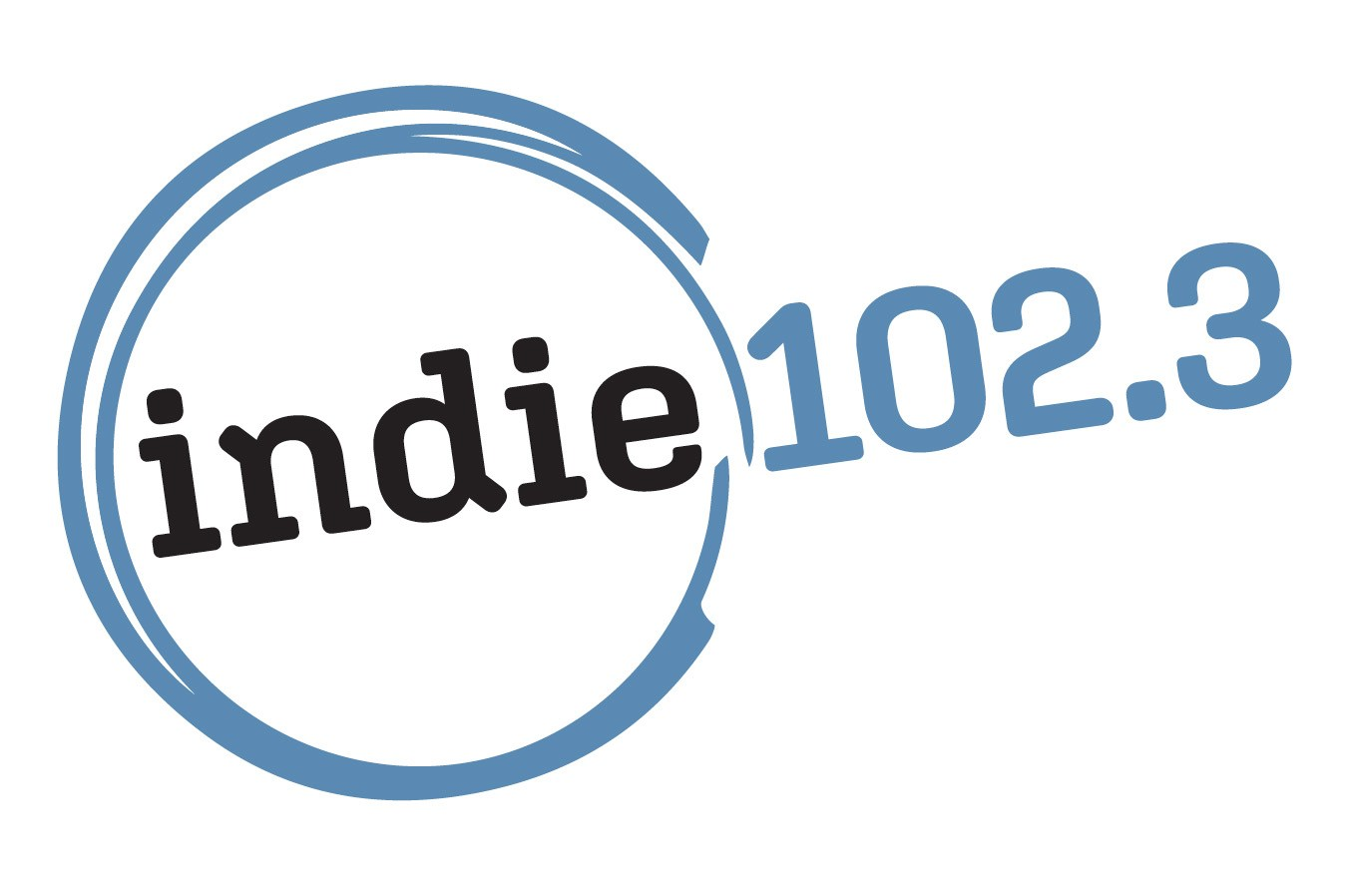
- Greenwood Village, Colorado; United States
- Broadcast area: Denver, Colorado
- Frequency: 102.3 MHz
- Branding: Indie 102.3

Programming
- Language: English
- Format: Adult album alternative (AAA) (Public)
- Affiliations: NPR

Ownership
- Owner: Colorado Public Radio; (Public Broadcasting of Colorado, Inc.)
- Sister stations: KEPC

History
- First air date: 1996 (as KAGM)
- Former call signs: KAGM (1992–2005); KJEB (3/2005-11/2005); KCUV-FM (2005–2006); KCUV (2006–2010); KDSP (2010–2015)

Technical information
- Licensing authority: FCC
- Facility ID: 37028
- Class: A
- ERP: 1,000 watts
- HAAT: 238 meters (781 ft)
- Transmitter coordinates: 39°43′59″N 105°14′10″W
- Translator: 90.9 K215FM (Fort Collins)
- Repeaters: 102.3 KVOQ-FM3 (Boulder); 89.7 KEPC (Colorado Springs); 88.5 KVQI (Vail); 96.7 KNDH (Carbondale)

Links
- Public license information: Public file; LMS
- Webcast: Listen live
- Website: www.cpr.org/indie/

KVOQ (102.3 FM) is a public radio station licensed to Greenwood Village, Colorado, and serving the Denver metropolitan area. KVOQ broadcasts an adult album alternative (AAA) radio format known as "Indie 102.3" under the ownership of Colorado Public Radio. It is listener supported and airs no commercials. On-air fundraisers are conducted several times each year.

A 40-watt booster station, 102.3 KVOQ-FM3, is on the air in Boulder to help listeners there better receive the station. It is also simulcast on KNDH (96.7 FM) in Carbondale and its four dependent translators, which CPR acquired in 2021. In January 2022, Indie 102.3 began to simulcast in Colorado Springs on KEPC (89.7 FM).

== Station history ==
=== KCUV (2005-2008) ===
KCUV (as the station was previously known) originally began on 1510 AM, and moved to the 102.3 FM signal in 2005. It replaced the former KAGM (licensed to Strasburg, Colorado) that aired a country music format for many years. The station's city of license was moved to the Denver suburb of Greenwood Village.

KCUV featured a large and diverse playlist, including a mix of rhythm and blues, classic rock, folk music, alternative rock, modern rock, soul music and blues. The station's lineup included "KCUV's Live From Ebbets Field", a concert show featuring live, intimate performances from the best bands performing at Chuck Morris' Ebbets Field concert club in downtown Denver. KCUV also periodically had CD releases of "Live From Ebbets Field" performances in cooperation with Chuck Morris and Listen Up, with proceeds going to the Morgan Adams Foundation.

=== Adult hits (2008–2010) ===
On September 1, 2008, at 12:00 a.m., KCUV ended broadcasting and became a simulcast of sister station KJAC (licensed to Timnath), which aired the Jack FM-branded adult hits format. It was the first U.S. station to use the Jack-FM moniker and format, which had been a big success on several stations in Canada. The simulcast gave KJAC better coverage in the Denver area.

=== Sports (2010–2015) ===
In May 2010, the station was sold to Front Range Sports Network, LLC.

In the summer of 2010, after KCUV and KJAC were purchased by Moreland Properties, LLC, from NRC Broadcasting, KCUV dropped the Jack FM simulcast and began stunting. The Denver Post reported on July 15, 2010, that KCUV would be adopting an all-sports format under the new call sign of KDSP, which would make it the fourth sports station in the Denver market.

The format was scheduled to launch on July 26, 2010. Hosts on the proposed station included longtime KCNC and KEPN personalities Vic Lombardi and Gary Miller in an expected 7-9 AM weekday slot.

Instead, on July 26, 2010, the Denver Post reported that the sports format originally set to be heard on KDSP would make a last-minute switch to another Denver station at 87.7 FM. The following day, July 27, 2010, KDSP changed to a Spanish-language sports format using the ESPN Deportes Radio Network.

On March 31, 2011, KXDP-LP and KDSP switched formats and branding, with KXDP-LP becoming the ESPN Deportes affiliate and KDSP becoming 102.3 The Ticket. On January 1, 2012, KDSP became an ESPN Radio affiliate.

=== Adult alternative (2015–present) ===
On January 5, 2015, Colorado Public Radio (CPR) acquired KDSP. On January 27, CPR converted the station to non-commercial status as a simulcast of AM sister station KVOQ's "Open Air" adult album alternative (AAA) format. The purchase was consummated on April 29, 2015, at a price of $5.75 million. Former sister station KJAC continued airing the ESPN Radio format until December of that year, when that station was sold to Community Radio for Northern Colorado and flipped it to a non-commercial AAA format.

CPR maintains three audio services on the air in the Denver area: KVOQ airs adult album alternative music, while KCFR-FM is a news and information station affiliated with NPR, and KVOD broadcasts classical music.

On July 1, 2019, KVOQ relaunched as "Indie 102.3".

On April 2, 2020, KVOQ began simulcasting on sister station 1490 AM/98.5/102.1 FM KXRE in Colorado Springs which now gives KVOQ's format complete coverage of the eastern side of the Rocky Mountains from north of Fort Collins in the north to south of Colorado Springs in the south.

In June 2020, KVOQ began simulcasting on newly-acquired sister station 88.5 FM KVQI in Vail. The station was previously owned by Rocky Mountain Public Media as KVJZ simulcasting KUVO.
