= KCFC =

Colorado Public Radio station in Boulder, Colorado

- Boulder, Colorado; United States
- Broadcast area: Boulder-Longmont
- Frequency: 1490 kHz
- Branding: CPR News

Programming
- Format: Public radio
- Network: Colorado Public Radio
- Affiliations: NPR

Ownership
- Owner: Colorado Public Radio; (Public Broadcasting of Colorado, Inc.)

History
- First air date: February 15, 1947
- Former call signs: KBOL (1947–1994); KBKS (1994–1995); KBVI (1995–1999); KWAB (1999–2001)

Technical information
- Licensing authority: FCC
- Facility ID: 70405
- Class: C
- Power: 290 watts
- Transmitter coordinates: 39°57′53″N 105°14′7″W
- Translator: 106.3 K292GW (Boulder)

Links
- Public license information: Public file; LMS
- Webcast: Listen live
- Website: cpr.org

KCFC (1490 AM) is a radio station licensed to Boulder, Colorado. The station is owned by Colorado Public Radio (CPR), and airs CPR's "Colorado News" network, originating from KCFR-FM in Denver, Colorado.

The station signed on in 1947 as KBOL. Herb Hollister was president, and Russ Shaffer was vice president and general manager. Shaffer acquired majority interest in the station in 1953. Russ Shaffer's son Rusty became general manager in the mid-1970s and would become sole owner by 1985.

In 1999, the station was owned by Working Assets Broadcasting and operated a progressive talk radio format as KWAB, with the slogan "Radio for Change".

== Programming ==
KCFR-FM and KCFC broadcast programming from National Public Radio (including Morning Edition and All Things Considered), American Public Media (including A Prairie Home Companion & its successor, Live From Here), and Public Radio International (including This American Life and The World), as well as an original daily interview show called Colorado Matters.
