= KGCL =

- Jordan Valley, Oregon; United States
- Broadcast area: Boise
- Frequency: 90.9 MHz
- Branding: Radio Nueva Vida

Programming
- Format: Spanish language Christian radio
- Affiliations: Radio Nueva Vida

Ownership
- Owner: Educational Media Foundation; (The Association For Community Education, Inc.)
- Sister stations: KLXI, KARO

History
- Former call signs: KARO (2002–2003); KIDH (2003–2008)

Technical information
- Licensing authority: FCC
- Facility ID: 85777
- Class: C0
- ERP: 21,500 watts
- HAAT: 658.8 meters
- Transmitter coordinates: 43°0′26″N 116°42′23″W
- Translators: K214FG (90.7 MHz, Casa Grande, Arizona)

Links
- Public license information: Public file; LMS
- Website: nuevavida.com

KGCL (90.9 FM) is a radio station broadcasting the Spanish Christian radio network Radio Nueva Vida. Licensed to Jordan Valley, Oregon, United States, the station serves the Boise area. The station is currently owned by Educational Media Foundation.

== History ==
The station was assigned the call letters KARO on 25 June 2002. On 27 March 2003, the station changed its call sign to KIDH, and on 24 September 2008 to the current KGCL.

From 2008 to 2010 KGCL aired a Southern Gospel and Positive Country format, carrying the programming of God's Country Radio Network.
