= KWCC-FM =

- Woodland Park, Colorado; United States
- Frequency: 89.5 MHz

Programming
- Language: English
- Format: Public radio News-talk (days); Eclectic music (evenings)
- Affiliations: National Public Radio, American Public Media, Public Radio Exchange, Rocky Mountain Community Radio, BBC World Service, Colorado Public Radio

Ownership
- Owner: Colorado College; (The Colorado College)
- Operator: Colorado Public Radio (via SSA)
- Sister stations: KRCC, KCCS

History
- Former call signs: KILE-FM (2008–2017)

Technical information
- Licensing authority: FCC
- Facility ID: 176681
- Class: A
- ERP: 100 watts (vertical)
- HAAT: −132 meters (−433 ft)
- Transmitter coordinates: 38°59′49″N 105°2′46″W

Links
- Public license information: Public file; LMS
- Webcast: Listen Live
- Website: krcc.org

KWCC-FM (89.5 FM) is an American non-commercial educational radio station licensed to serve Woodland Park, Colorado. The station's broadcast license is held by 91.5 KRCC, owned by Colorado College.

KWCC-FM repeats the main KRCC signal content found at 91.5 FM.

== History ==
In October 2007, Grace Public Radio applied to the U.S. Federal Communications Commission (FCC) for a construction permit for a new broadcast radio station. The FCC granted this permit on May 7, 2008, with a scheduled expiration date of May 7, 2011. The new station was assigned call sign "KILE-FM" on August 27, 2008. After multiple modifications, construction and testing were completed in April 2011 and the station was granted its broadcast license on May 11, 2011.

As of 2011, KILE-FM broadcast an oldies music format during the day and soft jazz at night.

In May 2017, the station was sold by Grace Public Radio to Colorado College for $24,000 to serve as a repeater of its NPR affiliated station KRCC. The sale was consummated on June 16, 2017, at which point the call letters were changed to KWCC-FM.

== Construction permit ==
On December 26, 2012, KILE-FM applied for an FCC construction permit to change the directional pattern of the antenna and increase HAAT to -132 meters.
