= WSHD =

Radio station at Shead Memorial High School in Eastport, Maine

WSHD, WSHD-LP
- Eastport, Maine; United States
- Broadcast area: Northern and Downeast Maine area
- Frequencies: 91.7 MHz (WSHD); 93.3 MHz (WSHD-LP)
- Branding: Tiger Radio

Programming
- Format: Variety/High school radio

Ownership
- Owner: Shead Memorial High School

History
- First air date: January 1983 (91.7 MHz)
- Call sign meaning: "Shead"

Technical information
- Licensing authority: FCC
- Facility ID: 60040; 196329
- Class: D L1
- ERP: 12 watts 35 watts
- HAAT: 35.0 meters 50 meters
- Transmitter coordinates: 44°54′30″N 66°59′24″W

Links
- Public license information: 196329 LMS

WSHD and WSHD-LP (91.7 and 93.3 FM) are high school radio stations licensed to Shead Memorial High School in Eastport, Maine, United States. The stations serve the areas of Eastport, Lubec, Whiting, Pleasant Point, Perry, Pembroke, and Robbinston. The stations play a very wide variety of music and informational programming. They offer opportunities for students to learn about radio and have their own radio shows. There is also a schedule of live DJ shows hosted by various members of the communities of Eastport and the surrounding area; live DJ programming is only aired on the 93.3 frequency.
