= KJAC =

Radio station in Timnath–Fort Collins, Colorado

- Timnath, Colorado; United States
- Broadcast area: Fort Collins–Greeley, Colorado
- Frequency: 105.5 MHz (HD Radio)
- Branding: 105.5 The Colorado Sound

Programming
- Format: Adult album alternative

Ownership
- Owner: Rocky Mountain Public Media
- Sister stations: KUNC

History
- First air date: 1989
- Former call signs: KLWG (1987–1988, CP); KIMX (1988–2003); KKHI-FM (2003–2004)
- Call sign meaning: Station previously broadcast the Jack FM format

Technical information
- Licensing authority: FCC
- Facility ID: 38345
- Class: C1
- ERP: 50,000 watts
- HAAT: 397 meters (1,302 ft)
- Transmitter coordinates: 40°37′3″N 105°19′39″W
- Translators: 88.9 K205FZ (Steamboat Springs); 94.3 K232AC (Breckenridge)
- Repeater: 105.5 KJAC-FM1 (Boulder)

Links
- Public license information: Public file; LMS
- Webcast: CRNC, LLC
- Website: coloradosound.org

KJAC is a non-commercial public radio station licensed to Timnath, Colorado, United States, broadcasting to the Fort Collins-Greeley area on 105.5 FM. It is owned by Rocky Mountain Public Media and airs an adult album alternative (AAA) format known as 105.5 The Colorado Sound.

This facility began as a commercial radio station, which began broadcasting as KIMX in 1989. Under the ownership of NRC Broadcasting, the station used the Jack FM syndicated adult hits format and rebroadcast it on 102.3 FM in metro Denver. In 2012, KJAC flipped to ESPN Radio. It was acquired by Community Radio for Northern Colorado in 2016 and adopted its present format.

== History ==
=== As a commercial radio station ===
KJAC started as a construction permit with the call letters KLWG, in 1987. The station officially signed on in 1989 with the call sign KIMX. The KIMX call sign was subsequently moved to Wyoming, jumping around on various frequencies. The station changed call signs to KKHI-FM in late 2003 and was acquired from Laramie Mountain Broadcasting by NRC Broadcasting for $15 million.

=== Adult hits (2004–2012) ===
KJAC previously aired an adult hits music format branded as "Jack FM". For a short time, it was simulcast on KJMP (870 AM) in nearby Pierce, Colorado.

Jack FM Denver was the first Jack radio station in the United States. Denver's Jack employed a comedic irreverence in its presentation, and a style of music endemic to the varied tastes of Colorado's front-range listeners. Each Jack station is a little different, and KJAC's attention to the style of Colorado gave the station a unique and local feel.

On September 1, 2008, NRC Broadcasting converted KCUV (102.3 FM) into a simulcast of KJAC, utilizing the 102.3 FM frequency to serve the broader Denver metropolitan area, while 105.5 FM was reoriented to Northern Colorado. Jingles broadcast over the air often interchanged 102.3 FM and 105.5 FM, depending on whether the focus was on Denver, or the station in general.

On July 15, 2010, it was announced that KJAC would stick with Jack FM while 102.3–renamed KDSP–flipped to sports on July 19. In 2011, KJAC dropped its local version of Jack FM and started using the national version from Dial Global normally heard in smaller markets.

=== Sports (2012–2016) ===
On September 7, 2012, KJAC started stunting with classic country as "Bob FM", which led to a flip to ESPN Radio.

=== Adult alternative (2016–present) ===
On December 7, 2015, Front Range Sports Networks sold KJAC to Community Radio for Northern Colorado, who converted the station to a non-commercial adult album alternative format on February 29, 2016, allowing new sister station KUNC to focus on news/talk programming. After KJAC ended its programming on January 3, 2016, ESPN Radio returned to former Denver affiliates KEPN and KKFN starting January 4.

On February 29, 2016, the adult album alternative format was officially launched as "The Colorado Sound". The sale to Community Radio for Northern Colorado was consummated on April 5, 2016, at a price of $3 million. On July 14, 2017, KJAC began simulcasting on translator K232AC 94.3 FM in Breckenridge.

In March 2026, Community Radio for Northern Colorado and Rocky Mountain Public Media (RMPM), the parent organization of Rocky Mountain PBS, announced that they had signed a nonbinding letter of intent to explore a merger, citing the end of federal funding for public broadcasting. Under an asset purchase agreement signed on June 30, 2026, a limited liability company operated by RMPM agreed to acquire CRNC's six full-service FM stations, including KUNC and KJAC, along with 11 FM translators.

The Federal Communications Commission approved the transfer in August 2026, and the transaction was completed on October 1.
