= KVOV =

Coordinates: 39.419°N 107.370°W

- Carbondale, Colorado; United States
- Frequency: 90.5 MHz
- Branding: CPR Classical

Programming
- Format: Public; Classical
- Affiliations: Colorado Public Radio, NPR

Ownership
- Owner: Public Broadcasting Of Colorado

Technical information
- Licensing authority: FCC
- Facility ID: 8764
- Class: C2
- ERP: 450 watts
- HAAT: 775 meters (2,543 ft)

Links
- Public license information: Public file; LMS
- Webcast: OGG Vorbis Stream
- Website: cpr.org

KVOV (90.5 FM) is a radio station licensed to Carbondale, Colorado. The station is owned by Colorado Public Radio (CPR), and airs CPR's "Classical Music" network, originating from KVOD in Denver, Colorado.

== Translators ==
The station's signal is relayed by the following translator stations.

Call sign	Frequency	City of license	FID	ERP (W)	FCC info
K268BJ	101.5 FM	Aspen, Colorado	52725	19	LMS
K261AI	100.1 FM	Glenwood Springs, Colorado	39907	8	LMS
K230AN	93.9 FM	Old Snowmass, Colorado	138071	5	LMS
K229AI	93.7 FM	Thomasville, Colorado	138047	10	LMS
