= KKSE-FM =

Sports radio station in Broomfield–Denver, Colorado

- Broomfield, Colorado; United States
- Broadcast area: Denver metro area; Boulder County; Larimer County; Northern Colorado
- Frequency: 92.5 MHz (HD Radio)
- Branding: Altitude Sports 92.5 FM

Programming
- Language: English
- Format: Sports radio
- Subchannels: HD2: KKSE (AM) simulcast
- Affiliations: Altitude Sports; Fox Sports Radio; Colorado Avalanche; Colorado Mammoth; Colorado Rapids; Denver Nuggets

Ownership
- Owner: Kroenke Sports & Entertainment; (KSE Radio Ventures, LLC)
- Sister stations: KIMN; KKSE; KXKL-FM

History
- First air date: June 19, 1967 (as KGRE at 92.3)
- Former call signs: KGRE (1967–84); KYOU (1984–89); KDHT (1989–1993); KZDG (1993–96); KVOD (1996–99); KDJM (1999–2005); KLWL (2005–06); KWLI (2006–09); KWOF (2009–18)
- Former frequencies: 92.3 MHz (1967–82)
- Call sign meaning: Kroenke Sports & Entertainment

Technical information
- Licensing authority: FCC
- Facility ID: 59972
- Class: C1
- ERP: 57,000 watts
- HAAT: 377 meters (1,237 ft)
- Transmitter coordinates: 40.096°N 104.902°W
- Translator: 101.7 K269AE (Boulder)

Links
- Public license information: Public file; LMS
- Webcast: Listen live
- Website: www.altitudesportsradio.com

KKSE-FM (92.5 MHz) is a commercial radio station licensed to Broomfield, Colorado, and serving the Denver metropolitan area and Northern Colorado. KKSE-FM airs a sports talk format branded as "Altitude Sports 92.5 FM". KKSE-FM has studios on South Colorado Boulevard in Glendale, with its transmitter located off Wheatland Road near Fort Lupton in Weld County. The station is owned by Stan Kroenke through the KSE Radio Ventures subsidiary of Kroenke Sports & Entertainment. Much of its programming is simulcast on KKSE (Altitude Sports 950). Kroenke also sister stations KIMN and KXKL-FM.

== History ==
=== KGRE (1967–1982) ===
On June 19, 1967, the station first signed on as KGRE in Greeley. It originally broadcast on 92.3 MHz, and was the FM counterpart of KYOU (1450 AM, now KGRE). In 1982, it moved to 92.5 FM.

=== KYOU (1984–1989) ===
In 1984, the station switched its call sign to KYOU. It took over the country music format of KYOU AM when that station switched to oldies as KATR.

In 1989, KYOU got a boost in power to 57,000 watts from a taller tower, so it could better cover the Denver radio market, and was relicensed to Broomfield.

=== KDHT (1989–1993) ===
The call sign changed to KDHT on February 17, 1989, and under the programming leadership of Ira Gordon, KDHT became one of the earliest folk/Americana/adult album alternative (AAA) hybrids.

=== KZDG (1993–1996) ===
In February 1993, APB Broadcasting sold KDHT to Premiere Radio Networks for $3.55 million. Premiere changed the format to new country as KZDG, "Big Dog 92.5". Shamrock Broadcasting acquired the station in March 1995, with the station then rebranding as "Z 92.5" shortly thereafter. Chancellor Media purchased the station in early 1996.

=== KVOD (1996–1999) ===
From 1969 to the mid 1990s, Denver had a commercial classical music station at 99.5, KVOD. When Tribune Broadcasting acquired the station in 1995, it did not want to continue the classical format; to appease KVOD's audience, Tribune reached a deal with Chancellor to move KVOD's classical format over to Chancellor's newly acquired 92.5 frequency, and agreed to simulcast for nearly a month until 99.5 debuted a new classic rock format on March 4 as KKHK (now KQMT).

On February 18, 1996, at Midnight, KZDG became the new home of classical music in the Denver market. It took the KVOD call letters on March 22. (Today, KVOD is a non-commercial classical station at 88.1 MHz.)

=== KDJM (1999–2005) ===
On May 21, 1999, at 5 p.m., Chancellor Media moved KVOD's classical format and call letters to 1280 AM. During this time, the rhythmic oldies format had proved to be popular in markets such as Chicago, Fresno, and Los Angeles. With Denver having a large Hispanic population that the format primarily caters to, Chancellor launched the format in Denver as "Jammin 92.5", with new call letters KDJM adopted on June 25, 1999. The new sound of "Denver's Jammin' Oldies" consisted of classic soul music, disco and R&B tunes. Core artists included Michael Jackson, Donna Summer, Prince, Isley Brothers, Barry White, Mary J. Blige, Teena Marie, Earth, Wind & Fire and Chaka Khan. Later in 1999, the station was acquired by AMFM, which was formed under the merger of Chancellor and Evergreen Media.

In 2000, Clear Channel Communications merged with AMFM. This put the new, larger broadcasting company over Federal Communications Commission caps on ownership; because of this, Clear Channel decided to spin off KDJM to Infinity Broadcasting (along with KXKL and KIMN), which was completed in December 2000. By 2001, the station refocused its format as "Jammin' Hits of the 70s & 80s". By 2003, the station was known as "Jammin' Oldies and More" with a broader playlist consisting of some newer R&B music. The station changed its moniker to "Denver's Classic Soul" in 2004. The station became a CBS Radio-owned and operated station with the renaming of Infinity in December 2005.

=== KWLI (2005–2006) ===
On December 14, 2005, the station began stunting with Christmas greetings from soldiers stationed overseas to their families back home, while also telling listeners to tune in at 9 a.m. the following day, when Denver radio would be "set free". (The word "free" seemed to confirm rumors that the station would join CBS's Free FM network of hot talk FM stations.)

Instead, CBS brought country music back to the station as "Willie 92.5" with the moniker "Wide Open Country". The station played a mix of old and new country songs, including some titles no longer heard on Denver's more contemporary country outlets. The call letters were briefly changed to KLWL on December 21, and then to KWLI on January 12, 2006. (Max Media revived the rhythmic oldies format in September 2010 on KTNI-FM.)

In late 2006, KWLI was renamed "92-5 The Wolf" and began focusing on newer country artists. The former format was moved to KWLI's HD2 sub-channel. The station was sold to Wilks Broadcasting in December 2008. When the 2008 Democratic National Convention was held in Denver, then-KWLI temporarily renamed itself as "92.5 The Jackass", with "jackass" being another name for a male donkey, the mascot of the Democratic Party. It reverted to "The Wolf" after the convention.

=== KWOF (2006–2018) ===
On March 6, 2009, KWLI changed its call letters to KWOF.

On January 31, 2014, KWOF briefly rebranded itself as "92.5 The Bronco" in honor of the Denver Broncos participation in Super Bowl XLVIII. The station resumed its "Wolf" branding after the Super Bowl.

On October 12, 2015, Kroenke Sports Enterprises, owned by Altitude Sports and Entertainment founder Stan Kroenke, announced it would acquire Wilks Broadcasting's Denver properties, which included KWOF, KIMN, and KXKL-FM. The transaction was consummated on December 31, 2015, at a purchase price of $54 million.

=== KKSE (2018–present) ===
On September 5, 2018, KSE announced, in a move long rumored and expected after KSE's acquisition of the Wilks stations, that KWOF would drop the "Wolf" format and adopt the format of KKSE (950 AM) as "Altitude Sports 92.5", a change that took place on September 17. With the change, 92.5 became the new primary home for the Denver Nuggets, Colorado Avalanche, and Colorado Rapids, all owned by KSE. New call letters of KKSE-FM were registered at the same time and were adopted with the change.

== Current Programming ==
KKSE's weekday lineup, current as of April 26, 2025 (all times are Mountain Time):

- 6:00 am to 7:00 am: Brett Kane.
- 7:00 am to 10:00 am: Marc Moser, Vic Lombardi and Brett Kane.
- 10:00 am to 12:00 pm: Mike Sanford and Alex Rajaniemi.
- 12:00 pm to 3:00 pm: Tyler Polumbus, Scott Hastings and Darren McKee.
- 3:00 pm to 6:00 pm: Nate Kreckman and Andy Lindahl.

Avalanche post-game shows are hosted by Alex Rajaniemi and Mark Springer. Nuggets post-game shows are hosted by Dan Tanner.
