= KKSE (AM) =

Sports radio station in Parker–Denver, Colorado

- Parker, Colorado; United States
- Broadcast area: Denver metropolitan area
- Frequency: 950 kHz
- Branding: Altitude Sports AM 950

Programming
- Language: English
- Format: Sports radio
- Affiliations: Altitude Sports; Fox Sports Radio; Colorado Avalanche; Colorado Mammoth; Colorado Rapids; Denver Nuggets

Ownership
- Owner: Kroenke Sports & Entertainment; (KSE Radio Ventures, LLC)
- Sister stations: KIMN; KKSE-FM; KXKL-FM

History
- First air date: 1923
- Former call signs: KFEL (1923–1954); KIMN (1954–1988); KYGO (1988–1994); KKFN (1994–2008); KRWZ (2008–2016)
- Call sign meaning: Kroenke Sports & Entertainment

Technical information
- Licensing authority: FCC
- Facility ID: 30839
- Class: B
- Power: 5,000 watts
- Transmitter coordinates: 39°52′29.9″N 104°56′1.9″W
- Repeater: 92.5 KKSE-FM HD2 (Broomfield)

Links
- Public license information: Public file; LMS
- Webcast: Listen live
- Website: www.altitudesportsradio.com

KKSE (950 kHz) is a commercial AM radio station licensed to Parker, Colorado, and serving the Denver metropolitan area. The station is owned by Stan Kroenke through the KSE Radio Ventures subsidiary of Kroenke Sports & Entertainment.

KKSE airs a sports radio format branded as "Altitude Sports 950". KKSE has studios on South Colorado Boulevard in Glendale, with the AM transmitter located off Riverdale Road in Denver. Much of its programming is simulcast on Broomfield-licensed KKSE-FM. KSE Radio Ventures also owns sister stations KIMN and KXKL-FM.

KKSE-AM-FM are the flagship stations for Denver Nuggets basketball, Colorado Avalanche hockey, Colorado Rapids soccer and Colorado Mammoth lacrosse. All four teams are co-owned with KKSE-AM-FM. KKSE-FM carries local sports hosts most of the day and carry syndicated programming from Fox Sports Radio nights and weekends. KKSE-AM carries programming from Fox Sports Radio full-time when not airing live sports.

== History ==
=== KFEL and KIMN ===
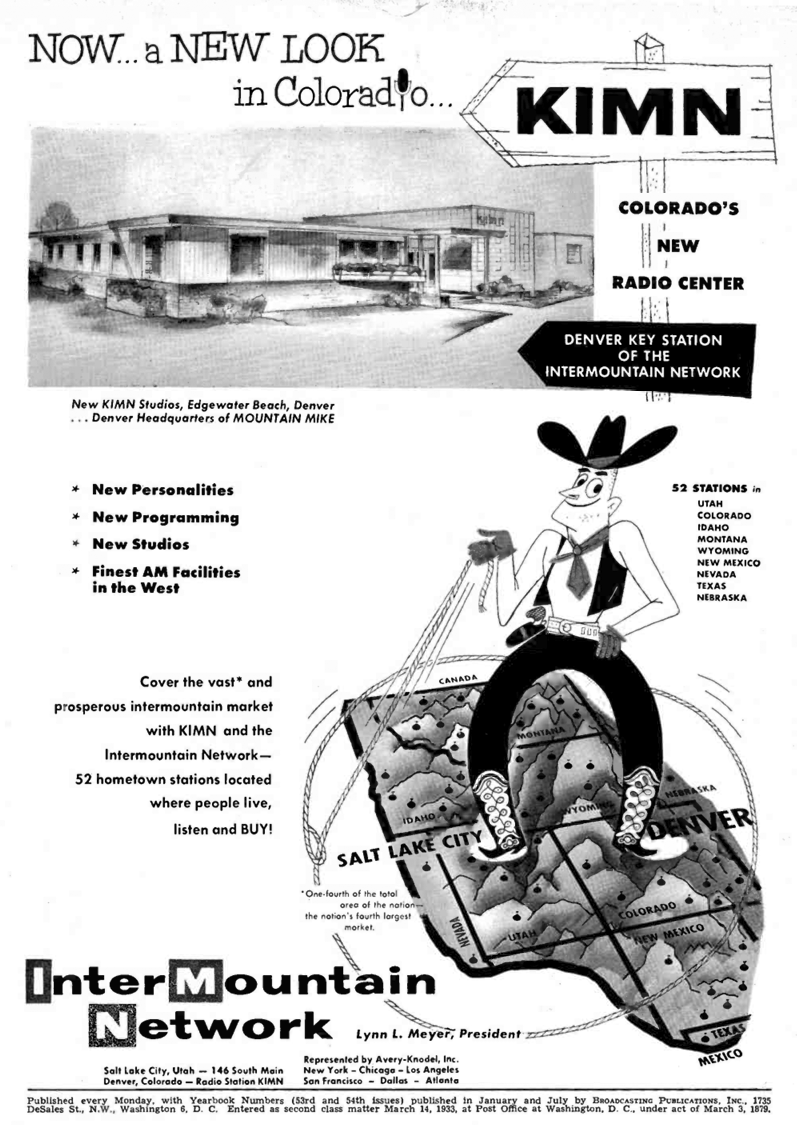
1955 advertisement as KIMN.

The station first signed on in 1923 as KFEL, owned by Gene O'Fallon and broadcasting from the Albany Hotel. It is Denver's second-oldest radio station. After several frequency moves, it eventually settled on its current location of 950 AM. O'Fallon sold the station to Standard Examiner Publishing of Ogden, Utah, in 1954, and the new owners changed the call sign to KIMN.

For most of the next three decades, KIMN was Denver's highly rated Top 40 outlet. It was KIMN that presented the Beatles at the Red Rocks Amphitheatre in August 1964. The station was inducted into the Colorado Music Hall of Fame for its contribution to the Colorado music scene in the 1950s and 1960s. By the late 1980s, KIMN evolved from Top 40 to oldies.

Denver's first airborne traffic reporter was Don Martin on KIMN's "Air Alert", who later became the vice-president of news operations, and is considered the pioneer of live news coverage in Denver. In 2007, Martin was inducted into the Broadcast Pioneers of Colorado Hall of Fame.

=== KYGO country ===
At Noon on April 26, 1988, after airing a 19-hour retrospective of KIMN's history, the station flipped to country music and adopted the KYGO call letters. The programming was separate from co-owned KYGO-FM.

While the FM station concentrated on current and recent country hits, the AM used a deeper library and more personality. It was also a CBS Radio News Network affiliate. KYGO continued for six years playing country music before its owner, Jefferson-Pilot Communications decided on a new direction for the station. (Jefferson-Pilot later became the Lincoln Financial Group.)

=== Switch to sports ===
On October 12, 1994, the station changed its call sign to KKFN, and the station began adding sports talk programs to its schedule. On March 6, 1995, the station completed its shift to becoming the Denver market's first ever sports radio station as "AM 950 The Fan". (The KYGO call sign and country format moved to 1600 AM.)

On March 8, 2008, KKFN's sports format began simulcasting on 104.3 FM (formerly smooth jazz KJCD). The simulcast only lasted six months.

=== Cruisin' Oldies ===
On September 2, 2008, the AM station became KRWZ with an oldies format, using the moniker "Cruisin' Oldies 950".

On December 8, 2014, Entercom announced it would purchase Lincoln Financial's entire 15-station lineup in a $106.5 million deal. Until the transfer was complete, Entercom operated the outlets under a local marketing agreement (LMA). On December 22, 2014, Entercom announced that it would retain KRWZ and its oldies format. The FCC approved the deal on June 26, 2015.

=== Return to sports ===
On December 17, 2015, Entercom announced it would sell KRWZ to KSE Radio Ventures, owned by Stan Kroenke. He added the station to his three recently acquired FM properties in the Denver market. KSE also announced that KRWZ would flip to a new format when the sale closes, as Entercom moved the oldies format to KEZW on December 27. On the same day, KRWZ began stunting with mostly adult standards music, as well as redirecting listeners to KEZW.

Upon the change of ownership, KRWZ adopted the call letters KKSE. KSE announced that the station would return to sports talk and become "Altitude Sports 950" (named after KSE's Altitude cable channel). The new format's programming will include the Rich Eisen Show, along with a schedule of live and local programming. The station was to serve as the radio flagship for the Colorado Avalanche, the Denver Nuggets and the Colorado Rapids, as well as the Colorado Mammoth (all of which are owned by Kroenke).

The sale to KSE closed on March 14, 2016, and the station flipped to a simulcast of KWOF that day at Noon. "Altitude Sports 950" officially launched at 7 a.m. on April 8. KKSE entered a crowded sports talk field in the Denver market, with competitors including KDSP, KDCO and former sister stations KKFN and KEPN.

On September 17, 2018, KKSE moved its local programming to 92.5 FM, with 950 AM becoming mostly a pass-through for Fox Sports Radio programming. The move was made due to its new FM sister's stronger range. The 92.5 FM facility provides at least grade B coverage to almost all of north-central Colorado.

On October 29, 2021, KKSE announced that it would flip the 950 AM signal to a sports betting-focused format on November 1, carrying programming from VSiN outside of live game coverage.

As of March 2025, KKSE switched back to the national Fox Sports Radio programming.
