= KUNC =

Public radio station in Greeley, Colorado

- Greeley, Colorado; United States
- Broadcast area: Northern Colorado
- Frequency: 91.5 MHz (HD Radio)

Programming
- Format: Public radio: news/talk
- Affiliations: NPR; PRX; BBC

Ownership
- Owner: Rocky Mountain Public Media; (CRNC, LLC)
- Sister stations: KJAC

History
- First air date: December 1966
- Former call signs: KCBL-FM (1966–1970)
- Call sign meaning: Founding owner University of Northern Colorado

Technical information
- Licensing authority: FCC
- Facility ID: 68219
- Class: C1
- ERP: 36,000 watts
- HAAT: 384 meters (1,260 ft)
- Transmitter coordinates: 40°37′3″N 105°19′39″W
- Translator: See list

Links
- Public license information: Public file; LMS
- Webcast: [kunc.org/listen Listen live]
- Website: kunc.org

KUNC (91.5 FM) is a radio station licensed to Greeley, Colorado, United States. A service of Rocky Mountain Public Media, it serves Northern Colorado, including Fort Collins and Greeley, and broadcasts a public news-talk radio format. It has studios on 56th Avenue in Greeley and broadcasts from Buckhorn Mountain.

KUNC went on the air in 1966 as KCBL-FM, the 10-watt station of what was then known as Colorado State College. It adopted its current name in 1970 when the college became the University of Northern Colorado, moved to its present frequency that year, and became the state's first NPR affiliate in 1971. The university ran the station until 2001, when it was spun off to Community Radio for Northern Colorado, a licensee group formed in the wake of outcry over a proposal to merge KUNC into Colorado Public Radio. The station expanded coverage into other communities in the state. In 2026, it merged with Rocky Mountain Public Media.

== History ==
=== At the University of Northern Colorado ===
KUNC began operations in 1966 as KCBL-FM at what was then known as Colorado State College. It operated on 91.3 MHz. The college changed its name to University of Northern Colorado (UNC) on May 1, 1970, at which time KCBL-FM became KUNC-FM. That October 31, it moved to 91.5 MHz and upgraded from 10 watts to 3,000 watts. On November 22, 1971, KUNC became the first NPR-affiliated radio station in Colorado, having previously provided an outlet for student training.

=== Community Radio for Northern Colorado era ===
Beginning in the late 1990s, the University of Northern Colorado reduced financial support of KUNC as it moved to redirect its spending to instructional expenses. In February 2001, the university nearly agreed to sell KUNC to Denver-based Colorado Public Radio (CPR) for $1.3 million. CPR intended to broadcast its news/talk service as part of a restructuring into news/talk and classical music stations. This was a departure from the eclectic format of classical, pop, jazz, and folk music KUNC had aired, creating some concern among listeners. However, substantial lobbying led the UNC board of trustees to give the station until the end of February to raise a figure approximating $2 million. A new group, Friends of KUNC, was formed to raise money and by the end of the month had accumulated $865,000 and, in total, $1.9 million. Both public radio organizations had raised their bids when a Christian radio network expressed interest, but after that group withdrew, the trustees chose the local bid because of the concern a combination with a Denver organization had raised.

Under the agreement, the friends group—calling itself Community Radio for Northern Colorado (CRNC)—took over operations of KUNC on July 1, 2001, and moved it out of Carter Hall on the UNC campus to studios in the Bank One Building in downtown Greeley. In the mid-2000s, CRNC upgraded translators and built new full-service licenses across Colorado to prevent pre-emption by other non-commercial broadcasters. In July 2007, KUNC began transmitting from Buckhorn Mountain, northwest of Fort Collins. The new location widened the station's coverage to include most of the northern portion of metro Denver, though some listeners in Grand County lost the signal as a result.

CRNC began providing separate news and music services after it purchased KJAC (105.5 FM) and relaunched it as the adult album alternative station The Colorado Sound in 2016.

=== Merger with Rocky Mountain Public Media ===
In March 2026, Community Radio for Northern Colorado and Rocky Mountain Public Media (RMPM), the parent organization of Rocky Mountain PBS, announced that they had signed a nonbinding letter of intent to explore a merger, citing the end of federal funding for public broadcasting. Under an asset purchase agreement signed on June 30, 2026, a limited liability company operated by RMPM agreed to acquire CRNC's six full-service FM stations, including KUNC and KJAC, along with 11 FM translators.

The Federal Communications Commission approved the transfer in August 2026, and the transaction was completed on October 1. RMPM also assumed control of the Colorado Capitol News Alliance, a statehouse reporting exchange that had included it, KUNC, Colorado Public Radio, and The Colorado Sun.

== Programming ==
KUNC broadcasts programming from National Public Radio, Public Radio Exchange, the BBC, and other public radio producers, as well as locally produced news, commentary, and programming.

== Translators ==
Broadcast translators for KUNC
Call sign	Frequency	City of license	FID	ERP (W)	Class	FCC info
K274BW	102.7 FM	Boulder, Colorado	140247	250	D	LMS
K210AY	89.9 FM	Buena Vista, Colorado	69028	78	D	LMS
KENC	90.7 FM	Estes Park, Colorado	175208	200	A	LMS
K220JN	91.9 FM	Granby, Colorado	142128	115	D	LMS
K259AC	99.7 FM	Gypsum, Colorado	68289	249	D	LMS
K213EJ	90.5 FM	Holyoke, Colorado	55599	134	D	LMS
K206BD	89.1 FM	Julesburg, Colorado	55600	74	D	LMS
K219DX	91.7 FM	Leadville, Colorado	92660	62	D	LMS
K212FN	90.3 FM	Lone Star, Colorado	68244	92	D	LMS
KVNC	90.9 FM	Minturn, Colorado	94204	100	A	LMS
KRNC	88.5 FM	Steamboat Springs, Colorado	106485	240	A	LMS
K267CM	101.3 FM	Steamboat Springs, Colorado	68260	77	D	LMS
K228DL	93.5 FM	Wray, Colorado	55602	74	D	LMS
K202EK	88.3 FM	Yuma, Colorado	68217	113	D	LMS
