= KRCC =

Public radio station in Colorado Springs, Colorado, United States

- Colorado Springs, Colorado; United States
- Broadcast area: Colorado Springs-Pueblo
- Frequency: 91.5 MHz

Programming
- Format: Public radio; news-talk
- Affiliations: National Public Radio, American Public Media, Public Radio Exchange, Rocky Mountain Community Radio, BBC World Service, Colorado Public Radio

Ownership
- Owner: Colorado College; (The Colorado College)
- Operator: Colorado Public Radio (via SSA)
- Sister stations: KECC; KCCS; KWCC

History
- First air date: 1951
- Call sign meaning: Radio Colorado College

Technical information
- Licensing authority: FCC
- Facility ID: 65563
- Class: C1
- ERP: 2,100 watts
- HAAT: 687 meters (2,254 ft)

Links
- Public license information: Public file; LMS
- Webcast: Listen live
- Website: www.krcc.org

KRCC (91.5 FM) is a public radio station in Colorado Springs, Colorado. It is owned by Colorado College and operated by Colorado Public Radio.

KRCC broadcasts non-commercial news/talk programming, mostly from National Public Radio (NPR) and American Public Media. The BBC World Service is heard overnight. The station is also a member of the Mountain West News Bureau.

Its studios are located inside the Southern Colorado Public Media Center on the campus of Colorado College on North Tejon Street in downtown Colorado Springs. The transmitter is located on Cheyenne Mountain amid other Colorado Springs-area TV and FM stations. KRCC is also simulcast on a network of repeater stations around Southern Colorado.

== History ==
KRCC officially signed on in 1951. But the station's history began in 1944 as a public address system for the campus of Colorado College. It became a carrier current station two years later. In April 1951, it received the first non-commercial FM license in the state of Colorado, operating from a World War II surplus transmitter. Its reach was initially limited; broadcast on 91.3 MHz with an effective radiated power of only 10 watts, broadcasting from an antenna that was at minus 480 feet height above average terrain. The ERP was boosted to 165 watts in 1956.

In 1964, the station relocated to the Rastall Center Building, with an ERP of 280 watts. The following year, KRCC was authorized for a frequency change to 91.5 MHz. Another ERP increase in 1973 brought power to 1,730 watts. Originally a training program for radio and speech students, it became a conventional college radio station in 1968 after Colorado College dropped radio and speech classes. In 1978, the station opened its microphones to the greater Colorado Springs community, paving the way for it to become Colorado's third NPR member station in 1984.

From the 1980s onward, it built a series of translators to help better penetrate its largely mountainous service area. It also increased the power of the primary transmitter, In the 1980s, the tower height was boosted to over 2,100 feet (640 m), making the signal comparable to other major FM stations in Colorado Springs.

On January 17, 2020, Colorado College announced a partnership with Colorado Public Radio, the main NPR member for most of the remainder of Colorado, that called for CPR to take over management of KRCC. While Colorado Public Radio will handle all operations, Colorado College will continue to hold the license and the station will still be operated from Colorado Springs. Initially, KRCC's format remained the same. However, the station's daytime schedule was tweaked slightly to match that of CPR's all-news network, and KRCC added CPR's daily statewide news program, "Colorado Matters." As part of the agreement, Colorado College and Colorado Public Radio will collaborate on a "public media center" that will be home to KRCC, the Colorado College Journalism Institute, and Rocky Mountain PBS' Regional Innovation Center.

CPR suspended KRCC's nighttime music programming for much of the spring and summer of 2020 to protect its staffers from the COVID-19 pandemic, but music returned in the fall. With the retirement of longtime KRCC personality and Music Coordinator Vicky Gregor on July 2, 2021, KRCC's long time music programing was finally dropped the week after.

== Network ==
Programming is on the main transmitter in Colorado Springs KRCC 91.5 FM (2100 watts), and is simulcast on three other FM stations:

- KECC in La Junta (740 watts at 91 meters/299 feet)
- KCCS in Starkville (just south of Trinidad) (370 watts at 303 meters/994 feet)
- KWCC in Woodland Park (100 watts at -132 meters/-432 feet).

KRCC also operates seven translators:

- K203AT 88.5 FM Westcliffe / Gardner (250 watts)
- K210CC 89.9 FM Limon (250 watts)
- K211AW 90.1 FM Manitou Springs (86 watts)
- K216DQ 91.1 FM Trinidad / Raton, New Mexico (80 watts)
- K231BR 94.1 FM Walsenburg (50 watts)
- K238BP 95.5 FM Lake George / Florissant / Hartsel (10 watts)
- K239AE 95.7 FM Salida / Buena Vista / Villa Grove (250 watts)
- K289AH 105.7 FM Cañon City (75 watts)
