= KXKL-FM =

Classic hits radio station in Denver

- Denver, Colorado; United States
- Broadcast area: Denver metro area
- Frequency: 105.1 MHz (HD Radio)
- Branding: KOOL 105

Programming
- Language: English
- Format: Classic hits

Ownership
- Owner: Kroenke Sports & Entertainment; (KSE Radio Ventures, LLC)
- Sister stations: KIMN; KKSE; KKSE-FM

History
- First air date: December 1, 1956; 69 years ago
- Former call signs: KTGM (1956–69); KADX (1969–82); KBRQ-FM (1982–87)
- Call sign meaning: KL for "Kool"

Technical information
- Licensing authority: FCC
- Facility ID: 59959
- Class: C
- ERP: 100,000 watts
- HAAT: 356 meters (1,168 ft)
- Transmitter coordinates: 39.600°N 105.210°W

Links
- Public license information: Public file; LMS
- Webcast: Listen live
- Website: www.kool105.com

KXKL-FM (105.1 MHz, "KOOL 105") is a classic hits station serving the Denver metropolitan area. This station is licensed to Denver, Colorado and broadcasts with an ERP of 100 kW and is under ownership of Stan Kroenke's KSE Radio Ventures. Its studios are located on Colorado Boulevard in Glendale, and the transmitter is located on Mt. Morrison.

== History ==
=== Middle of the road (1956–1973) ===
The station began broadcasting in 1956 with the call letters KTGM with a MOR/Beautiful Music format, under the ownership of Good Music Associates. The station was acquired by Sound Corporation of Colorado in 1968, and changed call letters to KADX that same year.

=== Jazz (1973–1981) ===
As KADX, the station had a MOR format that continued until it was sold to Columbine Broadcasting in 1973, who then flipped it to Jazz that same year. By 1978, it was sold again to Welcome Radio, but kept the Jazz format intact.

=== Country (1981–1987) ===
By 1981, Great Empire Broadcasting added KADX to its portfolio, but would flip the station to Country in 1982 and take the call letters KBRQ, simulcasting its AM sister at 1280. During its tenure and through its numerous ownerships, the station, formats, signal, and its ratings, went unnoticed.

=== Oldies/classic hits (1987–present) ===
On July 3, 1987, KBRQ would switch formats to oldies as "KOOL 105", and changed call letters to KXKL. Shamrock Communications owned the station at the time of the flip. The format was also simulcast for the next nine years on 1280 AM. After several ownership changes during the 1990s and 2000s, including Chancellor Media, AM/FM, and Infinity/CBS Radio, Wilks Broadcasting acquired the station in 2008, along with sister stations KIMN and KWOF. Like many oldies stations, KXKL evolved into a classic hits format. Currently, the station focuses on music from the 1980s and 1990s, while also stretching into the 2000s and early 2010s.

The radio station organizes the annual KOOL Concert, featuring live performances from artists from the genre.

On October 12, 2015, Kroenke Sports Enterprises, owned by Altitude Sports and Entertainment founder Stan Kroenke, announced they would acquire Wilks Broadcasting's Denver properties, including KXKL-FM, Country KWOF, and Hot AC KIMN. Once the sale was approved by the FCC, KSE was expected to flip one of the three outlets to Sports, moving its local franchises the Denver Nuggets, Colorado Avalanche, and Colorado Rapids from KKFN. The transaction was consummated on December 31, 2015, at a purchase price of $54 million. However, KXKL retained its Classic Hits format as KWOF made the flip to Sports on September 17, 2018.
