= WMDR-FM =

Southern gospel/Christian country music radio station in Oakland, Maine, United States

- Oakland, Maine; United States
- Broadcast area: Western and Central Maine
- Frequency: 88.9 FM
- Branding: God's Country 89FM

Programming
- Format: Southern gospel; Christian country

Ownership
- Owner: Light of Life Ministries

History
- First air date: January 2006
- Call sign meaning: "Words and Music for Daily Rejoicing"

Technical information
- Licensing authority: FCC
- Class: C0
- ERP: 100,000 watts
- HAAT: 391 meters (1,283 ft)
- Transmitter coordinates: 44.250°N 70.423°W

Links
- Public license information: Public file; LMS
- Webcast: Listen live
- Website: worshipradionetwork.org

WMDR-FM (88.9 MHz) is a non-commercial, listener-supported FM radio station licensed to Oakland, Maine. It calls itself "God's Country 88.9 FM". WMDR-FM broadcasts a southern gospel and Christian country radio format for the Augusta-Waterville, Lewiston-Auburn, Norway-South Paris and Bath-Brunswick areas, as well as parts of Downeast Maine and Northern New Hampshire. It is owned by Light of Life Ministries with studios and offices on Riverside Drive in Augusta.

WMDR-FM is a Class C0 station with an effective radiated power (ERP) of 100,000 watts, the maximum for most American FM stations. The transmitter is on Kilgore Way in Buckfield, Maine, off Maine State Route 117, just east of Norway. Programming is simulcast on WWLN 91.5 FM in Lincoln, Maine.

== History ==
The station signed on the air in January 2006. It has always been a Christian radio station. It was founded by Ray and Susanne Bouchard who began the Worship Radio Network in 2004 when a friend donated the parent station, WMDR (1340 AM) in Augusta. The network also includes Christian contemporary station WWWA (95.3 FM) in Winslow, known as "Reach FM".

WMDR-FM was originally powered at 600 watts, a fraction of its current output. In March 2007, the southern gospel format on WMDR 1340 AM moved to WMDR-FM 88.9. Meanwhile, WMDR-FM's contemporary format moved to WWWA, while WMDR 1340 AM began airing children's Christian programming. In 2010, WMDR-FM boosted its power to 100,000 watts as a Class C station, greatly expanding its coverage area.

Despite the name, the Maine "God's Country" stations have no affiliation with the God's Country Radio Network.

== Translator ==
In addition to the main station, WMDR-FM is relayed by the following FM translator:

Call sign	Frequency	City of license	FID	ERP (W)	Class	FCC info
W264BQ	100.7 FM	Bangor, Maine	145527	170	D	LMS

In 2010 God's Country significantly expanded its signal, with a power upgrade and a transmitter move from a tower in Skowhegan to a taller tower in Buckfield. It also signed on a full-powered rebroadcaster, 91.5 WWLN in Lincoln, Maine.

With the power upgrade to WMDR-FM and the addition of WWLN, several broadcast translators that previously simulcasted WMDR-FM switched to a simulcast of 95.3 WWWA. In 2012, more full-power rebroadcasters went on the air including 89.3 WRPB Benedicta and 91.7 WRNM Ellsworth.
