= KIMN =

Hot adult contemporary radio station in Denver

- Denver, Colorado; United States
- Broadcast area: Denver metro area
- Frequency: 100.3 MHz (HD Radio)
- Branding: Mix 100

Programming
- Language: English
- Format: Hot adult contemporary-Leaning Top 40 (CHR)
- Affiliations: Premiere Networks

Ownership
- Owner: Kroenke Sports & Entertainment; (KSE Radio Ventures, LLC)
- Sister stations: KKSE; KKSE-FM; KXKL-FM

History
- First air date: July 9, 1959; 67 years ago (as KLIR-FM)
- Former call signs: KLIR-FM (1959–1984); KMJI (1984–1989); KXLT (1989–1992); KMJI (1992–1995)
- Call sign meaning: Intermountain Network, former call sign of 950 AM

Technical information
- Licensing authority: FCC
- Facility ID: 59597
- Class: C
- ERP: 98,600 watts (100,000 watts with beam tilt)
- HAAT: 345 meters (1,132 ft)
- Transmitter coordinates: 39.672°N 105.221°W

Links
- Public license information: Public file; LMS
- Webcast: Listen live
- Website: www.mix100.com

KIMN (100.3 FM) is a commercial radio station in Denver, Colorado. The station is owned by Stan Kroenke's KSE Radio Ventures and airs a hot adult contemporary radio format. Studios and offices are located on Yosemite Street in Lone Tree, and the transmitter site is on Mount Morrison west of Lakewood. The station previously had its offices and studio in Glendale.

== Programming ==
The airstaff includes Jeremy Padgett, Katy Mitchel, and Josh Griesemer in the morning. Other station DJs include Nina Blanco, Big Rob (who also serves as the station's program director), Sinna-G and Markie. KIMN carries the syndicated countdown show American Top 40, hosted by Ryan Seacrest. Longtime DJ Dom Testa transferred to sister station KOOL 105 in 2024, leaving Mix 100 after 32 years.

== History ==
=== KLIR-FM (1959–1984) ===
On July 9, 1959, the station signed on as KLIR-FM. It was the FM counterpart to KLIR (990 AM, now KRKS). It was owned by George Basil Anderson and had an effective radiated power (ERP) of 8,800 watts, a fraction of its current power. KLIR-FM originally simulcast the AM station but later began airing a beautiful music/MOR format.

=== Adult contemporary (1984–1994) ===
On June 7, 1984, the station switched to an Adult Contemporary format as KMJI ("Majic 100"), but would later tweak its direction to Soft AC and change its calls to KXLT ("K-Lite 100"). In November 1991, the station returned to the "Majic 100" moniker, and in 1992, the callsign switched back to KMJI.

=== '70s hits (1994–1997) ===
The format evolved to all-'70s hits in June 1994.

The KIMN callsign was picked up on April 18, 1995, along with the name "KIM 100." (From the late 1950s to the early ‘80s, KIMN had been a popular Top 40 station on AM 950.)

=== Adult contemporary (1997–1999) ===
On March 3, 1997, KIMN returned to AC, calling itself "KIM 100.3." Chancellor Media (a forerunner of today's iHeartMedia), acquired KIMN in September 1999.

=== Hot adult contemporary (1999–2014) ===
Also in 1999, the station evolved into a Hot AC format and adopted the "Mix 100” moniker. For the next several years, weekend programming on KIMN featured music entirely from the 1980s. Infinity Broadcasting, a division of CBS Radio, acquired KIMN in August 2000.

In June 2008, KIMN became the Denver affiliate for the syndicated weekday show "On-Air with Ryan Seacrest." The station discontinued the show in February 2009, but to this day they still carry American Top 40 which is currently hosted by Seacrest. In March 2009, CBS Radio sold KIMN, along with sister stations KWOF and KXKL-FM, to Wilks Broadcasting.

=== Adult top 40 (2014–2016) ===
In the summer of 2014, KIMN updated its moniker to "Mix 100.3", changed its positioning statement from "Denver's Best Music Mix" to "All The Hits", and shifted towards Top 40 (CHR). Despite the format adjustment, KIMN continues to report to both Mediabase and Billboard/BDS's Adult Top 40 charts.

The shift also put the station more in competition with Adult Top 40 rival KALC, owned by Entercom, and iHeartMedia's Top 40/CHR KPTT.

=== Hot adult contemporary (2016–present) ===
Previous logo

In 2016, the station returned to its previous moniker "Mix 100" and a new positioning statement, "Denver's Best Music"

On October 12, 2015, Kroenke Sports Enterprises (KSE), parent company of the Denver Nuggets, Colorado Avalanche, and Colorado Rapids, announced it would acquire Wilks Broadcasting's Denver properties: KIMN, Country KWOF, and Classic Hits KXKL-FM. Once the sale was approved by the FCC, KSE was expected to flip one of the three outlets to all-sports. The new FM sports station would likely claim the broadcasting rights to KSE's teams from rival FM sports station KKFN, owned by Bonneville International.

The transaction was consummated on December 31, 2015, at a purchase price of $54 million. However, KIMN retained their Hot AC format as KWOF made the flip to Sports on September 17, 2018.

== KIMN callsign history ==
The call sign KIMN originally belonged to a Denver AM station located at 950 kHz. From the late 1950s to the early 1980s, KIMN was the dominant Top 40 music station in Denver. The station also highlighted the popular local rock n' roll bands of that era, such as the Astronauts, Daniels, Fogcutters, Moonrakers, Soul Survivors, and others. The station had other nicknames as the Denver Tiger, Boss Radio, and 95 Fabulous KIMN. The station was then owned and operated by Kenneth E. Palmer (1925–1984).
