= KVOD =

Classical music radio station in Lakewood–Denver, Colorado

- Lakewood, Colorado; United States
- Broadcast area: Denver metropolitan area
- Frequency: 88.1 MHz
- Branding: CPR Classical

Programming
- Format: Classical (Public)

Ownership
- Owner: Colorado Public Radio; (Public Broadcasting of Colorado, Inc)
- Sister stations: KCFR-FM; KVOQ

History
- First air date: 2005
- Former call signs: KFDN (2005–2008)
- Call sign meaning: Classical Voice of Denver

Technical information
- Licensing authority: FCC
- Facility ID: 83535
- Class: C3
- ERP: 4,400 watts
- HAAT: 321 meters (1,053 ft)
- Transmitter coordinates: 39°40′18″N 105°13′5″W

Links
- Public license information: Public file; LMS
- Webcast: Listen live
- Website: cpr.org

KVOD (88.1 FM) is a public radio station broadcasting a classical music format. Licensed to Lakewood, Colorado, United States, it serves the Denver metropolitan area. Owned by Public Broadcasting Of Colorado, KVOD is simulcast on other stations around Colorado including 91.9 KCFP in Pueblo, 103.3 KPRU in Delta (serving the Grand Junction and Montrose areas), and 90.5 KVOV in Glenwood Springs.

KVOD's transmitter is on Lookout Mountain in Golden, along with several other Denver-area FM and TV stations. The studios and offices are on South Alton Court in Centennial, near Interstate 25.

== History ==
KVOD's classical format and call sign were originally on 99.5 MHz from 1969 to 1995. KVOD was a commercial radio station, marketing as the "Voice of Classical Music" (or Classical Voice of Denver) for the Denver metro area, powered at 100,000 watts. It was acquired by Henry Broadcasting in 1983. Even earlier in Denver radio, AM 630 had used the KVOD call letters (that station is now KHOW).

In 1995, with ratings in decline, especially among young adults, Henry Broadcasting decided to sell the station to Tribune Media. Tribune was not interested in continuing the classical format, switching the 99.5 frequency to classic rock KKHK (now KQMT). Meanwhile, Chancellor Media, the owner of a 57,000-watt country FM station in the suburbs of Denver, 92.5 KZDG in Greeley, decided to pick up KVOD's format and call letters.

In May 1999, 92.5 was acquired by AMFM Inc., a forerunner of today's iHeartMedia. AMFM announced a format switch for 92.5 to Jammin' Oldies as KDJM (now KKSE-FM), and moved the KVOD call sign and classical music format to AM 1280 (now KBNO). Within a four-year timespan, KVOD's classical music and call sign had moved from a 100,000-watt FM station to a 57,000-watt FM station, and then to a 5,000-watt AM station.

In September 2000, the owner of 1280 AM, Clear Channel, sold the station to a Spanish-language broadcaster. At the same time, Colorado Public Radio (CPR) acquired the KVOD call letters and the station's extensive music library, and in March 2001, KVOD relaunched at 90.1 MHz, as a listener-supported, non-commercial station. The new KVOD 90.1 was powered at 44,000 watts. KCFR, a news and information station, relocated to 1340 AM (now KDCO).

In 2008, CPR decided to go FM-only and restore the news and information format to 90.1 FM. To maintain classical programming, CPR acquired the 88.1 frequency, which the Educational Media Foundation (EMF) had built and signed on in 2005 as KFDN with its K-Love programming, for $8.2 million. (The original construction permit was held by Colorado Christian University and had been acquired by EMF along with a string of construction permits and translators.) On July 9, 2008, CPR moved KVOD's classical programming and call letters to the former KFDN, a Class A station with an effective radiated power of 430 watts, while 90.1 became the new KCFR-FM, the new home of Colorado Public Broadcasting's news and information programming, previously heard on AM.

The move of classical programming to 88.1 put CPR's classical music service on a significantly less powerful signal, effectively limiting the station's coverage to only the greater Denver area and causing many former listeners to lose service. The station was granted three power increases—in 2010, 2012, and 2017—and now is a Class C3 station broadcasting with 4,400 watts.

== Translators ==
The station's signal is relayed by the following translator stations.

| Call sign | Frequency | City of license | FID | ERP (W) | FCC info |
|---|---|---|---|---|---|
| K260AL | 99.9 FM | Arvada, Colorado | 140238 | 250 watts | LMS |
| K273AE | 102.5 FM | Cortez, Colorado | 43620 | 79 watts | LMS |
| K204DZ | 88.7 FM | Dove Creek, Colorado | 106490 | 100 watts | LMS |
| K206BE | 89.1 FM | Gunnison, Colorado | 53794 | 50 watts | LMS |
