= KVXO =

- Fort Collins, Colorado; United States
- Broadcast area: Fort Collins-Greeley, Windsor, Colorado
- Frequency: 88.3 MHz
- Branding: CPR Classical

Programming
- Format: Classical
- Affiliations: National Public Radio

Ownership
- Owner: Public Broadcasting of Colorado, Inc.

History
- First air date: 2005
- Former call signs: KWWY (2002–2003); KLHV (2003–2008, 2008–2009); KGCO (2008, 2009–2014, 2014–2015); KEZF (2014); KRKY-FM (2015); KVXQ (2015–2018)

Technical information
- Licensing authority: FCC
- Facility ID: 84102
- Class: A
- ERP: 140 watts
- HAAT: 374 meters (1,227 ft)
- Transmitter coordinates: 40°37′3″N 105°19′40″W

Links
- Public license information: Public file; LMS
- Website: cpr.org/classical

KVXO (88.3 FM) is a radio station licensed to Fort Collins, Colorado, United States. The station is owned and operated by Public Broadcasting of Colorado, Inc., and broadcasts a classical music format to the Ft. Collins-Greeley area.

== History ==
The WAY-FM Media Group received the original construction permit for a new FM station in Ft. Collins, Colorado, from the Federal Communications Commission on June 7, 2002, almost six years after filing the initial application. The new station was assigned the call letters KWWY by the FCC on June 27, 2002.

In October 2002, WAY-FM Media Group, Inc., applied to transfer the construction permit for this station to Colorado Christian University in compliance with their July 2001 consent agreement. The deal was approved by the FCC on November 19, 2002, and the transaction was consummated on January 6, 2003.

The station's callsign was changed to KLHV on February 28, 2003, to better fit the "K-Love" branding. In August 2003, Colorado Christian University reached an agreement to transfer this station and its construction permit to the Educational Media Foundation. The deal was approved by the FCC on October 2, 2003, and the transaction was consummated on November 25, 2003. The station received its broadcast license from the FCC on June 7, 2005.

On June 1, 2008, the station was assigned the call sign KGCO. Just 18 days later it reverted to the previous KLHV assignment until February 17, 2009, when the station once again was assigned the call sign KGCO by the FCC to match the move to the God's Country Radio Network and a new format.

On March 26, 2013, KGCO was purchased from Educational Media Foundation by Cedar Cove Broadcasting, Inc. for $10. The purchase was consummated on May 1, 2013. The station's call sign was changed to KEZF on January 29, 2014, back to KGCO on May 26, 2014, and to KRKY-FM on January 9, 2015.

Effective July 24, 2015, KRKY-FM was swapped to Public Broadcasting of Colorado, Inc. (Colorado Public Radio) in exchange for KVOQ and the cancellation of $100,000 in debt. On July 31, 2015, KRKY-FM changed its call sign to KVXQ, and dropped its Spanish-language religious programming in favor of Colorado Public Radio's "OpenAir" AAA format.

On November 27, 2018, Colorado Public Radio moved the AAA format to a newly-acquired translator in Fort Collins, adding their classical music format to KVXQ in its place. On November 30, 2018, the station's call sign was changed to KVXO.
