= WRPB =

Radio station in Benedicta, Maine, United States

- Benedicta, Maine; United States
- Frequency: 89.1 MHz
- Branding: God's Country

Programming
- Format: Christian contemporary music
- Affiliations: God's Country

Ownership
- Owner: Light of Life Ministries
- Sister stations: WMDR-FM

History
- Former frequencies: 89.3 MHz (2012–2023)

Technical information
- Licensing authority: FCC
- Facility ID: 174218
- Class: C3
- ERP: 4,400 watts
- HAAT: 163 meters
- Transmitter coordinates: 46°01′27″N 68°15′08″W

Links
- Public license information: Public file; LMS
- Webcast: Listen Online
- Website: https://worshipradionetwork.org

WRPB (89.1 FM) is a radio station licensed to Benedicta, Maine, United States. The station is owned by Light of Life Ministries and airs God's Country which originates on Oakland, Maine based flagship station, WMDR-FM.
