= Pikes Peak State College =

Community college in Colorado Springs, Colorado, US

- Former names: El Paso Community College (1968–1978); Pikes Peak Community College (1978–2022)
- Motto: Students Succeed At PPSC
- Type: Public community college
- Established: 1968
- Academic affiliations: Space-grant
- President: Lance Bolton
- Location: Colorado Springs, Colorado, United States; 38.764491°N 104.786739°W
- Colors: Green, Blue
- Nickname: PPSC
- Mascot: Arnie the Aardvark
- Website: www.pikespeak.edu
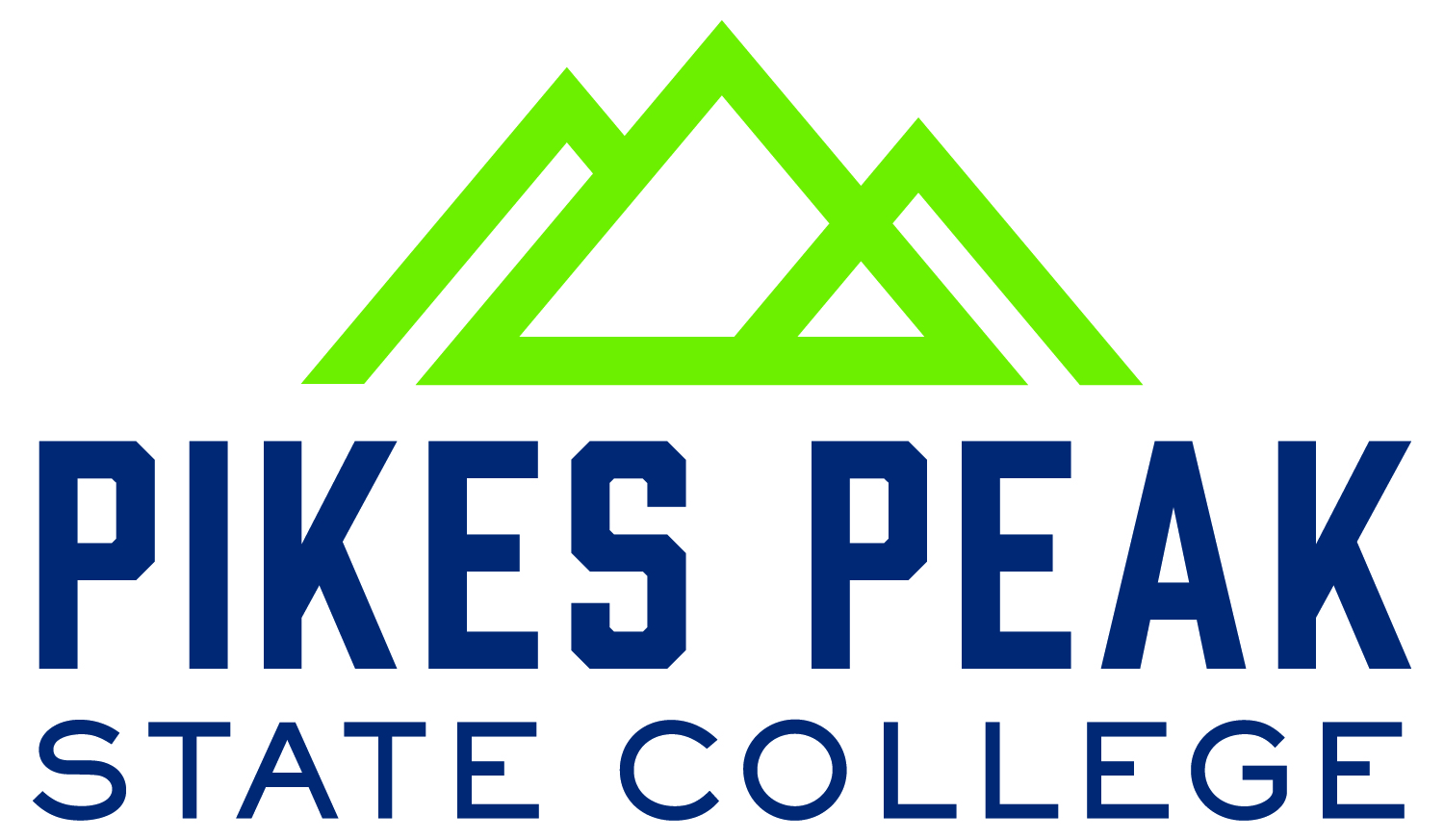

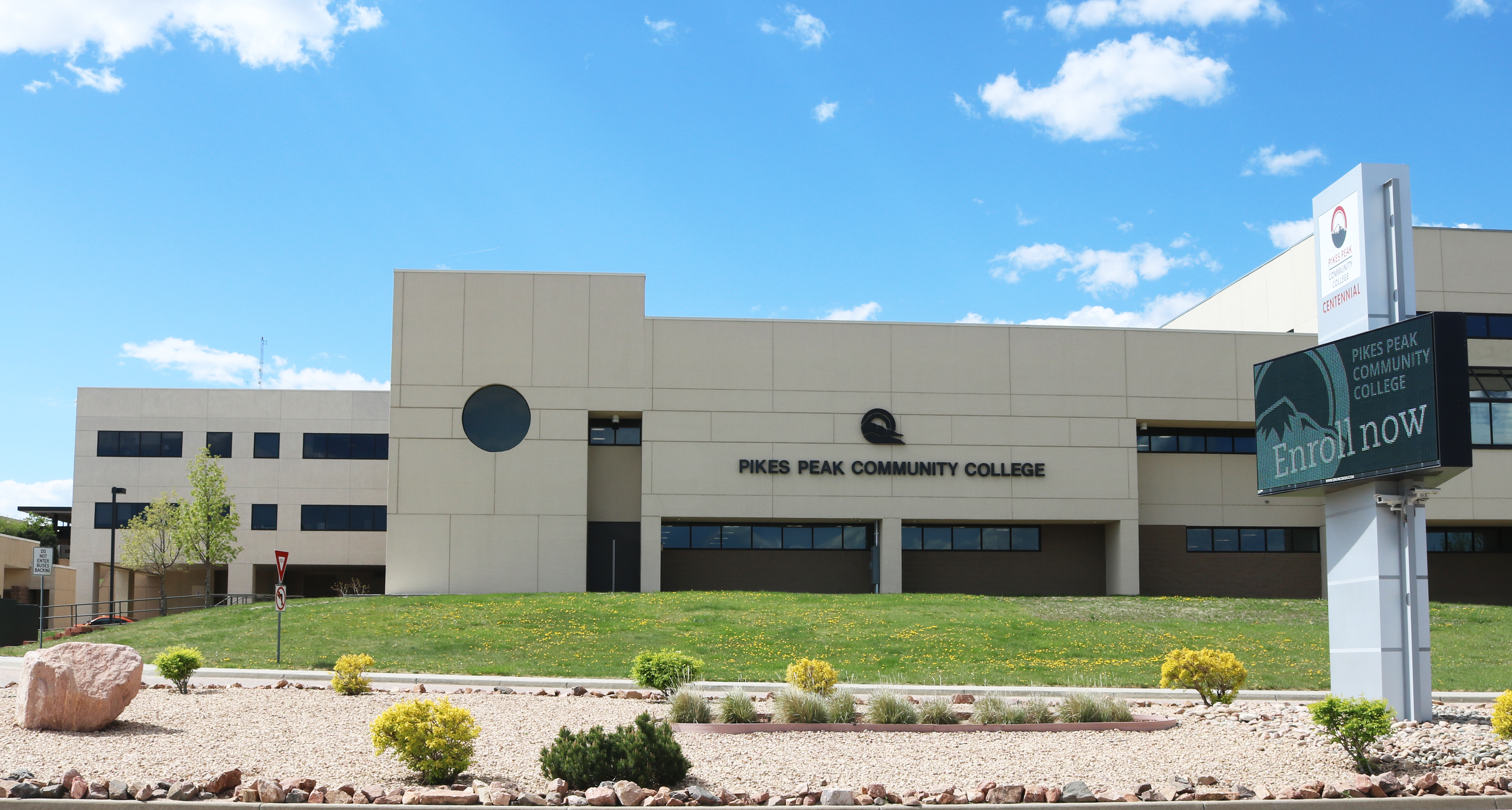
PPSC's Centennial Campus.

Pikes Peak State College is a public community college in Colorado Springs, Colorado, United States. It is the largest institution of higher education in the Pikes Peak region. PPSC offers more than 150 programs in liberal arts and sciences transfer and career technical education. The college's 60+60 Bachelor's Degree Transfer Program guarantees transfer of the PPSC Associate of Arts or Associate of Science degrees to any public institution of higher education in Colorado.

In 2018, the college had an enrollment of 13,204, making it the third-largest institution in the Colorado Community College System.

== History ==
Pikes Peak State College was originally founded as El Paso Community College in 1968 without an official college campus. In 1978 a new campus was constructed on surplus land on the northern edge of Fort Carson; at the same time the college name was changed to Pikes Peak Community College.

During the 2022 Colorado legislative session, college administrators, along with state elected officials, introduced legislation to change the name of the college. The purpose of the bill was to change the perceived value of community colleges and to better reflect the broad range of degrees available. The bill was signed by Colorado Governor Jared Polis which officially changed Pikes Peak Community College to Pikes Peak State College.

== Campuses ==
Pikes Peak State College has four campuses, three military satellite locations, and an extensive distance education program. The largest campus, the Centennial Campus, is located in southern Colorado Springs near the Fort Carson Army post. The Downtown Studio Campus is located in the heart of downtown Colorado Springs. The Rampart Range Campus is located at the north end of the city alongside the college's newest addition, the Center for Healthcare Education and Simulation (CHES) Campus.

While students may study General Education (CORE) courses at all four campuses, certain programs are site specific. Centennial Campus is the largest and specializes in the field of study pertaining to business, public services, and technical and social sciences. The CHES campus offers healthcare and technical programs including an emergency medical services (EMS) training program with an EMS simulation (SIM) Lab. Rampart Range Campus hosts some of the STEM programs. The Downtown Studio Campus is a hub for the fine arts programs and humanities. In 2008 the Falcon Campus was opened, but is no longer in service to the college. Three satellite education centers offer a variety of courses and programs at local Military bases. Courses for military education are held at various dates and times which are different from the traditional semester.

== Student Services ==
- PPSC has a local Radio station, Extra 89.1 and 102.1 FM, run by students and faculty of the radio program
- Parley is the annual student magazine, also published is SITREP, a military focused magazine published each year on veterans day
- Tutoring at no cost is available in Learning Commons at each campus, in addition to the Online Writing Lab OWL
- Promise Programs provide tuition assistance to recent District 2 and District 11 High School Graduates
- Canvas Credit Union Community Pantry provides food to students at no cost to prevent food insecurity at each campus

== Notable alumni ==
- Max Aaron, 2013 U.S. national champion figure skater
- Dartanyon Crockett, 2014 judo World Champion
- Alexa Scimeca, 2013 U.S. National silver medalist figure skater
- Leslie Smith, professional mixed martial arts fighter competing in the bantamweight division, formerly with the UFC
- Ron Stallworth, police officer and author whose novel, Black Klansman, was turned into a film by Spike Lee.
