= Lisman, Alabama =

- Town
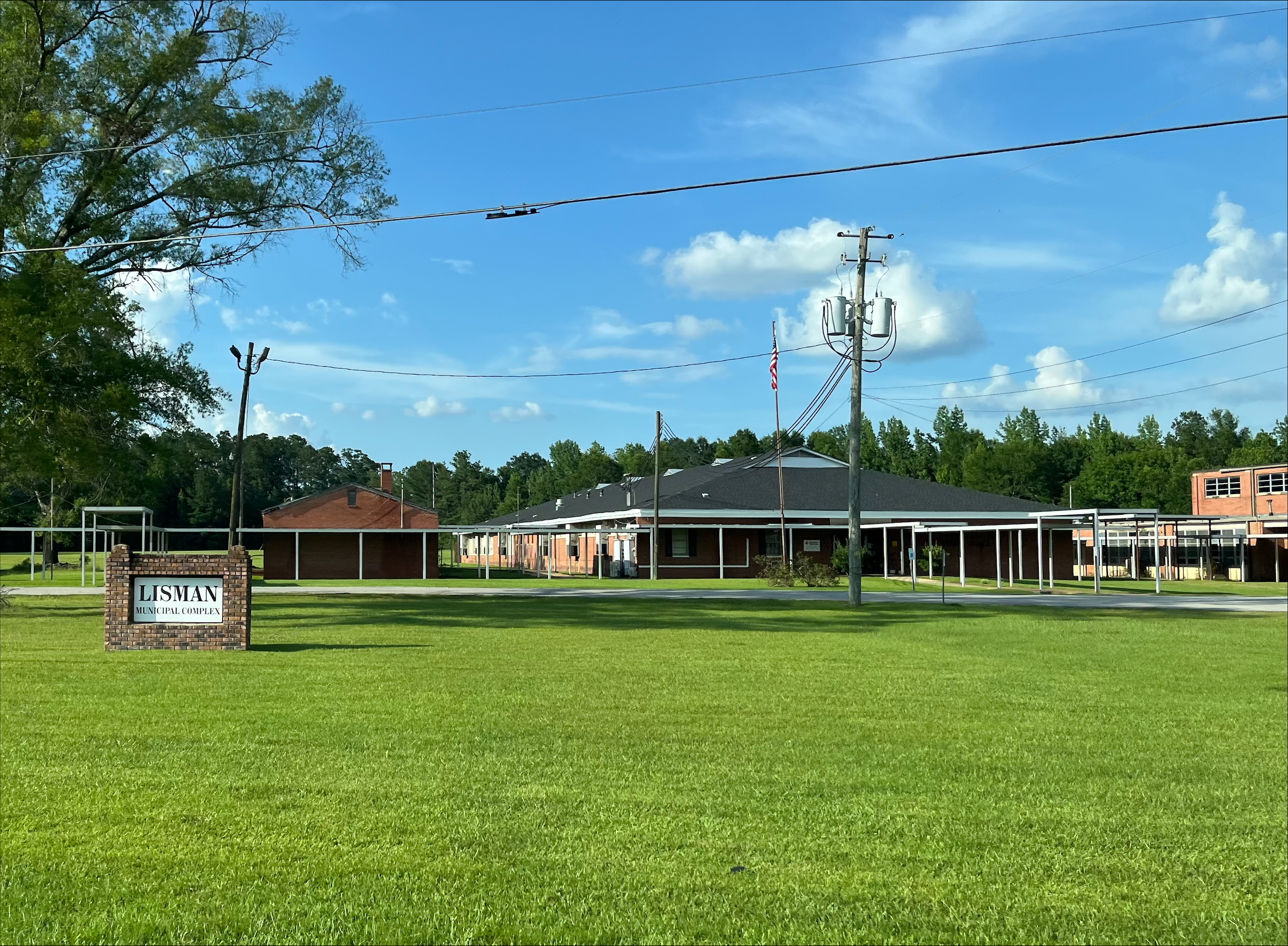
- Lisman Municipal Complex

- Flag Seal

- Location of Lisman in Choctaw County, Alabama.
- Coordinates: 32°10′20″N 88°17′22″W
- Country: United States
- State: Alabama
- County: Choctaw

Area
  - Total: 2.59 sq mi (6.70 km^{2})
  - Land: 2.59 sq mi (6.70 km^{2})
  - Water: 0 sq mi (0.00 km^{2})
- Elevation: 213 ft (65 m)

Population (2020)
  - Total: 427
  - Density: 165.1/sq mi (63.76/km^{2})
- Time zone: UTC-6 (Central (CST))
  - Summer (DST): UTC-5 (CDT)
- ZIP codes: 36906, 36910, 36912
- Area codes: 205, 659
- FIPS code: 01-43384
- GNIS feature ID: 2406024
- Website: https://townoflisman.com/home/

Lisman is a town in Choctaw County, Alabama, United States. At the 2020 census, the population was 427. Lisman was named after a 19th-century railroad investor at the time of construction of the nearby rail line.

== Geography ==
Lisman is located in northern Choctaw County.

According to the U.S. Census Bureau, the town has a total area of 2.6 square miles (6.7 km^{2}), all land.

== History ==
In 1962, local residents participated in "a federal lawsuit challenging the white Choctaw County registrars who were rejecting 95 percent of black voters’ applications." Martin Luther King visited the town to lead a rally for voting rights on April 30, 1966.

The town incorporated in 1979, which enabled it to pave its dirt roads, and build sewers.

A 2019 article described Mayor Jason Ward's plans to hire a police officer and rebuild the abandoned school library.

Lisman was not included in Choctaw County's new “Opportunity Zones” in 2019.

== Demographics ==
Historical population
Census	Pop.	Note	%±
1920	521		—
1930	521		0.0%
1940	545		4.6%
1950	606		11.2%
1960	909		50.0%
1970	636		−30.0%
1980	638		0.3%
1990	481		−24.6%
2000	653		35.8%
2010	539		−17.5%
2020	427		−20.8%
U.S. Decennial Census; 2010 2020

=== 2020 census ===
Lisman town, Alabama – Demographic Profile (NH = Non-Hispanic) Note: the US Census treats Hispanic/Latino as an ethnic category. This table excludes Latinos from the racial categories and assigns them to a separate category. Hispanics/Latinos may be of any race.
Race / Ethnicity	Pop 2010	Pop 2020	% 2010	% 2020
White alone (NH)	36	15	6.68%	3.51%
Black or African American alone (NH)	496	393	92.02%	92.04%
Native American or Alaska Native alone (NH)	0	1	0.00%	0.23%
Asian alone (NH)	0	0	0.00%	0.00%
Pacific Islander alone (NH)	0	0	0.00%	0.00%
Some Other Race alone (NH)	0	0	0.00%	0.00%
Mixed Race/Multi-Racial (NH)	6	12	1.11%	2.81%
Hispanic or Latino (any race)	1	6	0.19%	1.41%
Total	539	427	100.00%	100.00%

=== 2000 census ===
As of the census of 2000, there were 653 people, 245 households, and 171 families residing in the town. The population density was 257.6 inhabitants per square mile (99.5/km^{2}). There were 269 housing units at an average density of 106.1 per square mile (41.0/km^{2}). The racial makeup of the town was 91.42% Black or African American, 7.20% White and 1.38% from two or more races. 0.15% of the population were Hispanic or Latino of any race.

There were 245 households, out of which 33.1% had children under the age of 18 living with them, 42.4% were married couples living together, 24.5% had a female householder with no husband present, and 29.8% were non-families. 28.2% of all households were made up of individuals, and 10.6% had someone living alone who was 65 years of age or older. The average household size was 2.67 and the average family size was 3.28.

In the town, the population was spread out, with 31.1% under the age of 18, 6.9% from 18 to 24, 25.4% from 25 to 44, 23.3% from 45 to 64, and 13.3% who were 65 years of age or older. The median age was 36 years. For every 100 females, there were 82.9 males. For every 100 females age 18 and over, there were 83.7 males.

The median income for a household in the town was $20,333, and the median income for a family was $22,750. Males had a median income of $31,719 versus $14,375 for females. The per capita income for the town was $11,295. About 36.4% of families and 36.7% of the population were below the poverty line, including 40.7% of those under age 18 and 37.9% of those age 65 or over.
