= WWWA (FM) =

WWWA and WMEY
WWWA: Winslow, Maine; WMEY: Bowdoin, Maine; United States
- Broadcast area: Central Maine
- Frequencies: WWWA: 95.3 MHz; WMEY: 88.1 MHz
- Branding: Reach FM

Programming
- Format: Christian contemporary, praise and worship music

Ownership
- Owner: Light of Life Ministries, Inc.
- Sister stations: WMDR (AM), WMDR-FM

History
- First air date: WWWA: April 23, 1999; WMEY: a

Technical information
- Licensing authority: FCC
- Facility ID: WWWA: 37467; WMEY: 123284
- Class: WWWA: C2; WMEY: B
- ERP: WWWA: 12,000 watts; WMEY: 50,000 watts
- HAAT: WWWA: 205 meters (673 ft); WMEY: 39.2 meters (129 ft)
- Transmitter coordinates: WWWA: 44°42′48″N 69°43′39″W
- Translator(s): 91.3 W217CJ (Portland)); 94.7 W234CG (Brunswick)

Links
- Public license information: WWWA: Public file; LMS; WMEY: Public file; LMS
- Webcast: Listen Live
- Website: thereachfm.com

WWWA (95.3 FM) is a non-commercial radio station licensed to Winslow, Maine, United States, and serves Central Maine broadcasting a mixture of Christian contemporary and praise and worship music. The station is owned by Light of Life Ministries, Inc. The studios and offices are on Riverside Drive in Augusta.

The transmitter is on Bigelow Hill Road in Skowhegan. Programming is simulcast on WMEY (88.1 FM) in Bowdoin. It is also heard on FM translators in Portland and Brunswick.

== History ==
The station signed on the air on April 23, 1999. Joan Graves served as the general manager.

On June 20, 2022, WWWA rebranded as "Reach FM". The station holds on-air fundraisers and seeks donations on its website to support its ministry. WWWA's programming is simulcast on 88.1 WMEY in Bowdoin, Maine.
