= WMDR (AM) =

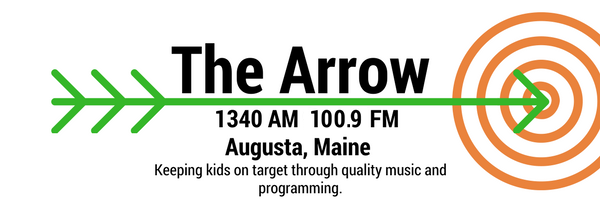
- Augusta, Maine; United States
- Broadcast area: Kennebec–Somerset County, Maine
- Frequency: 1340 kHz
- Branding: The Arrow

Programming
- Format: Religious children's radio

Ownership
- Owner: Light of Life Ministries, Inc.
- Sister stations: WMDR-FM; WWWA

History
- First air date: October 2, 1946
- Former call signs: WFAU (1946–1994)
- Call sign meaning: Words and Music for Daily Rejoicing

Technical information
- Licensing authority: FCC
- Facility ID: 37469
- Class: C
- Power: 1,000 watts
- Transmitter coordinates: 44°19′41.25″N 69°45′52.16″W
- Translator: 100.9 W265DP (Augusta)

Links
- Public license information: Public file; LMS
- Webcast: Listen live
- Website: www.worshipradionetwork.org

WMDR (1340 AM) is an American radio station licensed to Augusta, Maine. It is owned by Light of Life Ministries and carries religious children's programming.

== History ==
WMDR signed on the air on October 2, 1946, as an affiliate of Mutual and Yankee networks. in 1994, its call sign and nostalgia format moved to 1280 AM, while 1340 became religious station WMDR. (The 1280 frequency became WJYE in 2014 and WHTP in 2020). In May 1998, WMDR changed formats to a religious children's format, changing to southern gospel in late 2005, with the religious children's format moving to WMDR-FM. In March 2007, AM 1340 once again flipped formats with its FM counterpart, inheriting the contemporary Christian music format.

In 2009, the religious children's format was moved to an on demand section of their website and 1340 changed to a Christian-based talk radio station.

Sometime in early 2017, WMDR returned to airing a religious children's format, now branded as "The Arrow".

== Translators ==
In addition to the main station, WMDR is relayed by an FM translator.

Call sign	Frequency	City of license	FID	ERP (W)	Class	Transmitter coordinates	FCC info
W265DP	100.9 FM	Augusta, Maine	200907	60	D	44°18′35.2″N 69°49′39.1″W	LMS
