= KCFR-FM =

Colorado Public Radio news/talk station in Denver

- Denver, Colorado; United States
- Frequency: 90.1 MHz (HD Radio)
- Branding: CPR News

Programming
- Format: Public radio and talk
- Affiliations: NPR

Ownership
- Owner: Colorado Public Radio; (Public Broadcasting of Colorado, Inc)
- Sister stations: KVOD; KVOQ

History
- First air date: November 4, 1970
- Former call signs: KCFR (1970–2001); KVOD (2001–2008)
- Call sign meaning: Colorado Free Radio

Technical information
- Licensing authority: FCC
- Facility ID: 53777
- Class: C1
- ERP: 50,000 watts
- HAAT: 277 meters (909 ft)
- Transmitter coordinates: 39°43′49.08″N 105°15′1.08″W

Links
- Public license information: Public file; LMS
- Webcast: Listen live
- Website: cpr.org

KCFR-FM (90.1 FM) is a noncommercial radio station licensed to Denver, Colorado, United States, owned by Colorado Public Radio and simulcast over several AM and FM stations throughout the state. The signals from some of these stations also extend into eastern Utah and southern Wyoming. Some of KCFR-FM's programming is heard on KPRE 89.9 FM in Vail, which also carries programming from classical music station KVOD, also located in Denver.

On July 9, 2008, CPR moved the KCFR-FM news-talk programming in Denver to 90.1 FM. The KVOD classical programming that was broadcast on that frequency moved to the newly acquired 88.1 FM signal. KCFR-FM broadcasts in HD Radio; the second digital subchannel simulcasts KVOD.

== Programming ==
KCFR-FM, KVOQ and KCFC broadcast programming from NPR (including Morning Edition and All Things Considered), as well as an original daily interview show called Colorado Matters.

== History ==
KCFR ("Colorado Free Radio") was owned by the University of Denver, between 1970 and 1983, on 90.1 FM. In 1984, the station was transferred to a community board of directors which eventually formed Colorado Public Radio (CPR). It has always been an NPR affiliate, having signed on as a charter member of the network.

In September 2000, CPR acquired the intellectual properties of then-AM classical station KVOD. In March 2001, KVOD replaced KCFR at 90.1 FM and KCFR was moved to 1340 AM. On July 9, 2008, KCFR-FM moved back to 90.1 FM, with KVOD moving to the newly acquired 88.1 FM frequency.
