= Colorado Public Radio =

Public radio network in Colorado, United States

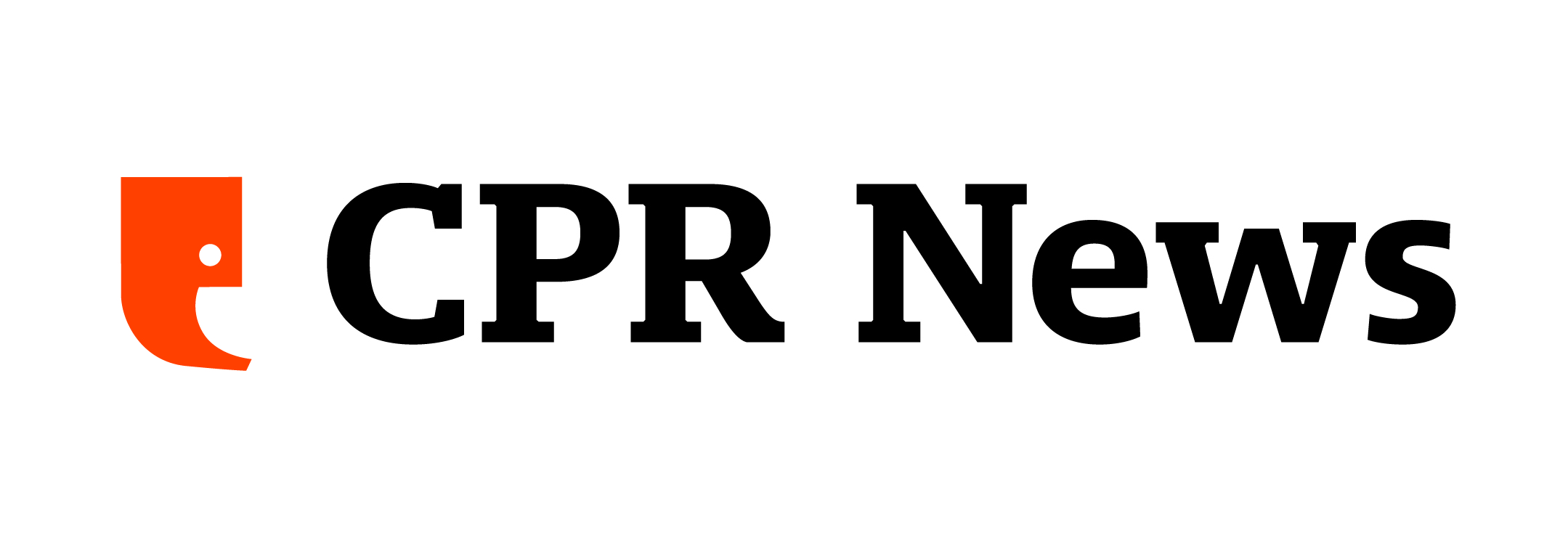

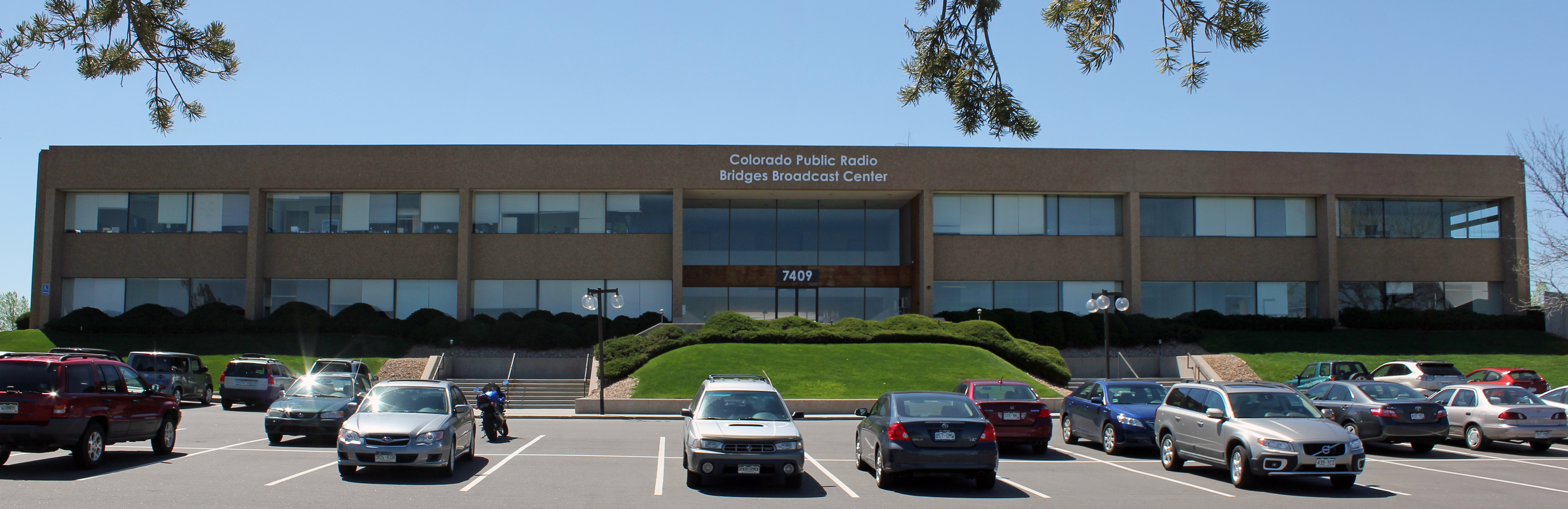
- The Colorado Public Radio studios in Centennial, Colorado.
- Type: Public radio network
- Country: United States
- Broadcast area: Colorado

Programming
- Affiliations: National Public Radio

Ownership
- Owner: Public Broadcasting Of Colorado Inc.

History
- Founded: 1991

Coverage
- Stations: CPR News; CPR Classical; Indie 102.3; KRCC

Links
- Website: www.cpr.org

Colorado Public Radio (CPR) is a public radio state network based at the Bridges Broadcast Center on South Alton Court in the Denver, Colorado city of Centennial that broadcasts three services: news, classical music and Indie 102.3, which plays adult album alternative music. CPR airs its programming on 15 full-power stations, augmented by 17 translators. Their combined signal reaches 80 percent of Colorado. CPR also manages KRCC, the NPR member station in Colorado Springs, in partnership with the station's owner, Colorado College.

As of 2013, CPR had 440,000 weekly listeners, 47,000 contributing members and annual revenue of $14 million. In early-March 2019, CPR acquired hyperlocal news site Denverite from Spirited Media to bolster its web news coverage for locals.

CPR is a nonprofit, 501(c)(3) organization. Private support from listeners, corporations, foundations and partners accounts for approximately 95 percent of CPR's total budget. Funds from the federal government amounting to $1.4 million are around 5 or 6 percent of the station's budget before funding cuts of the Rescissions Act of 2025.

== History ==
The first station in what would become Colorado Public Radio, KCFR (90.1 FM) in Denver, went on the air in 1970. The station was initially licensed to the University of Denver. In 1973, KCFR began carrying programming from National Public Radio (NPR), beginning with All Things Considered. Morning Edition was added in 1979. More NPR programming was added the following year when the network began to distribute programming via satellite.

KCFR separated from the University of Denver in 1984, becoming a community-licensed public radio station. That same year, KPRN in Grand Junction signed on the air. In 1991, KPRN merged with KCFR, forming the new entity, Colorado Public Radio. The original plan as proposed to the Western Slope listeners and the FCC during the license acquisition phase was to continue providing original localized programming for the needs of the Western Slope audience. But despite protests from those listeners, within a few years the KPRN studios were closed, all volunteers and news staff positions were eliminated and it became a satellite station of KCFR.

CPR added more satellite stations in the following years, including KPRE Vail in 1994, KCFP Pueblo in 1996, and KPRH Montrose in 1998. CPR also began adding other low-power translators, sometimes in competition with existing public radio stations. Stations in other areas not served by CPR, like KDNK in Carbondale, complained that CPR would also send out fundraising solicitation letters to KDNK listeners leaving the impression that they could thank CPR for receiving popular NPR programs like All Things Considered or Morning Edition, sometimes resulting in misdirected donations.

Until 2001, CPR's format was a mix of NPR programming and classical music. However, in 1999, CPR bought Denver classical music station KVOD, a prelude to providing both a 24-hour news format and a 24-hour classical format.

In 2001, CPR attempted to purchase the University of Northern Colorado's FM station KUNC in a closed-door deal with then-UNC president Hank Brown. When the pending deal was announced to the public, KUNC immediately raised over $1,000,000 in a week of emergency fundraising as a successful counteroffer to CPR's, thus ending CPR's plans to acquire the KUNC radio network.

In 2001, KCFC Boulder, KKPC Pueblo and KPRU on the Western Slope joined the CPR network. In 2004, CPR brought KVOV in Glenwood Springs on the air as part of its statewide network. In 2008, CPR's news service moved to 90.1 FM, and 88.1 FM carried CPR's classical service in Denver. In 2011, CPR launched the new-music station OpenAir on 1340 AM as KVOQ, and in 2015, OpenAir switched to broadcasting as KVOQ-FM on 102.3 FM in Denver/Boulder, and KVXQ (now Classical KVXO) on 88.3 FM in Fort Collins.

On January 17, 2020, CPR took over from Colorado College the management of KRCC, the primary NPR member station in Colorado Springs. While CPR will handle all operations, Colorado College will continue to hold the license and the station will still be operated from Colorado Springs. Initially, the station's format of NPR news during the day and adult album alternative music at night remained the same. However, the station's daytime schedule was tweaked slightly to match that of CPR's all-news network, and KRCC added CPR's daily statewide news program, "Colorado Matters." As part of the agreement, Colorado College and CPR will collaborate on a "public media center" that will be home to KRCC, the Colorado College Journalism Institute, and Rocky Mountain PBS' Regional Innovation Center. CPR had expanded to Southern Colorado in 2016 with the purchase of Manitou Springs-licensed AM station KXRE, but in April 2020 it switched that station to a simulcast of KVOQ.

In August 2023, CPR purchased a six story 72,000-square-foot building at 777 Grant Street to house its studios, offices and auditorium. The $8.34 million used to buy the property came from a donor. A few years prior CPR in December 2019 had relocated its 50 person newsroom to a 9,000 square space at 303 E. 17th Avenue.

In March 2024, CPR laid off 15 employees, none from the newsroom. The downsizing followed a period of staff increase at CPR, growing from 48 employees in 2006 to 214 in 2022.

== CPR News ==
CPR News includes a locally produced program called “Colorado Matters,” local newscasts throughout the day and national/international news from sources like NPR and the BBC. Over the years, Colorado Public Radio's newsroom has received a number of journalism awards, including RTNDA Edward R. Murrow Awards, Public Radio News Directors Incorporated (PRNDI) Awards and Colorado Broadcasters Association (CBA) Awards.

=== The Taxman ===
In 2017, CPR produced a three-part podcast broadcast on the radio entitled The Taxman. Produced by Rachel Estabrook, Nathaniel Minor, and Ben Markus, it gives the story about the Taxpayers Bill of Rights, or TABOR, in Colorado. It follows the man who created it, Douglas Bruce, and how it affected the state government. All three episodes were released on November 13, 2017, and narrated by Rachel Estabrook and Nathaniel Minor.

== Stations ==
CPR's full-power stations are split between three services. Seven broadcast NPR news and talk, five air classical music with hourly NPR news updates, and three air adult album alternative music.

*NOTE: Italics denote low-power translator stations. Many of the listed translators are owned by county cooperatives, and may change stations or frequencies with little notice. This listing does not include KRCC and its satellites, which are owned by Colorado College and managed by CPR.

Location	Frequency	Call sign	Format
Aspen	101.5 FM	K268BJ (KVOV)	Classical
Boulder	1490 AM	KCFC	News
Boulder	106.3 FM	K292GW (KCFC)	News
Boulder	99.9 FM	K260AL (KVOD)	Classical
Carbondale	90.5 FM	KVOV	Classical
Cortez	102.5 FM	K273AE (KVOD)	Classical
Craig	88.3 FM	KPYR	News
Delta	103.3 FM	KPRU	Classical
Denver	90.1 FM	KCFR-FM	News
Denver	88.1 FM	KVOD	Classical
Dove Creek	88.7 FM	K204DZ (KVOD)	Classical
Fort Collins	88.3 FM	KVXO	Classical
Fort Collins	90.9 FM	K215FM (KVOQ)	Indie 102.3
Glenwood Springs	100.1 FM	K261AI (KVOV)	Classical
Grand Junction	89.5 FM	KPRN	News
Greenwood Village (Denver)	102.3 FM	KVOQ	Indie 102.3
Gunnison	88.5 FM	K203BB (KPRN)	News
Gunnison	89.1 FM	K206BE (KVOD)	Classical
Manitou Springs (Colorado Springs)	1490 AM	KXRE	Indie 102.3
Manitou Springs (Colorado Springs)	102.1 FM	K271CK (KXRE)	Indie 102.3
Meeker	91.1 FM	K216BP (KPRN)	News
Montrose	88.3 FM	KPRH	News
Ouray	91.5 FM	K218BE (KPRN)	News
Parachute	88.3 FM	K202BI (KPRN)	News
Pueblo	91.9 FM	KCFP	Classical
Rangely	91.1 FM	K216BO (KPRN)	News
Old Snowmass	93.9 FM	K230AN (KVOV)	Classical
Thomasville	93.7 FM	K229AI (KVOV)	Classical
Vail	89.9 FM	KPRE	News
Vail	88.5 FM	KVQI	Indie 102.3
