= 2015 in radio =

The following is a list of events that affected radio broadcasting in 2015. Events listed include radio program debuts, finales, cancellations, station launches, closures and format changes, as well as information about controversies.

== Notable events ==
=== January ===
Date	Event
1	KTKT/Tucson flips from Spanish Sports to Spanish Adult Hits, simulcasting its recently signed-on FM translator sister station.
1	KKGQ/Wichita, Kansas, which began stunting in December 2014 after being purchased by local group Envision from Journal Broadcast Group as part of their merger with the E.W. Scripps Company, officially flipped to its permanent Rhythmic Hot AC format on this date, returning the format that aired on the same frequency from 2004-2007.
1	WZPW/Peoria changes its moniker from "Power 92.3" to "Peoria's 92.3," but keeps its Rhythmic Top 40 format intact.
1	WKCI-FM/New Haven's HD2 subchannel and FM translator debuts with a Classic Rock format, billed as "Rock 102."
1	WDVW/Jackson, Tennessee flips from Christian AC to Classic hits, changing its call letters to WHPP to match its "Hippie Radio 105.3" handle.
2	WROD & W284AV/Daytona Beach, Florida flips from Oldies to Classic Rock.
2	KKLS & K284BA/Rapid City drops Gold-based AC for Classic Hits.
2	After 22 years with the Oldies format using the Oldiez brand, WODZ-FM Rome, New York shifts to Classic Hits under the new brand "96.1 the Eagle," giving Utica-Rome its first Classic Hits station in 9 years.
2	WFNL-FM/Raleigh returns to the air with a Country format.
3	Jacksonville sister stations WSOS-FM and WMUV both drop their Classic Rock and Classic Country formats. Both outlets began simulcasting Christian AC WTRJ-FM, who will move its format to the two signals.
5	WHFS-FM/Tampa-St. Petersburg began a 24-hour continuous looping of Bubba the Love Sponge's program, and will serve as the flagship station and anchoring a morning slot. On February 2, the station changes call letters to WBRN-FM and launches a Rock-leaning Variety Hits format billed as "Bubba 98.7," which features music selected by Bubba himself and members of his morning show taking air shifts.
5	WZAX/Rocky Mount, North Carolina, which dropped Rhythmic Oldies in November 2014, flips to Classic Rock.
5	KMBZ and KMBZ-FM/Kansas City splits up their News/Talk simulcasts. The AM will focus on Conservative Talk and rebrand as "Talk 980," while the FM will focus on local News and Talk programming.
5	WKSA/Norfolk, which dropped its Urban AC format and began stunting with "Missy FM," featuring music from local native Missy Elliott (who is also doing the voice overs and imaging) on December 26, 2014, flipped to Classic Hip-Hop and relaunched its previous "92.1 The Beat" moniker that it ditched 13 years earlier.
5	After four months with Oldies, WVLZ/Knoxville returns to Sports.
5	WNUA/Chicago flips from Regional Mexican "El Patron" to Country branded as "Big 95.5".
5	KTWN-FM/Minneapolis-St. Paul shifts from adult album alternative to alternative as "Go 96.3".
5	Colorado Public Radio acquires ESPN Radio affiliate KDSP/Denver. The station will be converted to non-commercial status and become a simulcast of AM sister KVOQ's "Open Air" Adult Album Alternative format on January 27. The ESPN Radio format will continue to air on sister station KJAC/Fort Collins.
5	Salem Communications rebrands seven of its Conservative Talkers, WGUL/Tampa, WGKA/Atlanta, WLSS/Sarasota, Florida, WGTK/Louisville, KZNT/Colorado Springs, Colorado, KLFE/Seattle, and KCBQ/San Diego, to "The Answer" brand, bringing the number of Salem-owned outlets using the moniker to 27 stations.
6	Impact Media announces the acquisition of the 101.9 signal that is currently occupied by Regional Mexican KDBI/Boise from JLD Media, who back in December 2014 acquired Country KQBL/Mountain Home from Impact. As part of the arrangement, KDBI and KQBL will swap formats in February.
7	KWXS/Bend, Oregon transitions from Rhythmic Top 40 to Top 40/CHR as "107.7 The Beat."
7	KABC/Los Angeles makes a shift from Conservative Talk to a general interest Talk presentation as it replaced most of its political-driven shows with programs emphasizing lifestyles and local interests.
7	Saga Communications and A.C. Nielsen Co. reaches a deal that buries the hatchet between the two companies, which began back in 2012 when Nielsen's predecessor Arbitron sued Saga over using their data without permission at Saga's Milwaukee properties. As part of the settlement, Saga will allow its stations to be listed in Nielsen Audio's PPM ratings effective with the January 2014 book.
7	A formatic shakeup takes place in Quincy, Illinois, as KZZK shifts from Active Rock to Classic Rock, which they are picking up from sister station WQCY, who flipped to AC.
9	Albuquerque picks up its first R&B/Hip-Hop outlet, as K265CA, the FM translator of KZRR-HD2, adopts "The Beat" branding.
9	KHYL/Sacramento trades in its Rhythmic Contemporary format for Classic Hip-Hop.
9	CBS Sports Radio affiliate KGA/Spokane begins simulcasting programming from ESPN Radio affiliate KIRO/710: Seattle during the daytime hours with the exception of evenings and weekends.
9	WQTX/Lansing, Michigan drops Country and returns to its previous Sports format that it carried from 2004 to 2006.
12	WZMR/Altamont, New York flips from Adult Album Alternative after two years to Sports as "Win 104.9," picking up the CBS Sports Radio affiliation from WPTR, who will affiliate with NBC Sports Radio. This brings the number of Sports outlets in the Albany-Schenectady-Troy market to four, joining WPTR, Fox Sports Radio affiliate WOFX and ESPN Radio affiliate WTMM-FM.
12	Cumulus Media begins syndication of the Nash Icon Country format through co-owned Westwood One to non-Cumulus-owned outlets, with the signing of its first affiliate, former Alternative WRYD/Ocean City, Maryland.
12	After leaving a message that "Bob" was "leaving town," "selling the station," and "selling off the 80s library" to sister station KKLZ, KVGS/Las Vegas brings the Adult Top 40 format and "Star" brand back to the market eight years after it was dropped by its sister station at 102.7.
15	Although they were awaiting approval from the United States Department of Justice (which would clear them of any anti-trust laws or issues that would hold up the sale), Entercom postponed a Time Brokerage Agreement on the 14 stations that they are acquiring from the Lincoln Financial Group until an issue involving one of the Lincoln Financial stations that Entercom is spinning off to comply with FCC rules because of market ownership limits, KKFN/Denver, to the Pikes Peaks Trust (who in turn will spin off the Sports outlet to a third party), is resolved. Entercom has refiled new paperwork for the sale, which is expected to be approved by the FCC.
16	KBSO/Corpus Christi transitions from Country to Texas-focused Country music as "94.7 The Rig."
19	Salem Communications rebrands two of its Christian Talk stations, WMCA/New York City and KKMS/Minneapolis-St. Paul, as "The Mission."
20	After stunting with a looping of the Brass Bonanza song that was used as the theme song for the former NHL team The Hartford Whalers, WDRC-FM/Hartford flipped from Classic Hits to Classic Rock as "102.9 The Whale," filling the void left by WCCC-FM in 2014.
26	Classic Hip-Hop WRWM/Indianapolis drops the "i94" moniker and rebrands as "93.9 The Beat" to better reflect its current format.
26	WLFW/Evansville shifts from Country to Classic Country as "93.5 The Duke."
30	St. Louis picks up its third Top 40 outlet, as KIHT flips from Classic Hits to Mainstream CHR as "Now 96.3."
30	CJKR-FM/Winnipeg shifts from Active Rock as "Power 97" to Classic Rock/Classic Hits as "Big 97.5."
30	The Mark Levin Show signs a five-year contract extension with Westwood One.
30	After spending only three months with a Classic Hits format, WGHL/Louisville becomes the latest outlet to make the flip to Classic Hip-Hop as "Old School 105.1."

=== February ===
Date	Event
2	The Columbia Basin region of Washington and Oregon picks its fourth Top 40/CHR, as KWVN-FM: Pendleton/Walla Walla drops Variety Hits to become "107.7 Hot FM." (Iincidentally it is the second station in the area to use the "Hot" moniker, as it is also used at Rhythmic Top 40 KOLW/Basin City, which covers the Richland-Pasco-Kennewick area).
3	After a nearly 20-year run, 18 of them as morning host, Kurt "Big Boy" Alexander exits Rhythmic Top 40 KPWR/Los Angeles after negotiations between the two parties broke down, leading KPWR owner Emmis Communications to file a lawsuit to keep him from taking a $3.5 million offer from iHeartMedia, who three days earlier registered a domain and social media accounts for Rhythmic Oldies rival KHHT, who announced that they will flip back to R&B/Hip-Hop as "Real 92.3" on February 6. The move brings the format back to the market for the first time since 2006, when Radio One dropped the urban format at 100.3 FM KKBT, which initially started at 92.3 FM in 1989 before moving to 100.3 FM in 2000 as part of a format/frequency swap with iheart's predecessor Clear Channel and Radio One resulting from Clear Channel and AMFM, Inc.'s merger.
11	San Antonio picks up its first Alternative outlet, as Alpha Media debuts an FM translator at 103.3 and at KTFM-HD2, billed as "103.3 The App."
12	After five years as a Rhythmic Top 40, KQIE/Riverside-San Bernardino flipped to Rhythmic AC as "Old School 104.7," filling the void in the Inland Empire after the departures of KHHT/Los Angeles six days earlier and KDEY-FM's return to a simulcast of KDAY/Redondo Beach in 2010.
13	Canadian broadcasters Corus Radio and Rogers Media ups the ante with the rebranding of their AC and Adult Top 40 outlets. Rogers expanded the "Kiss" branding to Winnipeg's CKY-FM, which was topped an hour later by Corus's relaunching of crosstown rival CJGV-FM (and sister stations CKNG-FM/Edmonton, CING-FM/Hamilton, CKRU-FM/Peterborough, CFHK-FM/London, CKWS-FM/Kingston, and CFLG-FM/Cornwall) to the "Fresh FM" moniker. In addition to the changes, Corus also shifts CKWS-FM's sister station CFMK-FM from Classic Rock to Mainstream Rock.
20	oWOW Radio, an Internet radio station broadcasting an adult album alternative format, launches in Cleveland, Ohio. Programmer John Gorman, best known for years at rock station WMMS/Cleveland, serves as chief content officer.
23	Rival Vancouver Top 40/CHR stations CFBT-FM and CFUN-FM (and its Chilliwack and Abbottsford simulcasts) both rebrand their stations. CFUN drops "Sonic" for "Kiss FM", while CFBT-FM will drop "The Beat" on March 5 and bring back the "Virgin Radio" branding that was used at former Bell Media Adult Top 40 station CKZZ-FM until March 2014. Meanwhile, across the Georgia Strait in Victoria, The Jack format make its exit from CHTT-FM, which flips to Top 40/CHR as "Kiss 103.1."
26	Educational Media Foundation announces the acquisition of Classic Hits KMCQ/Seattle, which will become a K-Love outlet after the sale closes.
27	After eight years with Adult Hits, WGTZ/Dayton flipped to AC as "Soft Rock 92.9", bringing the format back to the market after three years.
27	WKIM/Memphis drops their struggling Conservative Talk format for Classic Hip-Hop as "98.9 The Vibe." The flip puts them in direct competition with WIVG, who flipped to the same format in December 2014.
27	Jon Colwell joins WLZD-LP with Flashback Fridays, his first radio show since Flashback In 60 Minutes was pulled from WKCB-FM in November 2012.
28	2MCR/Campbelltown, New South Wales' weekly program Saturday Night Live will celebrate its 100th podcast with a special edition with a world record attempt for a record number of animal noises within a two-hour radio broadcast.

=== March ===
Date	Event
2	Springfield, Missouri outlets KBFL and KBFL-FM (both licensed to Buffalo) will make changes, with the AM dropping Smooth Jazz and take the Adult Standards format from the FM, who in turn will flip to a hybrid Southern Country/Rock format as "99.9 The Outlaw".
2	'80s-centric AC WILV/Chicago shifts to current-based AC as "She 100.3" and changes calls to WSHE-FM.
2	KOSO/Modesto, California drops the "Radio 92.9" handle and brings back the former "B93" moniker it dropped back in 2012
4	WQSH/Albany drops Adult Top 40 for Christmas music, a stunt that lasts one week before the station reverts to adult hits as “Rewind 105.7” on March 12.
5	KJZN/Fresno drops CBS Sports Radio for Classic Hip-Hop
6	Erie, Pennsylvania picks up its first Classic Hip-Hop outlet (and its first Urban or Rhythmic-formatted station) in the market as the HD2 subchannel and FM translator of WXKC drops Top 40/CHR to become "104.3 The Vibe."
7	WOMG/Columbia, South Carolina adjusts its Country direction from Nash FM to Nash Icon in order to attract 25-plus listeners.
11	With the acquisitions of former Radio Disney outlets WDDZ/Pittsburgh, WDYZ/Orlando and WDWD/Atlanta, Salem announces that the three stations will flip formats after the sale is approved by the FCC.
15	Just one day before it was supposed to debut, Red Zebra Broadcasting canceled plans to launch The Man Cave morning show on ESPN Radio affiliate WTEM/Washington, D.C. and its simulcasting sister stations due to hired host Jason Reid's criticism of the Washington Redskins during his tenure at The Washington Post, prompting unknown sources who work for the NFL franchise to have it pulled before the March 16 premiere; both the Redskins and Red Zebra are owned by Daniel Snyder, who has been under fire over the team's name, which critics, groups and media entities see as racist. After receiving a lot of pressure from the media, Red Zebra changed course and announced that it would debut The Man Cave on March 30 instead.
16	WVIC/Lansing, Michigan flips from Alternative to Classic Country, adopting parent company Midwest Communications' "The Duke" branding. At the same time, Classic Hits sister WLMI has begun a transition to AC. Midwest also expands "The Duke" branding in Green Bay, as WZDR goes from a simulcast of Classic Hits WYDR to a simulcast of WGEE-FM.
16	iHeartMedia's Sports KLAC/Los Angeles rebrands as "AM 570 LA Sports," using the logo and color of the Los Angeles Dodgers, who became co-owners of the station in a partnership deal.
17	Alpha Media expands into Lubbock, Texas with the purchase of Wilks Broadcasting's four-station cluster.
17	Salem announces that it has entered a LMA deal with Crain Communications that will take over the programming of Conservative Talk KHTE-FM/Little Rock, which will rebrand as "The Answer."
19	Educational Media Foundation announces the purchase of KXMG/New Orleans, who became a K-Love station on March 16 after its former owner dropped the Regional Mexican format after four years.
20	After six years as a Classic Rocker, KBRU/Oklahoma City transitions to Active Rock.
23	A pair of Cumulus Media Country outlets, WNSH/New York City and KSCS/Dallas-Ft. Worth, attract the attention of music trades as they tweak their current formats to include non-Country artists in an effort to attract listeners away from their contemporary music rivals and to boost their ratings.

=== April ===
Date	Event
1	Jim Quinn is scheduled to return to radio for the first time since the cancellation of The War Room with Quinn and Rose in November 2013. The new show, Quinn in the Morning, will originate at WYSL/Avon, New York, with the terms of syndication still being negotiated.
1	New owners Delmarva Broadcasting flipped WJKS/Wilmington, Delaware from R&B/Hip-Hop (after an 18-year run) to a simulcast of News/Talk WDEL. Its callsign was then changed to WDEL-FM on the next day, removing any instances of its former "Kiss" branding and format.
1	WLDB/Milwaukee transitions from AC to Adult Top 40 as "93.3 Trending Radio."
1	Top 40/CHR KIIS-FM/Los Angeles is named the top billing radio station in the United States by BIA/Kelsey.
10	Top 40/CHR WRDW-FM/Philadelphia rebrands from "Wired 96.5" to "96.5 AMP Radio," putting it in line with parent owner CBS Radio's "AMP" branding.
15	Fox Sports Radio affiliate KREL/Colorado Springs switched formats to what is billed as the first full-time Talk station in the United States devoted to the issue of Marijuana, and changes its call letters to KHIG to match its moniker "K-HIGH 1580." The station would later flip formats again on May 15, when it was LMA'd and became a simulcast of KFEZ after the owner of KHIG died on April 24 and per his request to sell off his properties upon his death.
16	After nearly 15 months with lite AC, CKUE-FM Windsor, Ontario abandons that format and the Lite FM branding and flipped to Variety hits as "Cool FM".
17	After four years as a Mainstream Top 40, KPLV/Las Vegas returned to Rhythmic Top 40 with a Dance lean and along with it, revived the "93.1 The Party" moniker and branding.
20	KBBY-FM/Oxnard-Ventura shifts from Adult Top 40 to AC.
20	After eight years as a Rhythmic AC, WYEZ/Myrtle Beach, South Carolina flips to AC as "94.5 The Tide." The move also results in the station becoming the eighth outlet to drop the "Movin'" branding.
23	WKLH/Milwaukee adjusts its Classic Rock presentation to focus on '80s music and rebrands as "Milwaukee's Hometown Rock."

=== May ===
Date	Event
4	CHRY-FM/Toronto flips from a Community-focused format to Urban Alternative (a mix of R&B, Electronica, Soca, Reggae, Remixes and Hip-Hop), a first of its kind in North America.
4	The FCC issues a Declaratory Ruling approving Pandora's argument to allow it to purchase Adult Top 40 KXMZ/Rapid City, South Dakota from Connoisseur Media after nearly two years of holdups. However, Pandora must obtain prior Commission approval for the following which they must submit within 90 days before the approval is granted: They must aggregate foreign equity and/or foreign voting interests in Pandora Media exceeding 49.99 percent, any change in the Pandora Media Board of Directors that would result in a majority of foreign members, or any individual foreign investor or “group” acquiring a greater than five percent voting or equity interest (or ten percent for certain institutional investors), and modify its certificate of incorporation, bylaws, or other appropriate organizational documents.
4	KMJE & KMJE-FM/Sacramento drops Spanish Adult Hits for Spanish Top 40 as "Vive 92.1," utilizing the airstaff that exited rival KLMG on the same day as the launch
14	WROZ/Lancaster transitions from AC to Adult Top 40 as "Fun 101.3"
15	WAY-FM Network acquires Christian Rock KVRK/Dallas-Ft. Worth from Research Education Foundation. The station will flip to WAY-FM's Christian AC network after the sale closes.
15	CHAY-FM, Barrie rebrands to "93.1 Fresh Radio" becoming the eighth Corus radio station to adopt the "Fresh Radio" moniker. The station's format remains Hot AC.
18	Alpha Media acquires Morris Communications' 36 radio stations, expanding its portfolio to Alaska, Washington, California, Kansas, and Texas.
19	After failing to come to terms of a new deal, Entercom Conservative Talk WRKO announces that it is dropping Rush Limbaugh from the lineup (this is the second time in the station's history that his show was dropped; the first was when rival WXKS stole the program away in 2010 but returned in 2012 after WXKS flipped formats). They are the second outlet in the top 50 market to drop his program, following WIBC/Indianapolis' announcement in April that it will no longer air his show in July.
19	The FCC levies a $1,000,000 fine on iHeart Media for triggering an Emergency Alert System test during an October 26, 2014 broadcast of the syndicated Bobby Bones Show, which came from a YouTube clip that was posted on November 9, 2011. The test caused stations that carried his show, including flagship station WSIX-FM/Nashville, to send out alerts, which attracted the attention of FEMA, who immediately sent out a statement that the test can only be done by radio and television stations.
22	After three years as a Top 40/CHR, KSZR/Tucson flips to Classic Hip-Hop as "97.5 The Vibe," which also coincides with the launch of Cumulus Media's syndicated Classic Hip-Hop format.
22	After 17 months as an Alternative, WVBZ/Greensboro flips to Active Rock with an emphasis on targeting male listeners.
29	The third ABU Radio Song Festival is held, at Yangon, Myanmar, organised by the Asia-Pacific Broadcasting Union.
29	iHeart Media adds two more stations to its portfolio with the purchase of Radio Disney outlets KWDZ/Salt Lake City and WRDZ-FM/Indianapolis.
29	After seven years of Variety Hits, WLWK/Milwaukee flips to Country and revives the WKTI calls and "94.5 KTI" brand that was used for its previous Top 40/CHR and Adult Top 40 formats from 1974 to 2008. The Scripps-owned station joins an increasing field of Country outlets in the Milwaukee market as they take on WMIL-FM, WMBZ and WMKQ. However, just six hours after the flip, WMKQ immediately dropped its Country format and picked up WKTI's displaced Variety Hits direction and "The Lake" branding. But on June 2, 2015, it was reported that Scripps did not authorize Magnum to use "The Lake" format and branding, since Scripps still owns the branding and began using it on its HD3 sub channel, which led Scripps to take legal action against Magnum, who confirmed that they were contacted by Scripps' lawyers, but so far there has been no comment from Scripps confirming this claim.
31	CFRK-FM/Fredericton, New Brunswick drops Top 40/CHR for Country, giving the market its first FM Country outlet in 15 years as well as a new competitor for rival station CKHJ, which also happens to be the remaining AM station left in the market.

=== June ===
Date	Event
1	Fox Sports Radio will return to the Spokane market after being dropped in April by KZFS when it flipped to Christian Contemporary, as Classic Country KJRB becomes the new affiliate.
1	Just one month after KHIG/Colorado Springs flipped formats, KDCO & K231BQ/Denver drops the Sports format for a Marijuana-themed Rock presentation, billed as "Smokin' 94.1." They are the second outlet in Denver (and the third in Colorado, where medicinal marijuana is legal) to air a "Pot Rock"-type format, which was last tried briefly at KFCO in November 2012.
2	Entravision expands its Spanish Top 40 "Super Estrella" brand to three more co-owned stations: Regional Mexican KRRN/Las Vegas, Spanish AC KMXA/Denver, and Spanish AC simulcasts KCVR & KCVR-FM/Stockton-Modesto, California. In addition to the flip, Entravision also expands its Los Angeles-based LM Show to the company's nine stations, including its Spanish Adult Hits "Jose" outlets.
7	More than 61 people were arrested and 10 New Jersey State Police troopers were injured after a fight over tickets and crowd capacity overshadows WQHT/New York City's annual "Hot 97 Summer Jam" that was already in progress and being held at MetLife Stadium in East Rutherford, New Jersey. The sold-out event also caused confusion among the ticket goers who were denied entry, which added to the rioted melee. The following day (June 8), WQHT addresses the issue on its morning show and plans to refund the customers who could not get into the event, while the American Civil Liberties Union's New Jersey chapter called for the state Attorney General's office to investigate if any violations were reported.
23	The Chicago White Sox announced that effective with 2016 season that its broadcasts will move from WSCR to WLS in a six-year deal. The move would pave the way for CBS Radio to move its Chicago Cubs broadcasts from WBBM to WSCR as per clause agreement should the White Sox switch stations. On July 16, the co-owned NBA's Chicago Bulls was added to the deal, where it will move from WMVP to WLS for the 2016-17 season.
24	Classical South Florida, a subsidiary of American Public Media, announced a board meeting to vote on a deal to sell its Classical outlets in Miami (WKCP), West Palm Beach (WPBI and News/Talk W270AD) and Fort Myers (WNPS) to EMF (who would convert them to K-LOVE stations), while looking for a new suitor to help retain their formats after the sale.
25	Three on-air hosts at KLZ/Denver, Randy Corporon, Ken Clark, and Kris Cook, turn in their resignations (a 30-day notice) after they became furious over a decision made by station management to pull an interview with former Colorado Congressman Tom Tancredo that was made on Corporon's morning show on June 18 because of a request by General Manager Don Crawford, Jr. to halt Tancredo's appearances until he could meet with him about Tancredo's involvement in a scandal surrounding the Colorado Republican Party and its chairman Steve House, who claims that Tancredo, who had backed House for the chairmanship, wants him to resign over claims of being a womanizer and unfit to be a leader, which House has denied.
29	WKOX/Everett-Boston, Massachusetts drops Spanish variety for network talk from Premiere Networks and Fox Sports Radio. The move revives a branding and lineup previously heard on sister station WXKS 1200 from 2010 to 2012.
30	Chris Thile is named the next host of A Prairie Home Companion. Thile will rotate hosting duties for most of the show's 2015–16 season with founder Garrison Keillor before taking over full-time in 2016; with the change will come a change in focus as music becomes more prominent and the show's rural old-time radio trappings are de-emphasized.

=== July ===
Date	Event
10	The Official Chart on BBC Radio 1 moves to Friday afternoons at 4pm during Greg James's show to coincide with the global change of new music releases from Sundays to Fridays. It is the first time in 28 years that The Official Chart has taken place on a day other than a Sunday.
10	The global change in the move of new releases on Friday also affects the changes in Billboard, resulting in the Hot 100 chart to adjust the real-time monitoring of songs receiving airplay at radio stations in the United States by synching up to that Monday to Sunday period after formerly encompassing each Wednesday to Tuesday due to the Hot 100 now following a Friday to Thursday cycle.
14	As part of a $5 million (USD) settlement it made with the United States Department of Justice, Entercom agrees to swap four of its Denver properties, KYGO-FM, KOSI, KKFN, and KEPN, to Bonneville International in exchange for Bonneville's KSWD/Los Angeles. The swap brings Entercom to Los Angeles for the first time, while Bonneville marks its maiden entry into the Denver market. The swaps become official July 17.
15	KFLY/Eugene, Oregon fires their entire airstaff. The station flips from Active Rock to Triple-A on July 30.
17	After 12 years airing Radio Disney, WRDZ-FM/Indianapolis, with new owner (iHeartMedia) and now called WUBG, flips to Country.
24	ESPN officially terminates Colin Cowherd after he made negative comments about Dominican Republic baseball players on his radio program, which was condemned by Major League Baseball and the players association. Ironically, Cowherd was expected to leave ESPN at the end of the year, but decided to expedite the departure immediately. His last show will air July 31.

=== August ===
Date	Event
1	CFCW/Camrose, Alberta moves from 790 kHz up the dial to 840 kHz.
3	KZZE/Medford, Oregon flips from Rock to AAA as "106.3 The Valley", with a callsign change to KYVL to follow.
4	The Santa Fe, New Mexico radio market sees a pair of FM outlets swap frequencies, owners, and a format flip. Hutton Broadcasting moves Spanish Adult Hits KLBU from 102.9 to 94.7 in a swapping deal with American General Media, who in turn moves their simulcast of Regional Mexican KLVO/Belen-Albuquerque to the 102.9 signal and takes the new calls KSFE. After the swap was completed, KLBU flipped to Rhythmic Hot AC as "Jam'n 94.7."
4	Alpha Media expands its radio portfolio with the acquisition of the 116 stations owned by Digity. Owner Dean Goodman had wanted to keep the stations rather than selling them, but the investors opted to divest their stake in the company, thus resulting in the sale.
7	Active Rock KAAZ-FM/Salt Lake City, currently at 106.5, will debut on a new frequency at 106.7 MHz. The move is part of a frequency realignment involving FM signals in the Salt Lake City market.
11	KVIT/Phoenix moves its Dance format from 90.7 to a newly launched signal at 88.7, which signs on as KPNG.
12	KHLR/Little Rock drops Rhythmic AC for Country, giving rivals KSSN and KMJX new competition in the Arkansas Capital City.
14	The trimulcasts of Minneapolis-St. Paul Sports Talkers WGVX/WRXP/WGVZ flips to Classic Hip-Hop as "105 The Vibe," which puts it into direct competition with KTCZ-HD3 & K273BH, who launched their format in June.
14	Radio One breaks up the simulcast of Charlotte Gospel outlets WPZS and WQNC, with WPZS (at 92.7) swapping calls with WQNC (at 100.9), then flips the 92.7 portion to a stunting of "Drake 92.7," playing non-stop music from Canadian rapper/actor Drake (and sparking rumored tweets that he bought the station, which he cannot do legally because he was born in Canada even though his father is American). The station flipped back to R&B/Hip-Hop after the stunting as "92.7 The Block," which was WQNC's previous format from 2001 to 2004 (as WCHH), when it shifted to Adult R&B.
21	The Alternative format enters two markets, with WAXY-FM/Miami dropping the Sports simulcasts of its AM sister to become "104.3 the Shark," bringing the format back to South Florida after a 10-year absence, While in the Quad Cities the HD2 sub channel of WLLR-FM is launched as "Alt 104.5."
24	Bell Media Radio's network of francophone contemporary hit radio stations in the Canadian province of Quebec rebrands itself from NRJ to Énergie.
25	After eight months with Rhythmic oldies, WZTI/Milwaukee flips to Oldies.
27	WMTI/New Orleans becomes the second Cumulus Media Sports outlet to flip formats, as it brings the Alternative format back to the market for the first time since sister station WRKN flipped to Country in 2013 (and to the same 106.1 frequency, when it was "Zephyr 106.1" from 1992 to 1997) as "106.1 The Underground," and has applied for the WZRH calls that was used during its first incarnation.
28	KHLT-FM/Wichita returns to Regional Mexican under its former owner after a two-year stint with AC and a new owner.
28	CFMK-FM/Kingston, Ontario drops Mainstream Rock for Classic Rock/Classic Hits as "Big 96.3."

=== September ===
Date	Event
1	All remaining stations broadcasting on 87.7 MHz (technically low-power TV stations operating primarily audio programming on analog channel 6) were originally required to cease operations. However, the FCC has announced that the cutoff date has been postponed indefinitely.
1	A major frequency shakeup takes place in Pueblo, Colorado which sees KFVR-FM's Country format moving to KJQY, dropping its AC format and paving the way for KFVR to flip to Classic Hip-Hop, KFEZ dropping Shopping for ESPN Radio, and KCBR shifting from Variety Hits to adopting the same identical oldies direction as its Colorado Springs sister KWRP.
2	CJWV-FM in Peterborough, Ontario flips to oldies branded as "Oldies 96.7"
3	CKHZ-FM/Halifax, Nova Scotia abruptly flips format from Adult Top 40 to Country, giving the market its second country outlet as they take on new rival station CHFX-FM.
4	After five years as a news/talk simulcast of its AM sister, CBS Radio flips KXNT-FM/Las Vegas to Rhythmic Hot AC as "Q100.5." Billing itself as "Today's Rhythm & All The Best Old School," the station is positioned between sister stations KMXB and KLUC-FM (which shifted back towards Rhythmic Top 40 after spending nearly two years in Mainstream Top 40) in targeting a 25-49 audience while trying to upstage another upstart that also debuted the same day, KPLV-HD2 & K280DD, who launched a R&B/Hip-Hop format billed as "Real 103.9" to serve as a flanker for KPLV and to draw listeners away from KLUC and KVEG. In addition KXNT will also have competition against another Rhythmic AC outlet, KOAS-FM. The first song KXNT played as "Q100.5" was "This Is How We Do It" by Montell Jordan.
4	Cumulus Media pulls the plug on both Alternative KHTB and Variety Hits KENZ Salt Lake City, with KHTB simulcasting KENZ, which will pave the way for KENZ's return to Modern Rock after two years as "ALT 101.9", while KHTB will become the latest station to adopt the Classic Hip-Hop "Vibe" format and branding.
4	After only a year with Classic Rock, WROO/Greenville, South Carolina repositions its direction to 80s/90s Rock as "Real Rock 104.9."
4	The Alternative format returned to Birmingham after nine years as WQEN-HD3 & W235BS drops Classic Rock to become "Alt 94.9."
4	CHUP-FM/Calgary shifts from Adult Hits to AC as "Soft Rock 97.7," filling the void left by Adult Top 40 station CHFM-FM in December 2013.
4	The Rhythmic AC format exits Corpus Christi, as KKBA flips to Mainstream Rock as "Rock 92.7."
7	CKOC/Hamilton, Ontario flips from classic hits/oldies to sports talk as the station begins a joint agreement with TSN Radio and the Hamilton Tiger-Cats. The format change, announced months in advance, coincides with the Tiger-Cats' playing the Labour Day Classic.
11	WXJZ/Gainesville dropped its Dance format after three years and began stunting with songs with patriotic themes. The station would return to its previous identity as "Smooth 100.9," this time as a Soft AC.
14	Gray Television announces that it will acquire Schurz Communications in a $442.5 million deal that will see Gray expand its portfolio to 49 television stations in 28 states, and also expand to Gray's first entry into radio with the addition of Schurz's radio properties in South Bend and Lafayette, Indiana, and Rapid City, South Dakota. However, on November 2, Gray announced that it would spin off the radio stations to separate companies: The South Bend cluster to Mid-West Family Broadcasting, the Lafayette properties to Neuhoff Communications, and the Rapid City outlets to HomeSlice Media Group.
15	Salem Media acquires the five remaining Radio Disney stations in St. Louis, St. Petersburg-Tampa, Denver, Minneapolis-St. Paul, and Portland, Oregon. The sale marks the departure from terrestrial radio for The Walt Disney Company's teen-focused Top 40 radio network (except for KDIS/Los Angeles, which continues with the format). Salem in turn will spin off the properties to comply with FCC ownership rules. The last of the 5, KDIZ ended the Radio Disney format on December 16, 2015.
16	Boston picks up its fourth Conservative Talker as Business Talk WBIX relaunches as "AM 1260 The Buzz."
17	The University of Virginia in Charlottesville announces the flip of the market's only R&B/Hip-Hop outlet (and its commercially student-run station), WUVA, to Country, utilizing Nash Icon programming.
18	Yakima, Washington picks up a Rhythmic oldies outlet, as the FM simulcast of News/Talk KIT becomes "Mega 99.3" and switched calls to KMGW.
21	KDWZ/Duluth-Superior's five-year run as a Top 40/CHR will come to an end as parent owner Midwest Communications flips the station to Classic Country and adopts "The Duke" brand. The flip also leaves the Twin Ports again without a Top 40 outlet.
24	Northern Lights Broadcasting adds another FM outlet in Minneapolis-St. Paul, as they acquire KNOF from Praise FM in a deal that will see the Christian contemporary format moving to KTWN's HD2 sub channel along with a five-year deal to sponsor a "Faith Night" during the Minnesota Twins baseball season and to use Target Field for Praise FM's annual concerts in 2016 and 2017. Northern Lights will flip the new acquisition to a new format after the sale closes.
25	Nielsen Audio launches an investigation into allegations of fraudulent and inappropriate conduct/contact between Active Rock WBRN-FM/Tampa-St.Petersburg morning man Bubba The Love Sponge and at least one PPM household. The radio host and station management has agreed to co-operate to resolve the issue.
25	WENN/Birmingham, Alabama begins stunting with Christmas music, becoming the first station in the United States to adopt the format permanently for the 2015 season.
28	Compass Media sells KPRI/Encinitas-San Diego to EMF, who immediately takes over under a LMA. The station's 22-year run with adult album alternative will come to an end in January 2016, when KPRI becomes a K-LOVE affiliate.
28	The Toronto Maple Leafs announced that it is no longer sending its radio hosts to do away games, with the announcers doing the play by play off television from the team's home market, a move that has sparked outrage from the fans of the NHL franchise.
29	Univision's Albuquerque outlets, Rhythmic AC KKRG and Regional Mexican KJFA, trades frequencies, with KKRG going from 101.3 to 105.1, while KJFA going the opposite direction. Both outlets will retain their current formats.

=== October ===
Date	Event
2	After three years as Rhythmic Oldies, KJHM/Denver shifts its direction to a Rhythmic Hot AC approach with more emphasis on current Rhythmic pop product and recurrents from the 1990s and 2000s, using the new moniker and slogan "Jammin' 101.5, The Next Generation."
2	Just one month after transitioning from Rhythmic Top 40 to satellite-fed Urban AC, KBHT/Waco, Texas is officially relaunched as "Magic 104.9," utilizing a local Urban AC presentation. Ten days later on October 14, its HD3 sub channel (which previously simulcasted ESPN Radio from AM sister KRZI) flipped to Rhythmic Hot AC as "Jammin' 104.5"
5	Cumulus Media pulls the plug on Conservative Talk KWQW/Des Moines, as it flips to Classic Hip-Hop as "98.3 The Vibe." The flip adds to an ongoing series of constant frequency shakeups and translator launches in the Iowa State Capitol, which saw Saga Communications' KRNT flip to ESPN Radio and move its Adult Standards format to KAZR-HD2 & K283CC on September 10, which was followed by the debut of Classic Country sister KSTZ-HD2 & K299CC on September 23.
7	Just one day after former U.S. Olympic softball star Jessica Mendoza became the first woman to serve as color analyst for a Major League Baseball postseason game as a member of the broadcast team for ESPN's coverage of the American League Wild Card Game, which sees the Houston Astros shut out the New York Yankees, 3-0, at Yankee Stadium, Mike Bell, the afternoon co-host at CBS Radio's Atlanta Sports outlet WZGC, is immediately suspended for three days after he made a series of Twitter rants in which he slammed ESPN for not hiring a sportscaster with professional baseball credentials to do the play by play and questioned Mendoza's qualifications to actually do a baseball telecast, which was also condemned by the Atlanta Falcons, who happens to be WZGC's flagship station.
7	Cumulus Media expands the Classic Hip-Hop "The Vibe" branding to Reno, as AC KNEV becomes the latest convert.
7	CFMJ/Toronto becomes the first station in Canada to launch a HD Radio subchannel, as it debuts a HD2 simulcast of its News/Talk format on its Adult Top 40 sister CING-FM/Hamilton.
12	Kroenke Sports Enterprises, owned by Altitude Sports and Entertainment founder Stan Kroenke, acquires Wilks Broadcasting's Denver properties, Country KWOF, Adult Top 40 KIMN, and Oldies KXKL-FM. When the sale is approved by the FCC, KSE is expected to flip one of the three outlets to Sports, which could see the Denver Nuggets, Colorado Avalanche, and Colorado Rapids moving from its current home in Denver, which is KKFN.
16	Cumulus Media fires WYAY/Atlanta morning host Steve McCoy upon learning that an interview that McCoy claimed to have made with businessman-turned-Presidential candidate Donald Trump that aired on his morning program on October 14 was recycled using older material from previous interviews, after members of Trump's staff confirmed to the management at the News/Talk outlet that no interview took place; McCoy has apologized for deceiving the station and its listeners.
16	After Centenary College in Hackettstown, New Jersey sold its broadcasting license for WNTI-FM to the University of Pennsylvania, programming from the Philadelphia station WXPN programming began broadcasting in Northern New Jersey under the new call-letters WXPJ.
19	After 25 years as a morning co-host to both Rick Dees and successor Ryan Seacrest at Top 40/CHR KIIS-FM/Los Angeles, Ellen K took over the morning time slot at AC sister station KOST-FM, succeeding Mark Wallengren, who spent 30 years in the morning position, has moved to afternoons.
20	Univision Radio makes a series of cutbacks at their outlets. In San Antonio, Xavier Garcia and Biggie Paul are let go as morning hosts after 12 years at Rhythmic Top 40 KBBT (which also results in their morning show "Xavier's World" also dropped from sister station KVVF-KVVZ/San Jose-San Francisco), while 23-year veteran Jonny Ramierez is let go from Tejano sister KXTN-FM. In New York City, Spanish Top 40 WXNY-FM pulls the plug on the morning show "El Manicomio" after 10 months in favor of going jockless in the time slot.
21	After two years with Conservative Talk, WNFZ/Knoxville returns to its previous Alternative format, reviving the "94Z" moniker.
30	After five months with Pot Rock and due to owner Marc Paskin's health issues, KBUD/Denver dropped the format from the FM translator at 94.1 (K231BQ), which was sold to iHeart Media and became a simulcast of News/Talk KOA and KBCO-HD3, with KPTT's translator in Boulder (K231AA) added to the simulcast. The move also sees KOA's former HD home at 103.5 and FM translator at 107.9 (K300CP) flip to Christmas Music until a new format is introduced. The AM will continue with the Pot Rock format until its sale to another party.

=== November ===
Date	Event
1	KHKN/Little Rock drops Variety Hits for Christmas Music. The station flipped to Classic Hits as "Big 94.9" December 28.
2	Due to the overwhelming response of the Southern Rock/Country format in the Springfield and Ozarks region, Meyer Communications moved "The Outlaw" from KBFL-FM to sister station KTXR, replacing KTXR's AC format. KBFL flipped to Adult Standards the same day.
2	Kansas City picks up its second Alternative, as KCMO-FM HD2 & K273BZ becomes the first Cumulus Media outlet to drop the Nash Icon Country brand to become "102.5 The Underground."
4	Wilks Broadcasting officially exits the broadcasting business, as they first sell off WLVQ/Columbus to Saga Communications, giving the latter its fifth FM property in the Ohio State Capitol. This would be followed by the sale of Sports WZOH-FM and Country WHOK-FM to Radio One on November 11. Radio One immediately flipped WZOH to Adult R&B and moved the format from WXMG. WXMG flipped to Classic Hip-Hop as "Boom 106.3" while WHOK-FM switched to Gospel as "Joy 107.1" on November 16.
11	After a four-month transition from Top 40/CHR (lasting two years, and low ratings), along with a dismissal of airstaffers and its PD, Cumulus announced that WRQX/Washington, D.C. will revert to its "Mix 107.3" branding and Hot AC format on November 13 with the return of former morning host Jack Diamond.
12	The University of Washington announced that it acquiring Jazz-formatted KPLU-FM/Tacoma-Seattle from Pacific Lutheran University for $7 million, with an additional $1 million in underwriting fees. When the deal is approved by the FCC, KPLU's NPR programming will be dropped as the network's shows overlaps with News/Talk KUOW's schedule, allowing KPLU to go Jazz full-time.
19	In a surprise move, iHeartMedia's Active Rock KLOU-HD2 & W279AQ/St. Louis switched formats to Christmas music, bypassing the annual tradition of substituting for KLOU's main Classic Hits programming. The FM translator flipped to Christian Hits as "Up! 103.7" on December 28.
23	A shakeup affects the Cumulus Oklahoma City cluster, with KQOB ending a four-month run with Classic Rock (after having evolved out of Adult Hits) to start stunting with Christmas music; it relaunched with Classic Hits as "Fun 96.9" December 28. It also announced that it is also shuffling its morning shows, with Adult Top 40 KYIS' Jack Elliott and Ron William moving to KQOB and Rhythmic Top 40 KKWD's Joey and Heather replacing the duo at KYIS. On December 3, the changes became official, with KKWD moving afternoon host Mike Ipong to the morning slot. In addition, sister W255CJ in Atlanta dropped the "Nash Icon" format on the same day for Christmas music as "Warm 98.9", then stunted again with AC on December 26, followed by a series of hints of yet another flip to take place January 1, 2016.
25	Geraldo Rivera posted on his Facebook page that in the wake of the changes at Cumulus Media, his tenure as midday host at Talk WABC/New York City has come to an end. His final show aired on November 27. Rivera would file a lawsuit against Cumulus over his dismissal on December 11.
28	WSM/Nashville's live country music show The Grand Ole Opry celebrated its 90th anniversary with performances by Brad Paisley, Asleep at the Wheel, Old Crow Medicine Show, and Del McCoury Band.

=== December ===
Date	Event
2	Another FM frequency alignment in Salt Lake City is announced as Broadway Media makes a deal with Community Wireless, who will move KPCW-FM down from 91.9 to 91.7 and take ownership of the 107.9 signal that Broadway is donating to them after they move KUDD's Top 40 format to 105.1, where it will replace KAUU's Country format, and will see Rhythmic Top 40 KUUU move from 92.5 to 92.3 along with an upgraded coverage to cover the Salt Lake Valley metropolitan area.
3	Just 10 months after its launch, CHRF/Montreal dropped its bilingual LGBT format and started stunting with Christmas music. A new format is expected after the holidays.
4	WJCL-FM/Savannah became the first Cumulus-owned Country station to drop the Nash FM branding to return to its former branding, restoring the "Kix 96" moniker it dropped in September 2013.
7	Front Range Sports Networks sells ESPN Radio affiliate KJAC/Timnath-Denver to Community Radio for Northern Colorado, who will convert the station to a non-commercial Adult Album Alternative format on February 29, 2016, allowing primary station KUNC/Fort Collins, Colorado to focus on News/Talk programming. After KJAC ends its programming on January 3, 2016, ESPN Radio will return to former Denver affiliate KEPN in a full-time status with sister KKFN adding overnight programming (and dropping Fox Sports Radio from the schedule) starting January 4, 2016.
7	The entire airstaff of WMXJ/Miami are released, leaving the Entercom Classic Hits outlet semi-jockless until January 2016, when the station will flip formats.
8	Diane Rehm announces her retirement and the end of her daily radio show on NPR, effective November 2016.
15	Howard Stern renews his contract with SiriusXM for five more years.
17	Entercom spins off another Denver property, as it sells Oldies KRWZ to KSE Media Ventures. The Oldies format will move to Adult Standards KEZW and relaunch as "Crusin' 1430" December 27.
18	A major shuffling takes place in Lubbock, Texas as five stations swap signals and frequencies. Tejano KEJS trades places with Sports KTTU-FM, who in turn trade places with AC KLZK, who in turn trade places with Classic Rock KLBB-FM, who in turn trade places with Tejano KXTQ-FM, who in turn move to KEJS' signal.
18	WNEW-FM/Annapolis/Washington, D.C. ends its All News format, as CBS Radio leases the station out to Bloomberg News and flips the station to Bloomberg Radio.
22	KCXX/Riverside-San Bernardino ends its 20-year run with Alternative with a flip to Rhythmic Hot AC as "Hot 103.9" and new call letters KHTI.
24	Alpha Media spins off the Merced, California duopoly of Rhythmic Top 40 KHTN and Country KUBB to Mapleton Communications, who in turn spins off Active Rock KBRE and Spanish AC KGAM to Radio Lazer to comply with FCC ownership limits.
26	KFMB-FM/San Diego drops the Adult Top 40 format and Jack FM branding after 10 years, as it begins stunting with a wheel of formats. The new format will debut January 4, 2016.
27	After splitting from a simulcast of Adult Top 40 WWZY to play Christmas music in November, WBHX/Monmouth County, New Jersey flips to Classic Hits, putting it in competition with WJRZ.
28	Classic Hits WODC/Columbus, Ohio shifts to Adult hits as "93.3 The Bus."
28	Rhythmic Top 40 KAGM/Los Alamos-Albuquerque rebrands from "Power 106.7" to "Wild 106.7," this time shifting from a R&B/Hip-Hop lean to a broader Rhythmic Pop/Dance direction. This marks the third time that the "Wild" moniker have been used in the Albuquerque market, as it was used at sister stations KDLW and KLVO.
28	In the Rio Grande Valley, KQXX-FM drops Classic Rock and becomes a simulcast of Adult Top 40 KHKZ.
28	Longtime Richmond AC WTVR-FM drops the "Lite" moniker and flips to Adult Top 40 as "Mix 98.1."
28	Longtime Mobile AC WMXC drops the "Lite" moniker and rebrands as "Mix 99.9," but retains their format and lineup
28	Former Country WPLZ-HD2 & W295BI/Chattanooga flips to Soft Oldies as "Big Easy 106.9," complementing Classic Hits sister WPLZ.
31	News/Talk WBOC-FM/Salisbury, Maryland flips to AC with a local presentation.

== Debuts ==
Date	Event
January 1	ABC Radio relaunched its network after breaking its ties and ownership from Westwood One, who under owners Cumulus Media acquired the network from The Walt Disney Company, who will again become the owners. It also revamped its radio programming services under a new deal with Skyview Networks (who will also handle advertising sales and satellite distribution) and continue to make its radio news programming (via ABC News Radio and its FM counterpart ABC News Now) available when Cumulus' newly acquired Westwood One replaces it with its new CNN-powered news service. It also expanded to create new radio programming based on other ABC owned properties such as Good Morning America, Dancing With The Stars, and Jimmy Kimmel Live.
February 27	Flashback Fridays with Jammin' Jon debuts on WLZD-LP, Jon Colwell's first show on the airwaves since Flashback In 60 Minutes was pulled from WKCB-FM in November 2012.
March 9	Fargo, North Dakota picks up its first Rhythmic Top 40 outlet, as W245CM/Moorhead, Minnesota (the FM translator of KLTA-HD2) signs on as "96.9 Hits FM."
May 1	K292GH, the FM translator and HD3 sub channel of KDXT/Missoula, Montana, signs on with Rhythmic Top 40 as "106.3 The Heat."
May 19	Globalization Radio, a Rhythmic/Dance channel created by Pitbull and named after his 2014 album "Globalization," is launched on Sirius XM Radio.
May 22	Cumulus Media will launch a Classic Hip-Hop network targeted towards a multi-ethnic audience.
June 5	WMBX/West Palm Beach's HD2 sub channel and FM translator would debut with a Rhythmic Top 40 format as "Beatz 96.3".
June 8	Apple Music launches the subscription-only Beats1 Radio streaming service.
August 13	Sirius XM adds five new channels to its lineup: Velvet (current-based AC vocalists), Sirius XM Fly (Classic R&B/Hip-Hop from the 1990s and Y2K), Fox News Headlines 24/7 (non-stop news from Fox News Radio), Comedy Greats (Classic comedy from the past to today), and Radio Andy (featuring uncensored pop culture and entertainment from Andy Cohen).
September 4	K280DD (the translator of KPLV-HD2) makes its debut as "Real 103.9", becoming Las Vegas's first commercial FM R&B/Hip-Hop outlet, as on the same day as the launch of Rhythmic Hot AC rival KXNT-FM, who dropped News/Talk the same day.
September 5	The panel show Because News is launched on CBC Radio One in Canada, broadcast from Toronto.
September 18	Just eight years after relocating from Bend to West Linn, Oregon (and to serve the Portland area), KWLZ-FM debuts with a hybrid Classic Rock/Hits format, joining an increasing field that includes Classic Rockers KGON and KFBW, and Classic Hits KLTH.
October 21	The HD2 sub channel and FM translator of Top 40/CHR WFBC-FM/Greenville, South Carolina signs on with R&B/Hip-Hop as "96.3 The Block."
November 4	Radio Disney launched a second audio service, a youth-oriented country music network.

== Closings ==
Date	Event
January 1	Sirius XM Radio and Harpo Productions announced that it has ceased operations on Oprah Radio after eight years. The channel, founded by Oprah Winfrey, served as an outlet for empowerment and lifestyle geared towards women.
January 31	After a 50-year run with Beautiful/Easy Listening (as well as the only outlet in the United States that continued to program in the same format since its 1965 sign-on), KNXR/Rochester, Minnesota signs off the air upon its change of ownership. The new owners plans to launch a new format on the 97.5 frequency after new studios are built.
March 27	Dennis Miller ends his radio program after eight years due to personal commitments on various projects, with Jonathan Brandmeier slated to replace Miller on the Westwood One lineup.
July 8	Tony Bruno retires from radio after over 20 years as a sports talk host, much of that nationally syndicated.
July 25	Aboriginal Voices Radio will cease operations on its five stations in Canada after the CRTC revoked their licenses “based on AVR's repeated and serious non-compliance with its regulatory obligations over four consecutive license terms as well as the Commission's complete lack of confidence in the licensee's ability to broadcast in compliance with those obligations going forward and therefore meet the unique needs of Aboriginal people.”
August 31	Westwood One ceased operations on the Adult Hits “S.A.M.” (Simply About Music) format.
November 7	Newsweb Corporation shuts down WCFJ/Chicago Heights, Illinois, saying that the brokered programming station was unprofitable. The license will be surrendered to the Federal Communications Commission.
November 16	With the announced acquisition by Pandora and Cumulus Media's writing down its 15% stake and ending its investment, Rdio ceases operations.
December 12	Midnight In The Desert host Art Bell announces his fifth (at least) "retirement" from radio, which comes just four months after he returned, due to a series of death threats against his family and his own safety after his studios in Pahrump, Nevada were fired upon (Bell has used similar excuses for his short "retirements" in the past). His producer, Heather Wade will take over the program.
December 31	After 33 years in radio as part the Bob and Tom show (including a 32-year run in mornings at Active Rock WFBQ/Indianapolis, which served as its flagship station for their syndicated show since 1995), Bob Kevoian will retire on this date.

== Deaths ==
- January 1: Mario Cuomo, 82. Former Governor of New York and early progressive talk radio host.
- January 2: Little Jimmy Dickens, 94. Frequent host and member of the Grand Ole Opry; country musician and comedian.
- January 4: Lance Diamond, 68. Radio host on WJYE and musician.
- January 7: Bernard Maris, 68, French journalist and radio presenter (killed in the terrorist attack on the Charlie Hebdo offices in Paris.
- January 9: Bud Paxson, 79. Radio and television owner, founder of Paxson Communications.
- January 15: Raoul Pantin, 71, Trinidadian journalist and broadcaster
- January 17: Justin Kili, 61, Papua New Guinean journalist and radio personality
- January 24: Joe Franklin, 88. Television and radio host based in New York City.
- January 26: Christopher “Kit” Carson, 58. Chief assistant on The Rush Limbaugh Show.
- February 9: Richard Sher, 66, US radio quiz show host (Says You!)
- February 12
  - Alison Gordon, 72, Canadian sports journalist, writer and broadcaster
  - Gary Owens, 80, DJ at several stations from 1952 to 2007, most notably KMPC in Los Angeles; voiced thousands of commercials and cartoon characters, was the announcer on Rowan & Martin's Laugh-In and hosted a daily program on the syndicated Music of Your Life network.
- February 14: Bernd Dost, 75, German journalist and broadcaster
- February 15: Sergio Blanco, 66, Spanish singer (Sergio y Estíbaliz), Eurovision entrant
- February 19: Warren Thomson, 79, Australian pianist and broadcaster
- March 5: Fred Latremouille, 69, Canadian radio host.
- March 11: Tony Fenton, 53, Irish radio presenter
- April 3: Paul Grigoriu, 70, Romanian radio personality (SRR).
- April 5: Gordon Moyes, 76, Australian radio evangelist and politician
- April 7: Stan Freberg, 88, American host of The Stan Freberg Show and When Radio Was, advertising executive and actor
- April 10: Richie Benaud, 84, Australian cricketer and commentator
- April 14: Roberto Tucci, 93, Italian Roman Catholic prelate, President of Vatican Radio (1985–2001)
- April 16: Nimal Mendis, 81, Sri Lankan singer and songwriter
- April 17: Don Quayle, 84, journalist and NPR's first president.
- May 1: David Day, 63, Australian radio broadcaster, 5KA
- May 14: B.B. King, 89, Blues musician whose career and stage name originated from his stint as an air personality at WDIA/Memphis.
- May 15: John Stephenson, 91. American radio, television and voice actor (radio work included roles on It's Always Sunday and The Count of Monte Cristo, and later commercials for Accountemps).
- May 23: Anne Meara, 85, Actress, singer, writer, producer and comedian (as one half of Stiller & Meara with husband Jerry Stiller), recipient of a Clio Award for her work with her husband in a series of radio ads for Blue Nun Wine.
- June 11: Jim Ed Brown, 81, American country musician. Member of the Grand Ole Opry since 1963 and host of the Country Music Greats Radio Hour since 2003.
- June 12: Monica Lewis, 93, American actress and singer, notable for being the voice of the Chiquita Banana girl and the host of her own radio program on WMCA/New York City.
- July 6: Stan Carew, 64, musician and regular host on CBC Radio.
- July 13: J. R. Gach, 63. Shock jock with various stops across the United States.
- July 17: Van Miller, 87. Longtime radio play-by-play announcer, best-known work was as voice of the Buffalo Bills Radio Network from 1960–71 and 1978–2003; other notable roles included calling the Buffalo Braves, Buffalo Stallions, Niagara Purple Eagles, and various non-sports roles at WFCB/Dunkirk, New York and WBEN/Buffalo, New York
- July 24: Peg Lynch, 98. American comedy writer and radio actress (most famous for her roles in the 1950s sitcom Ethel and Albert and its successor, The Couple Next Door)
- July 31: Alan Cheuse, 75. Novelist, George Mason University creative writing instructor, and literary commentator for NPR's All Things Considered
- August 25: Marguerite McDonald, 73. Canadian radio journalist, original host of CBC Radio's The House.
- August 29: Luo Lan, 95, Taiwanese writer and radio personality
- October 1: Usnija Redžepova, 69, Serbian singer who began her career on radio
- October 26: Ed Walker, 83. Washington, DC radio personality (work at several stations and programs, most notably with WRC's The Joy Boys and WAMU-FM's The Big Broadcast).
- December 27: Dave "Hendu" Henderson, 56. Radio commentator (and former player) for the Seattle Mariners.
