= Art Hains =

American broadcaster

Art Hains is a retired American sports broadcaster in Springfield, Missouri, who served as voice of the Missouri State Bears for over 40 years. His voice was also heard on the Kansas City Chiefs Radio Network.

He grew up in Marshall, Missouri, and started work at KMMO radio in Marshall while in high school. He graduated from Southern Methodist University (SMU) in Dallas, majoring in broadcast journalism, and worked in the SMU sports information office from 1973 to 1976. While at SMU, he was the student voice of the baseball team. After a brief return to Marshall, Hains was sports director of KGBX in Springfield from 1977–81, serving as the voice of the Southwest Missouri State Bears football and basketball teams. From 1981 to 1985, he worked on the sports staff at KRLD radio in Dallas, anchoring weekday sportscasts; hosting Dallas Cowboys pre- and post-game shows; doing play-by-play and color for SMU basketball; and serving as studio host for the Southwest Conference Football Radio Network from 1982 to 1984.

In 1985, he returned to Springfield as coordinator of athletic promotions at Southwest Missouri State, resuming his duties as voice of the Bears. From 1995 to 2008, he was sports director of Meyer Communications in Springfield, returning to the university (renamed Missouri State University in 2005) in 2008 as licensing director in the Marketing & Communications Department. From May 1, 1995, until September 2022, he hosted a daily afternoon radio show known as SportsTalk, which first aired on KWTO and later KWTO-FM when it changed to a sports radio format (the show and format moved to KBFL (AM) and KBFL-FM on July 30, 2020, after an ownership change of the group of radio stations). From 2008 to 2025, he served as studio host for the Kansas City Chiefs Radio Network in, including their Super Bowl victories in February 2020 and 2024.

In September 2022, he contracted West Nile virus and was in various health facilities while recovering. He resumed his studio duties with the Chiefs in August 2023 and resumed doing Bears home broadcasts the next month. Hains retired in September 2025 after calling one final Missouri State football game.

Hains was inducted into the Springfield Area Sports Hall of Fame in 2003, the Missouri Sports Hall of Fame in 2017, and the Missouri State University Athletics Hall of Fame in 2022. In December 2023, he was given the Spirit of the Valley award by Missouri Valley Conference Commissioner Jeff Jackson.
