= KWTO =

KWTO may refer to:

- KWTO (AM), a radio station (560 AM) licensed to Springfield, Missouri, United States
- KWTO-FM, a radio station (101.3 FM) licensed to serve Buffalo, Missouri
- KTXR, a radio station (98.7 FM) licensed to Springfield, Missouri, which held the call sign KWTO-FM from 1966 to 1990 and from 1994 to 2020
