= KBFL =

KBFL may refer to:

- the ICAO code for Meadows Field Airport
- KBFL (AM), a radio station (1060 AM) licensed to Springfield, Missouri, United States
- KBFL-FM, a radio station (99.9 FM) licensed to Fair Grove, Missouri
