= KTXR =

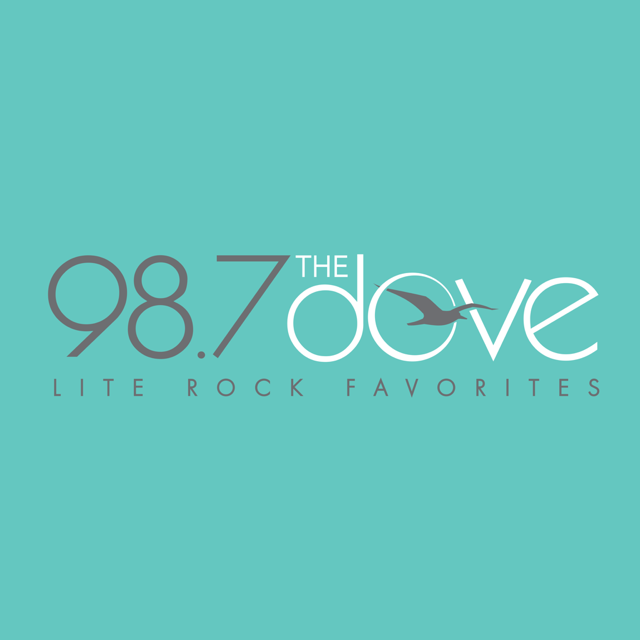
- Springfield, Missouri; United States
- Frequency: 98.7 MHz
- Branding: 98.7 the Dove

Programming
- Format: Soft adult contemporary

Ownership
- Owner: Zimmer Radio of Mid-Missouri; (Zimmer Midwest Communications, Inc.)
- Sister stations: KBFL; KWTO (AM); KWTO-FM; KZMO

History
- First air date: November 23, 1967 (as KWTO-FM)
- Former call signs: KWTO-FM (1966–1990); KKHT (1990–1994); KWTO-FM (1994–2020)

Technical information
- Licensing authority: FCC
- Facility ID: 35901
- Class: C1
- ERP: 100,000 watts
- HAAT: 168 meters (551 ft)
- Transmitter coordinates: 37°4′6.1″N 93°18′31.6″W

Links
- Public license information: Public file; LMS
- Webcast: Listen live
- Website: 987thedove.com

KTXR ("98.7 the Dove") is a radio station licensed to Springfield, Missouri, United States, broadcasting a soft adult contemporary format. The station was previously a sports talk format known as "JOCK 98.7 ESPN". This format moved to 98.7 FM's sister stations KBFL and KBFL-FM (1060 AM/96.9 FM/99.9 FM) on July 30, 2020, as part of the purchase of the Meyer Communications owned stations (which also includes KWTO and KWTO-FM) by Zimmer Midwest Communications.

== History ==
KTXR went on the air as KWTO-FM on November 23, 1967; it later adopted a rock format and was known as "Rock 99". The name lasted well into the 1980s until rival station KXUS went on the air in April 1985 with a similar format. Rock 99 was originally an automated music format utilizing the TM Stereo Rock format from Dallas, Texas, which featured rock, pop, oldies, and some album cuts. The on-air format featured two new songs followed by two older songs in each music set.

In 1982, the station dropped its rock format to adopt a contemporary hit radio (CHR) format; it retained the "Rock 99" name until 1986, when KWTO-FM became known as "99 Hit FM". It was Springfield's dominant CHR station throughout the 1980s and the early 1990s. The call letters were changed to KKHT in late 1990, and then the following year, the branding became "The Heart". In August 1993, the station returned to its classic rock roots with the moniker "98.7 FM Rock 99" and changed the call letters back to KWTO-FM on February 14, 1994.

In 2001, the station adopted an all-sports format and became known as "The JOCK, 98.7 FM". The station became an affiliate of Fox Sports Radio, and also carried The Jim Rome Show.

On October 23, 2014, it was announced that KWTO-FM would drop Fox Sports Radio and affiliate with ESPN Radio effective January 1, 2015. On the same date, Fox Sports Radio moved to KGMY, which was the previous ESPN Radio affiliate for Springfield.

Logo as an ESPN affiliate

On July 24, 2020, veteran on air sports personality Art Hains announced that the group of Meyer Communications owned radio stations were being purchased by Zimmer Midwest Communications and the JOCK sports format would be moving to KBFL (1060 AM/96.9 FM) and KBFL-FM 99.9 in early August. He also advised that KWTO-FM would transition "into a frequency that's music and personality-driven". The JOCK began simulcasting on all of the KBFL signals on July 30, and unveiled a new logo reflecting the new frequencies "JOCK 96.9 FM 99.9 FM 1060 AM". ESPN on air promos branded the new stations as "ESPN the JOCK". The format fully transitioned to the KBFL frequencies as of August 7.

On August 11, 2020, KWTO-FM began broadcasting a soft rock format with the moniker "98.7 the Dove" after four days of stunting with Christmas music. It would later switch its format to a mix of soft adult contemporary and classic hits formats, retaining its "Lite Rock" slogan. In an additional surprise move, Zimmer also swapped the call letters of KWTO-FM with that of KTXR (101.3 FM). The call sign change was registered by the Federal Communications Commission on August 20. The station features the return of "The Kevin & Liz Show", a popular local morning duo who were previously on KGBX-FM (and on KTOZ-FM in years prior); their show was cancelled by iHeartMedia (owner of KGBX) in January 2020.
