= KVRQ =

KVRQ may refer to:

- KRWD, a radio station (93.3 FM) licensed to serve Muleshoe, Texas, United States, which held the call sign KVRQ from 2018 to 2022; see List of radio stations in Texas
- KPNW-FM, a radio station (98.9 FM) licensed to serve Seattle, Washington, United States, which held the call sign KVRQ from 2016 to 2018
- KMZR, a radio station (92.5 FM) licensed to serve Atwater, California, United States, which held the call sign KVRQ from 1991 to 1999
