= KKCL =

KKCL may refer to:

- KKCL (AM), a radio station (1550 AM) licensed to serve Golden, Colorado, United States
- KKCL-FM, a radio station (98.1 FM) licensed to serve Lorenzo, Texas, United States
- KXJJ, a radio station (1570 AM) licensed to serve Loveland, Colorado, which held the call sign KKCL from 2015 to 2016
