= KGAM =

KGAM may refer to:

- KGAM (FM), a radio station (106.3 FM) licensed to serve Merced, California, United States
- KCOD, a defunct radio station (1450 AM) formerly licensed to serve Palm Springs, California, which held the call sign KGAM from 1997 to 2010
