= KTTS =

KTTS may refer to:

- The ICAO airport code for NASA Shuttle Landing Facility
- KTTS-FM, a radio station (94.7 FM) licensed to Springfield, Missouri, United States
- KGMY, a radio station (1400 AM) licensed to Springfield, Missouri, United States which held the call sign KTTS from 1926 to 1987
- KOLR, a television station (channel 10) licensed to Springfield, Missouri, United States which held the call sign KTTS-TV from 1953 to 1971
- KDE Text-to-speech engine
