= WKCB =

WKCB can refer to:

- WKCB (AM), a radio station (1340 AM) licensed to Hindman, Kentucky, United States
- WKCB-FM, a radio station (107.1 FM) licensed to Hindman, Kentucky, United States
