= KSIP =

KSIP may refer to:

- KSIP (FM), a defunct radio station (91.5 FM) formerly licensed to serve Forrest City, Arkansas, United States
- KWRP, a radio station (690 AM) licensed to serve Pueblo, Colorado, United States, which held the call sign KSIP in 2009
