= KRMX =

KRMX may refer to:

- KRMX (FM), a radio station (104.9 FM) licensed to serve Bellmead, Texas, United States
- KZBI (FM), a radio station (92.9 FM) licensed to serve Marlin, Texas, which held the call sign KRMX from 2010 to 2024
- KBZT, a radio station (94.9 FM) licensed to serve San Diego, California, United States, which held the call sign KRMX-FM from 1991 to 1992
- KWRP, a radio station (690 AM) licensed to serve Pueblo, Colorado, United States, which held the call sign KRMX from 1981 to 2009
