= Uncle Kokua =

Hawaiian reality television series

Uncle Kokua is a Hawaiian reality television series airing on KHII-TV.

== Cast ==
- Marc Paskin, a.k.a. Uncle Kokua, is a multi-millionaire and also the main character of the show. He drives around a van called the "Kokua Bus". He has a self-stated goal to die broke, saying that "When you die, you can't take [...] [money] with you." He was once a realtor.
  - The Assistants, Sloane and Caroline, are two of Marc's helpers.
- Leilani is Marc's Toy Dog.

== Premise ==
The show follows a millionaire real estate investor and his philanthropic work in Hawaii. He drives around to different parts of the island of Oahu and gives money to people in need. Uncle Kokua has given monetary gifts from $500 to $1 million.

== History ==
In 2011, the person known as Uncle Kokua, Marc Paskin, a San Diego millionaire, appeared on ABC's Secret Millionaire. The reality show, which he produced, began airing in April 2012.

In December, 2014, Paskin hosted a one-hour special of Uncle Kokua called "Uncle Kokua: The Christmas Special." In the episode, Uncle Kokua went all over Oahu to families and different people who were in need and provided them with Christmas presents.
