= KADZ =

Radio station in Arvada, Colorado (1962–2003)

- Arvada, Colorado; United States
- Broadcast area: Denver-Boulder, Colorado
- Frequency: 1550 kHz

History
- First air date: January 9, 1962
- Last air date: June 1, 2003
- Former call signs: KBRB (1960–1961); KDAB (1961–1965); KQXI (1965–1998); KDDZ (1998–1999)

Technical information
- Facility ID: 54743
- Class: B
- Power: 10,000 watts (day); 166 watts (night)

KADZ (1550 AM) was a radio station licensed to Arvada, Colorado, and serving the Denver-Boulder radio market. The station began broadcasting in 1962, and was deleted in 2003, when operations were transferred to an expanded band assignment on 1690 kHz.

== History ==
On May 18, 1960, the Federal Communications Commission (FCC) issued a construction permit to John Buchanan, trading as the Satellite Center Radio Company, for 1550 AM in Arvada, Colorado, which selected the call sign KBRB.

The station had not yet been built when Denver Area Broadcasters, owned by Frances C. Gaguine and Bernice Schwartz, acquired the construction permit the next year. Taking its new call letters from the name of the licensee, KDAB signed on the air on January 9, 1962, broadcasting as a 10,000-watt daytime radio station. In early 1965, the station moved from Top 40 music to easy listening.

A June 1965 storm flooded the transmitter site along the banks of the South Platte River and washed away KDAB's transmitter, transmitter building and tower, forcing the station off the air for a number of weeks. The initial temporary 250-watt transmitter burned out quickly, requiring a 5 kW transmitter to be procured.

That fall the station rebranded as KQXI, with the new call letters taking effect on September 27, 1965. Richard P. McKee bought into the station in 1967, but Schwartz acquired the other two partners' stakes in KQXI two years later and reorganized her holding as Media Enterprizes, Inc., in 1970. Schwartz relocated the studio and transmitter to a new site in Englewood in 1974. During much of this time, KQXI was constantly changing its format. On June 1, 1970, it switched from country to gospel music, avoiding competition with a 24-hour station that had flipped to country.

KQXI, along with Bernice's other radio holdings, was folded into the group owned by her husband, Harold S. Schwartz and Associates, which primarily consisted of stations running religious programming. In 1986, the entire Schwartz chain was sold to BDG Enterprises, in a deal worth $9.1 million; BDG's principals were Burt W. Kaufman and George Spicer, the president and general manager of Schwartz station KXEG in Phoenix. KQXI was able to add nighttime service with 166 watts during the ownership of BDG, which changed its name to Radio Property Ventures.

=== Expanded Band assignment ===
On March 17, 1997, the FCC announced that 88 stations had been given permission to move to newly available "Expanded Band" transmitting frequencies, ranging from 1610 to 1700 kHz, with KQXI authorized to move from 1550 to 1690 kHz. A construction permit for the expanded band station was assigned the call letters KAYK on November 10, 1997.

In June 1998, Radio Property Ventures sold KQXI on 1550 AM and the KAYK construction permit for 1690 AM for $3.5 million to ABC, Inc., at a time when the company was buying stations for the Radio Disney network. KAYK began operations on June 3, and the simulcasting by 1550 AM and 1690 AM began carrying Radio Disney programming. After the sale closed late in 1998, the stations took on new Disney-inspired call letters on December 11, 1998, as 1550 AM became KDDZ, while 1690 AM changed to KADZ. On January 15, 1999, these call letters were swapped, with 1550 AM changing to KADZ and 1690 AM becoming KDDZ.

The FCC's initial policy for expanded band assignments was that both the original station and its expanded band counterpart could operate simultaneously for up to five years, after which owners would have to turn in one of the two licenses, depending on whether they preferred the new assignment or elected to remain on the original frequency. ABC chose to retain the expanded band frequency. KADZ on 1550 AM was reported to have ceased broadcasting on June 1, 2003, and the station was formally deleted by the FCC on November 18, 2003. In 2011 a new Denver-area station, now known as KKCL, was licensed for the vacated 1550 kHz.
