= KTOZ-FM =

Radio station in Pleasant Hope, Missouri

- Pleasant Hope, Missouri; United States
- Broadcast area: Springfield, Missouri
- Frequency: 95.5 MHz
- Branding: Alice 95.5

Programming
- Format: Hot adult contemporary
- Affiliations: Premiere Networks

Ownership
- Owner: iHeartMedia, Inc.; (iHM Licenses, LLC)
- Sister stations: KGBX-FM; KGMY; KSWF; KXUS

History
- First air date: May 1, 1993 (as KZBE)
- Former call signs: KZBE (1993–1996)

Technical information
- Licensing authority: FCC
- Facility ID: 55104
- Class: C2
- ERP: 44,000 watts
- HAAT: 159 meters
- Transmitter coordinates: 37°13′25″N 93°14′30″W

Links
- Public license information: Public file; LMS
- Webcast: Listen live (via iHeartRadio)
- Website: alice955.iheart.com

KTOZ-FM (95.5 MHz), also identified on-the-air as Alice 95.5, is a radio station broadcasting a hot adult contemporary format. Licensed to Pleasant Hope, Missouri, United States. The station is owned by iHeartMedia, Inc., through licensee iHM Licenses, LLC.

Prior to Alice, KTOZ aired an alternative rock format as "Z95.5 The Edge - Springfield's New Rock Alternative". Prior to 1998 the station was known as "Channel Z95 - Springfield's Super Station". Until 1996, it was KZBE "B95", which aired a classic hits format.

KTOZ-FM airs shows from Ryan Seacrest, Johnjay & Rich, and program director Clint Girlie.
