= Bernd Dost =

German writer and filmmaker

Bernd Dost (May 16, 1939 – February 14, 2015) was a German journalist, filmmaker, writer and publisher. He produced documentaries for ARD, Germany’s leading Public TV Station, and wrote articles for the magazine Stern and the newspapers Münchner Merkur and Münchner Abendzeitung. His documentary works are socio-critical and deal with major topics such as environmental protection, human rights and psychology. As a documentary film maker, Bernd Dost has worked with various people like Jane Goodall, the Anti-psychiatry pioneer Ronald David Laing or the writer Carl Amery. His novels include elements of surrealism, transgressional fiction and postmodernism and deal with mass media, religion and psychology. He was the brother of theater and film actress Roswitha Dost.

== Biography and work ==
=== Youth ===
Dost was born in Dortmund. His father, Josef Dost, was a foreman, and his mother, Elisabeth "Elli" Dost, a writer. During the Second World War Bernd Dost experienced the bombing of Dortmund, was subsequently evacuated and grew up in Hemer in the Sauerland. From a very early age he was interested in a career as a writer and journalist.

He graduated from secondary school in 1957 in Iserlohn, then studied both German and English languages and literature as well as psychology in Marburg and Munich. He worked his way through university, performing a wide assortment of jobs. For example, as a trainee, he worked for the Westfälische Rundschau in Iserlohn and in his Munich days was involved in the student magazine Profil. He was also hired intermittently by the Insel Film company as an Assistant Script Editor.

=== Journalism ===
Bernd Dost elected to be self-employed early in his career but soon experienced financial difficulties associated with the Werbefilm-Studio, a company he co-founded with Canadian Richard Archer. The Studio did not last long, but through Archer, Dost met the Editor-in-Chief and founder of the Münchner Abendzeitung (AZ), Werner Friedmann. Dost then wrote local stories and captions for the legendary photos of attractive local young women by glamour photographer and friend Kurt Huhle. This early "cheesecake" photography was published in the well-read AZ gossip column by Hannes "Hunter" Obermaier.

It was at this time that the Münchner Merkur became aware of Bernd Dost and hired him to write substantive reports. His successful affiliation with the newspaper ceased at the end of 1966 because of artistic and political differences with the main editorial office.

The professional breakup resulted from an article Bernd Dost had written portraying the fate of impoverished Josefine Countess Wrbna-Kaunitz, a trustee of the estate of and confidante of the Wittelsbacher family, who had been snubbed by members of Bavaria’s royalty. In this affair, known as the "BAURA scandal" he championed the people who felt they had been duped by the legal staff of the President of the Bavarian Parliament, Rudolf Hanauer, a member of the conservative Christian Social Union (CSU) party. Under the presidential banner, plots of land were apparently sold illegally. Dost’s defense of those claiming "foul" was too politically sensitive for the Münchner Merkur, particularly with its close ties to the CSU and he was soon looking for another job.

He then went to Hamburg to write for Stern magazine with a very ambitious, if not ambiguous personal recommendation: "We can confirm that he is a very quick-witted journalist with an extremely clear opinion of his own." Together with Heiko Gebhardt he soon became one of the young journalists featured at the magazine by chief editor Henri Nannen. Dost’s work was also held in high esteem by editors Peter Neuhauser and Manfred Bissinger.

=== Film making ===
In May 1968, Dost was sent to Paris to report on the student revolts as backup correspondent. After a period in Paris, he began his career as a documentary filmmaker in Munich. But, while working in the business program of the Bayerischer Rundfunk (Bavaria’s public Radio and TV complex), he seldom saw eye to eye with the editor-in-chief (and later TV director) Wolf Feller, an intimate friend of the Bavarian Prime Minister, Franz Josef Strauss, about the political content of their work. Nevertheless, he learned much in the fields of visual and drama arts that led to his writing, editing and directing TV documentaries. Dost established good friendships with cartoonist Dieter Hanitzsch and editor Brigitte Schroedter and good relationships with colleagues Wolfgang Kahle, Thilo Schneider, Dietmar Ebert, Karl Neumann, Henric L. Wuermeling, Jürgen Martin Moeller, Meggy Steffens, Christel Hinrichsen, and with Rudolf Mühlfenzl, the somewhat baroque, liberal editor-in-chief.

In 1978, Bernd Dost married Caroline von Harder, a businesswoman, who headed the PR department of the Beck clothing store in Munich and who set up a mail order business of her own selling decorative household accessories. Their daughter Franziska Dost studied TV journalism and later, European Ethnology in Berlin.

=== Fiction ===
In 1998, Bernd Dost founded the Vedra Verlag in which he first published his own novels under the pseudonym of R.B. van Mattruer and later other books under his own name plus an extensive collection of short stories by Elisabeth Dost (Elli Dost). In the same year he wrote the book "Schiffe Versenken", a vivid novel set in the world of harbours, smugglers and thieves, using the language of the dockers and seamen and elements of Low German ("Platt") which you still can hear in Hamburg today (example: "Ich werd euch nun, min Deern un' min Jung, verklaren, wie's mit mir und Ronja weiterging.").

His next book "Tote leben länger" describes the media hype created around a man in coma who was found in a corn field covered with wounds and suffering from a brain injury, while the TV talk show host Buck Blohm tries to present him as the returned and incarnated Jesus Christ. The book is outlined as a crime thriller though the actual story deals in a sarcastic way with conspiracy theories, tasteless politicians, bizarre journalists and other ominous characters all suddenly interested in the body of the unknown more-dead-than-alive man.

With "die zornigen" (the enraged) Bernd Dost wrote his most transgressive/transgressional novel, telling the story of a small group of common people who "just can't take it anymore" and who turn to actions of terrorism against the mass media system.

"The book "die zornigen" is an infectious story of people who want to change our world. It throws a bridge of ideas stemming from the French Revolution over the dropouts of ´68 across to the raging opponents to the merciless globalization of today. The story revolves around three people: Roger, the hesitating journalist, Cat, the aggressive nurse and Sol, the charismatic social worker. They among others, comprise "the enraged" - more enraged than ever, in view of the menacing annihilation of our pride, our freedom, our culture after 9/11." (press text)

In 2004 Dost wrote the surreal and tragicomic book "Mensch Frankenstein". The fantastic, mystical novel is the story of an honest, belligerent human creature born in a subway in the San Francisco, who is arrested and made to fit in with the rules of the predominant form of society; he receives a character mask and then a sculpted plastic body armour and rises to become a successful monster in the world of politics and industry. Self-revelation, the love of a courageous woman and the encounter with a mystic in Zurich save "Frankenstein the Man" and allow the natural true being to re-emerge. The US Administration sentences the creature, whom it regards as a danger to the state, and disposes of it in a branch of Guantánamo.

Bernd Dost's last novel was called "Der Zug ohne Wiederkehr" (The train of no return). The novel clearly continues the humanistic and humanitarian ideas of "the enraged" and "Mensch Frankenstein". It was published in 2008.

== Filmography / Bibliography ==
=== Documentary Films ===
1972:

- "Diseases of Society: Stress: a disease of civilization" (30')
- "Brains Inc. - A psychological show about manipulation (60’)
- "About Ourselves: Protracted Old Age" (32’)
- "Review of a Year: a Psychogram of the Events of 1972" (66')

1973:

- "Slow Motion: Eros and Politics" (47´)
- "Human Games: An Experiment in Group Dynamics" (80´)
- "Slow Motion: When You're on Your Way: Understanding the Other" (45´)
- "Slow Motion: The Star is Dead - is the Star Dead?" (45´)
- "A Year in Retrospect: Psychogram of the Events of 1973" (58´)

1974:

- "Slow Motion: A Number for Everyone - Registered, Programmed, Controlled" (45´)
- "Slow Motion: Worker and Model" (43’)
- "A Year in Retrospect: Psychogram of the Events of 1974" (45´)

1975:

- "Death of a Sea: The Mediterranean Sewage Pit" (45´)
- "Slow Motion: The Rumor" (45´)
- "The Big Prize" (43´)
- "What They Call Normal or: Life is Child’s Play" (44´)

1976:

- "Cypriot Family Life" (42´)
- "Apprenticeship in Feeling: Esalen, Big Sur" (45´)

1977:

- "Hope of Healing: Lourdes and Faith Healers" (45´)
- "Miracles Happen All the Time; About People that Have Survived Against the Odds" (45´)
- "People, Drinks and Politics: Portrait of a Standup Bar" (45´)
- "Olé HSV! - Football - A Circus for Millions" (58´)
- "Workplace Situation: Nobody Don't Know Nothing!" (45´)
- "Family Vacation. One German, One Swedish and One Italian Family in Lignano" (45’)

1978:

- "Shady New Flags: Exploitation on Ships Under New Flags" (45´)
- "Green Time: Environmental Protection in the Form of a Party" (45´)
- "I Represent Young People" (45´)
- "The Emigrants: Off to Australia" (45´)
- "The Flying Doctor: On the Way to Lonely Farms in Australia" (45´)
- "About Driving, Franzen and Tuning - Rally Drivers" (43´)

1979:

- "A Fragmented Image: What People Think of Politicians" (45´)

1980:

- "Mary and Jesus: Between Oath and Business Profit in Oberammergau" (45´)
- "Of Heroes, Buccaneers and Crash Pilots: Private Flyers" (43´)
- "Extreme Travel: Survival Training in Canada" (43´)
- "Recreation Areas for Everyone: The dilemma on Lake Shores" (45´)

1981:

- "Exotic Profits: International Trade With Protected Animals" (45´)
- "Constant Trouble With the Program: Scandals in the Theater" (45’)
- "The Friendly Sharks: The Profitable Business of Rescue Shipping" (45’)

1982:

- "Contemporary History on Television: The Reichstag Fire" (90´)
- "Last Farewells: Of Young Runaways and Desperate Parents" (60´)
- "The Emigrants and What Became of Them" (45´)
- "The Anguish Telephone: Children Calling For Help" (45´)
- "Inheriting Evils: Sick Environment, Sick Children" (45´)

1983:

- "The Programmed Catastrophe: Safety at Sea" (45´)
- "Situation: Us and the Children: Overshadowed by Dachau" (45´)
- "Under the Hammer. Fortunes Around an Auction House" (45´)

1984:

- "The Revenge of the Victims: Taking the Law into One’s Own Hands" (45´)
- "Helpless in the Flow. Powerless Against the Power of the Power Suppliers" (45´)
- "Searching for Heirs" (59´)

1985:

- "Rescue the Mediterranean: The 10-Year Battle for the Mare Nostrum" (45´)
- "Everyone Has His Nest in Mind: Iserlohn Revisited" (69´)
- "Dangerous Freight: The Risk of Transporting a Hazardous Load" (45´)
- "Night Studio: The Little Nobel Prize" (60´)

1986:

- "Marco Polo’s Heirs: Traveling with Businessmen" (45´)
- "Einstein’s Child Prodigies: Of the Happiness and Misery of the Highly Gifted" (60´)
- "Sinking Ships: Criminal Practices in Shipping" (30´)

1987:

- "My Home is the Big Top: Chicky Altenburger, Clown" (45´)
- "My Home is the Sea: Immo von Schnurbein and the Gorch Fock" (45´)
- "My Home is the Stars: Gustav A. Tammann, Astronomer" (59´)
- "My Home is the Jungle: Jane Goodall and the Chimpanzees of Gombe" (45´)

1988:

- "Luxury, Smiles, Loneliness: A Ship’s Doctor on a Cruise Liner" (45´)
- "Computers Are Not for Kissing: Mankind in the Age of Data Processing" (45´)
- "Art as Hot Goods: Art Fakers, Art Robbers, Art Searchers (45´)

1989:

- "Hunting Down Ancestors: On the Adventure of Discovering Your Family" (45´)
- "People Under the Hammer: Compulsory Auctions" (45´)
- "The Toothless Tigers: The Youth Organizations of the Political Parties" (45´)
- "In the Future: Open-Minded Thinkers Needed" (45´)
- „War Brides: Katharina Militello" (30´)
- "War Brides: Lisa Slaughter" (30´)
- "Highly-Gifted Children: Observations Over a Period of Three Years" (60´)

1990:

- "Yesterday’s Enemy, Today’s Comrade? The Federal German Armed Forces and the National People’s Army" (45´)
- "A Wound That Won't Heal: Deforestation in Papua New Guinea" (45´)
- "Yesterday and Today: Rioting in Schwabing" (30´)
- "Legally Incapacitated: On the Drama of No Longer Being a Person" (59´)

1991:

- "30 Years of Amnesty International: The Fight for Human Rights" (45´)
- "People Who Change Their Lives: From Officer to Missionary" (30´)
- "People Who Change Their Lives: A Surgeon in Search of the Soul" (30´)
- "People Who Change Their Lives: From Engineer to Priest" (30´)

1992:

- "Hope of Healing (I): The Chances of Gentle Medicine" (45´)
- "Hope of Healing (II): On the Way to Energy-Based Medicine" (45´)
- "Blue Helmets: With a UN Unit in Yugoslavia" (45´)
- "All Kinds of People: Angelo Conti Rossini" (30´)
- "Plunge Into a Void: On the Fate of People with Cranio-Cerebral Injuries" (45´)

1993:

- "The Long Waltz: Dancing, My Life. Walter Deutsch" (58´)
- "Nature Hits Back: Climatic Catastrophes" (45´)
- "Reportage on Monday: Contaminated Home" (45´)
- "Lifeline: The Conductor Eduard Macku" (45´)
- "An Eagle with Broken Wings: Dancing, My Life. Ilias Pilalis" (60´)

1994:

- "Report on Monday: What Make Children Sick Today" (45´)

1995:

- "Lifeline: The Cook, the Clown and His Love of Anarchy: Angelo Conti Rossini" (45´)
- "Spiritual Crises. Sense in Insanity" (45´) (not broadcast)
- "Geniuses of Tomorrow: Intermediate Report on a Long-Term Observation" (45´)
- "Dachau Concentration Camp" (90´)
- "Lifeline: Anna. Florist. Anna Lindner" (45´)
- "Three Women in Papua New Guinea: Between a Hut and a High-Rise Block" (58´)

1996:

- "Did Kohl Kiss Madonna? How Pictures Can Be Manipulated" (45´)
- "Lifeline: The Napoleon Among Landlords. Richard Süßmeier" (45´)
- "The Kind Uncle: The Life and Death of Felix Haserick" (45´)
- "Highlights of the 41st German Historians’ Congress" (45´)
- "Save Our Children: Violence on TV and Its Consequences" (45´)

1997:

- "Lifeline: Death Embraces Us In the Middle of Life. Claudia Marschner, Undertaker" (45´)
- "The Firm - Siemens: A German Family History" (45´)
- "Lifeline: Always on Course. Pilot Hein Mehrkens" (45´)
- "Suddenly Gone: The Fates of Missing Youngsters" (80´)
- "Lifeline: A Gentleman from Bohemia and His Love of Beauty. Rainer Kreissl’’ (45’)

1998:

- "Simply to Live: Young people and Their Right to a Future" (45´)
- "Lifeline: A Piece of Chocolate, Miss? Kathy and Dany Militello" (45´)

1999:

- "20 Days in the 20th Century: Chernobyl - The Atomic Scare" (44´)
- "20 Days in the 20th Century: Hiroshima - The Nuclear Threat" (44´)
- "Walt Disney’s Secret: Tracing a Legend" (68')
- "Lifeline: You'll Never Be Down with Frieda. - Frieda Hiesgen, Canteen landlady" (44´)

2000:

- "Lifeline: I’ll paint a Rembrandt Today. Günter Hopfinger" (44´)
- "World Courier: Family Life in Kazakhstan" (26´)
- "World Courier: Family Life in Siberia" (26´)
- "World Courier: Family Life in Tansania" (26´)
- "World Courier: Family Life in Eritrea" (26´)
- "World Courier: Family Life in Egypt" (26´)
- "Four Bright Minds: Long-Term Observation of Highly-Gifted Children" (88´)
- "The Amazons of Oberammergau: the Passion of the Strong Women" (79´)

2001:

- "Lifeline: Digging Charley of Seebruck. Karl Ostermayer" (45´)
- "Scene of Crime - a Child: Violence That Came Out of the Cold" (45´)

2002:

- "Man as a Victim" (45´)
- "The Clones Are Coming: Genetic Engineering, Dream or Nightmare?" (45´)
- "In the Waiting Room of Death: The Fates of Forced Labourers" (74´)
- "Lifeline: Catching the Right Moment. Inge Feltrinelli, Publisher" (45´)
- "Escape to the Paradises in the World of Advertising" (45´)
- "Scandals in the Federal Republic of Germany: The Witch Trials of Memmingen" (45´)

2003:

- "Lifeline: A Gentleman from Bohemia and His Love of Beauty (II)
- "Rainer Kreissl" (45´)

2004:

- "Lifeline: The Oktoberfest Landlord from Nockherberg. Peter Pongratz" (45´)
- "To Europe Together: German-Czech Reconciliation" (45´)

=== Books ===
==== Non-fiction ====
- "The Evil Heritage; Sick Children, Sick Environment", Koesel Verlag, 1985
- "A Country Suffocating", Koesel Verlag, 1986
- "Projects of Hope: The Alternative Nobel Prize", with Jakob von Uexküll, Raben Verlag, 1986
- "Healing With Holistic Medicine", Koesel Verlag, 1995 and Goldmann Taschenbuch, 1996
- Afterword for the German release of "American Mania: When More Is Not Enough " by Peter C. Whybrow, Vedra Verlag, 2007

==== Fiction ====
- "Schiffe Versenken" ("Killing Ship", under the pseudonym of R.B.van Matturer), Vedra Verlag, 1998
- "Tote leben länger" ("The Dead Live Longer", under the pseudonym of R.B.van Matturer), Vedra Verlag, 1999
- "die zornigen" ("The Enraged"), 2002, Vedra Verlag
- "Mensch Frankenstein" ("Frankenstein the Man"), 2004, Vedra Verlag
- "Der Zug ohne Wiederkehr" ("The train of no return"), 2008, Vedra Verlag

("Schiffe Versenken" and "die zornigen" are illustrated by Russian painter and manga artist Aljoscha Klimov.)

==== Poetry ====
- "The Sleep with the Beautiful Hands", Vedra Verlag, 2003
