= KWTO-FM =

Radio station in Buffalo, Missouri, United States

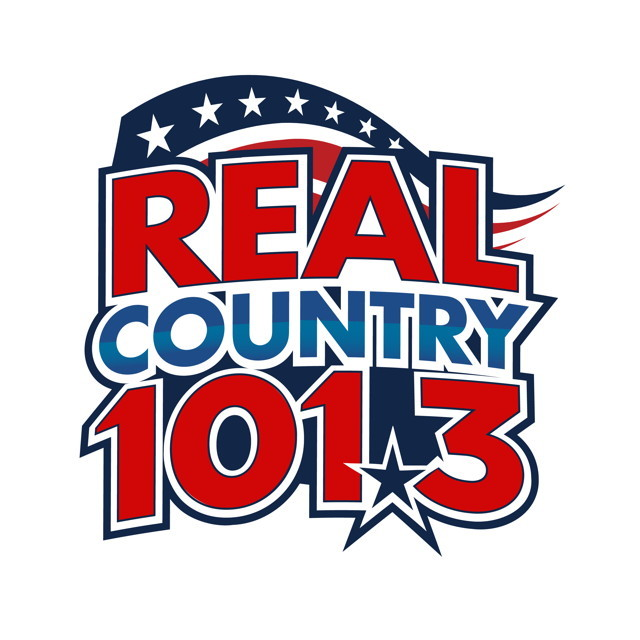
- Buffalo, Missouri; United States
- Broadcast area: Springfield, Missouri
- Frequency: 101.3 MHz (HD Radio)
- Branding: 101.3 Real Country

Programming
- Format: Classic country
- Subchannels: HD2: Smooth jazz

Ownership
- Owner: Zimmer Radio of Mid-Missouri; (Zimmer Midwest Communications, Inc.)
- Sister stations: KBFL; KTXR; KWTO (AM); KZMO

History
- First air date: June 12, 1962 (as KTXR at 101.5)
- Former call signs: KTXR (1962–2020)
- Former frequencies: 101.5 MHz (1962–1993)

Technical information
- Licensing authority: FCC
- Facility ID: 63339
- Class: C
- ERP: 97,800 watts
- HAAT: 453.8 meters (1,489 ft)
- Transmitter coordinates: 37.195°N 92.935°W

Links
- Public license information: Public file; LMS
- Webcast: Listen live
- Website: 1013realcountry.com

KWTO-FM ("101.3 Real Country") is a radio station broadcasting a classic country music format, licensed to Buffalo, Missouri, United States. The station was previously owned by Stereo Broadcasting, a subsidiary of Meyer Communications.

== History ==
As KTXR, the station primarily featured a beautiful music and easy listening format for many years before gradually transitioning to a more contemporary soft adult contemporary sound. It later introduced a new format known as "Timeless Love Songs," which combined classic adult contemporary and soft rock hits with traditional pop standards, contemporary interpretations, and smooth jazz selections. The updated format moved away from current adult contemporary chart hits in favor of artists associated with the contemporary standards genre, including Norah Jones, Michael Bublé, Diana Krall, Queen Latifah, Rod Stewart, and Renee Olstead.

On April 30, 2012, KTXR tweaked its format from soft AC/adult standards to mainstream adult contemporary. After three years in the format and trailing rival KGBX-FM, Meyer announced that it was moving KBFL's southern rock/country hybrid format to KTXR on November 2, 2015, as "101.3 The Outlaw, Genuine Red Dirt Country".

On August 11, 2020, after final completion of the purchase of the group of Springfield radio stations owned by Meyer Communications (KWTO, KWTO-FM, KTXR, KBFL, and KBFL-FM) by Zimmer Midwest Communications, KWTO-FM completed a format change to soft rock with the new moniker "98.7 the Dove". In an additional surprise move, it was announced that Zimmer filed to swap the call letters of 98.7 KWTO-FM with that of 101.3 FM KTXR. "The Dove" immediately began identifying as KTXR. The call sign change was registered by the Federal Communications Commission on August 20. Since KTXR was a prominent part of "The Outlaw" branding, 101.3 FM also continued to identify as KTXR for a short time, with the KWTO-FM call sign only used during hourly station identifications.

On September 17, 2020, 101.3 FM changed its format from red dirt country to classic country, branded as "101.3 Real Country" and began officially identifying as KWTO-FM. Effective June 30, 2022, KWTO-FM moved its community of license from Springfield to Buffalo.

== HD Radio ==
KWTO-FM is licensed for HD Radio operations and features smooth jazz 24 hours a day on its HD2 channel.
