= KXUS =

Mainstream rock radio station in Springfield, Missouri

Coordinates: 37.186°N 93.023°W

- Springfield, Missouri; United States
- Broadcast area: Springfield metropolitan area
- Frequency: 97.3 MHz
- Branding: US97

Programming
- Language: English
- Format: Mainstream rock
- Affiliations: St. Louis Cardinals Radio Network; Westwood One

Ownership
- Owner: iHeartMedia; (iHM Licenses, LLC)
- Sister stations: KGBX-FM; KGMY; KSWF; KTOZ-FM

History
- First air date: April 17, 1969
- Former call signs: KWFC (1969–1985)
- Call sign meaning: US97

Technical information
- Licensing authority: FCC
- Facility ID: 16574
- Class: C1
- ERP: 100,000 watts
- HAAT: 177 meters (581 ft)

Links
- Public license information: Public file; LMS
- Webcast: Listen live (via iHeartRadio)
- Website: us97.iheart.com

KXUS (97.3 FM, "US97") is a radio station broadcasting a mainstream rock format. Licensed to Springfield, Missouri, United States, it serves the Springfield area. The station is currently owned by iHeartMedia and licensed to iHM Licenses, LLC.

== History ==
=== KWFC ===
The Baptist Bible College signed on 97.3 as KWFC on April 17, 1969. The new commercial Christian station aired religious and gospel music, as well as programming from local Baptist churches.

KWFC held a commercial license, and by 1983, Baptist Bible College officials began to look at selling it and obtaining a new non-commercial license for their radio station. In May, Pat Demaree was announced as the buyer of the 97.3 facility for $925,000; the sale would not include any of KWFC's broadcasting equipment, programming, or call letters, while the new owner would get free rent on the tower for 10 years. Demaree's purchase would be complicated, as he had to avoid overlap with KKUZ, his station in Joplin, and the sale was contingent on Baptist Bible College obtaining a new non-commercial license. On September 15, 1983, the Baptist Bible College filed for 94.1 MHz. Two factors combined to make the KWFC sale process last nearly two years. Baptist Bible College's first application for the non-commercial frequency was returned because of a competing bid from Southwest Missouri State University, which ultimately abandoned its push. Then, Stewart Broadcasting—the owners of KWTO radio—filed a petition to deny, claiming that there was overlap between KKUZ and KWFC even though Demaree had moved KKUZ's tower in order to make the purchase of the Springfield station possible. By November 1984, some 18 months after Demaree had agreed to purchase KWFC, Demaree was still waiting for final approval from the Federal Communications Commission.

=== KXUS ===
It was not until January 31, 1985, the deadline after Demaree had extended the option on his agreement, that the FCC approved the Baptist Bible College application for 89.1 MHz and its sale of KWFC at 97.3. Studios were quickly fitted out, and on March 23, 1985, 97.3 relaunched as a CHR/Top 40 outlet KXUS. Baptist Bible College resumed broadcasting on 89.1 FM on April 27.

Branding as The Ozarks' Power Station, The New US 97! KXUS was just the second 100,000-watt commercial station in Springfield, behind KWTO-FM. Its first ratings survey gave it a respectable 10.2 rating for third in the market behind KWTO-FM and KTTS-FM. The station's success was exemplified by the response to a 1986 contest giving away $9,700 and a trip to Puerto Vallarta, which generated so many calls it jammed all of the telephone circuits for Springfield for an hour, halting the contest leading to delayed dial tone-impaired 911 service.

By October 1988, KXUS had shifted into a AOR outlet, leading it to a number-one finish among young adults that year in the Arbitron ratings. Tragedy struck in 1991, when program director Kevin Allen Barton died in a one-vehicle car crash at the age of 45.

However, KXUS's ratings success did not translate to the entire Demaree group. When a bank loan in Cincinnati was called in, Demaree filed for Chapter 11 bankruptcy in February 1992. Matters worsened when ASCAP sued for $100,000 to force KXUS to stop playing songs it represented, saying that the ASCAP license for KXUS had been terminated in April 1991, for nonpayment. In May, Demaree filed to sell several stations, though not KXUS, to Hendren-McChristian Communications, owned by two Arkansas principals.

KXUS would not be sold until 1997, when Sunburst Media, owners of KGBX-FM and KGMY-AM-FM, bought it from Demaree and immediately took over programming. Sunburst in turn sold its entire Springfield cluster, along with its stations in Bryan, Texas, and Abilene, Texas, to Clear Channel (forerunner to iHeartMedia) in 2000, in a $57 million transaction.
