= KGMY =

- Springfield, Missouri; United States
- Broadcast area: Springfield, Missouri
- Frequency: 1400 kHz
- Branding: Fox Sports 1400

Programming
- Format: Sports
- Affiliations: Fox Sports Radio

Ownership
- Owner: iHeartMedia, Inc.; (iHM Licenses, LLC)
- Sister stations: KGBX-FM; KSWF; KTOZ-FM; KXUS

History
- First air date: May 11, 1942
- Former call signs: KTTS (1942–1987); KGBX (1987–1993)

Technical information
- Licensing authority: FCC
- Facility ID: 63886
- Class: C
- Power: 1,000 watts unlimited
- Transmitter coordinates: 37°11′46.2″N 93°19′21.7″W

Links
- Public license information: Public file; LMS
- Webcast: Listen live (via iHeartRadio)
- Website: 1400foxsports.iheart.com

KGMY (1400 AM) is a radio station broadcasting a sports format. Licensed to Springfield, Missouri, United States, it serves the Springfield market. The station is owned by iHeartMedia, Inc., through licensee iHM Licenses, LLC.

KGMY was the ESPN Radio affiliate for Springfield until January 1, 2015. On October 23, 2014, it was announced that KWTO-FM, the market's Fox Sports Radio affiliate, would assume the ESPN Radio affiliation effective January 1, 2015. Fox Sports Radio moved to KGMY on the same date.
