= KGBX-FM =

Adult contemporary radio station in Nixa, Missouri

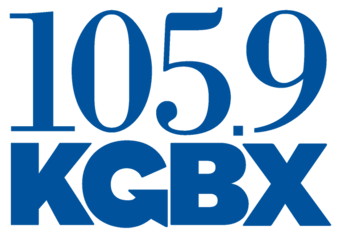
- Nixa, Missouri; United States
- Broadcast area: Springfield, Missouri
- Frequency: 105.9 MHz
- Branding: 105.9 KGBX

Programming
- Format: Adult contemporary
- Affiliations: Premiere Networks

Ownership
- Owner: iHeartMedia, Inc.; (iHM Licenses, LLC)
- Sister stations: KGMY; KSWF; KTOZ-FM; KXUS

History
- First air date: 1968 (as KLTB)
- Former call signs: KLTB (1967–1979); KBLR-FM (1979); KYOO-FM (1979–1989)

Technical information
- Licensing authority: FCC
- Facility ID: 63887
- Class: C2
- ERP: 38,000 watts
- HAAT: 170 meters (560 ft)
- Transmitter coordinates: 37°10′47″N 93°15′39″W

Links
- Public license information: Public file; LMS
- Webcast: Listen live (via iHeartRadio)
- Website: kgbx.iheart.com

KGBX-FM (105.9 MHz) is a radio station broadcasting an adult contemporary format. Licensed to Nixa, Missouri, United States, the station serves the Springfield, Missouri, market. The station is owned by iHeartMedia, Inc., through licensee iHM Licenses, LLC.

== History ==
The station was first licensed as KLTB on February 2, 1968. It changed its call sign to KBLR-FM on April 23, 1979, and to KYOO-FM on July 18, 1979. This station served Bolivar, Missouri, as the FM sister station to KBLR/KYOO (1200 AM), but could be heard in Springfield.

On October 10, 1989, KYOO-FM 106.3 was sold. The station was moved to 105.9 and became KGBX-FM primarily serving Springfield, taking the call letters from KGBX (1400 AM). The city of license was eventually moved from Bolivar to Nixa.
