= KWTO (AM) =

Radio station in Springfield, Missouri

- Springfield, Missouri; United States
- Broadcast area: Southwest Missouri
- Frequency: 560 kHz
- Branding: 93.3 & AM 560 KWTO

Programming
- Format: Talk radio
- Network: Fox News Radio
- Affiliations: Compass Media Networks; Premiere Networks; Salem Radio Network; Westwood One

Ownership
- Owner: Zimmer Radio of Mid-Missouri; (Zimmer Midwest Communications, Inc.)
- Sister stations: KWTO-FM; KTXR

History
- First air date: December 25, 1933
- Call sign meaning: "Keep Watching The Ozarks"

Technical information
- Licensing authority: FCC
- Facility ID: 35900
- Class: B
- Power: 5,000 watts day; 4,000 watts night
- Transmitter coordinates: 36°56′40.2″N 93°13′17.7″W
- Translator: 93.3 K227AO (Springfield)

Links
- Public license information: Public file; LMS
- Webcast: Listen live
- Website: 933kwto.com

KWTO (560 kHz) is a commercial AM radio station in Springfield, Missouri. It is owned by Zimmer Midwest Communications and airs a talk radio format. The studios and offices are on East Chestnut Expressway in Springfield.

KWTO is powered at 5,000 watts by day and 4,000 watts at night. It uses a directional antenna with a five-tower array. The transmitter is off Tower Lane in Ozark, Missouri, near U.S. Route 65. The signal reaches parts of Missouri, Arkansas, Kansas and Oklahoma. It provides at least secondary coverage as far north as Kansas City, as far west as Tulsa and as far south as Fort Smith. Programming is also heard on 250 watt FM translator 93.3 K227AO.

== Programming ==
Weekday mornings begin with Wake Up Missouri hosted by Randy Tobler, Stephanie Bell and John Marsh. Afternoon drive time is hosted by Elijah Haahr. The rest of the weekday schedule is made up of nationally syndicated conservative talk programs: The Erick Erickson Show, The Clay Travis and Buck Sexton Show, The Gary Nolan Show, Fox Across America with Jimmy Failla, The Jesse Kelly Show, Coast to Coast AM with George Noory and This Morning, America's First News with Gordon Deal.

Weekends feature shows on money, health, law enforcement, guns, home repair and religion, as well as repeats of weekday shows. Weekend programs include The Chris Plante Show, Our American Stories with Lee Habeeb and Sunday Nights with Bill Cunningham. World and national news is provided by Fox News Radio.

== History ==
=== 56 Country ===
KWTO was founded by local businessman Lester E. Cox and began broadcasting on December 25, 1933. Cox applied for and got the call sign KWTO, which stands for "Keep Watching The Ozarks". The studios were at 600 St. Louis Street in Springfield, Missouri. Cox also applied for several other licenses including KCMO in Kansas City. At the time the Federal Radio Commission prohibited playing recorded music on the air, so the station had its own live bands.

From the 1930s through the 1950s, KWTO's staff musicians included Slim Wilson and the Tall Timber Trio, Chet Atkins, The Carter Family, Wynn Stewart, Les Paul, The Haden Family and The Goodwill Family. KWTO's Korn's-A-Krackin', a weekly "hillbilly variety" program, was carried nationally by the Mutual Broadcasting System. During the late 1940s and 1950s, the station played a key role in launching the careers of stars such as Porter Wagoner and The Browns. In 1954, the station began airing a country music and bluegrass show, Ozark Jubilee. Because KWTO was a network affiliate of ABC Radio, the Jubillee became an ABC-TV and radio network show. In 1959, KWTO broke with its live music tradition and began playing country music records. For the next 30 years, it was known as "56 Country".

=== News/talk ===
By the 1980s, country music listeners were shifting to the FM band for to hear their songs. On October 22, 1990, KWTO ended its long-standing country format and became the region's first full-time news-talk station. It carried popular national hosts including Rush Limbaugh, Jim Bohannon (who once worked at the station), and Joe Pags.

With his 2008 album Rambling Boy, Charlie Haden acknowledged KWTO's country roots by featuring the station's transmission tower on the album's cover. On December 10, 2008, Rep. Roy Blunt recognized the station's 75th anniversary with remarks from the floor of United States House of Representatives.

=== Change in ownership ===
On July 24, 2020, Meyer Communications announced it was selling its radio stations (KWTO, KWTO-FM, KTXR, KBFL, and KBFL-FM) to Zimmer Midwest Communications. The new owners kept the news-talk format in place.

The station was formerly an affiliate of CBS Radio News. On January 5, 2024, Zimmer Midwest Communications announced that KWTO would become an affiliate of Fox News Radio beginning on January 8, 2024.
