= WLZD-LP =

- Hazard, Kentucky; United States
- Broadcast area: Perry County, Kentucky
- Frequency: 106.1 MHz
- Branding: 106.1 The Lizard

Programming
- Format: Classic Rock

Ownership
- Owner: Hazard Community Broadcasting

History
- First air date: 2005
- Former call signs: WYZQ-LP (2005–2009); WRZD-LP (2009); WLZD-LP (2009–Present); WRZD-LP (2010)

Technical information
- Licensing authority: FCC
- Facility ID: 135664
- Class: L1
- ERP: 100 watts
- HAAT: 203.4 meters
- Transmitter coordinates: 37°16′57.00″N 83°13′5.70″W

Links
- Public license information: LMS
- Website: http://snakesaddler.wixsite.com/wlzdthelizard

WLZD-LP (106.1 FM) is an American low-power FM radio station licensed to Hazard, Kentucky. The station is currently owned by Hazard Community Broadcasting.

== Notable Former On-Air Staff ==
On-Air Staff Name	Years active
Randy Walters	2004–2014
Chris Hall	2015
Jon Colwell	2015–2017
Jack Caudill	2015–2017
Matt Duff	2015–2017
Travis Hall	2017–2018
Shea Graham	2017–2018
Zack Mullins	2017–2018
Jakob Terry	2017–2018
James Stacy	2017–2018
Jody Fugate	2015–2018
Patrick Feltner	2017–2018
Nathaniel Brock	2017–2018
Crystal Jones	2017–2018
