= Peter C. Whybrow =

English psychiatrist and author (1939–2025)

Peter Charles Whybrow (13 June 1939 – 25 August 2025) was an English psychiatrist and award-winning author whose primary research focus was on understanding the metabolic role of thyroid hormones in the adult brain and how to apply this knowledge to the treatment of mood disorder, especially bipolar disorder. He was Judson Braun Distinguished Professor in the Department of Psychiatry and Biobehavioral Sciences of the David Geffen School of Medicine at UCLA.

== Birth ==
Whybrow was born 13 June 1939 in Hatfield, Hertfordshire.

== Education and career ==
Whybrow was a graduate of University College, and University College Hospital Medical School, London. He received his training in endocrinology and psychiatry in London and North Carolina and was a member of the scientific staff of the British Medical Research Council before migrating to America in the 1970s to join the faculty of Dartmouth Medical School where he was chair of psychiatry and later executive dean of the medical school. In 1984 he was appointed the Ruth Meltzer Professor and chair of psychiatry at the University of Pennsylvania. Between 1997 and 2020 Whybrow served as executive chair of psychiatry, Director of the Semel Institute for Neuroscience and Human Behavior, and CEO of the Resnick Hospital at UCLA.

He was a founding member and Fellow of the Royal College of Psychiatrists, Fellow of the American Association for the Advancement of Science, the American College of Psychiatrists, and a Distinguished Fellow of the American Psychiatric Association. An advisor to universities, foundations, and government agencies, Whybrow has also been a Fellow at the Center for Advanced Study at Stanford, and a visiting fellow at The Queen's College, Oxford.

== Academic contributions ==
Whybrow's primary research contribution has been to improve the understanding of the metabolic role of thyroid hormones in the adult brain, and to apply that knowledge to investigation of the pathophysiology and clinical treatment of mood disorder, especially bipolar disorder. His extensive research has documented that some patients with affective illness may have a brain specific abnormality of thyroid metabolism that adversely modifies the expression of affective illness.

Whybrow has pioneered the use of self-rating systems in mental illness together with Michael Bauer and Tasha Glenn. In the 1970s he developed the Chronorecord, which is an electronically based daily self-rating system through which patients may follow the course of their illness and recovery in accurate correlation with treatment intervention, thus facilitating long term therapeutic management. The Chronorecord has been translated into six languages and collaborative studies are ongoing in Germany, Canada, Australia and the UK.

As an author Whybrow is best known for a trilogy of books exploring the impact of modern-day culture on human behavior. In 2005, he was awarded the Ken National Book Award by the National Alliance on Mental Illness and the Gradiva Award in 2006 by the National Association for the Advancement of Psychoanalysis for his book American Mania. In 2008, he was awarded the Silver Ribbon Science Leadership Award by NARSAD for his leadership and commitment in advancing research on mental illnesses.

== Death ==
Whybrow died in Waitsfield, Vermont, on 25 August 2025, at the age of 86.

== Bibliography ==
- Lipowski, Z. J., Lipsitt, D., Whybrow, P. C. (eds.) (1977) Psychosomatic Medicine: Current Trends and Clinical Applications. Oxford University Press.
- Whybrow, P. C., Akiskal, H., McKinney (1984) Mood Disorders: Toward a New Psychobiology. W. J., Plenum Press, New York.
- Whybrow, P. C. & Bahr, R. (1988) The Hibernation Response. Arbor House, New York.
- Whybrow, P. C. (1997) A Mood Apart: Depression, Mania, and Other Afflictions of the Self. HarperCollins/Basic Books, New York.
- Whybrow, P. C. (2005) American Mania: When More Is Not Enough. W.W. Norton & Company, Inc.
- Whybrow, P. C. (2015) The Well-Tuned Brain. W.W. Norton & Company, Inc.
