= Marc Paskin =

American multi-millionaire

Marc Paskin is an American multi-millionaire from La Jolla, California. Formerly in the real estate industry, Paskin later became known for partaking in various forms of charitable activities.

== Personal life ==
Paskin is originally from La Jolla, San Diego, CA, but he currently resides in Kailua, Oahu, Hawaii. Previously he was married to his wife, Marsha, for 28 years. She died in 2002 from diabetes complications. He has two adult children.

== Media appearances ==
Paskin appeared on an episode of the reality series Secret Millionaire, where he traveled to Detroit to provide money to those in need. Paskin has also performed charitable activities in Hawaii under the alias "Uncle Kokua"—primarily in a self-titled reality series airing on local station KFVE-TV.

In December 2012, Paskin gained prominence after put up a billboard in Barrio Logan, San Diego soliciting for a "Latina girlfriend" for Christmas. He claimed he received around 15,000 emails in response to the billboard.

In 2015, Paskin entered the broadcasting industry by acquiring Golden, Colorado radio station KDCO and FM translator K231BQ, and converting it to a cannabis culture-themed classic rock station known as KBUD. By November, the station and translator had been sold to Marconi Wireless (who relaunched the translator as a new station in April 2016) and iHeartMedia (who converted the translator to a feed of KOA) respectively.
