= KDMT (AM) =

Relevant Radio station in Denver

- Arvada, Colorado; United States
- Broadcast area: Denver metropolitan area
- Frequency: 1690 kHz

Programming
- Language: English
- Format: Catholic radio
- Network: Relevant Radio

Ownership
- Owner: Relevant Radio Inc.

History
- First air date: June 3, 1998
- Former call signs: KAYK (1997–1998); KADZ (1998–1999); KDDZ (1999–2015)
- Call sign meaning: Denver Money Talk (former branding)

Technical information
- Licensing authority: FCC
- Facility ID: 86619
- Class: B
- Power: 10,000 watts (day); 1,000 watts (night)
- Transmitter coordinates: 39°39′21″N 105°4′28.9″W

Links
- Public license information: Public file; LMS
- Webcast: Listen live
- Website: www.relevantradio.com

KDMT (1690 AM) is a radio station licensed to Arvada, Colorado, and serving the Denver metropolitan area radio market. The station is owned by Relevant Radio, Inc., and broadcasts a Catholic radio format, as part of the Relevant Radio network.

== History ==
KDMT originated as the expanded band "twin" of an existing station on the standard AM band. On March 17, 1997, the Federal Communications Commission (FCC) announced that 88 stations had been given permission to move to newly available "Expanded Band" transmitting frequencies, ranging from 1610 to 1700 kHz. In Arvada, Colorado, KQXI was authorized to move from 1550 to 1690 kHz. A construction permit for the expanded band station was assigned the call letters KAYK on November 10.

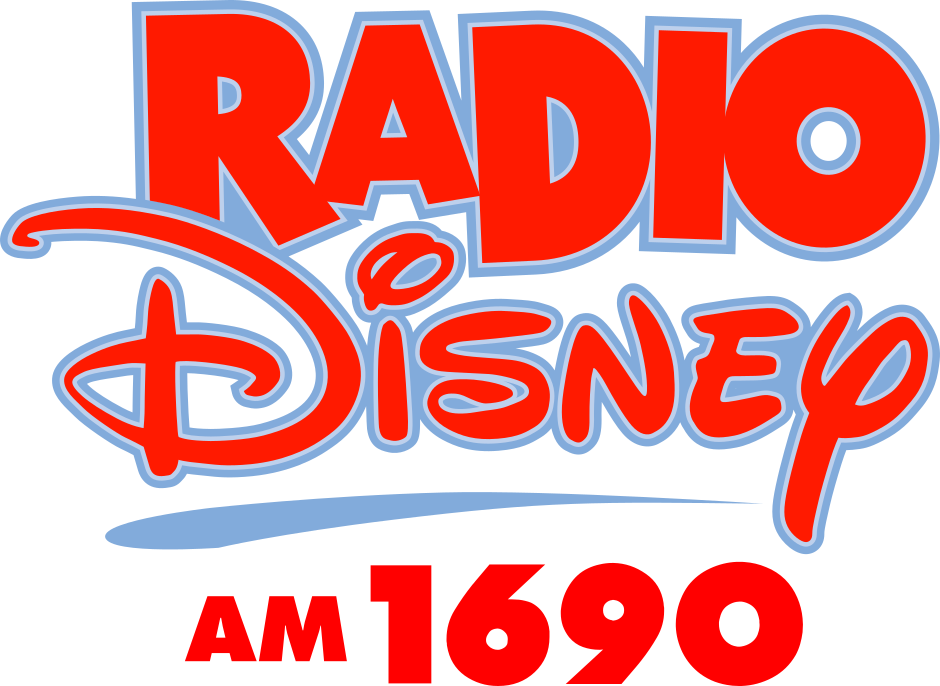
KDDZ logo used from 2002 until 2007.

In June 1998, Radio Property Ventures sold the KAYK construction permit for 1690 AM and KQXI on 1550 AM for $3.5 million to ABC Radio, at a time when the company was buying stations for the Radio Disney network. KAYK began operations on June 3, and the simulcasting by 1550 AM and 1690 AM began carrying Radio Disney programming. After the sale closed in late 1998, the stations took on new Disney-inspired call letters on December 11, as 1690 AM changed to KADZ while 1550 AM became KDDZ. On January 15, 1999, these call letters were swapped, with 1690 AM becoming KDDZ and 1550 AM changing to KADZ.

The FCC's initial policy for expanded band assignments was that both the original station and its expanded band counterpart could operate simultaneously for up to five years, after which owners would have to turn in one of the two licenses, depending on whether they preferred the new assignment or elected to remain on the original frequency. ABC chose to retain the expanded band frequency, and KADZ on 1550 AM was deleted by the FCC on November 18, 2003.

On August 13, 2014, The Walt Disney Company put KDDZ and 22 other Radio Disney stations up for sale, to focus on digital distribution of the Radio Disney network. On September 15, 2015, it was announced that the Salem Media Group had acquired the last five Radio Disney owned-and-operated stations for sale (including KDDZ) for $2.225 million. KDDZ was acquired through Salem Media of Colorado, Inc., for $550,000. According to RadioInsight, KDDZ would become Salem's Wall Street Business Network affiliate in Denver. The sale was completed on December 8. The call sign was changed to KDMT and the station began stunting with music by Johnny Cash as "Cash Country 1690". The stunt led into the launch of "Money Talk 1690" on February 1, 2016.

On November 14, 2019, the station was sold to Immaculate Heart Media, Inc., and it became an affiliate of Relevant Radio.
