= KFEZ =

Radio station in Walsenburg–Pueblo, Colorado

- Walsenburg, Colorado; United States
- Broadcast area: Pueblo, Colorado; Walsenburg, Colorado; Rocky Ford, Colorado; Colorado Springs, Colorado
- Frequency: 101.3 MHz
- Branding: Gnarly 101.3

Programming
- Format: 80s hits

Ownership
- Owner: Edward Magnus

History
- First air date: 2009
- Former call signs: KWCS (2005–2008); KOCK (2008–2012)
- Call sign meaning: Station had an easy (EZ) listening format

Technical information
- Licensing authority: FCC
- Facility ID: 164170
- Class: C1
- ERP: 95,500 watts
- HAAT: 305 meters (1,001 ft)
- Transmitter coordinates: 37°47′20″N 104°29′12″W

Links
- Public license information: Public file; LMS

KFEZ (101.3 FM) is a 95,500-watt radio station licensed to Walsenburg, Colorado broadcasting an all 80s music format. KFEZ serves the areas of Pueblo, Walsenburg, Rocky Ford, and Colorado Springs, Colorado. KFEZ is owned by Edward Magnus. The station has been off the air since 2020.

== History ==
Former logo

The station signed on the air on January 7, 2009, as KOCK with a rock format.

On April 22, 2010, KOCK went silent.

On April 26, 2012, the station returned to the air as KFEZ with a soft AC format, branded as "Easy 101.3".

On September 1, 2015, KFEZ changed their format from soft AC to sports, branded as "ESPN The Rock".

On December 15, 2015, KFEZ changed their format back to soft AC, branded as "Easy 101.3".

In January 2017, KFEZ changed their format to country as "Kiq'n Country," previously heard on KIQN 103.3.

On June 5, 2017, KFEZ changed their format to oldies, branded as "Cruisin' KFEZ 101.3 FM."

On March 31, 2019, KFEZ launched a Facebook page for its new All-'80s format, branded as "Gnarly 101.3."

Current live shows on Gnarly 101.3

Saturday 2pm-4pm "Ladies Of The 80's" with Marissa. Sunday 8am-10am "Easy Like Sunday Morning" with Joel Navarro. Sunday 10am-12pm "Back To The Gr80s" with Missi and Paul. Sunday 3pm-6pm "Gnarly Grooves" with Big Len.
