= KWRP =

Radio station in Pueblo, Colorado

- Pueblo, Colorado; United States
- Broadcast area: Pueblo-Colorado Springs
- Frequency: 690 kHz (HD Radio)
- Branding: Cruisin Oldies 100.3 FM & AM 690

Programming
- Format: Rhythmic oldies

Ownership
- Owner: Michael Hernandez; (Western Radio, Ltd.)
- Sister stations: KFEZ

History
- First air date: April 1959
- Former call signs: KAPI (1959–1981); KRMX (1981–2009); KSIP (2009)
- Call sign meaning: "We Are Pueblo"

Technical information
- Licensing authority: FCC
- Facility ID: 69871
- Class: D
- Power: 250 watts (day); 24 watts (night)
- Transmitter coordinates: 38°17′48″N 104°38′47″W
- Translator: See § Translators

Links
- Public license information: Public file; LMS
- Webcast: Listen live (via TuneIn)
- Website: KWRP on Facebook

KWRP (690 AM, "Cruisin Oldies") is a commercial radio station licensed to Pueblo, Colorado, United States. It airs a rhythmic oldies format and is owned by Michael Hernandez, through licensee Western Radio, Ltd. The transmitter is off Oak Street in Pueblo.

KWRP also broadcasts on two FM translators: K262BB at 100.3 MHz and K230BZ at 93.9 MHz.

== Translators ==
In addition to the main station, KWRP is relayed by an additional translator to widen its broadcast area.

Call sign	Frequency	City of license	FID	ERP (W)	Class	Transmitter coordinates	FCC info
K262BB	100.3 FM	Boone, Colorado	140721	99	D	38°17′48″N 104°38′47″W	LMS
K230BZ	93.9 FM	Pueblo, Colorado	143122	250	D	38°06′22″N 104°29′20″W	LMS
