= KKCL (AM) =

Radio station in Golden, Colorado

- Golden, Colorado; United States
- Broadcast area: Golden, Colorado; Boulder, Colorado; Denver, Colorado
- Frequency: 1550 kHz
- Branding: 96.9 The Cloud

Programming
- Format: Adult contemporary and adult album alternative

Ownership
- Owner: Mainstreet Media of Colorado, LLC

History
- First air date: 2014
- Former call signs: KGCQ (2011–2012); KDCO (2012–2015); KBUD (2015–2016)
- Call sign meaning: "Cloud"

Technical information
- Licensing authority: FCC
- Facility ID: 161314
- Class: B
- Power: 1,000 watts (day); 210 watts (night)
- Transmitter coordinates: 39°46′1″N 105°7′24″W
- Translators: 96.9 K245AD (Boulder); 96.9 K245CM (Golden)

Links
- Public license information: Public file; LMS
- Webcast: Listen live
- Website: http://thecloud.fm

KKCL (1550 AM) is a commercial radio station licensed to Golden, Colorado, United States, and serving the Denver/Boulder market. The station airs a modern AC/adult album alternative format branded as The Cloud. The station had previously spent time as a sports radio station and a cannabis culture-themed classic rock station known as Smokin' 94.1.

Because 1550 kHz is a clear channel frequency reserved for Canada and Mexico, KKCL's night power is limited. To improve its coverage, programming also airs on FM translators K245AD and K245CM, both at 96.9 MHz.

== History ==
=== Mile High Sports ===
The station first signed on in 2014 as KDCO, reactivating the 1550 frequency vacated in 2003 when KADZ in Arvada left the air. Until June 1, 2015, the station was the home for Mile High Sports, a multimedia sports-marketing and publishing company based in Denver via a partnership with Kroenke Sports and Entertainment. Mile High Sports was the radio flagship for the Denver Nuggets basketball team, Colorado Avalanche hockey team, Colorado Mammoth, and Colorado Rapids. The station also broadcast the Falcons' football and basketball from the Air Force Academy and syndicated National Football League games through the Sports USA Radio Network.

The station was also partnered with KCKK, which was the flagship of Mile High Sports until it flipped to adult hits in March 2014. Later it partnered with Lincoln Financial Media outlet KKFN for sharing Nuggets and Avalanche games, while leasing out KQKS' HD2 sub-channel to cover the Denver-Boulder area that its FM translator can not reach.

On November 4, 2014, Advance Modulation sold KDCO/K231BQ to 4K's LLLP for $550,000, pending FCC approval. The sale closed on February 5, 2015. On May 22, 2015, KDCO/K231BQ temporarily went off the air after it was sold to Marco Broadcasting, owned by Marc Paskin, who acquired the station in March 2015 from 4K. The purchase by Marco Broadcasting closed on May 20, 2015, at a price of $875,000.

=== Smokin' 94.1 ===
On June 1, 2015, the station flipped to a marijuana-themed classic rock format, branded as Smokin 94.1 (referring to its FM translator), and changed its call letters to KBUD. The format was aimed at the region's cannabis culture; Paskin himself served as the drive-time host under the alias "Gary Ganja" (and performed a news update at 4:20 p.m as "O.G. Kush"), and call-in segments involved cannabis-oriented topics. The station picked up syndicated Bubba the Love Sponge as its morning show (owing to its namesake's support of marijuana legalization), and played clips from stoner films as well as comedy sketches recorded by Paskin. Paskin explained that the format was meant to be a throwback to the "old days of radio", stating that "radio has become boring, it's corporate-controlled, every station sounds alike. If you tell a weird joke, they'll fire you." The station did not carry advertising, primarily due to potential legal issues involving the advertising of cannabis and related products, as cannabis is illegal under federal law.

On October 23, 2015, the K231BQ translator was sold to iHeartMedia, who converted it to an FM simulcast of KOA on November 1, 2015. KBUD itself would go silent on the same day. A KBUD personality explained that the sale was related to health problems being faced by Paskin.

=== 96.9 The Cloud ===
In November 2015, KBUD was sold to Marconi Wireless of Colorado, with the new owners intending to launch a new station known as "The Cloud".

The station changed its call sign to KKCL on January 13, 2016. The sale to Marconi Wireless was consummated on February 17, 2016, at a price of $125,000. On February 29, 2016, KKCL returned to the air, coupled with an FM translator station on 96.9, carrying a Modern AC/AAA format, branded as "The Cloud". One May 23, 2016, Marconi Wireless owner Chuck Lontine transferred the license for KKCL to Mainstreet Media of Colorado, LLC, also wholly owned by Lontine. On November 11, 2016, Main Street added a second FM translator license in Golden, Colorado. According to FCC filings, Main Street moved this new translator from Gunnison, Colorado under the AM Revitalization Act. The purchase price was $30,000.00. The additional translator added substantial coverage into the western suburbs of the Denver/Boulder radio market.
