= KMZR =

Radio station in Atwater, California

- Atwater, California; United States
- Broadcast area: Merced, California
- Frequency: 92.5 MHz
- Branding: Radio Lazer 92.5

Programming
- Format: Regional Mexican

Ownership
- Owner: Lazer Media; (Lazer Licenses, LLC)
- Sister stations: KGAM

History
- First air date: April 15, 1997
- Former call signs: KVRQ (1991); KVRK (1991); KVRQ (1991–1999); KJMQ (1999–2002); KBRE (2002–2016)

Technical information
- Licensing authority: FCC
- Facility ID: 11707
- Class: A
- ERP: 6,000 watts
- HAAT: 100 meters (330 ft)
- Transmitter coordinates: 37°16′40.8″N 120°37′38.7″W

Links
- Public license information: Public file; LMS
- Website: radiolazer.com/index.php/merced

KMZR is a Regional Mexican formatted broadcast radio station licensed to Atwater, California, serving Merced, California. KMZR is owned and operated by Alfredo Plascencia's Lazer Media, through licensee Lazer Licenses, LLC.

== History ==
The station was assigned the call letters KVRQ on April 15, 1991. On July 16, 1991, the station changed its call sign to KVRK, on July 18, 1991, to KVRQ, on April 30, 1999, to KJMQ, on February 2, 2012, to KBRE, and on May 4, 2016, to the current KMZR.

On May 4, 2016, Radio Lazer changed call letters to KMZR and flipped its format to Regional Mexican; the previous active rock format was moved with the KBRE call letters to 1660 AM and 105.7 FM.
