= WKCB-FM =

- Hindman, Kentucky; United States
- Frequency: 107.1 MHz
- Branding: 107.1 WKCB

Programming
- Format: Classic hits
- Affiliations: Fox News Radio

Ownership
- Owner: Hindman Broadcasting Corporation

History
- First air date: December 13, 1974

Technical information
- Licensing authority: FCC
- Facility ID: 27249
- Class: A
- ERP: 1,550 watts
- HAAT: 198 meters
- Transmitter coordinates: 37°19′56″N 82°56′52″W

Links
- Public license information: Public file; LMS

WKCB-FM (107.1 FM) is a radio station broadcasting a classic hits format. Licensed to Hindman, Kentucky, United States. The station is currently owned by Hindman Broadcasting Corporation and features programming from Fox News Radio.
