= KGAM (FM) =

Radio station in Merced, California

Coordinates: 37.4263°N 120.4413°W

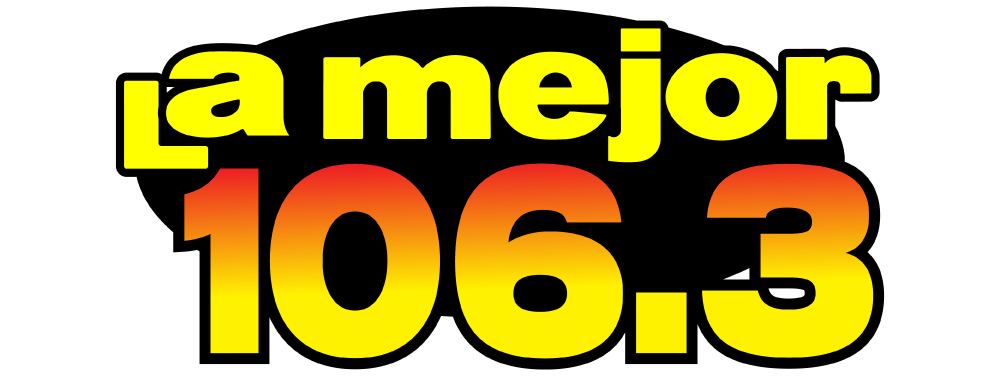
- Merced, California; United States
- Broadcast area: Merced area
- Frequency: 106.3 MHz
- Branding: La Mejor 106.3

Programming
- Language: Spanish
- Format: Adult contemporary

Ownership
- Owner: Lazer Media; (Lazer Licenses, LLC)
- Sister stations: KMZR

History
- Former call signs: KBCY (1986–1989); KDAT (1989–1992); KFIE (1992–1996); KIBG (1996–2004); KHPO (2004–2007); KNAH (2007–2010)

Technical information
- Licensing authority: FCC
- Facility ID: 15099
- Class: A
- ERP: 4,000 watts
- HAAT: 123 meters (404 ft)

Links
- Public license information: Public file; LMS

KGAM (106.3 FM) is a radio station broadcasting a Spanish adult contemporary format, licensed to Merced, California, United States. It is owned by Alfredo Plascencia's Lazer Media, through the licensee Lazer Licenses, LLC.

== History ==
The station was previously known as the English adult contemporary station "Magic 106.3", and earlier as the country station KNAH "Hank 106.3". Before that, the station was known as KHPO "106.3 The Hippo", which was a classic hits station, and before that KIBG "Big 106.3" which played a hot adult contemporary format, then became adult contemporary.
