= KZMO =

- Fair Grove, Missouri; United States
- Broadcast area: Springfield, Missouri
- Frequency: 93.7 MHz
- Branding: 93.7 The Stage

Programming
- Format: Country

Ownership
- Owner: Zimmer Radio of Mid-Missouri; (Zimmer Midwest Communications, Inc.)
- Sister stations: KBFL

History
- First air date: September 6, 1965
- Former call signs: KBFL-FM (1965–2025)
- Former frequencies: 91.3 MHz (1965–1967); 90.3 MHz (1967–1989); 99.9 MHz (1989–2025)

Technical information
- Licensing authority: FCC
- Facility ID: 33654
- Class: A
- ERP: 1,100 watts
- HAAT: 185 meters (607 ft)
- Transmitter coordinates: 37°13′24.8″N 93°14′30.5″W

Links
- Public license information: Public file; LMS
- Webcast: Listen live
- Website: 937thestage.com

KZMO (93.7 FM) is a radio station licensed to Fair Grove, Missouri, United States. It is owned by Zimmer Radio and airs a country music format known as 93.7 The Stage.

== History ==
=== KBFL at Buffalo High School ===
This facility began as a 10-watt non-commercial educational radio station at Buffalo, Missouri. On January 14, 1965, the School District No. 1 Dallas County received a construction permit to build such a station on 91.3 MHz. The station began broadcasting September 6, 1965, as KBFL. It operated from Buffalo High School for 15 hours a day. At the time, it was the only high school radio station in Missouri. It offered local programming, news, sports coverage, and music to an area that had not previously had nighttime radio service. It moved to 90.3 MHz in 1967 with an effective radiated power of 1,160 watts. By 1973, 40 juniors and seniors were involved in station operations alongside five professional staffers, and it was the only high school radio station to be a member of NPR.

In the mid-1970s, the school board and station management disputed aspects of KBFL's operations, including editorial comment during newscasts. Station manager Wayne Lemons was transferred from the position by the school board in a surprise action. At the meeting where the school board rejected Lemons's attempt to get his job back, 400 of the 2,000 residents of Buffalo were in attendance.

KBFL's format varied based on student tastes. In 1984, it switched from a rock format to a more conservatively programmed format to increase listenership and revenue as budget cuts were necessary to reduce the school board's share of expenses, including dropping the NPR program carried by the station. In 1987, the school board applied to move KBFL-FM to 99.9 MHz and change its status to commercial. It hoped this would increase revenue by permitting full commercials and not just underwriting spots and improve the accuracy of job training for students. Another group, a couple from Olathe, Kansas, also applied for the frequency. The change in frequency and status took place in June 1989. During this time, the station aired country music, but student interest dwindled until it reinstated nighttime rock music.

=== Private ownership ===
In 1992, voters failed to approve a school tax levy for Dallas County. The board voted to sell KBFL and cut the teacher associated with the program. The Dallas County school district sold the station for $65,060 to Charles Burton, a former reporter for KOLR television in Springfield. By 2000, it was owned by Ken Meyer alongside KTXR (101.3 FM) and KWTO (560 AM).

On March 2, 2015, KBFL-FM flipped to the "Outlaw Nation" format; the Music of Your Life format moved to KBFL. However, due to the overwhelming response of the format, Meyer announced that "The Outlaw" had moved to sister station KTXR November 2, 2015. A new format launched on KBFL-FM on the same day: a simulcast of adult standards-formatted KBFL (1060 AM).

On July 24, 2020, it was announced that the Jock sports format on KBFL’s sister station KWTO-FM 98.7 would be moving to the KBFL frequencies and that the entire group of Meyer Communications owned radio stations were being purchased by Zimmer Midwest Communications. KBFL began simulcasting KWTO-FM on July 30.

On September 7, 2025, KBFL-FM moved from 99.9 MHz to 93.7 MHz; changed its city of license from Buffalo to Fair Grove; and changed its format from a simulcast of KBFL to country, branded as "93.7 The Stage", under new KZMO call letters.
