= KSWF =

Coordinates: 37.094°N 93.518°W

- Aurora, Missouri; United States
- Broadcast area: Springfield, Missouri
- Frequency: 100.5 MHz
- Branding: "100.5 The Wolf"

Programming
- Format: Country

Ownership
- Owner: iHeartMedia, Inc.; (iHM Licenses, LLC)

History
- First air date: 1984
- Former call signs: KGMY-FM (1984–2005)

Technical information
- Licensing authority: FCC
- Facility ID: 3258
- Class: C2
- ERP: 33,000 watts
- HAAT: 183 meters

Links
- Public license information: Public file; LMS
- Webcast: Listen Live
- Website: https://1005thewolf.iheart.com/

KSWF (100.5 FM) is a radio station broadcasting a country format. Licensed to Aurora, Missouri, United States, it serves the Springfield, Missouri, area. The station is currently owned by iHeartMedia, Inc. and licensed as iHM Licenses, LLC. The station is the former KGMY-FM and used to brand itself as "MyCountry 100.5," but later rebranded as "100.5 The Wolf."
