= KBFL (AM) =

- Springfield, Missouri; United States
- Broadcast area: Springfield, Missouri
- Frequency: 1060 kHz
- Branding: 96.9 the JOCK

Programming
- Format: Sports
- Affiliations: ESPN Radio

Ownership
- Owner: Zimmer Radio of Mid-Missouri; (Zimmer Midwest Communications, Inc.)
- Sister stations: KZMO

History
- First air date: 1972 (as KBUG)
- Former call signs: KBUG (1972–1981); KLSM (1981–1986); KTOZ (1986–2006)
- Call sign meaning: Buffalo (former city of license for KZMO)

Technical information
- Licensing authority: FCC
- Facility ID: 17022
- Class: D
- Power: 470 watts day; 19 watts night
- Transmitter coordinates: 37°13′33.2″N 93°21′33.7″W
- Translator: 96.9 K245CA (Springfield)

Links
- Public license information: Public file; LMS
- Webcast: Listen live
- Website: 969thejock.com

KBFL (1060 kHz) is an AM radio station broadcasting a sports format. KBFL is also heard on translator K245CA 96.9 FM. The station is licensed to Springfield, Missouri, and is owned by Zimmer Radio of Mid-Missouri.

== History ==
In 1995, the station (KTOZ) found itself at the center of an investigation about using volunteer labor.

The station throughout most of its history had an adult standards format from the Music of Your Life network. From September 1, 2013, through March 2, 2015, KBFL broadcast a smooth jazz format.

KBFL was previously owned by Meyer-Baldridge, Inc. (d/b/a Meyer Communications). On July 24, 2020, it was announced that the sports talk format on KBFL’s sister station KWTO-FM would be moving to KBFL and KBFL-FM, and that the entire group of Meyer Communications owned radio stations were being purchased by Zimmer Midwest Communications. KBFL began simulcasting KWTO-FM on July 30, and unveiled a new logo reflecting the new frequencies "JOCK 96.9 FM 99.9 FM 1060 AM". ESPN on air promos branded the station as “ESPN the JOCK”. As of August 7, 2020, "ESPN the JOCK" fully transitioned to KBFL and KBFL-FM and its 96.9 FM translator; 98.7 FM began broadcasting a soft rock format on August 11.
