= KKFN =

Sports radio station in Longmont–Denver, Colorado

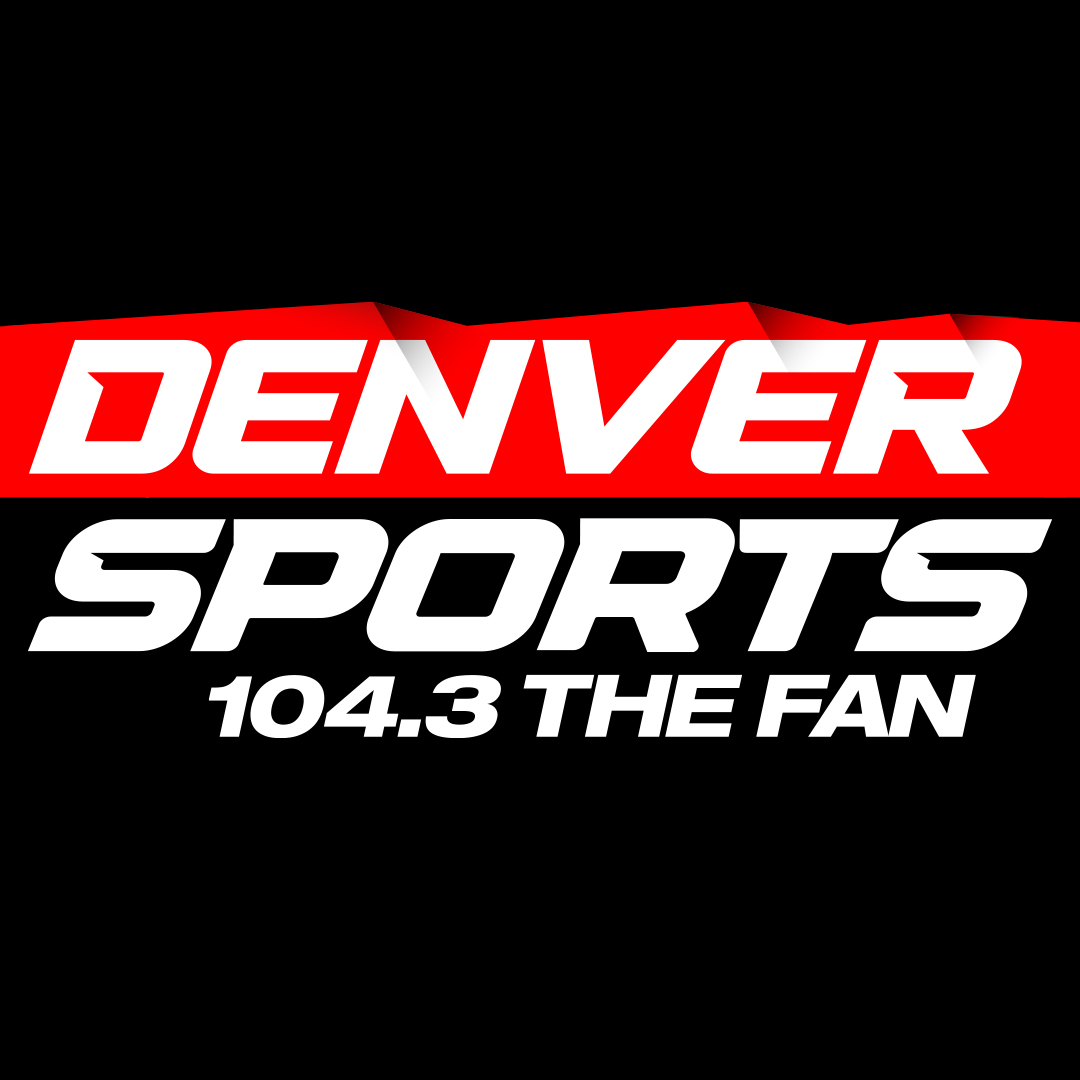
- Longmont, Colorado; United States
- Broadcast area: Denver metro area
- Frequency: 104.3 MHz (HD Radio)
- Branding: Denver's Sports 104.3 The Fan

Programming
- Language: English
- Format: Sports
- Subchannels: HD2: Sports (KEPN)
- Affiliations: ESPN Radio

Ownership
- Owner: Bonneville International; (Bonneville International Corporation)
- Sister stations: KEPN; KOSI; KYGO-FM

History
- First air date: September 1964; 61 years ago (as KLMO-FM)
- Former call signs: KLMO-FM (1964–1986); KQKS (1986–1997); KCKK (1997–1999); KCKK-FM (1999–2000); KJCD (2000–2008)
- Call sign meaning: "Fan"

Technical information
- Licensing authority: FCC
- Facility ID: 71767
- Class: C1
- ERP: 91,000 watts
- HAAT: 206 meters (676 ft)
- Transmitter coordinates: 39.6958°N 105.1655°W

Links
- Public license information: Public file; LMS
- Webcast: Listen live; Listen live (via Audacy)
- Website: denversports.com

KKFN (104.3 FM, "Denver Sports 104.3 The Fan") is a commercial radio station serving the Denver-Boulder market. Owned and operated by Salt Lake City–based Bonneville International, KKFN airs a sports radio format. The station is licensed in Longmont, Colorado. Its studios are located in Greenwood Village, and the transmitter is in Lakewood on Green Mountain. KKFN runs local sports shows days and evenings, and carries ESPN Radio programming late nights and weekends.

== History ==
=== Middle of the road (1964–1986) ===
In September 1964, KLMO-FM first signed on, a sister station to KLMO (then at 1050 AM, now KRCN at 1060 AM). Powered at 28,000 watts with a tower only 88 feet tall, unable to be heard throughout the Denver region, the station targeted Longmont, Boulder and the suburbs north of Denver. KLMO-FM simulcast the middle of the road music and news heard on its AM counterpart.

=== Adult contemporary (1986–1987) ===
In December 1986, KLMO-FM was sold to local owner Western Cities Broadcasting. Western Cities got the Federal Communications Commission to permit 104.3 to boost its power to 58,000 watts, now covering more of the Denver market. The station switched to an adult contemporary music format, changing its call sign to KQKS, and branded as "104.3 Kiss FM". In mid-1987, the branding was shortened to "KS104".

=== Top 40 (1987–1996) ===
On August 1, 1987, amidst heavy competition against three other AC FM's in the Denver market, and with only one Top 40/CHR station in the market, KQKS segued to a Top 40/CHR format. By 1989, the station evolved into a dance-leaning rhythmic top 40 direction, but by 1993, KQKS started shifting back to a mainstream Top 40 direction again when it became the only Top 40 in the market.

However, by 1995, KQKS would see heavy competition from two stations in KWMX and KALC, both of which went after listeners by playing mainstream pop music. As a result, KQKS returned to rhythmic contemporary hits that year. But by 1996, KQKS would receive a major jolt when the station's DJs defected to another new rhythmic contemporary hit radio station, KJMN (JAM'N 92.1), and began attacking them on-air and on the streets.

In November 1996, Western Cities sold the station to Jefferson-Pilot.

=== Country (1997–2000) ===
On January 8, 1997, Jefferson-Pilot (which later became part of the Lincoln Financial Group) moved the KQKS call sign and Rhythmic Top 40 format to 107.5 MHz. With that switch, on January 18, Jefferson—Pilot placed a classic country format on 104.3 as KCKK, initially branded "Country 104.3" and later "K104.3, Denver's Country HIT Kicker." Jefferson-Pilot opened new studios in Lakewood for all of its Denver stations in mid-1997. (Lincoln Financial moved operations to Greenwood Village in 2006.)

=== Smooth jazz (2000–2008) ===
On September 1, 2000, the classic country format moved to AM 1600, with 104.3 flipping to smooth jazz after that format temporarily disappeared from Denver airwaves when previous smooth jazz outlet KHIH flipped to Top 40 earlier that day. KCKK switched call letters to KJCD (and the moniker “CD104.3”) shortly after the move. In June 2007, Lincoln Financial announced that would put its television and radio stations up for sale, including KJCD and its sister stations in Denver, although it would take another seven years before a deal was made.

=== Sports (2008–present) ===
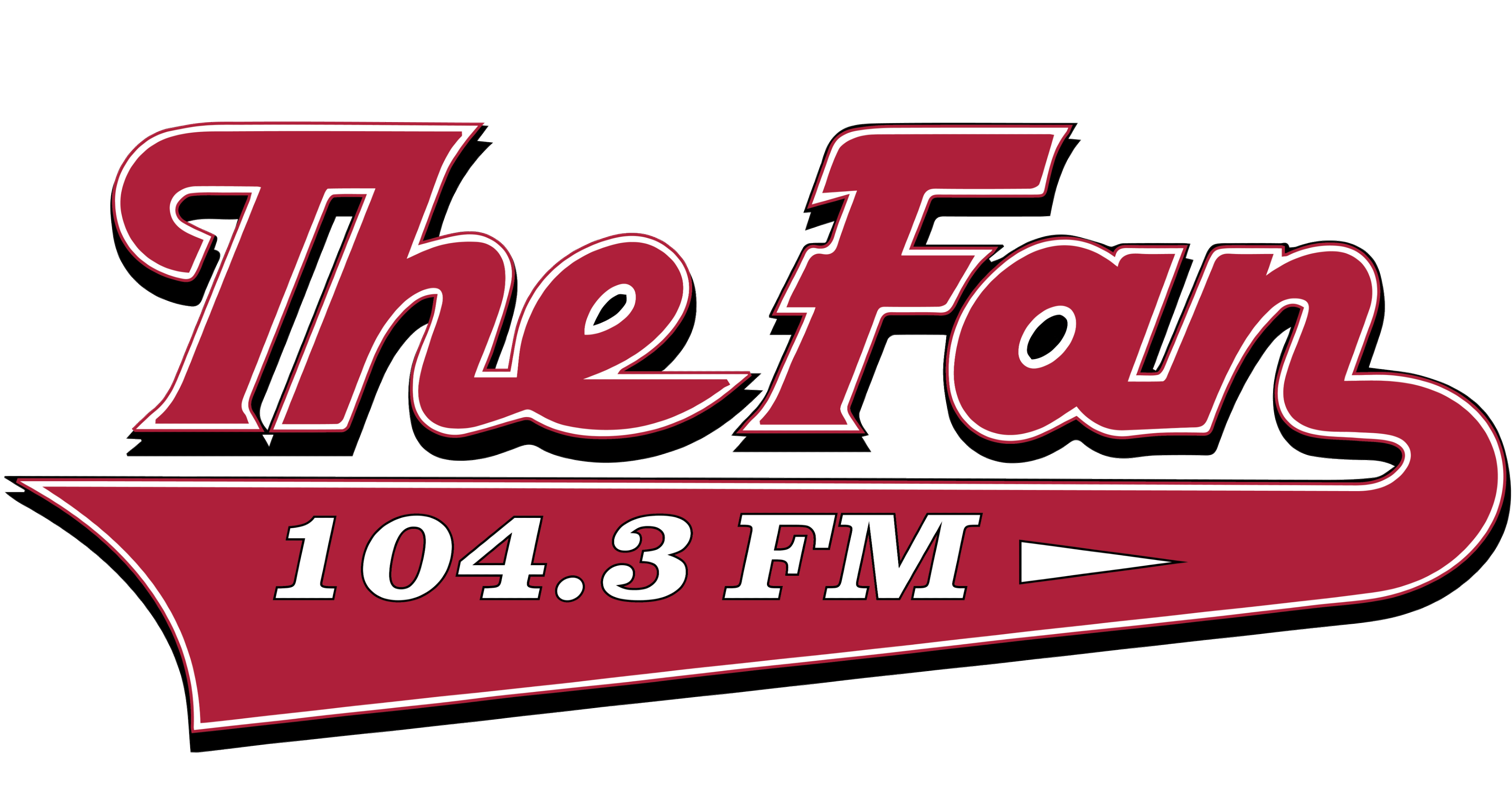
Former logo

On March 8, 2008, at 1 p.m., KJCD changed its format to all-sports, simulcasting KKFN, and rebranded as "104.3 The Fan". The call letters switched to KKFN-FM on March 12, 2008, and again to KKFN on March 1, 2009, once the sports format was moved completely over to the FM and the AM adopted an oldies format.

On December 8, 2014, Entercom made plans to purchase Lincoln Financial Group's entire 15-station lineup in a $106.5 million deal. On December 22, 2014, Entercom announced that it would spin off KKFN to the Pike's Peaks Trust, in anticipation of selling it to a third party group as part of a divestiture deal. On June 26, 2015, the FCC green-lighted the deal, with KKFN becoming part of the Pike's Peaks Trust, splitting it from the other properties that became part of the Entercom acquisition. On July 14, 2015, the Department of Justice forced Entercom to spin off KKFN, KOSI, KYGO-FM and KEPN to Bonneville International in exchange for Bonneville's KSWD in Los Angeles (and $5 million) to meet ownership limits and satisfy total market revenue limits. Both Bonneville and Entercom began operating their new clusters via a Time Brokerage Agreement on July 17, 2015. The deal was officially consummated on November 24, 2015.

On January 3, 2023, KKFN officially rebranded as "Denver Sports 104.3 The Fan", while also expanding the "Denver Sports" brand to KEPN.

On May 7, 2026, the "Fan" format would expand to the Fort Collins market, with Bonneville making an agreement with Townsquare Media to syndicate a majority of KKFN programming on KARS-FM, to the point the station itself assumed the "Fan" brand.

== Programming ==
KKFN carries NFL play-by-play including Sunday Night Football, Monday Night Football, Thursday Night Football, all NFL playoff games, and the Super Bowl. It also airs college football games including the College Football Playoff, the Daytona 500, the NBA Playoffs and NBA Finals. Weekday evenings and weekends are handled by ESPN Radio.
