= KQMT =

- Denver, Colorado; United States
- Broadcast area: Denver metropolitan area
- Frequency: 99.5 MHz (HD Radio)
- Branding: 99-5 The Mountain

Programming
- Language: English
- Format: Classic rock
- Subchannels: HD2: KAMP simulcast HD3: KTLF simulcast

Ownership
- Owner: Audacy, Inc.; (Audacy License, LLC)
- Sister stations: KALC; KAMP; KQKS

History
- First air date: October 2, 1958 (as KDEN-FM)
- Former call signs: KDEN-FM (1958–1969); KVOD (1969–1996); KKHK (1996–2002)
- Call sign meaning: "Mountain"

Technical information
- Licensing authority: FCC
- Facility ID: 26929
- Class: C
- ERP: 100,000 watts
- HAAT: 513 meters (1,683 ft)
- Transmitter coordinates: 39°43′43.96″N 105°14′9.96″W

Links
- Public license information: Public file; LMS
- Webcast: Listen live (via Audacy)
- Website: www.audacy.com/995themountain

KQMT (99.5 FM, "99-5 The Mountain") is a classic rock radio station serving the Denver, Colorado Metropolitan Area. The station is owned and operated by Audacy, Inc. with its studios located in the Denver Tech Center district. Its main transmitter is located on Lookout Mountain near Golden, with a backup transmitter location on Ruby Hill in Denver. KQMT broadcasts in HD and is available on the Audacy audio platform.

== History ==
=== Classical (1957–1996) ===
In October 1957, the station signed on as KDEN-FM, and then in 1969, changed call letters to KVOD.

KVOD was originally a commercial radio station, marketing as the voice of classical music for the Denver Metro area. In November 1995, Henry Broadcasting Company announced it would sell the station to Tribune Broadcasting.

=== Classic hits (1996–2002) ===
On February 18, 1996, as part of a format transfer, KVOD began simulcasting on 92.5 FM following the sale of the 99.5 frequency to Tribune, who launched a classic rock format called KKHK ("The Hawk") on March 4. Tribune then sold the station to Entercom Communications in January 2002.

=== Classic rock (2002–present) ===
A few months after the sale, KKHK rebranded as "The Mountain", and changed call letters to the current KQMT.

KQMT's original studios were located on South Girard Street at 10200 E. Girard in southeast Denver until 2005, when they moved into their current studios in the Denver Tech Center.

In June 2016, longtime market veteran and afternoon personality Dan Mitchell relocated to Texas, with Dan Hardee coming on board from crosstown KYGO and KOSI to host afternoons. Shortly after, Allie Hartwick joined the air staff, along with longtime market veteran "The G-Man" taking over nights.

On November 19, 2018, at 6:00 a.m., KQMT started Stunting with all-Rolling Stones songs with afternoon personality Dan Hardee to promote upcoming spring concert "Stones No Filter" at Broncos Stadium at Mile High; it ended at 12:02 a.m. the following morning.

In January 2019, after sixteen years at KQMT, Mike Casey left as Morning Host. Casey had previously served as music director and Midday host before moving to Mornings in 2008. While with KQMT, Casey was famous for hosting Barrel of Monkeys and the Resurrection Jukebox.

In September 2019, former WLHK Indianapolis morning personality Dave O'Brien joined the air staff for mornings.

In January 2020, KQMT, along with all other Entercom-owned stations, began airing morning and afternoon traffic reports, with Allie Hartwick and Erin Doyle serving as reporters.

In June 2020, KQMT began branding itself as home of the "2 Minute Promise", featuring commercial breaks that were no longer than 2 minutes in length, similar to company sister station KNDD in Seattle. The feature was soon adopted at all Entercom-owned Alternative stations nationwide. The 2 Minute Promise was eventually phased out in many markets in late 2021.

On March 30, 2021, KQMT and all other Entercom-owned stations were rebranded under the new Audacy audio platform.

In April 2022, Jolene Shearer, long-time night personality at KISW Seattle, joined the airstaff as midday host, with Remy Maxwell of KZJK Minneapolis coming on board for nights.
