= Lincoln Financial Media =

Broadcasting subsidiary of Lincoln National Corporation

- Type: Subsidiary
- Industry: Broadcasting
- Predecessor: Jefferson-Pilot Communications
- Founded: April 2006; 20 years ago
- Defunct: July 17, 2015; 10 years ago
- Fate: Assets acquired by Raycom Media and Entercom
- Successor: Audacy, Inc.; Raycom Media; Gray Media
- Parent: Lincoln National Corporation

Lincoln Financial Media was a subsidiary of Lincoln National Corporation that owned radio stations in the United States. The division was formed in 2006 following the company's acquisition of Jefferson-Pilot's television and radio operations, which were renamed Lincoln Financial Media.

The group, at the time of its closure, owned 14 radio stations in Miami, San Diego, Denver, and Atlanta. It also owned WBT, WBT-FM, and WLNK (FM) in Charlotte, North Carolina and WBTV, the CBS affiliate in Charlotte; WCSC-TV, the CBS affiliate in Charleston, South Carolina and WWBT, the NBC affiliate in Richmond, Virginia. All three of the aforementioned TV stations are now owned by a successor company Gray Media.

== History ==
The media company began in 1945 as Jefferson Standard Broadcasting Company, Inc., which became Jefferson-Pilot Communications in 1968. The company was a media-centered division of the Jefferson Standard Insurance Company of Greensboro, North Carolina, which later merged with Pilot Life Insurance Company to form Jefferson-Pilot. Jefferson-Pilot owned WBT-AM-FM and WBTV, all of which are based in Charlotte, North Carolina. In 1962, the company conceived Jefferson Productions (later Jefferson Pilot Teleproductions, later Jefferson Pilot Sports), a production arm that produced television programs and commercials, but later chose to produce syndicated sports programming only by the 1980s. It was originally intended to produce promos and local television shows for WBTV but had since grown to produce nationally syndicated talk shows and variety shows; and mainly commercials for major companies that aired nationwide. For further information, see the section "Lincoln Financial Sports" at the end of this article.

In April 2006, the Jefferson-Pilot Corporation merged with the Lincoln National Corporation; taking the media and sports broadcasting division with it, Jefferson-Pilot Communications became Lincoln Financial Media.

In June 2007, the company publicly announced it would explore a sale of this division, and hired Merrill Lynch to assess its strategic options. On November 12, 2007, Raycom Media announced that it would acquire Lincoln Financial Media's three television stations, along with the Lincoln Financial Sports division (which was folded into Raycom Sports, then into Gray Television) for $583 million. The acquisition was completed in April 2008.

On December 8, 2014, Entercom (rebranded Audacy, Inc. as of March 30, 2021) announced its intent to acquire the remainder of Lincoln Financial Media for $110 million and working capital. To comply with ownership limits, Entercom was to divest one of its existing stations in Denver. Later, Entercom announced it would swap four of its stations in Denver to Bonneville International in exchange for KSWD in Los Angeles. The merger was completed on July 17 and Bonneville and Entercom began operating their new clusters under time-brokerage agreements that same day.

== Former stations ==
- Stations are arranged in alphabetical order by state and city of license.
- Two boldface asterisks appearing following a station's call letters (**) indicate a station built and signed on by Jefferson-Pilot or Lincoln Financial.

Stations owned by Jefferson-Pilot/Lincoln Financial
| Media market | State | Station | Purchased | Sold | Notes |
|---|---|---|---|---|---|
| San Diego | California | KBZT | 1996 | 2014 | |
| San Diego | California | KIFM | 1996 | 2014 | |
| San Diego | California | KSON | 1985 | 2005 | (Note: Known as KDDZ from 1996 to 1997, and as KSON again from 1997 onward.) |
| San Diego | California | KSON-FM | 1985 | 2014 | |
| San Diego | California | KSOQ-FM | 2003 | 2014 | |
| Denver | Colorado | KEPN | 1992 | 2014 | (Note: Known as KRXY prior to 1993, KWMX from 1993 to 1994, KYGO from 1994 to 1999 and as KCKK from 1999 to 2006.) |
| Denver | Colorado | KKFN | 1996 | 2014 | (Note: Known as KCKK from 1997 to 2000 and as KJCD from 2000 to 2008.) |
| Denver | Colorado | KRWZ | 1974 | 2014 | (Note: Known as KIMN prior to 1988, KYGO from 1988 to 1994, and as KKFN from 1994 to 2008.) |
| Denver | Colorado | KQKS | 1996 | 2014 | |
| Denver | Colorado | KYGO-FM | 1974 | 2014 | (Note: Known as KIMN-FM prior to 1979.) |
| Miami | Florida | WAXY | 1985 | 2014 | (Note: Known as WNWS prior to 1990 and as WMRZ from 1990 to 1994.) |
| Miami | Florida | WAXY-FM | 2012 | 2014 | |
| Miami | Florida | WGBS | 1979 | 1985 | |
| Miami | Florida | WLYF | 1979 | 2014 | |
| Miami | Florida | WMXJ | 1994 | 2014 | |
| Atlanta | Georgia | WQXI | 1974 | 2014 | |
| Atlanta | Georgia | WSTR | 1974 | 2014 | (Note: Known as WQXI-FM prior to 1989.) |
| Charlotte | North Carolina | WBT | 1945 | 2014 | |
| Charlotte | North Carolina | WBT-FM | 1995 | 2014 | |
| Charlotte | North Carolina | WBTV ** | 1949 | 2008 | |
| Charlotte | North Carolina | WLNK ** | 1962 | 2014 | (Note: Known as WBT-FM prior to 1978, and again from 1989 to 1995, and as WBCY from 1978 to 1989.) |
| Greensboro | North Carolina | WBIG | 1930 | 1986 | (Note: First broadcast property of Jefferson-Pilot. Ceased operations in 1986.) |
| Florence | South Carolina | WBTW ** | 1954 | 1968 | |
| Richmond | Virginia | WWBT | 1968 | 2008 | |

== Lincoln Financial Sports ==
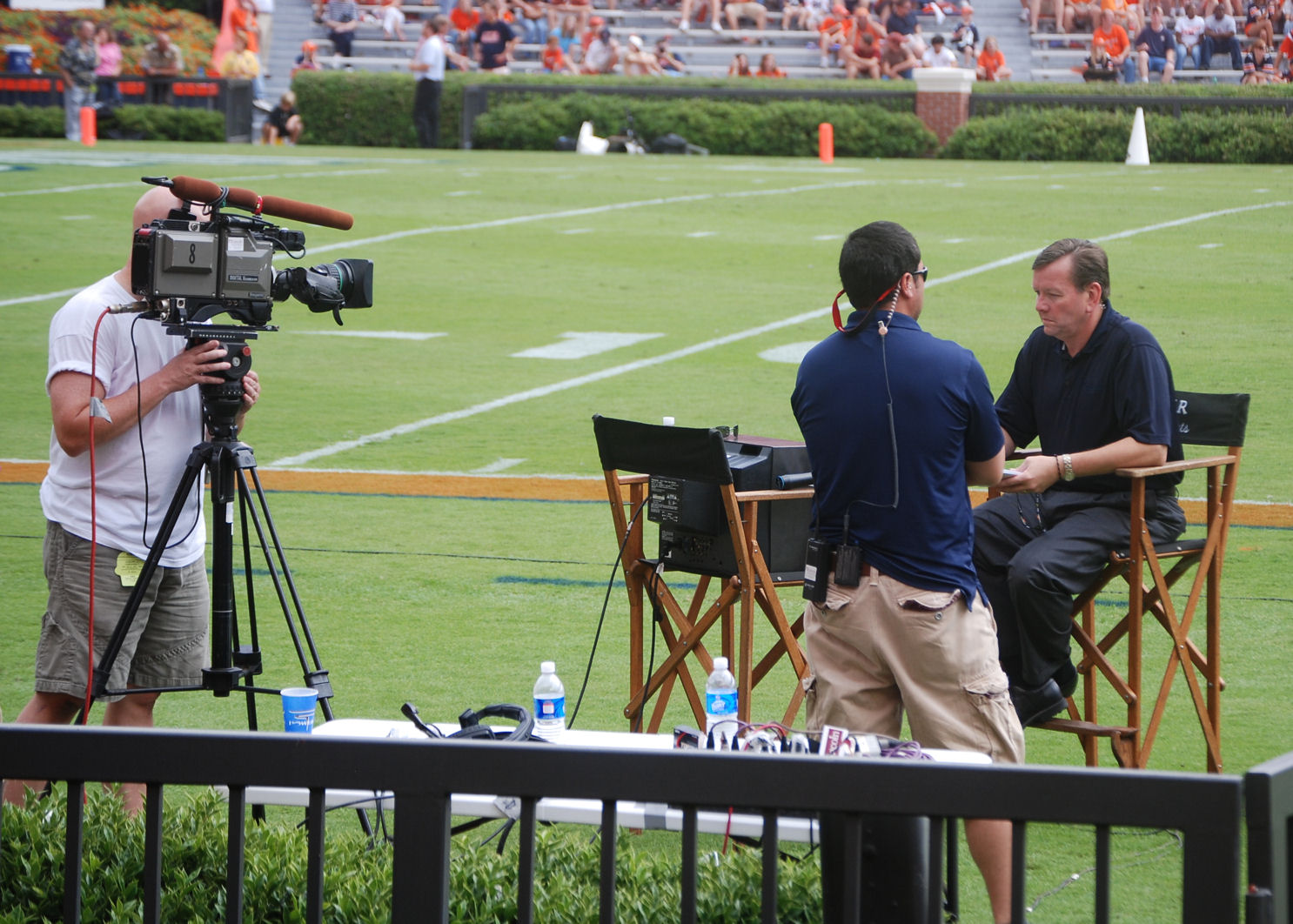
LFS SEC sideline reporter Dave Baker

Lincoln Financial Sports, originally Jefferson-Pilot Teleproductions (later Jefferson Pilot Sports), produced and syndicated college sports events of the Southeastern Conference, and co-produced Atlantic Coast Conference sporting events with Raycom Sports. It also produced telecasts of pre-season games of the Carolina Panthers of the National Football League, and in the 1980s, syndicated coverage of the NASCAR Winston Cup races at Charlotte Motor Speedway.

On November 12, 2007, Lincoln Financial Group announced the sale of this division to Raycom Media. The group would later operate under the Raycom Sports banner as of January 1, 2008.

| Preceded by Jefferson Pilot Sports | Syndication Rightsholder to Southeastern Conference football and men's basketball 2006-2007 | Succeeded by Raycom Sports |
| Preceded by Jefferson Pilot Sports | Syndication Rightsholder to Atlantic Coast Conference football 2006-2007 | Succeeded by Raycom Sports |
| Preceded by Raycom/Jefferson Pilot Sports | Syndication Rights Holder to the Atlantic Coast Conference men's basketball 2006-2007 (co-produced with Raycom Sports) | Succeeded by Raycom Sports |
