= KQKS =

- Lakewood, Colorado; United States
- Broadcast area: Denver metropolitan area
- Frequency: 107.5 MHz (HD Radio)
- Branding: KS1075

Programming
- Language: English
- Format: Rhythmic hot AC
- Subchannels: HD2: Country "Front Range Country 103.1"

Ownership
- Owner: Audacy, Inc.; (Audacy License, LLC)
- Sister stations: KALC; KAMP; KQMT

History
- First air date: July 9, 1966 (as KLAK-FM at 107.7)
- Former call signs: KLAK-FM (1966–1970); KJAE (1970–1973); KLAK-FM (1973–1978); KPPL (1978–1984); KRXY-FM (1984–1993); KWMX-FM (1993–1996); KHHT (1996–1997)
- Former frequencies: 107.7 MHz (1966–1970)
- Call sign meaning: "Kiss" (former Kiss FM branding)

Technical information
- Licensing authority: FCC
- Facility ID: 35574
- Class: C
- ERP: 100,000 watts
- HAAT: 365 meters (1,198 ft)
- Transmitter coordinates: 39.696°N 105.166°W
- Translator: HD2: 103.1 K276FK (Denver)

Links
- Public license information: Public file; LMS
- Webcast: Listen live (via Audacy); Listen live (via Audacy) (HD2)
- Website: www.audacy.com/ks1075; www.audacy.com/frontrange1031 (HD2)

KQKS (107.5 FM, KS107.5) is a rhythmic hot AC radio station, licensed to Lakewood, Colorado. It is owned by Audacy, Inc. and serves the Denver-Boulder metropolitan area.

Its studios and offices are located in the Denver Tech Center district, and the transmitter is on Green Mountain in Lakewood. KQKS broadcasts in the HD Radio format.

== KQKS history ==
=== KLMO-FM ===
What is now KQKS originally signed on at 104.3 FM in September 1964 as KLMO-FM, the FM counterpart of KLMO (now KRCN).

In December 1986, Western Cities Broadcasting purchased KLMO-FM. The company would move the transmitter site closer to Denver, increase power from 28,000 watts to 58,000 watts, and raise antenna height from 88 feet to 980 feet. The call sign would be switched to KQKS, and the format flipped to Adult Contemporary. At the time, the station was known as "104.3 Kiss FM."

=== Top 40 KS104 ===
In mid-1987, the branding was shortened to "KS104". On August 1, 1987, amidst heavy competition against three other FM adult contemporary stations in Denver, and with only one Top 40 station in the market, KQKS segued to a Mainstream Top 40 format, again as "KS104." By 1989, KQKS evolved into a Dance-leaning Rhythmic Top 40 outlet. By 1993, the station shifted back to mainstream contemporary hits when it was left as the market's sole surviving Top 40 radio station. The air staff at the time included Mark Speers and Laurie Michaels in mornings, PJ Cruise in middays, Michael Hayes in afternoons, Sweet G in evenings, Ed Atkins in late evenings, JJ Cruze on overnights, and Brandon Scott on swing.

By 1995, KS104 was competing heavily against KWMX and KALC, particularly for the young female audience. As a direct result, KQKS returned to a rhythmic contemporary direction that year. But by 1996, KQKS was struck by a major blow when the entire on-air staff defected across the street to newly minted Rhythmic Contemporary rival KJMN, and began attacking "KS104" on-air and on the streets. The station ran automated without live air staff for the remainder of its time at 104.3.

=== Move to 107.5 FM ===
In November 1996, Western Cities sold "KS104" to Jefferson-Pilot Communications (now known as Lincoln National Corporation) for $15 million. Jefferson-Pilot continued to run the station jockless for two more months. On January 8, 1997, Jefferson-Pilot moved KQKS to 107.5 FM and relaunched it as "KS1075", replacing KHHT's low-rated mainstream Top 40 format. KQKS's former home at 104.3 FM switched to Classic Country on January 18. (104.3 is now sports radio KKFN.)

The move boosted KQKS's ratings, resulting in KJMN throwing in the towel on March 30, 1997. Since then, KQKS has faced several competitors. In 2009, Clear Channel Communications flipped KPTT (which had once competed against KQKS as Top 40/CHR KFMD from 2000 to 2005) to Rhythmic Top 40, resulting in KQKS adding more rap to its playlist. While Rap and Hip-hop accounts for over 50% of KS1075's playlist, the station, like most of the other Rhythmic outlets in the United States, has added some Rhythmic Pop/Dance tracks due to changing tastes among its listeners.

=== Ownership changes ===
In late 2005, Lincoln Financial Group acquired Jefferson-Pilot, which in turn resulted in Lincoln Financial becoming KQKS' parent company. The firm decided to keep Jefferson-Pilot's broadcasting properties in its portfolio despite offers by other broadcasting groups to buy the stations. On April 3, 2006, KQKS and the other stations began replacing the ownership on-air liners "A Jefferson-Pilot Station" with "A Lincoln Financial Station." In June 2007, Lincoln Financial announced that would put its television and radio stations up for sale. KQKS and its sister stations in Denver were among the properties being shopped around by Lincoln Financial, until the company suspended those plans in 2008.

On December 8, 2014, Entercom announced it would purchase Lincoln Financial Group's entire 15-station lineup in a $106.5 million deal, and would operate the outlets under a local marketing agreement (LMA). The company would retain KQKS along with KRWZ, KQMT, KALC, KEZW, and translator K276FK while divesting itself of KKFN, KYGO-FM, KOSI, and KEPN to satisfy ownership limits. The FCC approved the deal on June 26, 2015.

== 107.5 History ==
=== Country KLAK-FM ===
On July 9, 1966, KLAK-FM signed on, originally broadcasting at 107.7 FM. It was owned by Lakewood Broadcasting Service and it simulcast the Country format of its sister station on 1600 AM. In 1970, it relocated to 107.5 FM and became KJAE, switching its format to Top 40. However, this first attempt at contemporary hits would be short lived; the station returned to Country in 1973, and restored the KLAK-FM call sign. In 1978, it changed call letters to KPPL ("K-People"), airing a Beautiful Music/MOR format, followed by a brief stint with a Modern Rock format in 1983, only to shift to adult contemporary.

=== Top 40 KPPL/CHR Y108 ===
In February 1983, KPPL and AM sister station KLAK were acquired by Malrite Communications, and would become a sister station to Top 40/CHR powerhouse WHTZ (Z100) in New York, which went on the air the same year. In July 1984, 107.5 switched to Top 40/CHR, took the call sign KRXY-FM, and adopted the moniker "Y108 FM". It was the top-rated CHR station in Denver during the mid and late 1980s, competing against KOAQ (Q103) until that station transitioned to an adult contemporary format in 1986, and against KPKE until that station flipped in 1987. KRXY also simulcast at night on 1600 AM as "KRXY-AM" during this time. Program directors were Robin Mitchell, Scott Fischer (interim), John Driscoll, Mark Bolke, and Dom Testa, who took over programming duties in 1991. The music directors were Geina Horton, Todd Cavanah, and Dom Testa. The Y108 morning show was hosted by, in sequence, Chuck Buell and the Denver Morning Zoo (also featuring Geina Horton, Jon Dwayne and Con Schafer), and later in 1986 by Dave Otto (featuring Lee Ann Nye as Iva B. Presley). Afternoon personalities included Beau Matthews, Scott "Scruff" Thrower, and Dom Testa. Evenings featured Bwana Johnny and Michael "Moondoggie" Moon. Don MacLeod was heard on late nights and weekends.

In October 1987, Malrite Communications sold KRXY to Capital Cities/ABC Radio for a reported $10.7 million.

In October 1988 (variously reported as 1987), an 18 year-old armed with a rifle, six cassette tapes of The Smiths and one Morrissey album, drove to the station with the intent of forcing them to play music by the English alternative rock bands. The station's production manager, Greg Fadick, encountered the troubled young man in the parking lot, and later recalled having the barrel of a Remington pointed in his face for a minute or two. The would-be assailant then suddenly turned the rifle around and handed it to him butt-first, and asked him to call the police. "Tell them I need help," he said. "I was gonna hijack it, but I lost my nerve," he told one of the officers. "I was going to make 'em play some tapes, but I couldn't go through with it." Telling police, he picked Y108 "because they're number one." The 2021 film Shoplifters of the World is loosely based on this incident, although in the movie a radio station is actually held at gunpoint and forced to play songs by The Smiths.

=== KWMX/KHHT ===
KRXY was overtaken in the ratings by KQKS (then at 104.3 FM) in 1991; by this time, KRXY began to lean toward Adult Top 40, and eventually dropped the "Y108" moniker, becoming "Mix 107.5" with a Hot AC format in June 1991. After Jefferson-Pilot bought the station from ABC in January 1993, its call letters were changed to KWMX-FM on January 20 (concurrently, KRXY (AM) became KWMX; in 1994, the AM station would drop the simulcast with the FM and flip to classic country as KYGO). During the mid-1990s, KWMX would compete against KOSI and KALC. In response, KWMX adjusted its playlist to a Modern Pop/Rock direction that KALC was also embracing at the time by late 1995. In early 1996, the station rebranded slightly to "107.5 The Mix"; however, the move proved unsuccessful for KWMX. In July 1996, KWMX's morning show was let go.

At midnight on August 2, the station began stunting with audio from movies as "America's Radio Movie Channel." At 5 p.m. that day, KWMX officially flipped back to Top 40, and changed its moniker to "K-Hits 107.5." On August 30, 1996, the call letters switched to KHHT to match the "K-Hits 107.5" moniker. However, the new format failed to catch on. On January 8, 1997, after Jefferson-Pilot bought KQKS, the "K-Hits" format was discontinued with KQKS moving its call letters and rhythmic format to 107.5. The call letter change to KQKS officially took place February 21, 1997.

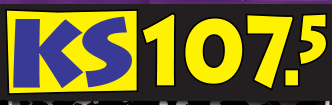
Previous logo

== Airstaff ==
Larry Ulibarri, Kendall B, and Kathie J held down the morning time slot, the longest in the station's history, from 2001 until March 2017 when a contract dispute resulted in their departure from KQKS. Kendall B had already left the station in January 2017 to pursue other opportunities.

== Music history ==
KQKS played a pivotal role in breaking the record "That's What Love Can Do" by the American female group Boy Krazy. The song, produced by Stock Aitken Waterman, was a commercial failure upon its original release in Europe in 1991, but by late 1992, it began receiving airplay on KQKS after one of the staffers heard a remix done by Hot Tracks, breathing new life into it. The record climbed up the charts, becoming a Top 20 hit on the Billboard Hot 100, Top 40 Mainstream and Rhythmic Contemporary charts in 1993. Boy Krazy mentions KQKS in their credits on the single which can be found on their first (and only) 1993 self-titled album.

== HD Radio ==
KQKS's HD2 subchannel airs a country music format, feeding translator station 103.1 K276FK in Denver, known as "Front Range Country 103.1".

On March 12, 2021, KQKS launched a sports format on its HD3 subchannel, branded as "Mile High Sports" (the format was previously heard on KDCO). KQKS-HD3 is simulcast on FM translator K251CV (98.1 FM).

On March 3, 2023, KQKS-HD2/K276FK dropped the comedy format (the station becoming notable at that time for being one of the only remaining radio stations in the United States to carry such a format; the format moved to KQMT-HD2) and flipped to a 1990s-focused classic country format, branded as "Front Range Country 103.1".

On December 20, 2024, KQKS-HD3's "Mile High Sports" ceased operations and K251CV switched to "K-Love 2000s", simulcasting KLDV-HD3.
