= Insurance patent =

Under some patent laws, patents may be obtained for insurance-related inventions. Historically, patents could only cover the technological aspects of a new insurance invention. This is still the case in most countries. In the United States, however, recent court decisions have encouraged more inventors to file patent applications on methods of doing business. These patents may be used to get more comprehensive coverage of improvements in basic insurance processes, such as the methods of calculating insurance premiums, reserves, underwriting, etc. This is causing controversy in the insurance industry as some see it as a positive development and others see it as a negative development.

== History ==
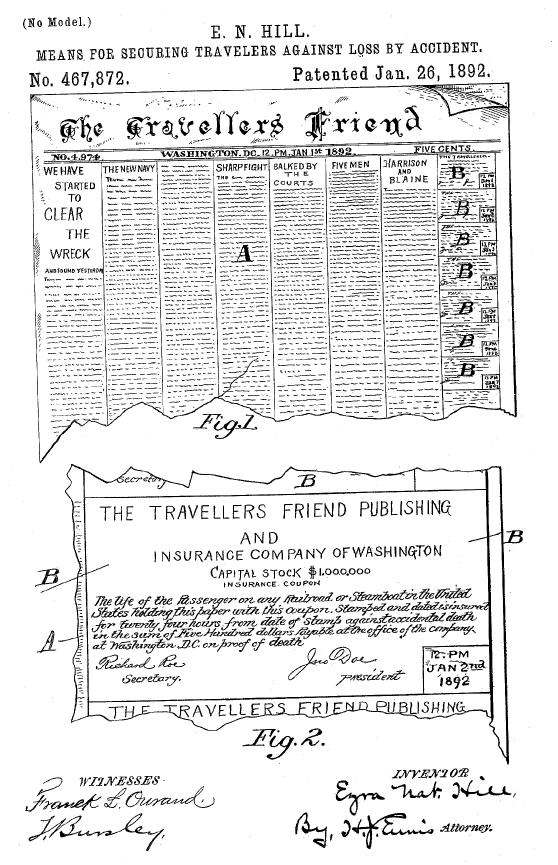
Early example of an insurance patent

An early example of an insurance patent is U.S. patent 467,872 Means for Securing Travelers Against Loss by Accident. This patent was issued in 1892. It discloses a means for selling travelers' insurance by combining coupons with a newspaper.

A more recent example of an insurance patent is EP application 0700009, granted as EP 0700009B "Individual evaluation system for motorcar risk". This patent issued by the European Patent Office in 1996 to Salvador Minguijon Perez. It discloses a means for auto insurance risk selection whereby a driver's mileage and driving behavior are monitored and insurance premiums are charged accordingly. The United Kingdom part of this European patent has been sold to Norwich Union insurance company.

== Growth ==
Historically, only about one or two patents per year issued in the US on inventions specifically related to insurance policies.

This changed dramatically, however, with the 1998 State Street Bank Decision. The State Street Bank Decision was a ruling by the Court of Appeals for the Federal Circuit that confirmed that there was no "business method exception" under United States patent law. The number of patent applications filed per year after this decision was handed down jumped to about 150. The number of patents issuing per year jumped to about 30.

This changed dramatically again in 2014 after the Alice Corp. v. CLS Bank International decision by the Supreme Court of the United States, holding that an abstract idea does not become patentable just because it is implemented on a computer. After Alice, the allowance rate for U.S. patent applications in the financial arts, including insurance, plummeted.

== Litigation ==
In September 2006, Lincoln National Corporation filed a patent infringement lawsuit against Transamerica Life Insurance Company and other entities for allegedly infringing U.S. patent 7,089,201, "Method and apparatus for providing retirement income benefits". This patent covers methods for administering variable annuities. The jury found the patent valid and infringed. The court ordered Transamerica to pay Lincoln $13 million in damages. At a rate of 11 basis points of assets under management, this was considered a reasonable royalty. In June 2010, however, the verdict against Transamerica was overturned on appeal

In June 2010, Progressive Auto Insurance filed a patent infringement lawsuit against Liberty Mutual over one of Progressive's Pay As You Drive auto insurance patents.

== Controversy ==
Some in the insurance industry see the growth in insurance patents as a positive development. They cite that by being able to protect inventions, insurance companies will be more inclined to invest in new product development.

Some are concerned that the growth in patent claims will be negative. They are concerned that invalid patents will issue and that this will lead to patent trolls inhibiting new product introductions by demanding excessive license fees for these questionable patents.

== Public review ==
First Insurance Patent Application posted for public review

Inventors can now have their insurance U.S. patent applications reviewed by the public in the Peer to Patent program. The first insurance patent application to be posted was US2009005522 "Risk assessment company". It was posted on March 6, 2009. This patent application describes a method for increasing the ease of changing insurance companies to get better rates.

== Notable patents ==
- EP 0700009, Minguijon Perez, Salvador, "Individual evaluation system for motorcar risk", published 1996-03-06. First patent on telematic automobile insurance. Commercialized as PAYD auto insurance in the UK.
- US 6235176, Schoen, Matthew Bernard & Khodara, Jean-Philippe, "Computer apparatus and method for defined contribution and profit sharing pension and disability plan", published 2001-05-22, assigned to MB Schoen & Associates. Patented disability insurance for a defined contribution pension plans. Adopted by IBM for their employees.

== See also ==
- Business method patent
