= KPLS =

KPLS may refer to:

- KPLS (AM), a radio station (1510 AM) licensed to serve Littleton, Colorado, United States
- KPLS-FM, a radio station (97.7 FM) licensed to serve Strasburg, Colorado, United States
- KLAA (AM), a radio station (830 AM) licensed to serve Orange, California, United States, which held the call sign KPLS from 1991 to 2003
