= KYOL =

KYOL may refer to:

- KYOL (FM), a radio station (91.7 FM) licensed to serve Chama, New Mexico, United States
- KPLS (AM), a radio station (1510 AM) licensed to serve Littleton, Colorado, United States, which held the call sign KYOL in 2006
