= Topgrading =

Corporate hiring and interviewing methodology

Topgrading is a corporate hiring and interviewing methodology that is intended to identify preferred candidates for a particular position. In the methodology, prospective employees undergo a 12-step process that includes extensive interviews, the creation of detailed job scorecards, research into job history, coaching, and more. After being interviewed and reference-checked, job candidates are grouped into one of three categories: A Players, B Players, or C Players. A Players have the most potential for high performance in their role while B and C Players may require more work to be successful. The methodology has been used by major corporations and organizations like General Electric, Lincoln Financial, Honeywell, Barclays, and the American Heart Association.

== Origin ==
The term was coined by Bradford D. Smart and his son, Geoffrey, in a 1997 article in Directors and Boards magazine. The elder Smart had used practices similar to topgrading when he helped set up General Electric's hiring practices in the 1980s and 1990s. His consulting firm practiced and taught topgrading methods. In 1999, Smart also released a book called Topgrading: How Leading Companies Win by Hiring, Coaching and Keeping the Best People that detailed the topgrading process. The most recent edition of the book was released in 2012 and became a New York Times and Wall Street Journal bestseller.

== Methodology ==
Topgrading is an evaluative method for identifying the most highly qualified candidate for a particular job position. It can be used in both new hires and in the promotion of current employees. The idea behind the method is to identify high-performing "A Players" even if the hiring manager has not seen these individuals in action.

Topgrading methodology assumes that the standard interview process can be and is often plagued by dishonesty from job candidates. Resumes are often faked and interviews can be manipulated to make unqualified candidates seem appropriate for the position. To mitigate the potential for dishonesty, one of the first steps in topgrading is to tell candidates that, at the end of the interview process, they must organize their own reference checks from former managers, colleagues, and others. This is known as a Threat of Reference Check (TORC) and is implemented to weed out candidates who may be dishonest or who may lack motivation. The hiring manager can use these reference checks to verify the veracity of any claims made by the candidates. If a candidate fails to arrange these references, the assumption is that they are a "low-performing" B or C Player.

As outlined in Bradford Smart's Topgrading, there are generally 12 steps that companies must take in order to effectively implement topgrading. Some of the most important steps include measuring hiring success before topgrading, using the Threat of Reference Check (TORC) to encourage honesty, creating a detailed job scorecard in lieu of a vague job description, recruiting from established networks, screening with topgrading software, scrutinizing career history via the Topgrading Snapshot (a visual portrayal of the candidate career history including full salary history and estimated performance ratings by all managers), conducting multiple interviews including the tandem chronological Topgrading Interview, asking candidates to organize reference meetings with prior managers and others, coaching new hires, and evaluating the effectiveness of topgrading after making new hires.

=== Interview process ===
The interview process is an important aspect of the topgrading methodology. The first interview is called "The Telephone Screening Interview" and it simply requires an exchange of basic information and ideas to ensure that the candidate is at least fit for and legitimately interested in the position. The next interview step is a series of "Competency Interviews". These interviews ask candidates to provide examples of certain competencies they possess. The hiring manager typically chooses between six and eight competency categories (including Leadership, Organization, "Company Fit", Peer Relations, and Resourcefulness) that are essential to the company. Different interviewers then ask questions that revolve around two of the categories (often "Company Fit" and one other).

The next interview is referred to as the Topgrading Interview. The hiring manager and another manager act as "tandem interviewers" and conduct an up to four-hour interview for managers (interviews for subordinate positions are much shorter). The interview thoroughly covers every aspect of the candidate's career history. Interviewers ask up to 10 standard questions (plus follow-up questions) about each job during the process. The main questions ask candidates about successes, mistakes, key decisions, key relationship, their manager's strengths and weaker points, how their manager would rate them, and why they left the job. The theory behind this interview method is that the TORC technique will cause many low-performers with exaggerated resumes to drop out, leaving a pool of theoretically honest and successful candidates. Candidates who are more willing to discuss the entirety of their career provide broader insights to interviewers. Patterns of encountering and solving problems can also reveal a wider variety of competencies. After the interview process, candidates are generally asked to arrange reference calls with their previous bosses.

Reference call interviews are the final aspect of the topgrading interview process. Candidates are asked to arrange reference calls with their previous bosses, peers, subordinates, customers, and others to verify the veracity of the candidate's statements during the interview process.

According to the methodology, those who are "chronic" B or C Players should not be hired. Individuals who effectively pass through the 12-step topgrading process are often considered A Players and should be given consideration. Theoretically, companies that employ the topgrading process could have an employee base composed of 90% A Players, although this is often dependent on hiring managers, individual grading systems, and other factors. According to research by Smart, "mis-hires" of executives can ultimately be costly for companies.

=== Effectiveness ===
A doctoral thesis at Georgia State University examined six different companies who employed topgrading. Between the six companies, a total of around 1,000 new hires were made during the study. Results of the study showed that the average pre-topgrading "mis-hire" rate was 69.3%. After the implementation of topgrading, however, the average mis-hire rate dropped to 10.5%.

=== Criticism ===
One of the main tenets of the practice is to contact every manager a candidate has ever had in any position in any company. This is sometimes done without notice to the applicant, which in some cases is a violation of national law. The heads of companies and HR acting in the belief that job candidates are inherently untrustworthy or otherwise dishonest is criticized as a toxic ideology, and even receives critique by the authors and creators of the strategy. The practice has also been criticized as anti-applicant and deeply cynical, in that it presupposes all employees arrive and leave a company at a base level of skill which is immovable and unchangeable.
