= KAMP (AM) =

- Aurora, Colorado; United States
- Broadcast area: Denver metropolitan area
- Frequency: 1430 kHz
- Branding: 1430 AM The Bet

Programming
- Language: English
- Format: Sports gambling
- Affiliations: BetMGM Network; Westwood One Sports Network

Ownership
- Owner: Audacy, Inc.; (Audacy License, LLC)
- Sister stations: KALC; KQKS; KQMT

History
- First air date: December 1, 1954 (as KOSI)
- Former call signs: KOSI (1954–1981); KEZW (1981–2021)
- Call sign meaning: Warehoused from 97.1 FM in Los Angeles

Technical information
- Licensing authority: FCC
- Facility ID: 67843
- Class: B
- Power: 10,000 watts day; 5,000 watts night
- Transmitter coordinates: 39°33′47″N 104°55′47.9″W
- Repeater: 99.5 KQMT-HD2 (Denver)

Links
- Public license information: Public file; LMS
- Webcast: Listen live (via Audacy)
- Website: www.audacy.com/thebet1430

KAMP (1430 kHz) – branded as 1430 AM The Bet – is a commercial sports AM radio station licensed to Aurora, Colorado, and serving the Denver metropolitan area. Owned by Audacy, Inc., the station's format focuses on sports betting, and is the market affiliate for Westwood One Sports Network and the BetMGM Network. The KAMP studios located in the Denver Tech Center, while the transmitter is located in nearby Highlands Ranch, near Colorado State Highway 470.

== History ==
In 1954, the station signed on as KOSI. The station was purchased by Bill Armstrong in 1959. In 1968, sister station KOSI-FM was launched on 101.1 FM. The two stations were successful in the Denver radio market, carrying a beautiful music format.

In 1981, KOSI became KEZW, and adopted an adult standards format, which would last for the next three decades. On December 27, 2015, KEZW adopted the oldies format from sister station KRWZ, which was sold to Kroenke Sports and Entertainment and flipped to sports as KKSE.

On September 4, 2018, KEZW changed its format to a hybrid of soft oldies and adult standards, branded as "EZ 1430".

On January 25, 2021, KEZW flipped to a gambling-focused sports talk format as "1430 AM The Bet". The change coincided with the launch of Entercom's BetQL Audio Network (now BetMGM Network); the station's lineup included the network's two inaugural programs, BetQL Daily and You Better You Bet, along with programming from CBS Sports Radio (now Infinity Sports Network).

On April 22, 2021, KEZW changed call letters to KAMP, as part of a warehousing move due to a change of call letters at sister station KAMP-FM in Los Angeles.
