= KNRV =

Radio station in Englewood–Denver, Colorado

- Englewood, Colorado; United States
- Broadcast area: Denver, Colorado
- Frequency: 1150 kHz
- Branding: Onda 1150AM/96.1FM

Programming
- Format: Spanish News/Talk

Ownership
- Owner: Amigo Multimedia, Inc.

History
- First air date: January 1951
- Call sign meaning: New Radio Venture (former owners)

Technical information
- Licensing authority: FCC
- Facility ID: 56643
- Class: B
- Power: 10,000 watts day; 1,000 watts night
- Transmitter coordinates: 39°36′18″N 104°50′25″W
- Translators: K241CP (96.1 MHz, Englewood)

Links
- Public license information: Public file; LMS
- Website: www.onda1150am.com

KNRV (1150 kHz) is a commercial AM radio station broadcasting a Spanish-language talk radio format. Licensed to Englewood, Colorado, KNRV serves the Denver metropolitan area, but with a quality radio, it has quality reception from Colorado Springs to Fort Collins. The station is currently owned by Amigo Multimedia Inc. Programming is also heard on an FM translator station, 96.1 K241CP, in Englewood.

Most of KNRV's daytime programming is made up of paid brokered programming in which the host pays for the time on the air and is supported by his own advertisers. At night, programming is largely from the Radio Fórmula talk network based in Mexico City.

KNRV is the Spanish-language flagship station for Colorado Rockies baseball and Denver Broncos football.

== History ==
The station began as 1220 kHz KGMC in January 1951. It was a daytimer powered at 1,000 watts and required to be off the air at night. KGMC was owned by Grady Franklin Maples. The next year, the station moved to 1150 kHz. Maples sold KGMC to MacLee Radio in 1958. MacLee later sold the station to Western Broadcasting Corporation, owned by Corky Cartwright and Marvin Davis, in 1975. Western changed the call sign to KWBZ. During this time, Alan Berg hosted a talk show on the station. Berg was fired when the station flipped to country music, though he came back when the station returned to a talk format. In 1984, Berg was shot to death outside his home in Denver.

In 1982, the station became KRZN after another sale. The station would change calls multiple times, becoming KFRR in 1989 and KCUV. In 1992, Radio Unica Communications bought the station in 1999 from Den-Mex LLC for $2.8 million. More changes followed, with 1150 AM becoming KNRC in March 2003 (KCUV, in turn, would move to KCKK (1510 AM)). The station went dark on July 27, 2004, due to the failure of KNRC's talk format. The station returned to the air in 2005 as KNRV, upon its acquisition by New Radio Venture.

New Radio Venture, including its Spanish talk radio stations in Denver and Phoenix, was sold out of bankruptcy to Amigo Multimedia in 2011. Amigo is headquartered in Denver.
