= Latter-day Saints Channel =

Radio station of the Church of Jesus Christ of Latter-day Saints

- Type: Radio network
- Country: United States
- First air date: May 18, 2009
- Availability: Various FM radio stations
- Radio stations: (HD Radio via KSL-FM-HD2 and HD3)
- Headquarters: Salt Lake City, Utah
- Broadcast area: Salt Lake City and worldwide
- Owner: Deseret Management Corporation
- Former names: Mormon Channel (2009—2019)
- Webcast: Streaming portal
- Official website: Official website

The Latter-day Saints Channel (formerly the Mormon Channel) is an over the air and Internet radio station owned and operated by the Church of Jesus Christ of Latter-day Saints (LDS Church). It is based in Salt Lake City, Utah.

Broadcasting 24/7 from facilities at the LDS Church's headquarters, Latter-day Saints Channel broadcasts over the Internet via the station website and over the HD2 and HD3 channels of seven FM stations: KIRO-FM in Seattle, KSL-FM in Salt Lake City, KTAR-FM in Phoenix, WARH in St. Louis, WSHE-FM in Chicago, KOSI-FM in Denver, and WYGY in Cincinnati. KIRO, KSL, KOSI and KTAR are owned by Bonneville International, itself owned by the LDS Church; WARH, WSHE-FM, and WYGY are owned by Hubbard Broadcasting, but were owned by Bonneville as well until 2011. KSWD in Los Angeles formerly aired the network on HD4 until the station's sale to Entercom.

== History ==
On September 17, 2019, as part of an organization-wide effort to focus on the church's full name, the channel was changed to "The Latter-day Saints Channel."
