= KTAR-FM =

News/talk radio station in Glendale, Arizona

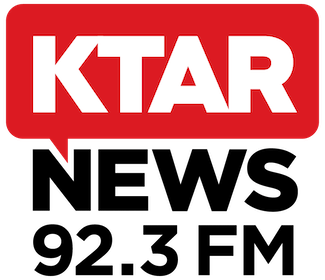
- Glendale, Arizona; United States
- Broadcast area: Phoenix metropolitan area
- Frequency: 92.3 MHz (HD Radio)
- Branding: KTAR News 92.3 FM

Programming
- Format: Talk radio
- Subchannels: HD2: Latter-day Saints Channel
- Network: ABC News Radio
- Affiliations: Westwood One; Compass Media Networks; Radio America

Ownership
- Owner: Bonneville International; (Bonneville International Corporation)
- Sister stations: KMVP-FM; KTAR (AM)

History
- First air date: December 19, 1970
- Former call signs: KXTC (1970–1981); KJJJ-FM (1981–1982); KEZC (1982–1984); KJJJ-FM (1984–1985); KKFR (1985–2006)
- Call sign meaning: Taken from KTAR, which had been owned by The Arizona Republic

Technical information
- Licensing authority: FCC
- Facility ID: 65479
- Class: C
- ERP: 100,000 watts
- HAAT: 545 meters (1,788 ft)
- Transmitter coordinates: 33°19′58″N 112°3′48″W

Links
- Public license information: Public file; LMS
- Webcast: Listen live; Listen live (via Audacy)
- Website: www.ktar.com

KTAR-FM (92.3 MHz) is a commercial radio station licensed to Glendale, Arizona, and serving the Phoenix metropolitan area. It is owned by Salt Lake City–based Bonneville International, a profit-making division of the Church of Jesus Christ of Latter-day Saints. KTAR-FM broadcasts a news/talk radio format.

The studios and offices are on North 16th Street near Piestewa Peak. The transmitter is in South Mountain Park. In addition to a standard analog transmission, KTAR-FM broadcasts in HD Radio, with its HD2 digital subchannel carrying the Latter-day Saints Channel. As Bonneville holds the radio broadcast rights to most major professional and college sports in Phoenix, KTAR-FM carries games in the event of scheduling conflicts on its co-owned sports stations, KMVP-FM 98.7 and KTAR (620 AM).

== History ==
=== KXTC ===
On December 19, 1970, the station first signed on. The original call sign was KXTC, owned by the Arizona Communications Corporation. It aired a mix of mainstream and contemporary jazz music, and was an affiliate of the ABC-FM Radio Network. It initially broadcast from a transmitter atop the Westward Ho.

In 1978, with disco music gaining in popularity, KXTC switched to an all-disco format, using the name "Disco 92". Disc jockeys included Scott Tuchman and Rick Nuhn. After a couple of years, however, the disco craze faded.

=== KJJJ-FM and KEZC ===
The station dropped disco for country music in 1980, going by the moniker "KC-92". In January 1981, the station's studios moved to Shaw Butte, and three months later, the station switched its call sign to KJJJ-FM for the first time.

In 1982, the call letters switched to KEZC, which stood for EZ Country. Easy Country played the softer hits from current and recent country music charts, designed for office listening and relaxing. In 1984, the station began to simulcast with KJJJ (910 AM). It returned to the call sign KJJJ-FM, moving back to mainstream country music.

=== KKFR ===
On September 6, 1985, KJJJ-FM flipped to KKFR as a gold-based Top 40 outlet as "The Fire Station, Arizona's 92 Fire FM", and later as "92.3 KKFR, Your Fire Station". In 1988, KKFR began calling itself "Hot Hits 92.3", but was forced to drop that by radio consultant Mike Joseph, the owner of the "Hot Hits" slogan nationally.

Over the next few years, the station began shifting towards a rhythmic contemporary format. It also adopted the name "Power 92", influenced by KPWR in Los Angeles. During this time, KKFR heavily competed KZZP and KOY-FM for contemporary music listeners. In April 1991, however, KZZP flipped to hot AC, and in September 1993, KOY-FM dropped out of the format, flipping to a short-lived "rhythm and rock" format, and then smooth jazz, leaving KKFR as the lone Top 40-oriented station in the market.

On December 16, 1993, despite high ratings as a rhythmic contemporary outlet, KKFR evolved to mainstream Top 40, leaning slightly toward modern rock. However, the station's ratings slipped. From January to March 1995, the station re-added rhythmic and dance music to the playlist, which helped the station regain much of its lost audience. By 1997, KKFR began dropping the dance hits, transforming into an R&B/hip-hop approach. By the end of the year, the station was no longer Top 40.

In late 1998, Chancellor Media (which later became AMFM, Inc.) purchased the station from its longtime owners The Broadcast Group. When Chancellor merged with Clear Channel Communications, the company had to divest the station to meet Federal Communications Commission ownership regulations. Emmis Communications bought the station in 2000. By this time, the station began calling itself "Power 92.3".

After leaving the 92.3 frequency in 2006, KKFR went through several changes. Its intellectual property was acquired by Riviera Broadcast Group (which already owned KEDJ and two stations in Las Vegas). On September 1, 2006, KKFR moved to 98.3 FM, licensed to Mayer. Sunburst Media let Riviera operate and later own the station. KKFR continues as a rimshot station in the Phoenix market, airing a rhythmic contemporary format.

=== KTAR-FM ===
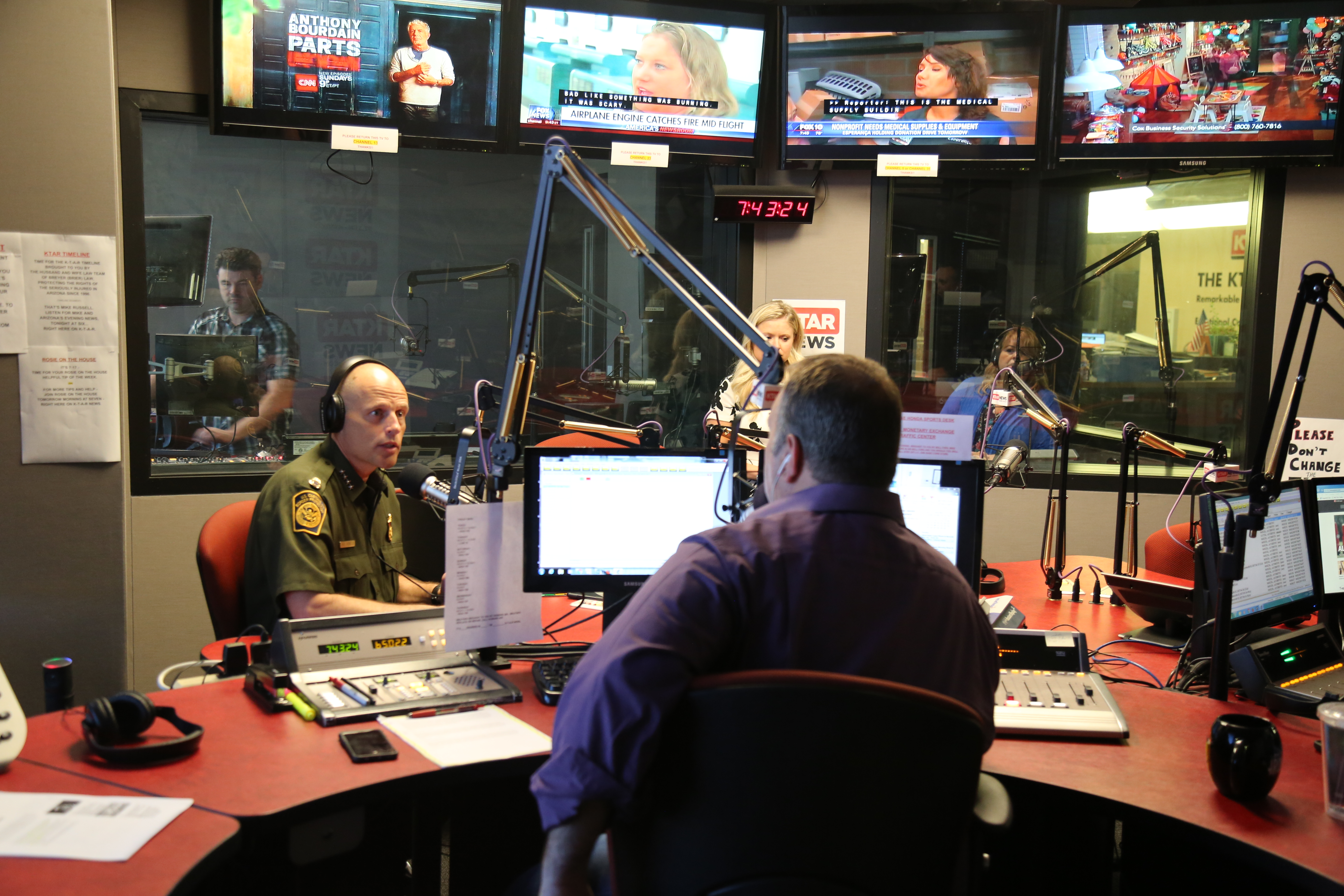
Ronald Vitiello is interviewed during KTAR's morning news in 2017

In 2006, Emmis sold the station to Bonneville International. In turn, Bonneville announced it would move the news/talk format airing on KTAR (620 AM) to 92.3 FM. The change would begin on September 18, 2006. That same day, KKFR became KTAR-FM. The AM station merged its programming with KMVP, the local ESPN Radio sports radio station. The merger was complete by January 1, 2007.

As KTAR-FM carried all news/talk programming, KTAR AM became "Arizona Sports 620". (On September 15, 2014, KTAR AM became "ESPN Phoenix 620 AM" with the local "Arizona Sports" format moving to 98.7 FM on January 6, 2014.) KMVP was divested to the non-profit Cesar Chavez Foundation on March 9, 2017.

== Programming ==
KTAR-FM airs a mix of local and nationally syndicated talk shows. Weekdays begin with Arizona's Morning News anchored by Jim Sharpe and Jayme West. That's followed by local talk with The Mike Broomhead Show. In afternoons, The Chris & Joe Show is heard (Chris Merrill and Joe Huizenga) followed by Outspoken with Bruce and Gaydos (Bruce St. James and Larry Gaydos). Syndicated shows include The Ramsey Show with Dave Ramsey, heard in early afternoons and early evenings. That's followed by The Chad Benson Show, Red Eye Radio and This Morning, America's First News with Gordon Deal.

Weekends feature specialty shows on money, health, home improvement, cars, real estate and gardening. Some weekend programs are paid brokered programming. Syndicated weekend shows include The Kim Komando Show, Rosie on The House and Music and the Spoken Word. Most hours begin with an update from ABC News Radio.

== HD radio ==
KTAR-FM broadcasts in the HD Radio hybrid format. The HD2 digital subchannel carries the Latter-day Saints Channel, aimed at members of the Church of Jesus Christ of Latter-day Saints, which owns Bonneville International. Programming originates from Temple Square in Salt Lake City. It broadcasts lifestyle and religious shows.
