= KEPN =

ESPN Radio affiliate in Lakewood, Colorado

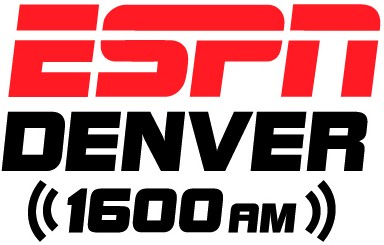
- Lakewood, Colorado; United States
- Broadcast area: Denver metro area
- Frequency: 1600 kHz
- Branding: 1600 ESPN Denver

Programming
- Language: English
- Format: Sports radio
- Affiliations: ESPN Radio; Westwood One Sports

Ownership
- Owner: Bonneville International; (Bonneville International Corporation)
- Sister stations: KKFN; KOSI; KYGO-FM

History
- First air date: January 8, 1955
- Former call signs: KLAK (1955–87); KRXY (1987–93); KWMX (1993–94); KYGO (1994–99); KCKK (1999–2006)
- Former frequencies: 1580 kHz (1955–57)
- Call sign meaning: ESPN Radio

Technical information
- Licensing authority: FCC
- Facility ID: 30823
- Class: B
- Power: 5,000 watts
- Transmitter coordinates: 39°39′20″N 105°4′29.9″W
- Repeater: 104.3 KKFN-HD2 (Longmont)

Links
- Public license information: Public file; LMS
- Webcast: Listen live Listen live (via Audacy)
- Website: denverfan.com/espn-denver-1600/

KEPN (1600 AM) is a commercial radio station licensed to Lakewood, Colorado, and serving the Denver metropolitan area. It is owned by Salt Lake City–based Bonneville International with studios and located in Greenwood Village, and the transmitter is in Lakewood.

== History ==
=== Early years ===
On January 8, 1955, the station signed on as KLAK. It was originally on AM 1580 and was a daytimer transmitting 250 watts, required to be off the air at night. KLAK was owned by the Lakewood Broadcasting Service Company and played country music. In 1957, the station moved to AM 1600 and increased power to 1,000 watts, allowing the station to broadcast around the clock.

In 1961, KLAK increased power again to 5,000 watts. Five years later, KLAK added an FM radio station at 107.7 MHz. (The FM station is now 107.5 KQKS, owned by Entercom.) KLAK-AM-FM simulcast their country music format, and would continue to partially or completely simulcast through the FM's run under beautiful music, adult contemporary, Top 40/CHR and Hot AC formats (1600 would also adopt the KRXY and KWMX call letters during this era).

=== Country music ===
In 1994, the station became KYGO. It was a classic country station, separately programmed from more current-based KYGO-FM.

In 1999, 1600 KYGO flipped to a simulcast of KCKK-FM (now KKFN), which was also airing a classic country format called "K104.3", and eventually changed its calls to KCKK to match its FM counterpart. When the FM station switched to smooth jazz in 2000, the classic country format continued exclusively on AM 1600, rebranded as "16 Kicks". The format would later be moved to another station in the market, KYOL, which took the KCKK call letters (now Christian radio station KPLS).

=== Sports era ===
The Lincoln Financial Group acquired the station in 2006. On January 1, 2007, 1600 AM became the Denver network affiliate of ESPN Radio, with a call letter change to KEPN. In September 2012, the ESPN affiliation moved to 105.5 KJAC, with KEPN switching its programming to Fox Sports Radio.

On December 8, 2014, Entercom announced it would purchase Lincoln Financial Group's entire 15-station lineup in a $106.5 million deal. Entercom would operate the outlets under a Local Marketing Agreement (LMA) until the purchase was finalized. On December 22, 2014, Entercom announced that it would retain KEPN's sports format. The FCC approved the deal on June 26, 2015. However, on July 14, 2015, the Department of Justice forced Entercom to spin off KEPN, KOSI, KKFN and KYGO-FM to Bonneville International in exchange for Bonneville's KSWD in Los Angeles to meet ownership and market revenue limits. Both Bonneville and Entercom began operating their new clusters via Time Brokerage Agreements on July 17, 2015, until the transaction was consummated on November 24, 2015.

On January 4, 2016, KEPN re-affiliated with ESPN Radio after a three-year absence, carrying the network full-time, with KKFN simulcasting during overnights and some weekend hours. The move falls in line with Bonneville's practice of having an AM/FM Sports radio combination airing ESPN Radio on AM and local programming on FM.

On January 3, 2023, it was announced that the station would be rebranded as "Denver Sports".
