= Jamie White =

American radio personality and actress (born 1968)

- Born: December 6, 1968 (age 57); Energy, Illinois, U.S.
- Occupations: Radio personality, actress
- Years active: 1990-Present

Jamie White is an American radio personality and actress who hosted mornings on KYSR Star 98.7 in Los Angeles from 1998 to 2007.

White has also played a part in a few movies, her largest movie role being an MTV VJ and groupie in the 2001 movie Rock Star (Jamie's best friend, Heidi Mark, was also in that movie). She's also had a few appearances on TV shows including Rock Star: Supernova when she interviewed a group of final contestants, including some bickering with winner Lukas Rossi.

== Biography ==
Jamie was born December 6, 1968, in the town of Energy, Illinois, She has one sister, Mary Jo White-McCurdy, who still resides in Southern Illinois and is a community leader. She shares a very tight bond with her sister and father. Jamie took a modeling job in St. Louis, Missouri, that led to a career in radio broadcasting. Jamie was married to a prominent Denver orthopedic surgeon. Her personal website cites her divorce and her mother's battle with cancer as influential to her on-air personality. Jamie and her sister formed the Nancy White Breast Cancer Fund after their mother's passing to assist in the financial burden of women undergoing treatment.

In 1994, she was hired by Denver's KALC Alice 105.9 along with Frosty Stilwell and Frank Kramer, to host the "Jamie, Frosty and Frank Show", which became the number one morning show in Denver. In 1998, she moved to Los Angeles when the show was moved to KYSR Star 98.7 (while still being syndicated to Denver on KALC). The "Jamie and Danny" show was also syndicated to KALC until the summer of 2000, then returned to Denver on KFMD (now KDHT) from July 9, 2001 until April 27, 2005, when the station switched to an "Urban" format. The show remained on Star 98.7 until July 1, 2005, when Bonaduce was fired from the station and replaced with Technical Producer Jack Heine and producer Mike Roberts (a.k.a. "Stench") to form the "Jamie, Jack and Stench" weekday morning show. This show was taken off the air on April 10, 2006, along with the rest of the Star 98.7 DJs, but the morning show returned a month later on May 8.

White was also involved in an on-air argument with KFI AM 640 host Bill Handel on December 15, 2006, that resulted in Handel being suspended for using obscene, threatening language. White had asked Handel's two 12-year-old girls to stay out of the KYSR studios (in premises shared with KFI and other Clear Channel stations). In a tape of the exchange aired on KTLA-TV - with four sections 'bleeped' - Handel tells White "If you ever talk to my kids that way again, Jamie, I'm gonna kick your [bleep]", criticizes her "[bleep] losing numbers on this loser show" and shouts "Don't you touch me!" as he leaves the studio. The recording concludes with two bleeped f-bombs and White shouting "Get outta here, Bill. You're nuts!" Handel later apologized to the "Jamie, Jack and Stench Show", saying he lost his temper.

On January 3, 2007, she was let go from KYSR when the station announced that the "Jamie, Jack, & Stench" morning show would not be returning from the holiday hiatus.

On March 8, 2007, Jack and Stench (Stretch) started their own subscription podcast. Jamie White joined them from September 14, 2007 until June 8, 2009 when started a new job with 106.5 The Buzz in Sacramento, CA on the Morning Show with Ryan Beaman. On April 22, 2011, Jamie announced that she was leaving 106.5 The Buzz in Sacramento to stay home and raise her son.

On January 9, 2012, Jamie White returned to the KALC Alice 105.9 Denver morning show currently hosted by BJ Harris, replacing host Erica Cobb.

== Legal problem ==
On July 11, 2009, White was arrested at 1:30 am for an undisclosed felony after an altercation with her boyfriend. She was released at 6:14 am the same day on $50,000 bail from the LAPD Pacific Division and due back in court on August 5, 2009. The charges against White were eventually dropped.

== Filmography ==
Film
Year	Film	Role	Other notes
2001	Rock Star	MTV VJ	
Television
Year	Title	Role	Notes
2006	Rock Star: Supernova	Herself	
