= KYGO-FM =

Country music radio station in Denver

- Denver, Colorado; United States
- Broadcast area: Denver metro area
- Frequency: 98.5 MHz (HD Radio)
- Branding: 98-5 KYGO

Programming
- Format: Country music
- Subchannels: HD2: Classic country
- Affiliations: Compass Media Networks; United Stations Radio Networks

Ownership
- Owner: Bonneville International; (Bonneville International Corporation)
- Sister stations: KEPN; KKFN; KOSI

History
- First air date: December 1, 1953
- Former call signs: KFML (1953–1974); KIMN-FM (1974–1979); KYGO (1979–1988)

Technical information
- Licensing authority: FCC
- Facility ID: 30829
- Class: C
- ERP: 100,000 watts
- HAAT: 555 meters (1,821 ft)
- Transmitter coordinates: 39.676°N 105.486°W

Links
- Public license information: Public file; LMS
- Webcast: Listen live; Listen live (HD2)
- Website: www.kygo.com

KYGO-FM (98.5 MHz) is a commercial radio station in Denver, Colorado, United States. The Bonneville International country music station has an effective radiated power (ERP) of 100,000 watts. Its studios are located in Greenwood Village, and its transmitter is on Mestaa'ehehe Mountain near Morrison.

KYGO-FM is Colorado's secondary (LP-2) Emergency Alert System station. AM 850 KOA is the primary (LP-1) station.

The radio station broadcasts in the HD Radio format. The HD2 subchannel broadcasts classic country music as "KYGO Legendary Country." The HD3 subchannel formerly simulcasted the Contemporary Christian format heard on KTLF in Colorado Springs. The HD3 subchannel has since been turned off.

== History ==
=== KFML-FM and KIMN-FM ===
The station signed on the air on December 1, 1953, as KFML-FM. It was owned by Everett A. Bancker, Jr. and was the FM counterpart to KFML (1390 AM, now KGNU). Because the AM station was a daytimer, listeners could continue to hear its programming after sunset on KFML-FM.

Following the sale of the station to Jefferson-Pilot Broadcasting in 1974, the station took the KIMN-FM call sign. (The callsign KIMN currently resides at 100.3 FM in Denver, though that station is owned by Kroenke Sports & Entertainment.)

At first, KIMN-FM aired a softer album rock format while KIMN (950 AM, now KKSE) aired a Top 40 format. KIMN-FM later started playing Top 40 music, similar to its AM sister station. In the 1970s, there were a couple of country & western AM stations in Denver, though the music was not heard on FM, even though country was making inroads on FM stations in other cities.

=== Switch to KYGO Country ===
On July 7, 1980, 98.5 switched its call letters to KYGO; later that year, the station changed formats from contemporary hits to country music. Bob Call, previously with country-formatted WSOC-FM in Charlotte, North Carolina, supervised the change. When he started at WSOC-FM, he said he knew little about country music, but learned fast. In 2006, as part of Lincoln Financial Media's acquisition of Jefferson-Pilot (including the J-P media properties), KYGO became a Lincoln Financial Media station.

On April 26, 1988, the station slightly changed its call letters to KYGO-FM. At the same time, AM 950 switched its call sign to KYGO, and began airing a classic country format, to be a companion to FM 98.5's more contemporary country direction.

In 2007, KYGO-FM was named "Country Music Station of the Year" in a top 25 market by Radio & Records magazine. Other nominees included WUSN Chicago, WYCD Detroit, KEEY-FM Minneapolis, WXTU Philadelphia, and KSON-FM San Diego.

=== Ownership change ===
On December 8, 2014, Entercom announced it would purchase Lincoln Financial Group's entire 15-station lineup (including KYGO) in a $106.5 million deal. It operated the outlets under a local marketing agreement (LMA). On December 22, 2014, Entercom confirmed it would retain KYGO and its country format. The FCC approved the deal on June 26, 2015.

However, on July 14, 2015, the Department of Justice ruled that Entercom was over ownership and total market revenue limits in the Denver market; as a result, Entercom decided to spin off KYGO, KOSI, KKFN and KEPN to Bonneville International in exchange for Bonneville's Los Angeles station KSWD (now KKLQ). Both Bonneville and Entercom began operating their new clusters via Time Brokerage Agreements on July 17, 2015. The transaction was consummated on November 24, 2015.

=== Taylor Swift incident ===
KYGO hired David Mueller as a DJ in January 2013. Mueller co-hosted the Ryno and Jackson morning show. On June 2, 2013, Mueller attended a meet-and-greet event before a Taylor Swift concert at the Pepsi Center. While having her photograph taken with Mueller, Swift alleged that he reached under her skirt and groped her. Though Mueller denied touching Swift inappropriately, KYGO-FM general manager Robert Call fired him on June 4. Mueller sued Swift in September 2015 for loss of income, alleging that her allegation had led to his wrongful termination. Swift sued Mueller the next month. A civil trial began August 7, 2017. A jury found Mueller liable for assault and battery and awarded Swift one dollar, the amount she had sought.
