= KPLS (AM) =

Radio station in Littleton–Denver, Colorado

- Littleton, Colorado; United States
- Broadcast area: Denver metropolitan area
- Frequency: 1510 kHz
- Branding: Positive Lifestyle Radio

Programming
- Format: Christian radio

Ownership
- Owner: Radio 74 Internationale

History
- First air date: August 27, 1957
- Former call signs: KUDY (1957–1960); KMOR (1960–1964); KDKO (1964–2002); KNRC (2002–2003); KCUV (2003–2006); KYOL (3/2006-12/2006); KCKK (2006–2020)
- Call sign meaning: "Positive Lifestyle"

Technical information
- Licensing authority: FCC
- Facility ID: 52249
- Class: B
- Power: 10,000 watts daytime 25,000 watts nighttime
- Transmitter coordinates: 39°52′08″N 104°55′38.9″W
- Translator: 92.9 K225CZ (Boulder)

Links
- Public license information: Public file; LMS
- Website: www.radio74.net

KPLS (1510 AM, "Positive Lifestyle Radio") is an AM radio station licensed to Littleton, Colorado, and serving the Denver metropolitan area. KPLS is owned by Radio 74 Internationale. In May 2020, the station transitioned to airing a Christian radio format following a transfer of ownership.

KPLS has studios and offices on South Union Boulevard in Lakewood and its transmitter is off Riverdale Road in Thornton, Colorado. KPLS is unusual in that its AM transmitter increases power at night, going from 10,000 watts to 25,000 watts. Both the day and night signals are quite directional, in a north-south pattern.

== FM translator ==
KPLS's programming is simulcast on FM via the translator 92.9 K225CZ in Boulder. It was formerly carried by K229BS in Lakewood, Colorado; in 2019, the translator was sold to iHeartMedia, and began simulcasting KDFD on July 8, 2019.

Broadcast translator for KPLS
Call sign	Frequency	City of license	FID	ERP (W)	Class	FCC info
K225CZ	92.9 FM	Boulder, Colorado	203061	250	D	LMS

== History ==
On August 22, 1957, the station first signed on as KUDY. Owned by Bob Rubin from 1960 to 1965 and operated from above the theater at the Woodlawn Shopping Center, the original format was country music.

On April 1, 1960, the station changed its call sign to KMOR, and then again on December 31, 1964, to KDKO. By 1967, the station was known as "Denver's Soul Radio" due to its rhythm & blues format. It broadcast from studios on Santa Fe Road, just south of County Line Road. During its tenure in this format, KDKO, thanks to its popular multiracial disc jockeys, became a ratings success story throughout the Denver market and within the growing African-American community. A bit of notoriety would take place in 1976 when the station served as the co-sponsor of a planned Marvin Gaye concert that was to take place at the Denver Coliseum. Hours before it was to go on, a KDKO staffer told the crowd that Gaye would arrive shortly, only to learn that Gaye was at his home in Los Angeles and was sleeping. This embarrassment led to an uproar at the coliseum. The staffer was taken off the air for his safety after he used foul language at the concertgoers. Several lawsuits were filed alleging fraud and deceiving ticket buyers. Later, KDKO dabbled with disco music (even calling itself "KDisKO") but as disco started to fade, the station returned to its R&B roots.

By 1980, it was sold to a group of investors, who would later sell it to KDKO veteran DJ Jim "Dr. Daddy-O" Walker in 1989. By then, it had become more focused on the African-American community as a full-serviced outlet with a mix of music and talk shows. KDKO would be hit by a series of financial problems that lead to a one-week shutdown in 1992, and tensions among staff and management. Another factor was the emergence of KQKS, an FM rhythmic top 40 station, in the 1990s and its success in targeting Denver's growing multicultural audience that included younger and female listeners, which would spell the end of KDKO, leading to its sale in March 2002 to Phillip Anschutz.

Anschultz flipped the station to news/talk as KNRC on June 26, 2002. After Anschutz's purchase of 1150 AM, and the move of KNRC's format to that frequency, 1510 AM became KCUV in 2003, and adopted an eclectic music format, which would move to KCUV-FM 102.3 in 2005, with 1510 flipping to oldies. The following year, 1510 adopted the KCKK call sign and classic country format that were previously on 1600 AM (which became Denver's new ESPN Radio affiliate), and rebranded as "Real Country".

In late July 2007, KCKK flipped to a sports radio format, operated by Mile High Sports, a multimedia sports-marketing and publishing company based in Denver. The station featured network programming from Sporting News Radio and several local hosts. The sports talk format was briefly suspended and KCKK returned to "Real Country". According to 100000watts.com, the change was due to the expiration of a local marketing agreement. The "Mile High Sports" format remained on KSXT (1570 AM) in Loveland as of August 21, 2007, and returned again to 1510 AM ten days later, on August 31.

On July 31, 2008, "Mile High Sports Radio" was announced as the new radio flagship for the Denver Nuggets, Colorado Avalanche, Colorado Mammoth, and Colorado Rapids. The station also broadcast the football and basketball programs at the Air Force Academy and syndicated National Football League games through the Sports USA Radio Network. In 2008, it broadcast most games of the Mountain West Conference men's basketball tournament. In June 2009, the station renewed its partnership with Kroenke Sports and Entertainment to remain the flagship station of the Nuggets, Avalanche, and Rapids.

In December 2013, KCKK and its translator on 93.7 FM were sold by NRC Broadcasting to Hunt Broadcasting. The purchase was consummated on March 3, 2014, at a price of $1.6 million.

On March 7, 2014, KCKK changed its format to adult hits, branded as "93.7 The Rock". The station was a low-budget operation, with the Hunt family providing the staff and most on-air talent. From 2016 to 2019, longtime Denver radio DJ Hal Moore hosted a show on KCKK, having hosted a show on the 1990s version of KCKK. Moore, not wishing to host an AM-only show, retired from radio at age 79 when Hunt Broadcasting sold the 93.7 FM translator to iHeartMedia (who converted it to a simulcast of KDFD and its new conservative talk format on July 15, 2019.

On January 7, 2020, All Access reported KCKK would be sold to Radio 74 Internationale for $600,000. A post on Radio 74's Facebook page announced the call letters would be changed to KPLS (for "Positive Lifestyle"), with a proposed launch date of March 20, 2020. On May 15, 2020, the purchase by Radio 74 was consummated, with its programming launched on May 22, 2020.

As of December 2024, KPLS was silent due to technical issues at the transmitter site. The station acknowledged the issue on its official website, describing it as a significant and costly problem. During the outage, KPLS encouraged listeners to tune in online, though availability was limited to 20 listeners at a time. As of September 4, 2025, the station returned to the air.
