= KOSI =

- Denver, Colorado; United States
- Broadcast area: Denver metro area
- Frequency: 101.1 MHz (HD Radio)
- Branding: KOSI 101.1

Programming
- Format: Hot AC
- Subchannels: HD2: Latter-day Saints Channel

Ownership
- Owner: Bonneville International; (Bonneville International Corporation)
- Sister stations: KEPN; KKFN; KYGO-FM

History
- First air date: March 3, 1968
- Call sign meaning: Sounds like "cozy"

Technical information
- Licensing authority: FCC
- Facility ID: 67844
- Class: C
- ERP: 98,600 watts; 100,000 with beam tilt
- HAAT: 341 meters (1,119 ft)
- Transmitter coordinates: 39°43′45″N 105°14′6″W

Links
- Public license information: Public file; LMS
- Webcast: Listen live; Listen live (via Audacy)
- Website: kosi101.com

KOSI (101.1 FM) is a commercial radio station licensed to Denver, Colorado, United States. Owned by Bonneville International, KOSI airs an adult contemporary format, with studios on East Orchard Road in Greenwood Village and transmitter sited on Mount Morrison in Genesee, above the Red Rocks Amphitheatre.

KOSI broadcasts in HD Radio and carries the Latter-day Saints Channel on its HD2 subchannel. KOSI's parent company, Bonneville, is a subsidiary of the Church of Jesus Christ of Latter-day Saints.

== History ==
=== Construction and launch ===
KOSI-FM initially planned to begin broadcasting in the summer of 1967, coinciding with the completion of a new 5,400 square foot studio in northwestern Aurora. The new studio cost more than $367,000 and included a 5,000-watt coverage transmitter. KOSI-FM would be joined in the new facility by its sister station, KOSI (now KAMP).

The studio was not complete in summer 1967 and was delayed to November 5, 1967. That meant the launch of KOSI-FM was postponed to spring 1968.

=== Beautiful music ===
On March 3, 1968, KOSI-FM officially signed on the air. The station used the tagline "The World's Most Beautiful Music" at launch. The station broadcast full time in FM stereo. It aired a beautiful music format, including instrumental cover songs of popular adult standards, Hollywood and Broadway show tunes. KOSI FM initially broadcast from 6 am until midnight each day.

KOSI-FM began 24/7 programming on March 2, 1970, after receiving hundreds of requests to have round-the-clock music. KOSI-FM and KOSI AM simulcast during the overnight hours from midnight until 6 am, broadcasting instrumental music and occasional vocals. Commercials during these hours were limited to six minutes per hour. Both stations resumed separate programming from 6 am until midnight each day. The stations were owned by William L. Armstrong, who would later become a Republican Congressman and two term U.S. Senator.

=== Easy listening ===
KOSI-FM transitioned to easy listening music by 1980. It added more vocals and reduced the instrumental titles. It had hourly news briefs and weather reports. In 1981, KOSI-FM was simulcast in Steamboat Springs on channel 97 through an installation of a translator on Mount Werner.

Armstrong sold KOSI-AM-FM to Westinghouse Broadcasting in 1981. KOSI AM became KEZW in March of that year, carrying an adult standards format, while KOSI-FM continued playing easy listening music.

In 1983, KOSI-FM added a subsidiary communications authority (SCA) service. On regular FM radios, the service could not be heard. But businesses and restaurants with an SCA receiver could pay a fee for all music with no commercials. Among all radio stations in Denver, KOSI was rated number one with a 9.5% share.

In February 1985, the power cable for the Steamboat Springs translator went out of commission, causing KOSI-FM to go off the air for the area. It was replaced with pop station KQIX-FM (now KMGJ) in Grand Junction. The station was restored in July of that year.

In 1985, KOSI-FM was rated the number one station in Denver for people aged 25 and 44. The station remained number one in 1986.

=== Move to adult contemporary ===
In 1988, Westinghouse sold KOSI and KEZW to D&D Broadcasting, Inc. for $15.5 million. In the 1980s, many easy listening stations found their audiences getting older, and not as attractive to advertisers. In response, KOSI began adding more vocals and deleting some instrumental songs.

In 1989, KOSI and KEZW were sold to Shepard Communications of Grand Rapids for $15 million.

Going into 1990, KOSI general manager Joe Davidman spent several thousands of dollars on research and found less than 9 percent of the stations audience cared about hearing instrumentals.

On February 6, 1990, KOSI made the transition to soft adult contemporary music and became known as the "light and easy" station. The station played all vocals, dropping instrumental versions of songs and replacing them with their original. After switching formats, KOSI rose in the station's target 25-54 audience and the profitability of the station more than doubled. In 1991, KOSI was rated the second most listened to station in Denver.

In 1992, KOSI launched a regular Saturday evening show called the "KOSI Copacabana." This show featured four hours of disco music. The show included dance and party songs from the 70's, 80's and 90's. In 1992, KOSI was number 3 in the Denver market. On January 6, 1993, Tribune Broadcasting acquired KOSI and KEZW for $19.5 million. This put the stations under common ownership with KWGN-TV.

=== Lite Rock ===
By 1996, KOSI switched to what it described as "Lite Rock", dropping several non-rock artists thought to be older-sounding. The station remained third among ages 12+ and ages 18–49.

Following the September 11 attacks in 2001, KOSI pulled several current hit songs from the air. These included Annie Lennox's "Walking on Broken Glass" and Bruce Springsteen's "I'm on Fire".

=== Adult contemporary ===
By 2002, KOSI began adding more upbeat titles and soft-pop hits to the playlist, making the transition to a mainstream adult contemporary format aimed at young adults. In December 2002, KOSI and KEZW were sold to Entercom.

KOSI continued airing soft rock and adult contemporary music in the early 2000s. KOSI jumped to number 1 in the ratings for Denver in 2006.

From 2007 to 2011, KOSI aired the nationally syndicated call-in and request show, "Delilah" on weekday evenings. Delilah has since been replaced with local programming.

On July 14, 2015, as part of a merger with Lincoln Financial Media, and to be in compliance with ownership caps and total market revenue limits, the Department of Justice required Entercom to spin off four Denver stations, KOSI, KYGO-FM, KKFN and KEPN, to Bonneville International in exchange for Bonneville's KSWD in Los Angeles (now KKLQ). This resulted in KOSI and KEZW being separately owned for the first time. Both Bonneville and Entercom began operating their new clusters via Time Brokerage Agreements on July 17, 2015, until the transaction was consummated on November 24, 2015.
