= Auto insurance risk selection =

Auto insurance risk selection is the process by which vehicle insurers determine whether or not to insure an individual and what insurance premium to charge. Depending on the jurisdiction, the insurance premium can be either mandated by the government or determined by the insurance company in accordance to a framework of regulations set by the government. Often, the insurer will have more freedom to set the price on physical damage coverages than on mandatory liability coverages.

When the premium is not mandated by the government, it is usually derived from the calculations of an actuary based on statistical data. The premium can vary depending on many factors that are believed to affect the expected cost of future claims. Those factors can include the car characteristics, the coverage selected (deductible, limit, covered perils), the profile of the driver (age, gender, driving history) and the usage of the car (commute to work or not, predicted annual distance driven).

== History ==
Conventional methods for determining costs of motor vehicle insurance involve gathering relevant historical data from a personal interview with, or a written application completed by, the applicant for the insurance and by referencing the applicant's public motor vehicle driving record that is maintained by a governmental agency, such as a Bureau of Motor Vehicles. Such data results in a classification of the applicant to a broad actuarial class for which insurance rates are assigned based upon the empirical experience of the insurer. Many factors are deemed relevant to such classification in a particular actuarial class or risk level, such as age, sex, marital status, location of residence and driving record.

The current system of insurance creates groupings of vehicles and drivers (actuarial classes) based on the following types of classifications.

- Vehicle: Age; manufacturer, model; and value.
- Driver: Age; sex; marital status; driving record (based on government reports), violations (citations); at fault accidents; and place of residence.
- Coverage: Types of losses covered, liability, uninsured or underinsured motorist, comprehensive, and collision; liability limits; and deductibles.

The classifications, such as age, are further broken into actuarial classes, such as 21- to 24-year-olds, to develop a unique vehicle insurance cost based on the specific combination of attributes for a particular risk. For example, the following information would produce a unique vehicle insurance cost:

- Vehicle: Age – 7 years old; manufacturer, model – Ford, Explorer XLT; value $18,000
- Driver: Age – 38 years old; gender – male; marital status – single; driving record (based on government reports) violations – 1 point (speeding); at fault accidents – 3 points (one at fault accident); place of residence 33619 (zip code)
- Coverage: Types of losses covered; liability – yes; uninsured or underinsured – no; motorist comprehensive – yes; collision – yes; liability limits – $100,000/$300,000/$50,000; deductibles – $500/$500.

A change to any of this information might result in a different premium being charged if the change resulted in a different actuarial class or risk level for that variable. For instance, a change in the drivers' age from 38 to 39 may not result in a different actuarial class because 38- and 39-year-old people may be in the same actuarial class. However, a change in driver age from 38 to 45 may result in a different premium because the records of the insurer indicate a difference in risk associated with those ages and, therefore, the age difference results in a change in actuarial class or assigned risk level.

Current insurance rating systems also provide discounts and surcharges for some types of use of the vehicle, equipment on the vehicle and type of driver. Common surcharges and discounts include:

- Surcharges: Business use.
- Discounts: Safety equipment on the vehicle airbags, and anti-lock brakes; theft control devices passive systems (e.g. The Club), and alarm system; and driver type – good student, and safe driver (accident free); group – senior drivers fleet drivers .

== Usage-based insurance ==
Conventional rating systems are primarily based on past realized losses and the past record of other drivers with similar characteristics. More recently, electronic systems have been introduced whereby the actual driving performance of a given driver is monitored and communicated directly to the insurance company. The insurance company then assigns the driver to a risk class based on the monitored driving behavior. An individual, therefore, can be put into different risk classes from month to month depending upon how they drive. For example, a driver who drives long distance at high speed in one month might be placed into a high risk class for that month and pay a large premium. The same driver who drives for short distances at low speed the next month might be placed into a lower risk class and charged a lower premium.
