= KALC =

Hot adult contemporary radio station in Denver

- Denver, Colorado; United States
- Broadcast area: Denver metropolitan area
- Frequency: 105.9 MHz (HD Radio)
- Branding: Alice 105.9

Programming
- Language: English
- Format: Hot adult contemporary-leaning Top 40 (CHR)
- Subchannels: HD2: Channel Q

Ownership
- Owner: Audacy, Inc.; (Audacy License, LLC)
- Sister stations: KAMP; KQKS; KQMT

History
- First air date: June 21, 1965
- Former call signs: KBPI (1965–1994); KAKL (5/1994–6/1994)
- Call sign meaning: "Alice"

Technical information
- Licensing authority: FCC
- Facility ID: 59601
- Class: C
- ERP: 100,000 watts
- HAAT: 524 meters (1,719 ft)
- Transmitter coordinates: 39.7328°N 105.2361°W

Links
- Public license information: Public file; LMS
- Webcast: Listen live (via Audacy)
- Website: www.audacy.com/alice1059

KALC (105.9 FM) – branded Alice 105.9 – is a commercial hot adult contemporary-leaning Top 40 (CHR) radio station located in Denver, Colorado. Owned by Audacy, Inc., it serves the Denver metropolitan area. KALC’s studios are located in the Denver Tech Center, while the transmitter resides on Lookout Mountain in nearby Golden, with a backup transmitter on Ruby Hill in Denver. Besides a standard analog transmission, KALC broadcasts over two HD Radio channels, and is available online via Audacy.

== History ==
=== KBPI years ===
On June 21, 1965, the station signed on as KBPI, airing a progressive rock music format. The owner and general manager of the station was Bill Pierson, who named KBPI for "Bill Pierson Incorporated". The station was powered at 30,000 watts, a third of its current output.

Pierson sold the station in 1974 to the radio division of Sandusky Newspapers, Inc., based in Ohio. Led by general manager Toney Brooks and program director Frank Cody, the station adopted an album-oriented rock (AOR) format and created the slogan "KBPI Rocks the Rockies". The station was later owned by Frank Wood Jr., general manager of WEBN in Cincinnati, under the corporate name Progressive Broadcasters Incorporated, later renamed Secret Communications.

=== Creating "Alice" ===
On April 20, 1994, at 6 p.m., Secret moved KBPI and its rock format to former competitor KAZY (106.7 FM). KALC then came on the air as the first modern adult contemporary station, playing the adult-leaning hits from the modern rock charts, and was branded as "Alice 106". The format was created by Frank Wood Jr., Chuck Finney, and Gregg Cassidy, with Wood referring to the new format as "Warped AC". The sound was a combination of modern AC hits and creative DJs and production.

The original KALC airstaff in 1994 included Frosty Stillwell, Jamie White and Frank Kramer in mornings, Chris Davis in middays, and Alan Kabel in afternoons, along with music director Jim Lawson, creative production director Kelly Michaels, and program director Gregg Cassidy. Other on-air staff members included Jackie Selby, Cha Cha, JoJo Turnbeaugh, Tuna, Steve Weed, Shannon Stone, Patsy, Ethan, Brandon Scott, Chad Steele and Mike "The Real Deal" Neil. Alice's audio was developed by chief engineer Jeff Garrett, while Liz Young served as marketing director. Other stations around the U.S. also picked up the "Alice" name and format. KALC first used the temporary calls KAKL.

=== Change in ownership ===
Chancellor Media acquired KALC in 1996. Chancellor and Capstar Broadcasting announced in August 1998 that they would merge (Hicks, Muse, Tate & Furst was a major shareholder in both companies); upon the merger's completion in July 1999, the combined company was named AMFM Inc. AMFM was in turn acquired by Clear Channel Communications in a deal announced on October 4, 1999, and completed in August 2000. Clear Channel was required to spin off several stations, and KALC was sold to Salem Communications, which in turn, sold the station to Emmis Communications. Emmis sold KALC and then co-owned KXPK to Entercom (now Audacy, Inc.) for $88 million in 2002. KXPK was spun off to Entravision shortly after the sale.

In 2003, the Alice format was modified by newly appointed program drector BJ Harris (formerly Director of Top 40/CHR Programming for Clear Channel Communications and half of the "MJ and BJ Morning Show" based at WFLZ in Tampa). KALC would subsequently rebrand as "Alice 105.9", with a new logo to accent the changes.

=== Personnel changes ===
In early 2004, The Alice Morning Show (Gregg Thunder, Bo Reynolds and Slacker) went through several changes, as Reynolds took a break from radio, and Shea Baker was hired to replace Reynolds and joined Gregg Thunder and Slacker in studio. In November, Gregg Thunder decided to move back home to his hometown of Minneapolis, Minnesota, with co-host Slacker moving to afternoons and Reynolds rejoining Alice to create the "Slacker and Bo Afternoon Show". Program director BJ Harris took over the morning show with Shea Baker and hired Howie Drummond from Cincinnati, Ohio as another one of his sidekicks. The show was still called the "Alice Morning Show", but sometimes referred to as "The BJ, Shea and Howie Morning Show".

In early 2005, BJ stepped down as the program director of Alice. A short time later, a new Program Director (Charese Fruge of KMXB in Las Vegas) was hired; Charese then hired midday talent Sam Hill to replace departing Kevin "Koz" Koske, who left for WTMX in Chicago. In addition, Davin Fesmire replaced night show host George McFly.

The "Alice Morning Show" was ready for some changes too; in 2005, Shea Baker was replaced with Denver market veteran Jennifer Wilde. At that point, the show's name became "The BJ, Howie and Jennifer Morning Show." The show was a hit with Denver listeners, often finishing top three among female listeners. In 2006, Bo Reynolds left the afternoon show, replaced by Alice veteran Steve Weed, creating the "Slacker and Steve Afternoon Show."

Dylan Sprague (formerly of WWWQ in Atlanta) took over the programming of "Alice" in January 2008. In November of that year, morning co-host Jennifer Wilde declined a contract renewal and left the "BJ, Howie and Jennifer Morning Show." In January 2009, Erica Cobb (formerly of the "Eddie and Jobo Show" on WBBM-FM in Chicago) would replace Wilde, with the show's name changing to "The BJ, Howie and Erica Morning Show". Erica was replaced by former Alice morning show host Jamie White in 2012, while Howie Drummond left the show in October 2012.

=== HD changes ===
On June 3, 2019, KALC-HD2 picked up the LGBTQ-oriented talk/dance format of "Channel Q".
