= Green Mountain (Lakewood, Colorado) =

Mountain in the state of Colorado

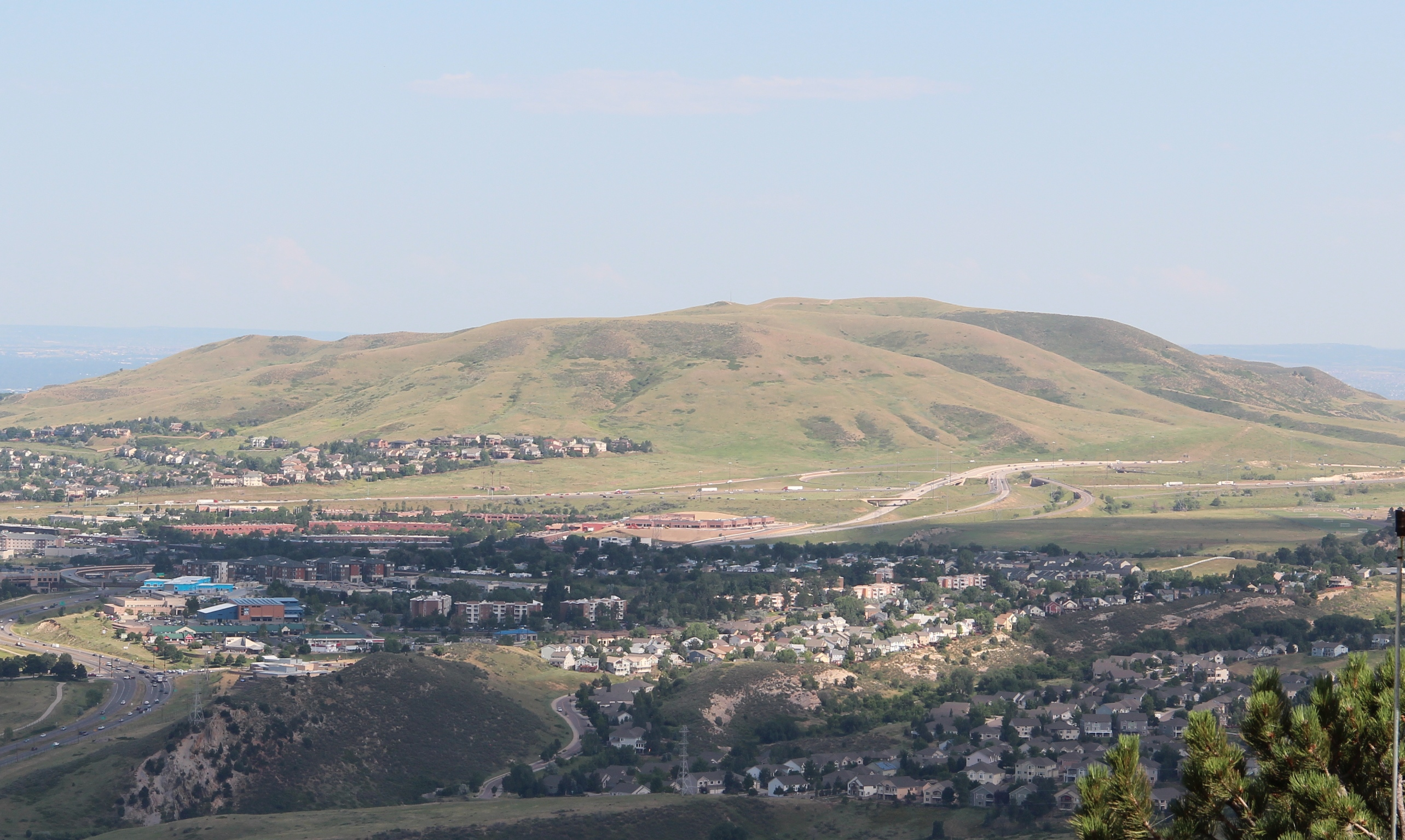
- Green Mountain viewed from Mount Zion

Highest point
- Elevation: 6,854 ft (2,089 m)
- Prominence: 677 ft (206 m)
- Isolation: 2.96 mi (4.76 km)
- Coordinates: 39°42′03″N 105°10′40″W

Geography
- Location within Colorado
- Location: Jefferson County, Colorado, U.S.
- Parent range: Front Range foothills
- Topo map(s): USGS 7.5' topographic map Morrison, Colorado

Climbing
- Easiest route: hike

Green Mountain is a mesa on the eastern flank of the Front Range of the Rocky Mountains of North America. The 6,854-foot (2,089 m) mesa summit is located in William Frederick Hayden Park in the City of Lakewood, Colorado, United States, 4.0 miles (6.5 km) west (bearing 265°) of the municipal center of Lakewood in Jefferson County.

== Historical names ==
- Green Mountain – 1906
- Hendricks Peak
- Mount Hendricks

== See also ==
- List of Colorado mountain ranges
- List of Colorado mountain summits
  - List of Colorado fourteeners
  - List of Colorado 4000 meter prominent summits
  - List of the most prominent summits of Colorado
- List of Colorado county high points
