= Lincoln National Corporation =

American insurance and investment management company

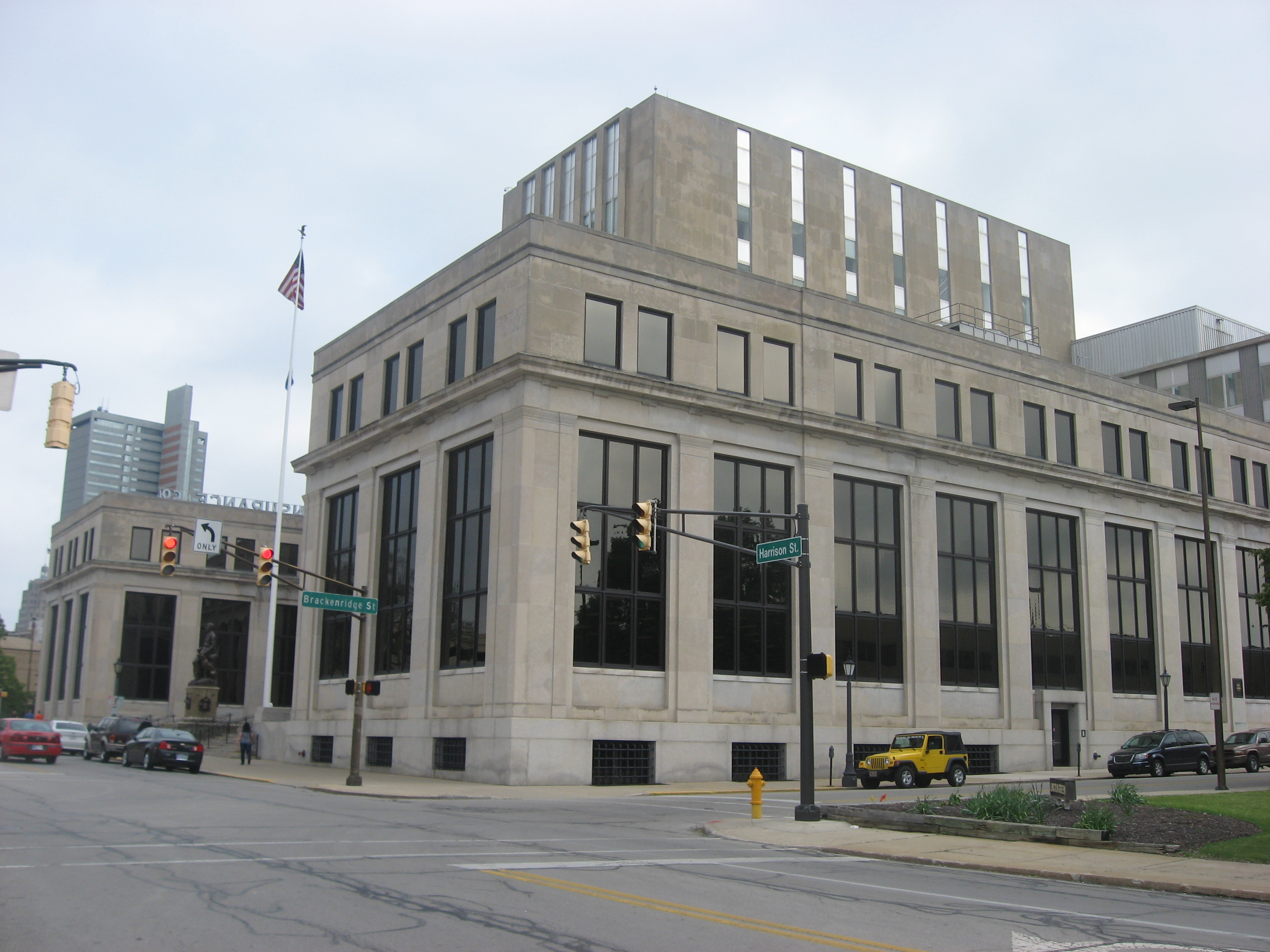
- Trade name: Lincoln Financial Group
- Type: Public
- Traded as: NYSE: LNC; S&P 600 component
- Industry: Insurance; Asset management
- Founded: 1905; 121 years ago
- Founder: Perry Randall
- Headquarters: Radnor, Pennsylvania, U.S.
- Key people: Ellen Cooper (president & CEO)
- Revenue: ▲US$19.230 billion (Fiscal Year Ended December 31, 2021)
- Operating income: ▲US$1.638 billion (Fiscal Year Ended December 31, 2021)
- Net income: ▲US$1.405 billion (Fiscal Year Ended December 31, 2021)
- Total assets: ▲US$387.301 billion (Fiscal Year Ended December 31, 2021)
- Total equity: ▼US$20.272 billion (Fiscal Year Ended December 31, 2021)
- Number of employees: 11,000+ (2022)
- Website: lincolnfinancial.com

Lincoln National Corporation is a Fortune 200 American holding company, which operates multiple insurance and investment management businesses through subsidiary companies. Lincoln Financial Group is the marketing name for LNC and its subsidiary companies.

LNC was organized under the laws of the state of Indiana in 1968, and maintains its principal executive offices in Radnor, Pennsylvania. The company traces its roots to its earliest predecessor founded in 1905.

In addition, LNC is the naming rights sponsor of Lincoln Financial Field in Philadelphia, home field of the Philadelphia Eagles of the National Football League.

== History ==
=== Founding and early history ===
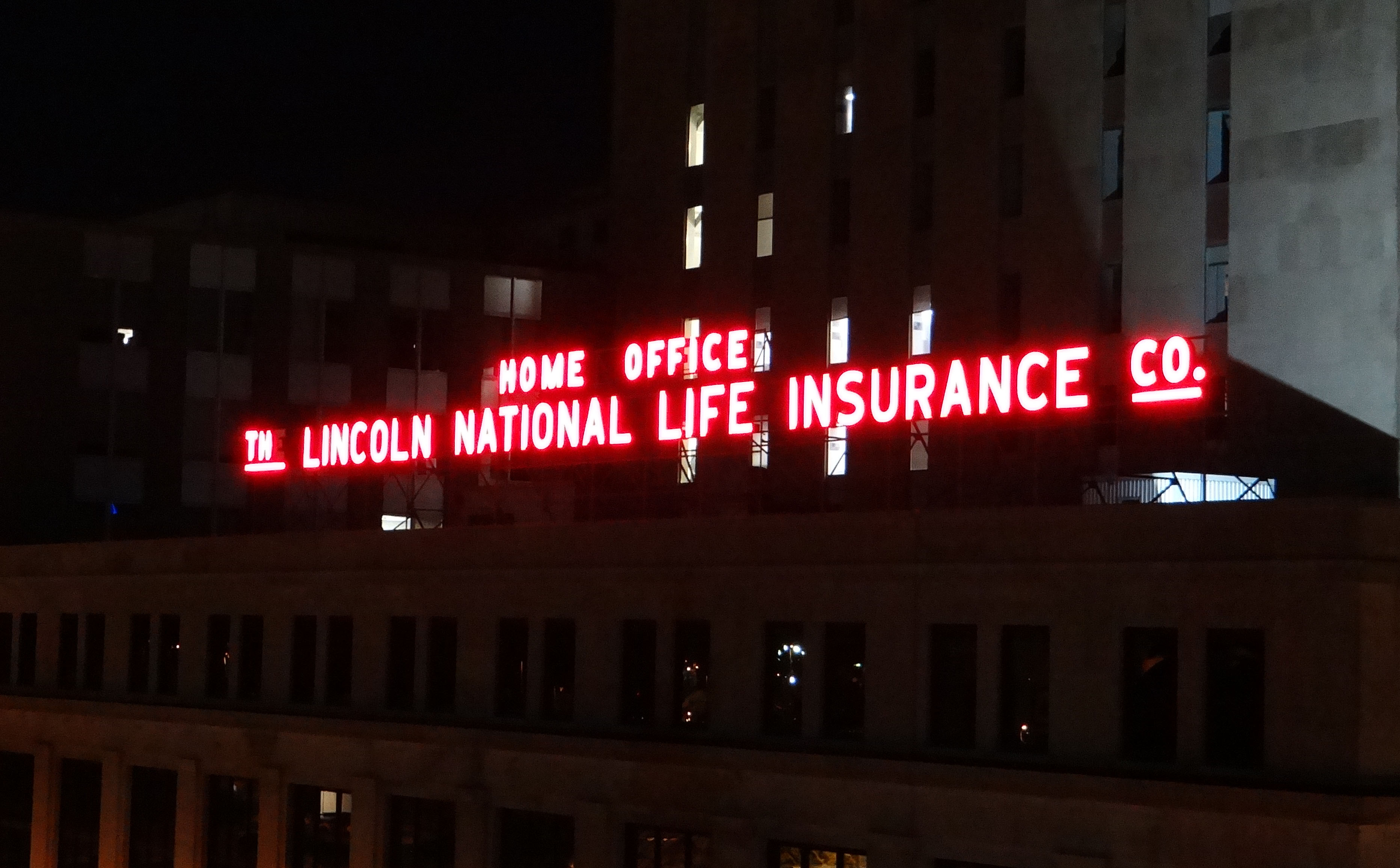
The iconic sign on Lincoln's former corporate headquarters in downtown Fort Wayne, Indiana

Lincoln traces its origin to June 12, 1905, in Fort Wayne, Indiana, as the Lincoln National Life Insurance Company. Four men were founders of the organization, with Daniel Ninde, an attorney, becoming the largest stockholder and first Chief Financial Officer of the company, according to Ninde family history. Daniel Ninde was educated as a midshipman at the United States Naval Academy in Annapolis, MD. He descended from a local Fort Wayne family that included a number of Circuit Court judges. The four founders all worked in various roles at Lincoln National. They bought a smaller insurance company located in North Dakota. Manager Perry Randall, a Fort Wayne attorney and entrepreneur, suggested the name "Lincoln," arguing that the name of Abraham Lincoln would powerfully convey a spirit of integrity. In August 1905 Robert Todd Lincoln provided a photograph of his father, along with a letter authorizing the use of his father's likeness and name for company stationery and advertising.

In 1928, LNC president Arthur Hall hired Dr. Louis A. Warren, a Lincoln scholar, and in 1929, LNC acquired one of the largest collections of books about Abraham Lincoln in the United States. The Lincoln Museum in Fort Wayne was the second-largest Lincoln museum in the country, but closed in June 2008.

Ian Rolland started with Lincoln in 1956, and became president of Lincoln National Life in 1977. When Rolland retired in 1998, new president Jon A. Boscia moved LNC to Philadelphia and started using the Lincoln Financial Group name for marketing. Lincoln National Life, the largest subsidiary, and the Lincoln Museum remained in Fort Wayne.

=== 1990–2007 ===
Lincoln Reinsurance was the first US reinsurance company; it was sold to Swiss Re in 2001. K&K Insurance Specialties was the first to insure events like NASCAR races; it was sold to Aon in 1993. Safeco bought American States, a property/casualty insurance business because Lincoln was primarily in life/health. However, LNC even sold a block of disability income business to MetLife in 1999, as it narrowed its focus.

Lincoln moved its headquarters from Indiana to Philadelphia in 1999. In Philadelphia, Lincoln was headquartered in the West Tower of Centre Square in Center City.

Lincoln Financial was naming rights sponsor for the 2000 Rugby League World Cup which was held in England.

Lincoln Financial Group purchased the Administrative Management Group, Inc. based in Arlington Heights, Illinois in August 2002. Previously, AMG was a strategic partner of LFG for four years, providing recordkeeping services for the Lincoln Alliance product, a turnkey solution for employer retirement and employee benefit programs.

In 2007, the company moved 400 employees, including its top executives, to Radnor Township from Philadelphia.

=== Jefferson-Pilot acquisition ===
Following the acquisition of Jefferson-Pilot Corporation in March 2006, Lincoln Financial acquired group life, disability, and dental insurance divisions. Jefferson-Pilot Corporation was a Fortune 500 company based in Greensboro, North Carolina, founded in 1986 from the merger of Jefferson Standard Insurance (founded 1907 by Charles W. Gold and Pleasant D. Gold Jr., sons of Pleasant Daniel Gold) and Pilot Life Insurance (founded 1903). The two companies' association actually dated to 1945, when Jefferson Standard bought majority control of Pilot Life; Jefferson Standard had previously bailed Pilot out in the 1930s. The Pilot Life headquarters built in the 1920s and located at 5300 High Point Road, "a careful replication of the governor's mansion built in 1767 in New Bern," was nominated to the National Register of Historic Places in 2022, when Clachan Properties of Richmond, Virginia, was buying the property to develop apartments. The 1986 merger marked the retirement of the Pilot Life brand, most notably the end of its "Sail with the Pilot" jingles, which had been heavily associated with Atlantic Coast Conference college basketball and had been heard on television since 1958. The insurance operations would continue to be headquartered in what became the Lincoln Financial Building.

Lincoln Financial also acquired Jefferson-Pilot's television and radio operations, which were renamed Lincoln Financial Media. Jefferson Standard Insurance put WBTV in Charlotte on the air on Channel 3 in 1949. At the time, Jefferson Standard Insurance also had a 16.5% interest in the Greensboro News Company, licensee of WFMY, which signed on from Greensboro two months after WBTV. Jefferson Standard had purchased WBT radio from CBS in 1945. Jefferson Standard Broadcasting Co. was a subsidiary of Jefferson-Pilot Corp. when in 1970 the media interests were folded into a new subsidiary, Jefferson-Pilot Communications, still owned by the insurance company. The broadcasting subsidiary acquired several other radio and television stations across the country, with WBTV serving as the company's flagship station. The group owned 18 radio stations in Miami, Florida; San Diego, California; Denver, Colorado; and Atlanta, Georgia. It also owned WBTV, the CBS affiliate in Charlotte; WCSC-TV, the CBS affiliate in Charleston, South Carolina and WWBT, the NBC affiliate in Richmond, Virginia. In June 2007, the company publicly announced it would explore a sale of this division, and hired Merrill Lynch to assess its strategic options. It was announced on November 12 that Raycom Media purchased the three TV stations, including its sports production division, which was the co-holder to football and basketball games in the Atlantic Coast Conference with Raycom and sole rightsholders to the Southeastern Conference until 2009, when ESPNPlus and CBS Sports acquired the rights. The Raycom Sports brand was merged with LFS as of January 1, 2008.

Though billed as a merger of equals, the merged company carries the LNC name, operates from the LNC offices, with current LNC stockholders holding 61% of the stock, and current LNC directors controlling the new board. The insurance division is based in Greensboro, North Carolina.

=== Liberty Life Acquisition ===
On January 19, 2018, Lincoln Financial Group announced that it entered into a definitive agreement to acquire Liberty Life Assurance Company of Boston from Liberty Mutual Insurance Group. Upon completion of the transaction, Lincoln Financial retained Liberty's Group Benefits business and reinsured Liberty's Individual Life and Annuity business to Protective Life Insurance Company.

=== Recent activity ===
Lincoln purchased Newton County Loan and Savings in order to restructure as a bank holding company and qualify for Troubled Asset Relief Program (TARP) funding.

In January 2009, Lincoln sold its Delaware Investments subsidiary to Macquarie Group. Delaware Investments was integrated into Macquarie's global asset management arm, Macquarie Funds Group effective January 5, 2010.

In December 2023, Lincoln sold its wealth management unit to Osaic for an undisclosed amount.

== Operations ==
LNC divides operations into four business segments: annuities, life insurance, retirement plan services, and group protection.

The principal Lincoln subsidiaries are:

- Lincoln National Life Insurance Company
- Lincoln Life & Annuity Company of New York
- First Penn-Pacific Life Insurance Company
- Lincoln Financial Distributors
- Lincoln Financial Advisors
- Lincoln Financial Securities

== Insurance patent ==
Lincoln National is the owner of U.S. patent 7,089,201, “Method and apparatus for providing retirement income benefits”. This patent covers methods for administering variable annuities. Lincoln's commercial products that are covered by this patent include their i4LIFE Advantage and 4LaterSM Advantage annuities.

In September 2006, Lincoln filed a patent infringement lawsuit against Transamerica Life Insurance Company for allegedly infringing its insurance patent. A similar lawsuit was filed against Jackson National Life in October 2007.

On Feb. 19, 2009, a jury found the Lincoln patent valid and infringed by Transamerica et al. Damages were assessed at the "reasonable royalty rate" and Transamerica et al. were ordered to pay Lincoln $13 million, or 0.11% of the over $12 billion in assets they had under management by virtue of infringing the patent. This verdict was later overturned by the Court of Appeals for the Federal Circuit, finding Transamerica did not infringe Lincoln's patent.

== Affiliations ==
Lincoln Financial Group is the grand sponsor of the National Forensic League and its National Speech and Debate Tournament.

== See also ==
- Lincoln Financial Media—subsidiary of Lincoln National Corporation that owns radio stations in the United States
