= Mass media in Albuquerque, New Mexico =

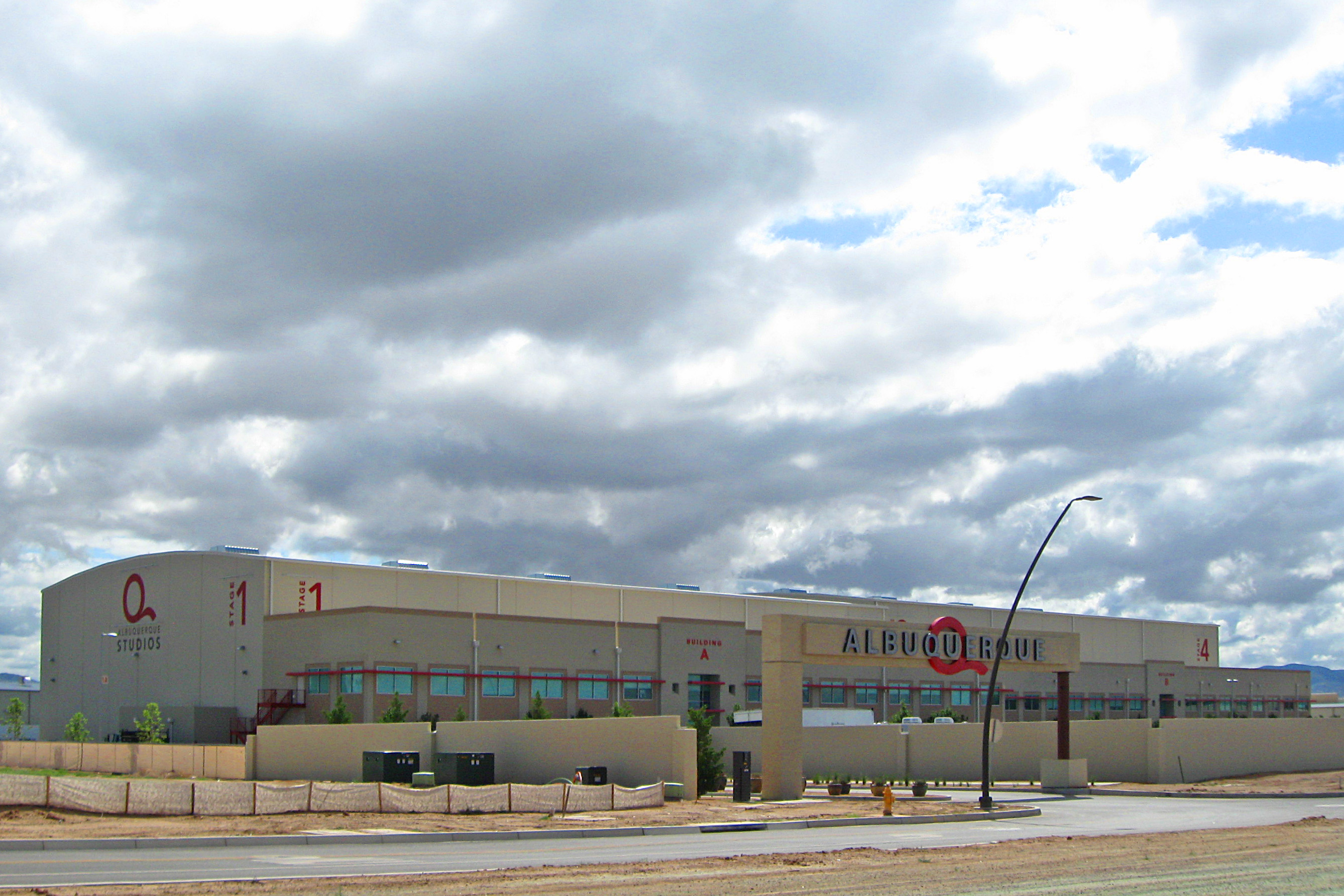
Albuquerque Studios, a production hub owned by Netflix

Albuquerque is the primary media hub of the US state of New Mexico, which includes Santa Fe and Las Cruces. The vistas and adobe architecture of New Mexico are a major backdrop of Western fiction and the Western genre.

Some media conglomerates which operate in the city include Netflix (via its Albuquerque Studios), NBCUniversal, The Walt Disney Company, and Warner Bros. Discovery.

The Albuquerque Journal is to the largest daily newspaper by circulation in the state. Magazines and news publications in the city include Albuquerque the Magazine, Albuquerque Business First, the University of New Mexico's Daily Lobo, Outside, and New Mexico Magazine.

Broadcast networks in the city include ABC/CBS (KOAT-TV), Fox/Independent (KRQE), NBC (KOB), Telemundo (KASA-TV), Trinity Broadcasting Network (KNAT-TV), and Univision (KLUZ-TV). Public Broadcasting has a NM PBS presence through sister stations KNME-TV and KNMD-TV. The public radio station KANW plays New Mexico music.

The following is a list of media operations within the greater Albuquerque metropolitan area, and some media in broader Albuquerque–Santa Fe–Las Vegas and neighboring El Paso–Las Cruces, Texas–New Mexico combined statistical area, which also target Albuquerque.

== Studios ==
- ABC and CBS affiliate KOAT-TV: Hearst Television owns and operates the station and produces local news as Action 7 News, and they produce online program Very Local.
- Albuquerque Studios: One of the main production hubs for Netflix. The studios have been used for numerous major productions including Breaking Bad, The Avengers, Logan, and Stranger Things season 4.
- FOX affiliate KRQE: Production studio for KRQE News 13 and the New Mexico Living programming blocks.
- Cliffdweller Studios: A film production studio active in Rio Rancho and Albuquerque, known for their New Mexico True Television travel series.
- Hubbard Broadcasting station KOB (TV), and their nationwide Reelz digital cable and satellite television network: KOB and Reelz operate independently from one another and have separate facilities, as KOB is affiliated with NBC as well. KOB was the primary production studio for the internationally syndicated Val De La O Show variety show during the 1960s-1980s, it was the first "to pioneer a Spanish-language show on TV" and brought international attention to the New Mexico music, Tejano music, and Texas country music genres. Reelz has created programs such as The Kennedys, and documentaries hosted by Natalie Morales, Deborah Norville, and Geraldo Rivera.
- NBCUniversal: They are currently investing in the Albuquerque area, with a major production studio facility in the metro for their major films and television shows. The television show MacGruber is produced in Albuquerque, as their studio opened in 2021. NBC is affiliated with Hubbard Broadcasting's KOB as well.
- Telemundo station KASA-TV: News studio for Noticias Telemundo Nuevo México. along with KOB and NBC they help to produce Spanish language news for the station.
- Trinity Broadcasting Network station KNAT-TV: Produces numerous televangelism shows for TBN, including Joy In Our Town and various Christian sermons.
- Univision station KLUZ-TV and their affiliate KTFQ-TV: Production studio for the Noticias Nuevo México news program.

== Publications ==
=== Newspapers ===
- Albuquerque Business First: local business news, resources and more; printed weekly, daily morning and afternoon digital editions.
- Albuquerque Journal: the largest newspaper in New Mexico; contains state and local news.
- CNM Chronicle: Central New Mexico Community College's student-run newspaper.
- Daily Lobo: independent student newspaper of the University of New Mexico.
- Valencia County News-Bulletin: weekly paper serving Belen, Bosque Farms, Los Lunas, Peralta, Rio Communities and all of Valencia County, New Mexico.
- The Paper (Albuquerque): free weekly newspaper launched October 2020
- City Desk Albuquerque: free daily news outlet launched January 2024

=== Magazines ===
- Albuquerque the Magazine: a monthly magazine chronicling life in Albuquerque.
- Local Flavor: a free, monthly magazine covering food and wine in northern New Mexico.

== Television ==
=== Full-power ===
- 2 KASA-TV Santa Fe (Telemundo, TeleXitos on 15.1, Roar on 33.1)**
- 4 KOB Albuquerque (NBC)
- 5 KNME-TV Albuquerque (PBS)
- 5 KNMD-TV Santa Fe (KNME-TV in ATSC 3.0)
- 7 KOAT-TV Albuquerque (ABC, with CBS on 7.4)
- 11 KCHF Santa Fe (Religious independent)
- 12 KKAB Truth or Consequences (WEST)**
- 13 KRQE Albuquerque (Fox, with 13.2 programmed as an Independent)
- 14 KLUZ-TV Albuquerque (Univision)
- 19 KWBQ Santa Fe (The CW)**
- 23 KNAT-TV Albuquerque (TBN)**
- 32 KAZQ Albuquerque (Religious independent)
- 41 KTFQ-TV Albuquerque (UniMás)
- 47 KTEL-TV Carlsbad (Cozi TV)**
- 50 KASY-TV Albuquerque (Independent with MyNetworkTV)

=== Low-power ===
- 2.2 KUPT-LD Albuquerque (TeleXitos, Movies! on 16.1)**
- 20 KNMQ-LD Albuquerque
- 21 KYNM-CD Albuquerque
- 25 KQDF-LD Albuquerque
- 36 KTVS-LD Albuquerque
- 38 K34PZ-D Albuquerque (Daystar)**
- 39 KRTN-LD Albuquerque (Cozi TV)**
- 45 KWPL-LD Albuquerque
- 47 KTEL-CD (Telemundo)**

== Broadcast radio ==
A number of radio stations are broadcast from and/or are licensed to Albuquerque, including the following:

=== AM stations ===
- 610 KNML Albuquerque (Sports)
- 700 KDAZ Albuquerque (Conservative talk/Christian)
- 770 KKOB Albuquerque (Talk)
- 810 KSWV Santa Fe (Classic hits)
- 840 KDNF Belen (Classic Country)
- 920 KSVA Albuquerque (LifeTalk Radio)
- 1000 KKIM Albuquerque (Spanish Christian)
- 1050 KTBL Los Ranchos de Albuquerque (Active rock)
- 1080 KEMR Moriarty (Classic hits/Oldies)
- 1100 KRKE Peralta (80s Hits)
- 1150 KNMM Albuquerque (Classic hits)
- 1190 KXKS Albuquerque (Conservative talk)
- 1240 KDSK Los Ranchos de Albuquerque (Oldies)
- 1310 KKNS Corrales (KTNN/Navajo/country)
- 1350 KABQ Albuquerque (Sports)
- 1450 KRZY Albuquerque (Spanish sports)
- 1510 KOAZ Isleta (Smooth jazz)
- 1550 KQNM Albuquerque (Relevant Radio)
- 1600 KIVA Albuquerque (Conservative talk)

=== FM stations ===
Asterisk (*) indicates a non-commercial (public radio/campus/educational) broadcast.

- 88.3 KLYT Albuquerque (Christian)*
- 88.7 KXNM Encino (KANW relay)*
- 89.1 KANW Albuquerque (NPR/talk/New Mexico music)*
- 89.9 KUNM Albuquerque (NPR/talk/variety)*
- 90.3 KANM Grants (News and Talk NPR/BBC)*
- 90.7 KQLV Santa Fe (K-Love)*
- 91.1 KEZF Grants (Spanish Christian)*
- 91.5 KFLQ Albuquerque (Family Life Radio)*
- 92.3 KRST Albuquerque (Country)
- 92.7 KDSK-FM Grants (Oldies)
- 93.3 KOBQ Albuquerque (Contemporary hit radio)
- 94.1 KZRR Albuquerque (Active rock)
- 95.1 KABQ-FM Corrales (Rhythmic oldies)
- 95.5 KHFM Santa Fe (Classical)*
- 96.3 KKOB-FM Albuquerque (Talk)
- 96.7 KSFE Grants (Classic hits)
- 97.3 KKSS Santa Fe (Rhythmic contemporary)
- 97.7 KLVO Belen (Regional Mexican)
- 98.5 KABG Los Alamos (Classic hits)
- 99.5 KMGA Albuquerque (Adult contemporary)
- 99.9 KMGG-LP Albuquerque (LPFM/urban contemporary)*
- 100.3 KPEK Albuquerque (Hot AC)
- 101.3 KYLZ Albuquerque (Hip-Hop)
- 101.7 KQTM Rio Rancho (Sports)
- 102.1 KQUQ-LP Albuquerque (LPFM/variety)*
- 102.5 KIOT Los Lunas (Classic rock)
- 103.3 KDRF Albuquerque (Adult hits)
- 104.1 KTEG Santa Fe (Modern rock)
- 104.7 KNFZ Bosque Farms (Spanish Christian)
- 105.1 KKRG Santa Fe (Hot AC)
- 105.5 KQRI Bosque Farms (Air1)*
- 105.9 KRZY Santa Fe (Grupero/Cumbia)
- 106.3 KXOT Los Lunas (Regional Mexican)
- 106.7 KVCN Los Alamos (VCY America)*
- 107.1 KYFV Armijo (Bible Broadcasting Network)*
- 107.9 KBQI Albuquerque (Country)

== Defunct publications ==
- Albuquerque Tribune: (1922-2008) An afternoon general newspaper, and former competitor to the Albuquerque Journal.
- Bosque Beast: (2012-2016) Covered animals and pet owners; published six times a year; free to every residence and business in Corrales; delivered free to pick up locations around Albuquerque and Sandoval County.
- Local iQ: (2006-2014) Albuquerque lifestyle magazine; contains hyper-local information including arts and entertainment, food, wine, music, film, books, theater, travel, comedy, retail and art, among many other topics; printed bi-weekly; free on the stands.
- Weekly Alibi: (1992-2020) an alternative weekly newspaper published in Albuquerque, featuring news, film, music, art, food, entertainment, blogs, personals and event calendars.
