= KRKE =

KRKE may refer to:

- KRKE (AM), a radio station (1100 AM) licensed to serve Peralta, New Mexico, United States
- KYLZ (FM), a radio station (101.3 FM) licensed to serve Albuquerque, New Mexico, which held the call sign KRKE-FM from 2017 to 2022
- KEMR (AM), a radio station (1090 AM) licensed to serve Milan, New Mexico, which held the call sign KRKE from 2002 to 2005 and 2015 to 2017
- KQNM, a radio station (1550 AM) licensed to serve Albuquerque, New Mexico, which held the call sign KRKE from 2012 to 2015
- KIVA (AM), a radio station (1600 AM) licensed to serve Albuquerque, New Mexico, which held the call sign KRKE from 2005 to 2012
- KZRR, a radio station (94.1 FM) licensed to serve Albuquerque, New Mexico, which held the call sign KRKE-FM from 1985 to 1986
- KNML, a radio station (610 AM) licensed to serve Albuquerque, New Mexico, which held the call sign KRKE from 1973 to 1986
