= KSFE =

KSFE may refer to:

- Kerala State Financial Enterprises
- KSFE (FM), a radio station (96.7 FM) licensed to serve Grants, New Mexico, United States
- KEMR (AM), a radio station (1090 AM) licensed to serve Milan, New Mexico, United States, which held the call sign KSFE from 2017 to 2019
- KYLZ (FM), a radio station (101.3 FM) licensed to serve Albuquerque, New Mexico, United States, which held the call sign KSFE-FM in October 2017
- KJFA-FM, a radio station (102.9 FM) licensed to serve Pecos, New Mexico, United States, which held the call signs KSFE and KSFE-FM from 2015 to 2017
- KMBH-LD, a television station (channel 20/PSIP 67) licensed to serve McAllen, Texas, United States, which held the call signs KSFE-LP and KSFE-LD from 2000 to 2012
- KTOX, a radio station (1340 AM) licensed to serve Needles, California, United States, which held the call sign KSFE from 1952 to 1991
