= KQLV =

KQLV may refer to:

- KQLV (FM), a radio station (90.7 FM) licensed to serve Santa Fe, New Mexico, United States
- KQRI, a radio station (105.5 FM) licensed to serve Bosque Farms, New Mexico, which held the call sign KQLV from June 1998 to May 2009
