= KABR =

KABR may refer to:

- KABR (FM), a radio station (107.5 FM) licensed to serve Alamo Community, New Mexico, United States
- KYGR, a defunct radio station (88.1 FM) formerly licensed to serve Alamo, New Mexico, which held the call sign KABR-FM from 2009 to 2012
- 1500 KOAZ Alamo Community, New Mexico — an Alamo Navajo station on the air since 1982 and known as KABR until 2010
- KABR (defunct) Aberdeen, South Dakota — a station on the air at least from the 1940s to the 1970s; it resided on 1420 kHz and is now known as KGIM (AM)
- The ICAO airport code for Aberdeen Regional Airport in South Dakota
