= KNKT =

KNKT may refer to:

- KNKT (FM), a radio station (90.7 FM) licensed to serve Cannon Air Force Base, New Mexico, United States
- KYFV, a radio station (107.1 FM) licensed to serve Armijo, New Mexico, which held the call sign KNKT from 1994 to 2021
- Marine Corps Air Station Cherry Point (ICAO code KNKT)
- National Transportation Safety Committee (KNKT is short for the Indonesian name, Komite Nasional Keselamatan Transportasi)
