= KKJY =

KKJY may refer to:

- KSSR-FM, a radio station (95.9 FM) licensed to Santa Rosa, New Mexico, United States, which held the call sign KKJY from March 2009 to July 2010
- KQNM, a radio station (1550 AM) licensed to Albuquerque, New Mexico, which held the call sign KKJY from February 2000 to July 2008
- KEMR (AM), a radio station (1090 AM) licensed to Milan, New Mexico, which held the call sign KKJY from July 2008 to March 2009
- KPEK, a radio station (100.3 FM) licensed to Albuquerque, New Mexico, which held the call sign KKJY from 1980 to 1994
