= KDSK =

KDSK can refer to:

- KDSK (AM), a radio station at 1240 AM located in Albuquerque, New Mexico
- KDSK-FM, a radio station at 92.7 FM located in Grants, New Mexico
