= KMYN =

KMYN may refer to:

- KMYN-LD, a low-power television station (channel 32) licensed to serve Duluth, Minnesota, United States; see List of television stations in Minnesota
- KSFE (FM), a radio station (96.7 FM) licensed to serve Grants, New Mexico, United States, which held the call sign KMYN from 2012 to 2019
- KOAZ, a radio station (1510 AM) licensed to serve Isleta, New Mexico, which held the call sign KMYN from 2010 to 2011
