= KQLV/KQRI =

KQLV/KQRI may refer to:

- KQRI, a radio station (105.5 FM) licensed to serve Bosque Farms, New Mexico, United States, which held the call sign KQLV from June 1998 to May 2009
- KQGC, a defunct radio station (91.1 FM) formerly licensed to serve Belen, New Mexico, which held the call sign KQRI from June 2006 to May 2009
