= 1310 AM =

AM radio frequency

The following radio stations broadcast on AM frequency 1310 kHz: The Federal Communications Commission classifies 1310 AM as a regional frequency.

== In Argentina ==
- LRA42 in Gualeguaychú, Entre Ríos.
- LRG379 in Piedra del Aguila, Neuquén.
- Master in Luján.

== In Canada ==
- CIWW in Ottawa, Ontario - 50 kW, transmitter located at 45.257528°N 75.784222°W (defunct) CIWW turned off its transmitter on October 27, 2023

== In Mexico ==
- XEAM-AM in Matamoros, Tamaulipas
- XEC-AM in Tijuana, Baja California
- XEGRT-AM in Taxco, Guerrero
- XERAM-AM in Betania, Chiapas
- XETIA-AM in Guadalajara, Jalisco
- XEVB-AM in Monterrey, Nuevo León
- XEQRMD-AM in Querétaro, Querétaro

== In the United States ==
| Call sign | City of license | Facility ID | Class | Daytime power (kW) | Nighttime power (kW) | Transmitter coordinates |
|---|---|---|---|---|---|---|
| KAHL | San Antonio, Texas | 67070 | D | 5 | 0.236 | 29.414722°N 98.343333°W |
| KDLS | Perry, Iowa | 52314 | B | 0.5 | 0.3 | 41.832778°N 94.0375°W |
| KEIN | Great Falls, Montana | 56664 | B | 5 | 1 | 47.522222°N 111.388333°W |
| KFKA | Greeley, Colorado | 71443 | B | 5 | 1 | 40.365556°N 104.732222°W |
| KGLB | Glencoe, Minnesota | 31874 | B | 2.5 | 0.27 | 44.778056°N 94.127778°W |
| KGMT | Fairbury, Nebraska | 60292 | D | 0.5 | 0.095 | 40.116111°N 97.151389°W |
| KIHP | Mesa, Arizona | 19468 | B | 3.4 | 0.26 | 33.361944°N 111.9675°W |
| KKNS | Corrales, New Mexico | 7050 | D | 5 | 0.082 | 35.132222°N 106.621667°W |
| KKZI | Barstow, California | 60423 | D | 1 | 0.08 | 34.914444°N 117.0175°W |
| KLIX | Twin Falls, Idaho | 3404 | B | 5 | 2.5 | 42.551667°N 114.3675°W |
| KMKY | Oakland, California | 96 | B | 5 | 5 | 37.824167°N 122.319444°W |
| KNOX | Grand Forks, North Dakota | 54592 | B | 5 | 5 | 47.844167°N 97.025°W |
| KOKX | Keokuk, Iowa | 58264 | B | 1 | 0.5 | 40.380556°N 91.3525°W |
| KTCK | Dallas, Texas | 8773 | B | 25 | 5 | 32.944722°N 96.940278°W |
| KYUL | Scott City, Kansas | 71854 | D | 0.5 | 0.147 | 38.526389°N 100.911667°W |
| KZIP | Amarillo, Texas | 16415 | D | 1 | 0.088 | 35.183889°N 101.969722°W |
| KZRG | Joplin, Missouri | 71605 | B | 5 | 1 | 37.1175°N 94.544722°W |
| KZXR | Prosser, Washington | 53675 | D | 5 | 0.066 | 46.234167°N 119.813611°W |
| KZYP | Malvern, Arkansas | 39750 | D | 1 | | 34.373611°N 92.83°W |
| WAFN | Priceville, Alabama | 290 | D | 1 | 0.033 | 34.540278°N 86.904167°W |
| WAUC | Wauchula, Florida | 40387 | B | 5 | 0.5 | 27.53°N 81.818889°W |
| WBFD | Bedford, Pennsylvania | 10071 | D | 1 | 0.085 | 40.043611°N 78.503056°W |
| WCCW | Traverse City, Michigan | 20421 | B | 15 | | 44.677222°N 85.665556°W |
| WDCT | Fairfax, Virginia | 20668 | B | 5 | 0.5 | 38.852222°N 77.315833°W |
| WDOC | Prestonsburg, Kentucky | 71348 | D | 5 | 0.025 | 37.695833°N 82.756667°W |
| WDPN | Alliance, Ohio | 14913 | B | 1 | 0.48 | 40.926111°N 81.128056°W |
| WDTW | Dearborn, Michigan | 6593 | B | 5 | 5 | 42.263889°N 83.254444°W |
| WDXI | Jackson, Tennessee | 37244 | D | 5 | 0.05 | 35.663889°N 88.822222°W |
| WEMG | Camden, New Jersey | 74073 | B | 1 | 0.25 | 39.957778°N 75.115°W |
| WGH | Newport News, Virginia | 72103 | B | 20 | 5 | 37.045278°N 76.448333°W |
| WGSP | Charlotte, North Carolina | 10631 | D | 5 | 0.24 | 35.256389°N 80.864444°W |
| WHEP | Foley, Alabama | 63429 | D | 2.5 | 0.043 | 30.443889°N 87.681111°W |
| WIBA | Madison, Wisconsin | 17384 | B | 5 | 5 | 42.999444°N 89.429722°W |
| WICH | Norwich, Connecticut | 72347 | B | 5 | 5 | 41.552778°N 72.076111°W |
| WICU | Warren, Pennsylvania | 34928 | D | 5 | 0.094 | 41.813889°N 79.167778°W |
| WISE | Asheville, North Carolina | 68835 | B | 5 | 1 | 35.619167°N 82.5725°W |
| WJUS | Marion, Alabama | 57472 | D | 5 | 0.033 | 32.635833°N 87.302222°W |
| WLOB | Portland, Maine | 9202 | B | 5 | 5 | 43.689444°N 70.334722°W |
| WOBM | Asbury Park, New Jersey | 14895 | B | 2.5 | 1 | 40.229722°N 74.090833°W |
| WOKA | Douglas, Georgia | 12202 | D | 0.5 | 0.068 | 31.523333°N 82.872778°W |
| WOKR | Canandaigua, New York | 88676 | B | 1 | 1 | 42.888889°N 77.319167°W |
| WORC | Worcester, Massachusetts | 15858 | B | 5 | 1 | 42.221944°N 71.817222°W |
| WPCH | West Point, Georgia | 54864 | D | 1 | 0.025 | 32.896667°N 85.156667°W |
| WRVP | Mount Kisco, New York | 70273 | D | 5 | 0.033 | 41.193611°N 73.739444°W |
| WSLW | White Sulphur Springs, West Virginia | 59678 | D | 5 | | 37.804722°N 80.350833°W |
| WTIK | Durham, North Carolina | 53105 | B | 5 | 1 | 36.025°N 78.902222°W |
| WTLB | Utica, New York | 54548 | B | 5 | 0.5 | 43.056667°N 75.278333°W |
| WTLC | Indianapolis, Indiana | 51433 | B | 5 | 1 | 39.718889°N 86.175833°W |
| WTTL | Madisonville, Kentucky | 13799 | D | 1 | 0.04 | 37.336667°N 87.544722°W |
| WTZN | Troy, Pennsylvania | 8551 | D | 1 | 0.072 | 41.780833°N 76.819167°W |
| WWWE | Decatur, Georgia | 36144 | D | 2.5 | 0.031 | 33.772778°N 84.281944°W |
| WXMC | Parsippany-Troy Hills, New Jersey | 29957 | D | 1 | 0.088 | 40.864167°N 74.351667°W |
| WYND | DeLand, Florida | 7741 | D | 10.4 | 0.115 | 28.999167°N 81.298333°W |
