= KRKE (AM) =

- Peralta, New Mexico; United States
- Broadcast area: Albuquerque, New Mexico
- Frequency: 1100 kHz
- Branding: The Eighties Channel

Programming
- Format: 1980s hits
- Affiliations: Premiere Networks

Ownership
- Owner: Don Davis
- Sister stations: KEMR, KOAZ, KSFE, KXOT, KYLZ

History
- First air date: 2022
- Former call signs: KVVD (2021–2022)
- Call sign meaning: Albuquerque

Technical information
- Licensing authority: FCC
- Facility ID: 160574
- Class: D
- Power: 1,000 watts day
- Translator: 93.7 K229CL (Albuquerque)

Links
- Public license information: Public file; LMS
- Webcast: Listen Live
- Website: kmrichards.com/KRKE/

KRKE (1100 kHz) is an AM radio station licensed to Peralta, New Mexico, serving the Albuquerque radio market. The station also feeds FM translator K229CL on 93.7 FM. The station airs a 1980s hits format. The new format launched at noon on Friday October 14, 2022.

== History ==
The earliest record for an original construction permit was filed on February 2, 2004, by Bret D. Huggins to broadcast a 50 kW daytime signal on 1120 kHz. However, it was not granted until November 30, 2018. Huggins then sold the permit to Vanguard Media owner Don Davis for $25,000 in June 2020. On March 15, 2021, it was assigned call letters KVVD. In September 2021 a modification was filed to move the broadcast to 1100 kHz at 1000 watts daytime only. It was licensed on February 28, 2022.

=== K229CL 93.7 ===
An original construction permit was granted on October 23, 2013. It was licensed to Telebeeper of New Mexico and signed on with 40 watts ERP in summer 2014 with the license granted on August 8. On March 30, 2015, it was licensed to broadcast at the full 250 watts allowed for translators. KDSK was the primary station until that station's owners (KD Radio) moved their own FM translator out of Grants, New Mexico to Albuquerque at 92.9 K225CH in Fall 2016. In Spring 2017, KIVA 1600 began a rebroadcast on the translator until the end of 2020. after which K229CL was silent until returning in late December 2021 simulcasting the Regional Mexican programming from KDLW (now KXOT) 106.3. On September 29, 2022, the primary station was changed to KRKE 1100 AM. On October 10, 2022, both stations began stunting with a 10-minute loop of remixed clips of 80s hits. On October 14, 2022, at noon, KRKE/K229CL launched an all-80's hits format as "The Eighties Channel", which was previously heard on the former KRKE (now KQNM) on 1550 AM and its then-associated translator K233CG at 94.5 FM from May 2014 to September 2015. In early 2023, Don Davis purchased K229CL for $20,000 from the estate of Phillip D. Vanderhoof (Telebeeper's owner until his death) to ensure KRKE's FM broadcast. It was consummated on May 15, 2023.
