= KQRI =

Coordinates: 34.7987°N 106.8170°W

- Bosque Farms, New Mexico; United States
- Broadcast area: Albuquerque metropolitan area and Central New Mexico
- Frequency: 105.5 MHz
- Branding: Air1

Programming
- Format: Christian worship
- Affiliations: Air1

Ownership
- Owner: Educational Media Foundation
- Sister stations: KQLV, KQGC

History
- First air date: 2004
- Former call signs: KQLV (1998–2009)

Technical information
- Licensing authority: FCC
- Facility ID: 84247
- Class: C1
- ERP: 100,000 watts
- HAAT: 227 meters (745 ft)

Links
- Public license information: Public file; LMS
- Webcast: Listen Live
- Website: air1.com

KQRI (105.5 FM) is a non-commercial radio station licensed to Bosque Farms, New Mexico. It covers the Albuquerque metropolitan area and Valencia County. It is owned by the Educational Media Foundation broadcasting its "Air1" Christian worship music service, a national radio format.

== History ==
KQRI is one of the newest additions to the Albuquerque radio market, having moved into the area in 2004 from Grants, New Mexico. The 105.5 frequency in Albuquerque was previously translator K288CX, which had re-broadcast the programming on various stations in the Albuquerque and Santa Fe market over the years. In 2015, more than decade after being displaced, the translator moved to 107.5 as K298BY rebroadcasting KIVA 1600. In 2012, KQRI-FM1, a 16,000 watt effective radiated power booster on 105.5 in Albuquerque came on the air.

105.5 was originally KQLV and had aired EMF's "K-Love" format. In the spring of 2009, KQLV had moved to the recently upgraded facility at 90.7 FM Santa Fe. KQRI and the "Air 1" format had previously aired on 90.7 in Belen, which had moved to 91.1 to make way for the Santa Fe station on 90.7. KQRI moved to 105.5 in June 2009 while 91.1 became KQGC airing a Christian country music format. Since this change, KQRI is now vying for area listeners with locally programmed heritage station KLYT previously known as "M88". That station, however, had rebranded as "Static Radio" in 2011 playing Christian rock bands alongside some selected secular alternative rock songs. In April 2015 it rebranded again as "Star 88".

On December 1, 2015, KQRI had been rebroadcasting on translator K233CG 94.5 in Albuquerque. The EMF owned translator had previously been leased since 2011 to KRKE 1550 (now KQNM) which aired an 80's hits format until late September 2015. KQRI had previously used the translator from 2009-2011 when it broadcast at 89.5 as K208EO although it did not really provide any additional coverage for KQRI. In late June 2016 EMF sold the translator to Martha Whitman for $61,432.66. Martha Whitman is the owner of KOAZ 1510 AM and translator K279BP which rebroadcasts KOAZ. The sale was consummated on August 15, 2016 at which time the broadcast on 94.5 ceased. The translator now airs programming from KKOB (AM).

== KDRI ==
This format has also aired on KDRI out of Grants, New Mexico on 90.3 FM, which can sometimes be picked up in Albuquerque on some radios (usually in cars) although not so much since KANW upgraded K212AN in Santa Fe in late 2015. This station was previously KLGQ from 2005 until August 15, 2012 when it changed to KDRI. The station broadcasts at 1,000 watts. On June 13, 2016, this station went silent as EMF prepared to sell the station. On September 12, 2016, the station was donated along with KGGA 88.1 in Gallup to the Board of Education of the City of Albuquerque which operates public radio station KANW. KANW already owns KIDS 88.1 in Grants so KDRI would become a second station in the area.
