= KKIM =

KKIM may refer to:

- KKIM (AM), a radio station (1000 AM) licensed to Albuquerque, New Mexico, United States
- KLBU, a radio station (94.7 FM) licensed to Santa Fe, New Mexico, which held the call sign KKIM-FM from 2007 to 2015
