= KXKS =

KXKS may refer to:

- KXKS (AM), a radio station (1190 AM) licensed to Albuquerque, New Mexico, United States
- KXKS-FM, a radio station (93.7 FM) licensed to Shreveport, Louisiana, United States
