= WDLF =

WDLF may refer to:

- White dwarf luminosity function
- WDLF-LD, a defunct low-power television station (channel 14) formerly licensed to serve Peoria, Illinois, United States
- WQNQ, a radio station (104.3 FM) licensed to Fletcher, North Carolina, United States, which used the call sign WDLF from January 1991 to November 1996
- WYLV, a radio station (88.3 FM) licensed to Maynardville, Tennessee, United States which used the call sign WDLF from June 2008 to January 2011
- WYND (AM), a radio station (1310 AM) licensed to DeLand, Florida, United States, which used the call sign WDLF from December 1980 to April 1984
