= KARA (New Mexico) =

Radio station in Albuquerque, New Mexico (1959–1968)

- Albuquerque, New Mexico; United States
- Frequency: 1310 kHz

Ownership
- Owner: KARA, Inc.

History
- First air date: December 1, 1959
- Last air date: May 18, 1968
- Call sign meaning: Keeping Albuquerque Radio Active

Technical information
- Power: 1,000 watts day

KARA was a radio station on 1310 AM in Albuquerque, New Mexico, United States. The station operated from December 1, 1959, to May 18, 1968. Over much of its history, KARA encountered financial difficulties, which ultimately forced the station to cease operations and declare bankruptcy.

== History ==
KARA began broadcasting December 1, 1959. It was originally owned by KARA, Inc., and became Albuquerque's ABC Radio affiliate. It was the tenth radio station in town, operating a continuous music format; launch promotions stated that the station was "Keeping Albuquerque Radio Active". The ownership, which had acquired the construction permit for $15,000 before sign-on, was headed by Nicholas White and John Gallagher. White sold his stock to Gallagher the next year. Later in 1960, KARA joined the fray as several applicants sought to build a station at 860 kHz, with KARA proposing to relocate its station from 1310 while keeping its power at 1,000 watts; three months later, the station opted to withdraw its application.

KARA joined the ABC Radio network in March 1961, but it was one of 36 outlets whose affiliation was terminated over the course of 1962. November 11, 1963, saw the launch of an FM counterpart, KARA-FM 99.5; the two stations simulcast a beautiful music format during the day, while the new FM outlet continued it after sunset.

By 1965, however, KARA was beginning to experience financial difficulties that would ultimately silence the station for good. The first sign of trouble came that year, when the FM station was sold off to four Albuquerque men for $22,500; station president Charles S. Gerber noted that the sale would allow him to further reduce KARA's indebtedness, which had already been diminished from a peak of $140,000 in 1963. At the time of the sale, it was announced that the AM and FM would continue to simulcast; however, FCC rules required that the FM station select new call letters, so KARA-FM became KBNM-FM in March 1966. Later that year, KARA began programming a Spanish-language format, promoting itself as "The Modern Sound in Spanish Music".

Former general manager Gerber sued KARA, Inc., in August 1967. He charged that owner Gallagher had breached a March 1966 contract by which he was to sell his shares in the company for $30,000; Gerber claimed to only have received $7,500. In addition, according to the lawsuit, KARA ownership was siphoning off assets and profit into a bank account and not paying creditors. Creditors that sought and obtained judgments against the radio stations in late 1967 included the Albuquerque law firm of Franks and deVesty, which received $6,000, and Broadcast Music, Inc., which won more than $1,000. Alongside the money woes came a lawsuit from Star Broadcasting, the owners of KBNM-FM, claiming that KARA would not allow any mail labeled "KARA-FM" to be delivered to their station. Three creditors then filed a petition for bankruptcy reorganization of the company in January 1968, with owner Gallagher claiming to be owed $275,000; the creditors claimed the station was insolvent and asked for the appointment of a trustee.

KARA ceased broadcasting on May 18, 1968; the Federal Communications Commission dismissed the station's license renewal application that November, and the license was deleted on December 20, 1968. Even after going silent, KARA faced legal actions for debts it owed to creditors, including the United Press International wire service, which sought a judgment of more than $22,000 against the station in August. Office equipment and more than 570 records from the station's studios were put up for public auction by the federal government in May 1969. The 1310 kHz frequency would not be occupied in Albuquerque again until 1985, when religious outlet KXAK began broadcasting.
