= XERAM-AM =

Radio station in Betania, Chiapas

- Betania, Chiapas, Mexico; Mexico
- Broadcast area: Betania, Chiapas
- Frequency: 1310 kHz

Ownership
- Owner: La Fuente de Poder, Educativa Indígena de Chiapas, A.C.

History
- First air date: April 27, 2016 (social concession award)

Technical information
- Power: 1 kW
- Transmitter coordinates: 16°36′49.9″N 92°32′31.6″W

XERAM-AM is a radio station on 1310 AM in Betania, Chiapas, Mexico. It is owned by La Fuente de Poder, Educativa Indígena de Chiapas, A.C.

XERAM was awarded its concession on April 27, 2016, more than a decade after the original request.
