= Albuquerque the Magazine =

American Magzine

Albuquerque The Magazine
- Categories: Regional
- Frequency: Monthly
- Circulation: 85,000
- Publisher: Larryl Lynch
- First issue: May 2004
- Country: United States
- Based in: Albuquerque, New Mexico
- Language: English
- Website: abqthemag.com
- OCLC: 71361898

Albuquerque The Magazine is a monthly American magazine published in Albuquerque, New Mexico. Founded in 2004, most of the magazine's staff is native to New Mexico and they chronicle the culture and life of the city. Advertisements for the magazine often finish with the line "We love it here."

People associated with Albuquerque are prominently featured, including celebrities such as Bob Odenkirk and local politicians like Richard J. Berry.

== Best of the City ==
An annual issue, called the "Best of the City", is regarded as the most read of the year. During this time It features the best of everything in the city as voted upon by readers. Categories include "best restaurant" to "best place to propose," and a new one is usually added every year. The award has included several noteworthy recipients, including restaurants like Sadie's and Twisters.

== See also ==
- Media in Albuquerque, New Mexico
