= KXOT (FM) =

Radio station in Los Lunas–Albuquerque, New Mexico

- Los Lunas, New Mexico; United States
- Broadcast area: Albuquerque metropolitan area
- Frequency: 106.3 MHz
- Branding: La Mexicana 106.3

Programming
- Format: Regional Mexican

Ownership
- Owner: Don Davis; (Vanguard, LLC)
- Sister stations: KOAZ, KRKE, KSFE, KYLZ

History
- First air date: January 1995
- Former call signs: KZPY (1990–1995); KDNR (1995–1997); KYLZ (1997–2005); KAGM (2005–2013); KDLW (2013–2022)
- Call sign meaning: Exitos (Hits)

Technical information
- Licensing authority: FCC
- Facility ID: 51762
- Class: C1
- ERP: 100,000 watts
- HAAT: 261 meters (856 ft)
- Transmitter coordinates: 34.799°N 106.817°W
- Translator: 95.9 K240EC (Santa Fe)

Links
- Public license information: Public file; LMS
- Webcast: Listen live

KXOT (106.3 FM) is a commercial radio station licensed to Los Lunas, New Mexico, United States, and serving the Albuquerque metropolitan area. Owned by Vanguard Media, it airs a regional Mexican format branded as "La Mexicana 106.3", with studios on San Pedro Drive NE at Marble Avenue in Albuquerque.

KXOT's transmitter is sited off of Tower Road in Los Lunas. Programming is also heard on low-power FM translator K240EC at 95.9 MHz in Santa Fe.

== History ==
=== Construction ===
An original construction permit was granted by the Federal Communications Commission (FCC) in September 1990. While it was being built, the call sign was KZPY. It was licensed to Patricia Komorowski, and would be launched by Guardian Communications under a local marketing agreement (LMA) in January 1995. That was coupled with a signal upgrade for 97.7 KLVO. Two months later, Guardian would purchase the station for $210,000.

Prior to the construction of this facility, the 106.3 frequency in Albuquerque was used by FM translator K292EN, which was owned by Double Eagle Broadcasting of Cordova, Tennessee. which had initially aired KMXQ in Socorro; The 106.3 translator had been simulcasting KZRQ 105.1 FM, which was an affiliate of the "Z-Rock" radio network at the time, playing active rock.

=== Rhythm Driven 106-3 ===
KZPY 106.3 signed on the air in January 1995. It had a "Dance and Romance" format. It later used KDNR as its call letters, representing the slogan "Dance and Romance." The format later switched to rhythmic contemporary, branded as "Rhythm Driven 106-3."

In September 1996, Guardian Communications of Cincinnati announced the sale of its stations, including the Albuquerque cluster of KDNR, KLVO, KKIM 1000 AM and KARS 840 AM. The stations were sold to American General Media for $5.5 million in early 1998, shortly after FM 106.3 shifted to Rhythmic Contemporary music.

=== Wild 106 ===
In the summer of 1997, the station switched its call sign to KYLZ-FM, which was previously used by KSQL in Santa Cruz, California from 1994 to 1996. FM 106.3 used the same moniker and Rhythmic Contemporary format as "Wild 107-7" in Santa Cruz. However, there is no evidence that there was ever any connection between the two stations. The new station was branded as "Wild 106", and went head-to-head with Rhythmic KKSS 97.3 FM. KKSS had been very popular with local youth for much of the 1990s.

The two stations were in a fierce battle for Albuquerque's hip-hop music listeners over the next seven years. KKSS shifted to mainstream Top 40 hits in early 2001, making KYLZ 106.3 the lone rhythmic contemporary station for nearly two years. However, KKSS returned to rhythmic in late 2002 after changing ownership, putting the two stations in direct competition once again. KKSS eventually reclaimed the top spot in the format.

=== Talk FM ===
In late 2004, American General Media decided to challenge Albuquerque's top-rated station, KKOB 770 AM, a talk radio outlet owned by Cumulus Media. This was after popular KKOB morning host Larry Ahrens had signed with American General and left 770 AM. KYLZ-FM was selected as the station to flip to a new FM talk format. "Wild 106" came to an end in February 2005. The following month, KYLZ-FM officially switched to the new talk format under the call letters KAGM (standing for parent company American General Media).

("Wild" was revived in December 2007 as KDLW on 97.7 FM, but had not been an effective competitor with KKSS as KYLZ was. After KAGM launched a new hip-hop format in July 2009, Wild 97.7 became known as "OMG! Radio" on August 24, 2009, with a mainstream top 40 format.)

In addition to Ahrens, other local hosts featured on KAGM included Dianne Anderson, who had just left her TV news anchor job at KOAT. She hosted an afternoon talk show on KAGM, later joined by her husband Mark Mathis. Late afternoon drive time featured Chris Jackson, who was KKOB's afternoon host during the late 1990s, and Phil "The Bean" Sisneros, formerly the longtime morning show host on KKOB-FM until late 2002. Nationally syndicated talk radio hosts Glenn Beck and Rusty Humphries originally filled the midday and nighttime slots.

The station had numerous line-up changes during its run. The station achieved low Arbitron ratings after several months. It appeared to have little or no impact on KKOB's popularity. In 2006, Jackson and Sisneros were let go and replaced with a couple of previously unknown hosts. Dianne Anderson joined Larry Ahrens in morning drive, but later returned to television, taking a new anchor job at KRQE. The talk format ended on September 29, 2006, and was replaced with a temporary simulcast of sister station KZNM's Spanish-language oldies format.

=== The Range ===
KAGM flipped to classic country on October 4, 2006. It was known as "The Range". That branding was formerly on two other area stations under the KKRG-FM call letters: on 101.3 FM from December 2001 until November 2002, and on 105.1 FM from April 2004 until March 2006.

The Range classic country music continued for about three years.

=== Power 106 ===
On July 20, 2009, at 1:06 p.m., KAGM flipped formats to Rhythmic Contemporary and adopted the "Power 106" moniker. With this move, AGM had two Rhythmic outlets in the same radio market, the other being KDLW 97.7 FM. This arrangement temporarily lasted several weeks. On August 24, KAGM switched directions to Mainstream Top 40-CHR. That continued for about a year.

In late 2010, "Power" began to mix current rhythmic hits with old-school hip hop/R&B using a new slogan "Today and Back in the Day". Mornings originally featured the syndicated Big Boy's Neighborhood from Los Angeles. However, in October 2011, KAGM replaced Big Boy with local host Double J, taking over the morning show. By July 2012, "Power" has begun to mix more urban contemporary material into the playlist.

On March 28, 2013, it was announced that "Power" was moving to 106.7 FM at 8 a.m. on April 1. The station wanted to take advantage of a stronger signal. With the switch, the station was rebranded as "Power 106.7".

=== Z106.3 ===
At the same time as the move of "Power" to 106.7 FM, 106.3 FM took over KDLW's Top 40/CHR format and relaunched it as "Z106.3, Hit Music Now." (However, despite a banner on its webpage leading up to the switchover, KDLW did not do any announcements or promotions towards the flip. In the hours before, the station ran with no DJs.)

On April 4, 2013, KAGM and KDLW swapped call letters. For three months after the launch, the station had no social media presence and its webpage only featured a white background with standard lettering plus a link to its web stream. In addition, the station continued to run sweepers telling "Power" listeners to tune in to 106.7 FM for many months. By early July 2013, it had updated its webpage and revived the "OMG! Radio" Facebook page with the updated logo.

The "Z" format was a successor to the former "OMG! Radio" that aired from 2009 to 2011 on 97.7 FM and on 106.7 FM from 2011 to 2013. The "OMG!" airstaff, however, was not moved to the new station, which had been running automated for the first year. It later added personalities which included Ashley V (later at KKSS), Rico Rich and k-dawg (later at KOBQ). In February 2016, the syndicated Johnjay & Rich morning show was added from Phoenix.

=== Changes in ownership ===
On June 14, 2017, AGM announced that it would acquire Univision's entire Albuquerque cluster. Those stations included rival KKSS, as well as KKRG and KIOT. To meet ownership limits set by the FCC, AGM would spin off KDLW to BB Broadcasting. That company was owned by real estate developer Tom Buzzuto. The price tag was $750,000.

Following acquisition, the station would be programmed by Vanguard Media, owners of Smooth Jazz station KOAZ and newly acquired KJFA-FM. A time brokerage agreement was worked out until . The sale was consummated on September 1, 2017.

On April 29, 2019, Vanguard Media turned the time brokerage agreement into a purchase of the station for $850,000. The purchase was consummated on June 25, 2019.

=== Regional Mexican formats ===
On May 4, 2020, KDLW dropped the Top 40/CHR format and began stunting with sweepers coinciding with Cinco de Mayo. The next day, KDLW flipped to Regional Mexican, branded as "La Zeta 106.3". The station focused on being "100% local", while featuring a variety of Regional Mexican music genres.

On September 1, 2020, KDLW expanded its broadcast to KSFE (96.7 FM) in Grants and translator K240EC (95.9 FM) in Santa Fe, replacing the smooth jazz format heard on KOAZ.

On January 3, 2022, KDLW rebranded as "Exitos 106.3", described as "Regional Mexican CHR". The simulcast on KSFE was also discontinued. Rebroadcasts were also aired on KVVD 1100 AM (now KRKE) and translator K229CL 93.7 until October 10, 2022.

On August 23, 2022, the station changed the call letters to KXOT. Shortly after the station rebranded again as "La Mexicana 106.3".

== Former logos ==
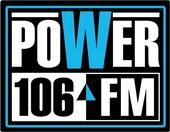
