= Netflix Albuquerque Studios =

Netflix Studios - Albuquerque, New Mexico
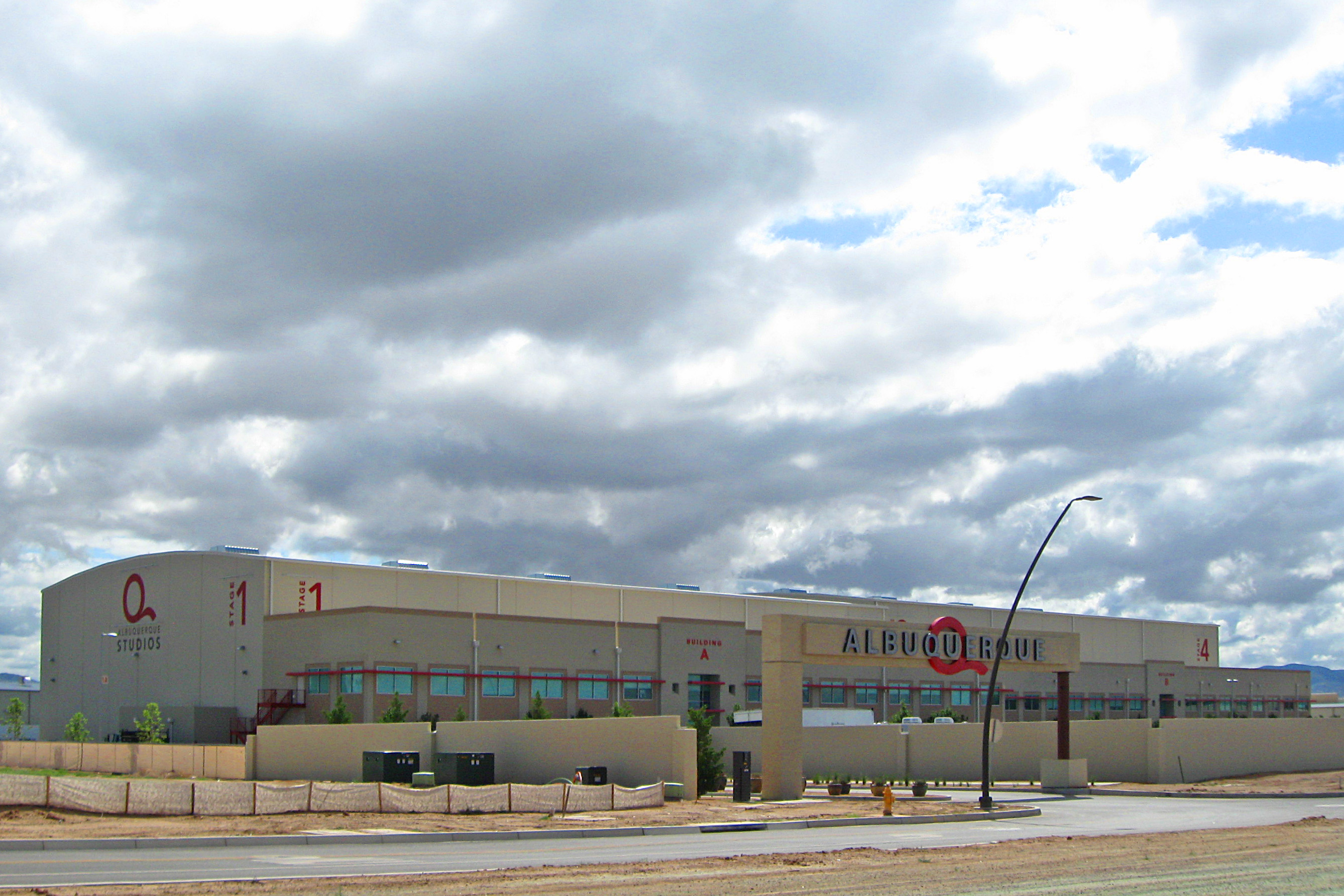
- Netflix Studios - Albuquerque, a movie studio located at 5650 University Boulevard SE in Albuquerque, New Mexico.
- Former names: Albuquerque Studios
- Alternative names: ABQ Studios

General information
- Type: Film and Television Studios
- Location: Mesa del Sol, Albuquerque, New Mexico, United States
- Coordinates: 34°59′12″N 106°36′31″W
- Completed: 2007
- Owner: Netflix

Website
- netflixinyourneighborhoodnm.com

Netflix Studios - Albuquerque, New Mexico is a film studio located in the Mesa del Sol development of Albuquerque, New Mexico. The premises include twelve sound stages, production offices, and a backlot.

Originally known as ABQ Studios, the facility served as headquarters for the Breaking Bad television show crew, as well as for a number of Hollywood films. Breaking Bad was the second production to be filmed at the studio, after In Plain Sight. The coordinates at which Breaking Bad character Walter White buries his money in the season 5 episode "Buried"—34°59′12″N 106°36′31″W—actually points to Albuquerque Studios.

In October 2018, it was announced that Netflix was in negotiations to buy the studio and make it the primary production facility for Netflix Originals. The company acquired the facility with a $30 million capital investment, and received an additional $14.5 million in funding through the city of Albuquerque and the state of New Mexico. The studio, originally built in 2007 with a budget of around $91 million, was renamed following the acquisition.

In November 2020, Netflix announced that the facility will be expanded by 300 acres (120 ha) with $1 billion committed towards spending for production. Construction for the expansion commenced in May 2022 and is expected to be completed by 2024.

Notable productions at the studios have included:

- Breaking Bad (2008–2013)
- The Book of Eli (2010)
- The Avengers (2012)
- The Lone Ranger (2013)
- Better Call Saul (2015–2022)
- Maze Runner: The Scorch Trials (2015)
- Independence Day: Resurgence (2016)
- Just Getting Started (2017)
- Logan (2017)
- El Camino: A Breaking Bad Movie (2019)
- Stranger Things season 4 (2022)
- Ransom Canyon (season 1; 2025)

== See also ==
- Media in Albuquerque, New Mexico
