= Mesa del Sol =

Subdivision in Albuquerque, New Mexico

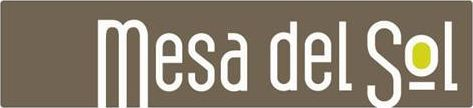
Mesa del Sol
- Subdivision of Albuquerque
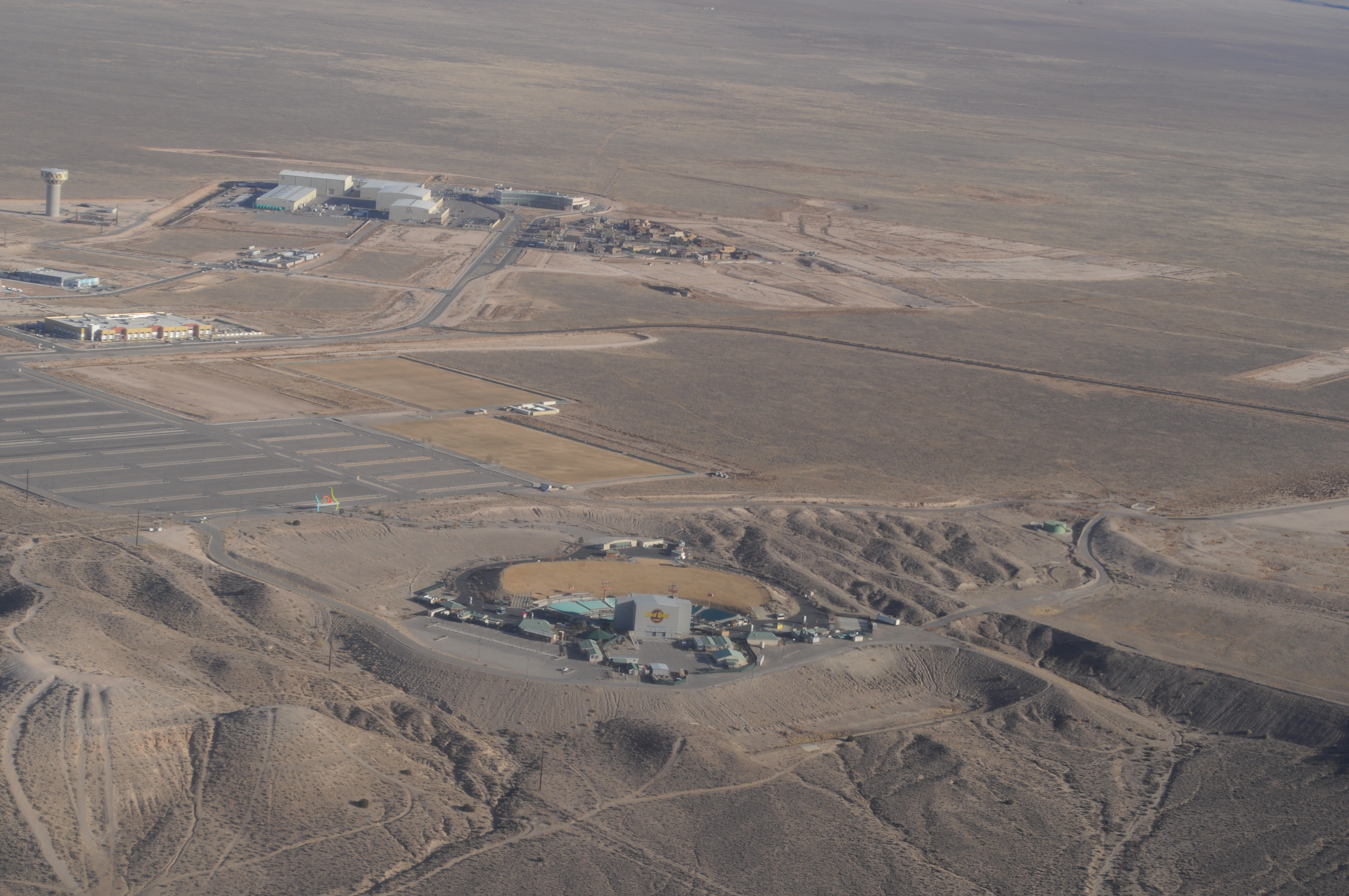
- Aerial view of the Isleta Amphitheater, Albuquerque, New Mexico

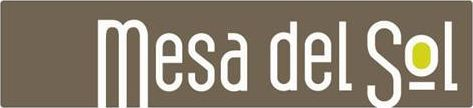
- Interactive map of Mesa del Sol
- Coordinates: 34.99°N 106.63°W
- Country: United States
- City: Albuquerque, New Mexico

Government
  - Councilor: Isaac Benton
- Postal code: ZIP code

Mesa del Sol (Spanish for "tableland of the sun") is an uncompleted 16,000-acre (6,500 ha) mixed-use master planned community in Albuquerque, New Mexico.

== Geography ==
Mesa del Sol, a 12,900-acre (5,200 ha) mixed-use community, is located on Albuquerque's South Mesa. By combining job creation with sustainable urban community planning, Mesa del Sol will represent a blend of natural resources, economic objectives, and social amenities in a community with a forward-looking and distinct sense of place. Mesa del Sol is a sustainable city with plans to build 37,000 homes on 4,400 acres (1,800 ha) of residential property and 18,000,000 square feet (1,700,000 m^{2}) of office, industrial, and retail space.

Mesa Del Sol is located approximately 6 mi (10 km) southeast of downtown Albuquerque. It is bounded by Albuquerque International Sunport along the northwestern edge, Kirtland Air Force Base on the north and east sides, the Isleta Reservation to the south, and Interstate 25 to the west.

== Master plan ==
Mesa del Sol's master plan called for development over a 40-year span that would cover 9,000 acres (3,600 ha) of the 12,900-acre (5,200 ha) site. The remaining 3,200 acres (1,300 ha) was proposed for parks and open space. The project is expected to house 100,000 people, with a downtown area, 37,500 homes, 18,000,000 sq ft (1,700,000 m^{2}) of office space, 4,400 acres (1,800 ha) for residential and supporting retail, and 800 acres (320 ha) for schools including university branches. The master plan also includes two new interchanges providing access to Interstate 25 that would be financed as part of the development.

The initial master plan was completed by Calthorpe Associates, the urban design firm of Peter Calthorpe, in June 2005. Some of the major roads and linear open space corridors point toward important nearby mountain peaks. Among these are University Boulevard, which points toward Mosca Peak in the Manzano Mountains, and the linear open space in the first residential neighborhood, which points toward Mount Taylor.

The plan was designed to host high-capacity transit on the main boulevards to connect all of the village centers. The overall street network uses a series of "connector" streets at 1/4 mile spacing with one lane in each direction. This highly interconnected network allows the plan to minimize the use of larger arterial roads which can become barriers in a community. Small neighborhood centers including retail provide walkable destinations throughout the residential areas.

The land use diagram for the Calthorpe Associates plan for Mesa del Sol.

The road diagram for the Calthorpe Associates plan for Mesa del Sol.

The view diagram for the Calthorpe Associates plan for Mesa del Sol.

== History ==
Mesa del Sol was approved as part of a public-private partnership strategy with the New Mexico, Albuquerque and University of New Mexico. It has been in planning stages since the 1980s. In 2002, after an open bid process, the New Mexico State Land Office selected Forest City Enterprises as the developer of Mesa del Sol. The project broke ground in 2005 with University Boulevard extended to the community. Forest City Enterprises and Covington Capital Partners were the initial developers.

On March 17, 2011, Forest City announced that on March 28 it would break ground on the first phase of its residential development. Forest City plans to build 250 homes and models in the first phase, including infrastructure, and has selected four home builders including Rachel Matthew Homes, RayLee Homes, Paul Allen Homes and Pulte Homes. Builders estimate by early 2012, homes will be available for residents. The homes will range from 1,200 to 2,700 square feet (110 to 250 m^{2}) in size and will cost between $100,000 and $300,000.

In September 2015, a state audit showed a default judgement against approximately 2,700 acres (1,100 ha) of the undeveloped community and the land was placed in receivership.

In December 2017, with approximately 250 homes having been built, the Mesa Del Sol owners appealed to Albuquerque's Environment Planning Commission for changes to the master plan that might encourage more home building.

Netflix committed to purchasing Albuquerque Studios in 2018 and has employed nearly 4,000 local and, largely, minority film and production workers, merchants, and talent to support and create their shows and movies.

As it adds additional staff, Fidelity Investments is enlarging its Mesa del Sol human resources and regional client services support center. The company is expanding its 216,000 sq ft (20,100 m^{2}) structure at 5401 Watson SE, south of the airport, by about 10,000 sq ft (930 m^{2}). The cost of the renovation, according to the city building permit, is $2.5 million.

The smaller of the two former Schott Solar structures will be taken over by a Springfield, Missouri-based plastic pipe manufacturer for its second facility at the Mesa del Sol master-planned community. After it opens in the spring of 2015, this facility will eventually create 25 to 30 jobs. After an almost two-year search that encompassed Arizona and West Texas, United Poly Systems chose Albuquerque for the project.

== Smart Community ==
The innovative mixed-use Mesa del Sol community in the southern part of Albuquerque was recently highlighted in NEDO Focus, a global publication that specializes in energy, environmental, and industrial innovations. The article highlighted Mesa del Sol as one of the world's "Smart Communities" and highlighted the smart grid that powers the Aperture Center in Mesa del Sol.

The long-term development plan of the Land Office envisions up to nine towns, recreational areas, and industrial employment sectors that are all connected to the rest of Albuquerque by light rail.

Wastewater Treatment Facilities, the Mesa del Sol development, and a pretreatment and reuse plant in cooperation with the Kirtland Air Force Base might be built to handle the wastewater flows from the development. In order to reuse treated effluent for non-potable purposes, such as golf courses, parks, and other non-potable applications, the Mesa del Sol development has expressed interest in developing one such facility. The Kirtland Air Force has also expressed interest in using the new waste treatment building as a training facility for evaluating novel treatment options. With a reduced liquid flow stream, the facility would transport concentrated solids to the water reclamation plant.

=== Aperture Center ===
Architect and New Mexico native Antoine Predock designed the Aperture Center building which opened in late 2008 as the centerpiece of Mesa del Sol. It is a LEED-certified environmentally friendly building clad in a glass curtain wall inspired by the shape of bone cells. The $11 million town center building has retail shops and restaurants on the ground floor and offices above.

In 2016, the Aperture Center was purchased from Mesa Town Center Building 1 LLC by SC3 International which would relocate its headquarters to the building. At that time, the other tenants were the offices of Mesa Del Sol and the University of New Mexico's New Energy and Industrial Technology and Development Organization (NEDO). In 2018, Guzman Construction Solutions signed a lease for 17,000 sq ft (1,600 m^{2}) of space.

== In popular culture ==
The television show Breaking Bad (filmed in Albuquerque) utilized Mesa del Sol for most of the show's desert shoots and many notable scenes. Albuquerque Studios, located in the Mesa del Sol development, served as headquarters for the Breaking Bad film crew, as well as for the films The Avengers, The Lone Ranger, and The Book of Eli. The coordinates at which Breaking Bad character Walter White buries his money in the season 5 episode "Buried" — 34°59′12″N 106°36′31″W — actually points to Albuquerque Studios in Mesa del Sol.

== Championship Soccer Complex ==
A soccer complex has an agreement with Bernalillo County to construct facilities to make the property more useful to the New Mexico United Soccer Club and for other sports programs that plan to use the field.

== See also ==
- New Urbanism
- Sustainable city
- Peter Calthorpe
