= KJNI-LP =

- Lake Elsinore, California; United States
- Frequency: 101.7 MHz

Programming
- Format: Children's radio

Ownership
- Owner: Jennifer Smart Foundation

History
- First air date: November 12, 2014; 11 years ago

Technical information
- Licensing authority: FCC
- Facility ID: 193349
- Class: L1
- ERP: 100 watts
- HAAT: −14 meters (−46 ft)
- Transmitter coordinates: 33°39′29.20″N 117°15′25.80″W

Links
- Public license information: LMS
- Webcast: Listen live
- Website: jenniradio.com

KJNI-LP is a low power radio station broadcasting out of Lake Elsinore, California.

== History ==
KJNI-LP began broadcasting on November 12, 2014. The station’s programming was previously heard on the former KALY (now KSDK) in Albuquerque, New Mexico until it was sold in 2012 and flipped to oldies.
