= Weekly Alibi =

Newspaper in Albuquerque, New Mexico

Coordinates: 35°4′51.2″N 106°37′10.1″W

- Cover of the August 15–21, 2019, issue
- Type: Online Entertainment
- Owner: NuCity Publications
- Founder(s): Christopher Johnson and Daniel Scott
- Publisher: Constance Moss
- Editor: Devin D. O'Leary
- Managing editor: Dan Pennington
- News editor: August March
- Founded: 1992
- Ceased publication: 2020
- Language: English
- Headquarters: Albuquerque, New Mexico
- Circulation: 37,057 (as of June 2015)
- ISSN: 1088-0496
- Website: alibi.com
- Free online archives: Yes

Weekly Alibi, commonly referred to as The Alibi, was a free weekly news, arts, culture, and entertainment newspaper and website in Albuquerque, New Mexico. The main features were the website's award-winning news section, featuring cultural commentary by August March; the calendar listings; reviews and guides to arts; art criticism; entertainment news; music interviews; and film reviews by noted film critic/Managing Editor Devin O'Leary. Its "Chowtown" restaurant guide and its "Best of Burque" award issues, which covered everything from "Best Community Action Group" and "Best All-You-Can-Eat" to "Best Gay Bar" were popular features of Weekly Alibi.

Originally the newspaper was a bi-weekly newspaper called NuCity, but changed its name due to a similar Chicago newspaper entitled Newcity.

The newspaper and website were members of the Association of Alternative Newsmedia as well as the National Newspaper Association.

The Weekly Alibi is closed; its last edition was published in late August, 2020.

== See also ==
- Local iQ
