= KDSK-FM =

Oldies radio station in Grants, New Mexico

Simulcasts KDSK Los Ranchos de Albuquerque
- Grants, New Mexico; United States
- Frequency: 92.7 MHz
- Branding: KDSK Sound Souvenirs 1240 & 92.7

Programming
- Format: Oldies

Ownership
- Owner: KD Radio, Inc.
- Sister stations: KDSK, KMIN

History
- First air date: September 30, 1994
- Former call signs: KAIU (1994–2001)

Technical information
- Licensing authority: FCC
- Facility ID: 52454
- Class: C3
- ERP: 265 watts
- HAAT: 818 meters
- Transmitter coordinates: 35°7′9″N 107°54′8″W

Links
- Public license information: Public file; LMS
- Webcast: Listen Live
- Website: kdsk.com

KDSK-FM (92.7 MHz) is a radio station based in Grants, New Mexico, (population about 10,000), the county seat of Cibola County in western New Mexico.

KD Radio Incorporated (KD Radio) purchased KDSK-FM in January 2001. Having had much success with kdradio.com in California, it was decided to put the massive KD Radio oldies format of 7000 songs on the broadcast sister station, 50-year-old KMIN-AM (980 kHz). KDSK was a hot country station at this time. In April 2001 KMIN began streaming its Sound Souvenir's programming on the internet at kmin980.com. On June 14, 2004 KMIN's Sound Souvenir's format moved over to KDSK-FM. Due to the Sound Souvenir's strong showing in the ratings, number one in its market, management made the decision to move the format to the stronger KDSK-FM signal. This move was made after one week of simulcasting the Sound Souvenir's format on both KMIN-AM and KDSK-FM.

KDSK-FM has had construction permits from the Federal Communications Commission (FCC) since 2005 to increase its Class from a C2 station to a C1 station by moving its broadcasting tower on the south side of Mt. Taylor 20 miles closer to Albuquerque, increasing the antenna height by 2,500 feet, and by increasing its effective radiated power from 26,000 watts to 45,000 watts. The station's usable signal previously has been limited in Albuquerque to neighborhoods of higher elevation. The upgrade would significantly increase KDSK's city grade signal level coverage in the Albuquerque radio market. However the station has moved to the site at 265 watts class C3 covering the local area. In Albuquerque KDSK has instead relied on its AM station for coverage including a feed to FM translator K229CL 93.7. KD Radio is currently moving translator K297BG (107.3) to Rio Rancho to broadcast at 92.9 in the Albuquerque market.
