= KQLV (FM) =

K-Love radio station in Santa Fe, New Mexico

Coordinates: 35.2139°N 106.4509°W

Santa Fe, New Mexico; United States
- Broadcast area: Santa Fe/ Albuquerque areas
- Frequency: 90.7 MHz

Programming
- Format: Christian Contemporary
- Network: K-Love

Ownership
- Owner: Educational Media Foundation
- Sister stations: KQRI, KQGC

History
- First air date: 1987
- Former call signs: KSFR (1987–2007); KSFQ (2007–2009)

Technical information
- Licensing authority: FCC
- Class: C
- ERP: 19,810 watts
- HAAT: 1,261 meters (4,137 ft)

Links
- Public license information: Public file; LMS
- Website: klove.com

KQLV (90.7 FM) is an American radio station serving the Santa Fe and Albuquerque areas. It is a non-commercial station owned by Educational Media Foundation, broadcasting its K-Love satellite Christian Contemporary music format.

== History ==
90.7 started in 1987 as KSFR a community radio station for Santa Fe. It was a class A facility that broadcast at 3,000 watts. KSFR is owned by Santa Fe Community College and broadcasts non-commercial public radio programming.

When Clear Channel Communications announced its plan to go private in November 2006, they announced they intended to sell most of their radio stations outside of the top 100 Arbitron markets - including their Santa Fe-only stations KSFQ (101.1) and KBAC (98.1). Both were sold to EMF in early 2007, but on May 23, 2007 EMF sold KBAC to Hutton Broadcasting allowing it to continue its Adult Album Alternative format.

On June 29, 2007, KSFQ and KSFR (owned by Santa Fe Community College) announced that they intend on doing a frequency swap in the next three months, moving KSFQ to 90.7 FM and KSFR to 101.1 FM with KSFR expanding its broadcast area south into Albuquerque and north into Taos. When the transition was completed, KSFR simulcasted on both the 90.7 and 101.1 frequencies until the deal was approved by the FCC.

On July 19, 2007, the FCC accepted an application to move this station's transmitter to Sandia Crest and increase power to 20,000 watts effective radiated power giving it similar coverage of Albuquerque's strongest FM stations and upgrading the station from a class A to a class C facility. Educational Media Foundation also moved KQGC (then KQRI) based in Belen, from 90.7 to 91.1. It had completed this move by spring of 2009 and on May 31, 2009 moved the KQLV call letters to 90.7 from 105.5 in Bosque Farms. 105.5 is now KQRI broadcasting the Air 1 format.

=== K-Love in Albuquerque ===
K-Love was first heard in Albuquerque sometime in the late 1990s on FM translators K220GM Placitas (91.9) and now-defunct K213BT (90.5). Both had broadcast at just 10 watts. K-Love first gained a full powered station in the area in late 2004 on 105.5 Bosque Farms with callsign KQLV first assigned in 1998 when the station was based in Grants, New Mexico. Beginning on May 31, 2009 K-Love now airs on the full powered station at 90.7.
