= KYLZ (FM) =

- Albuquerque, New Mexico; United States
- Broadcast area: Albuquerque metropolitan area
- Frequency: 101.3 MHz
- Branding: The Hustle 101.3

Programming
- Format: Urban contemporary

Ownership
- Owner: Vanguard Media LLC
- Sister stations: KXOT, KOAZ, KRKE, KSFE

History
- First air date: 1994 (as KRZN)
- Former call signs: KWQK (1990–1994, CP); KRZN (1994–1997); KEZF (1997–1998); KRQS (1998–2001); KCHQ (11/2001-12/2001); KKRG (2001–2002); KJFA (2002–2006); KKRG (2006–2015); KJFA-FM (2015–2017); KSFE-FM (10/25-11/01/2017); KRKE-FM (2017–2022)

Technical information
- Licensing authority: FCC
- Facility ID: 16750
- Class: A
- ERP: 3,700 watts
- HAAT: 128 meters (420 ft)
- Transmitter coordinates: 35.0659°N 106.7834°W

Links
- Public license information: Public file; LMS
- Webcast: Listen Live

KYLZ (101.3 MHz) is a commercial FM radio station in Albuquerque, New Mexico. It is owned by Vanguard Media and airs an urban contemporary radio format mixed with some recent hits, branded as "The Hustle 101.3". The radio studios are at the Vanguard Radio Center on San Pedro Drive Northeast in the Uptown area of Northeast Albuquerque (roughly a mile north of Central Avenue).

KYLZ has an effective radiated power (ERP) of 3,700 watts. The transmitter is on 140th Street SW at Central Avenue SW (U.S. Route 66) near Interstate 40 in Albuquerque.

== Programming ==
KYLZ features hip-hop hits mostly from the 1990s and 2000s with a few recent hits. It often promotes itself as "hip-hop without the pop", emphasizing the absence of dance-pop or R&B hits often heard on other rhythmic contemporary stations. Mornings feature the "Rise and Grind" show. Afternoons (12pm-3pm) feature the "Midday Mayhem" with local comedians Robert "Buck D" Gipson and Tyler “Intern Ty” Lovely. From 4-7pm is the "Shut up and Talk Radio/TV" program. The station also hosts a local rap battle called "Thursday Throwdown" where local hip-hop artists can compete for airplay.

== History ==
This station was granted an original construction permit in October 1990 under call sign KWQK.

101.3 first signed on in September 1994 as KRZN, a station playing new-age music and smooth jazz, branded as "The Horizon". In October 1996, it was acquired by Simmons Media Group from Desert Media Inc. and would keep the Smooth Jazz format. In spring 1997, Simmons moved KRZN to the stronger 105.1 FM signal, which would make the format available in Santa Fe and other surrounding areas. However, the format was dropped in April 1999 in favor of Top 40.

In May 1997, 101.3 became KEZF, a Soft Adult Contemporary format branded as "Easy 101.3", which attempted to challenge KMGA. The format was dropped after about a year.

In the Summer of 1998, 101.3 changed again to a Rock music format branded as "K-Rock" with slogan "The Rock of New Mexico". The call letters would later change to KRQS. The format on this station was very similar to KZRR and often imitated features on that station such as the "All 80's Weekends". The Bob and Tom Show was added in morning drive in early 1999; it was the first time that program had aired in Albuquerque. In 2000, it had rebranded as "The Bone" and shifted to a more modern focused Active Rock format towards the end of its run at the end of the year.

On Christmas Day, 2000, Simmons had revived the Smooth Jazz format and "The Horizon" brand on 101.3. In November 2001, it had again moved back to 105.1 FM along with the KRQS call sign (later changed to KAJZ a year later).

In December 2001, 101.3 became "The Range" with a classic country music format to attract former listeners of KTBL, which had changed to Adult Alternative earlier that year. The new call letters were KKRG. In fall 2002, Simmons had sold its five FM stations to Hispanic Broadcasting Corporation (HBC), and the format was dropped to make way for Spanish-language programming. The "Range" was revived again in April 2004 on 105.1 after the smooth jazz format was moved to 101.7. It was dropped again in March 2006.

In November 2002, HBC launched a new Regional Mexican music format called "La Jefa" with new call letters KJFA. HBC became Univision Radio in 2003. For the first few years, KJFA was not as competitive with then-top Spanish station KLVO "Radio Lobo", but at the end of 2006, Univision moved KJFA to 105.1 FM, and made changes in programming, including adding the Piolin morning program which had helped make "La Jefa" the top Spanish-language station in the market for a few years.

KKRG logo 2006-2010

After KJFA moved, 101.3 broadcast a Spanish Oldies format used in many markets as "Recuerdo". Recuerdo was originally heard in Albuquerque on 105.1 FM in March 2006, but in December 2006, KKRG switched frequencies with KJFA, which had been on 101.3 for four years, moving KJFA's Regional Mexican format to the stronger 105.1 frequency and "Recuerdo" to 101.3. The KKRG call letters had also moved back to 101.3.

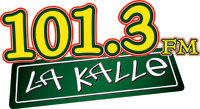
"La Kalle" logo 2010-2014

On May 28, 2010, KKRG began broadcasting a Latin Pop format branded as "La Kalle" (The Street). The format featured pop and reggaeton hits in Spanish as well as current popular English hits. The stations' presentation was mostly in Spanish. Initially, the station generated decent ratings, but after two years, KKRG had fallen to close to a 1 share overall.

Logo 2014-2015

On February 21, 2014, KKRG began stunting by airing a loop of Frank Sinatra's "Theme from New York, New York". On February 25, at 4 p.m., KKRG switched to a classic hip-hop format, branded as "Yo! 101.3 FM". This move came less than two months after Clear Channel launched the similarly formatted "Hot 100.9" on K265CA, giving the market two 1990s-based Rhythmic music stations. "Hot" moved to 95.1 (a 100 kW signal) in November 2014. On September 28, 2015, Univision moved "Yo!" to 105.1 FM while returning "La Jefa" to 101.3 FM. With the frequency swap, KKRG took on the call sign KJFA-FM.

On June 14, 2017, Univision announced that it would sell KJFA-FM (as well as its entire Albuquerque cluster) to American General Media, who in turn would sell the station to Vanguard Media (owner of contemporary jazz station KOAZ) to comply with Federal Communications Commission (FCC) ownership rules. The price for the sale to Vanguard Media was $250,000. The sale was approved by the FCC on August 23, 2017, and was consummated on September 1, 2017. Vanguard will also program KDLW under a time brokerage agreement with BB Broadcasting.

Logo 2017-2020

On September 18, 2017, the Regional Mexican format and "La Jefa" brand moved over to American General Media owned KARS/K275AO in Albuquerque and KSFE in Santa Fe. Nine days later, on September 27, KJFA-FM launched a new Soft AC format, branded as "Cindy 101.3". On October 25, 2017, KSFE swapped call letters with 102.9 FM (Pecos), with that station becoming KJFA-FM and 101.3 taking the KSFE-FM call sign. A week later, on November 1, 101.3 swapped call letters with 1090 AM (Milan), moving the KRKE call sign (as KRKE-FM) to 101.3, with 1090 taking KSFE. The KRKE call letters had previously been assigned to Vanguard's former properties at 1600 and 1550.

"Sunny" logo

By February 2020, the station had phased out the "Cindy" moniker, while the format had shifted to playing more upbeat gold-based mainstream adult contemporary music, eventually rebranding as "Sunny 101.3".

On September 1, 2020, KRKE-FM changed their format to classic hits, still under the "Sunny 101.3" branding.

On June 1, 2021, KRKE-FM changed their format back to classic hip hop as "The Hustle 101.3". On September 1, 2022, the call letters were changed to KYLZ, which were once assigned locally to 106.3 from 1997 to 2005. The KRKE call letters were moved to 1100 AM Peralta.
