= WHEP =

- Foley, Alabama; United States
- Broadcast area: Baldwin County, Alabama
- Frequency: 1310 kHz
- Branding: Radio Baldwin

Programming
- Language: English
- Format: Full service/oldies
- Affiliations: Dial Global

Ownership
- Owner: Stewart Broadcasting Company, Inc.

History
- First air date: May 31, 1953
- Call sign meaning: Howard E. Pill (original owner)

Technical information
- Licensing authority: FCC
- Facility ID: 63429
- Class: D
- Power: 2,500 watts (day); 43 watts (night)
- Transmitter coordinates: 30°26′38″N 87°40′52″W

Links
- Public license information: Public file; LMS
- Webcast: Listen Live
- Website: whep1310.com

WHEP (1310 AM, "Radio Baldwin") is an American radio station licensed to serve the community of Baldwin County. The station was established in 1953 and is owned by Stewart Broadcasting Company, Inc.

== Programming ==
WHEP broadcasts oldies music and news to Baldwin County, Alabama. In addition to its usual news and Rock’n Roll programming, WHEP airs a twice-daily radio program called Baldwin County Trading Post six days a week.

Weekday programming includes Breakfast in Baldwin with Kenny Graves, featuring news, sports, and weather, plus a daily church program from Berean Baptist Church. Mid-days feature Jack Bell playing all era of Rock’n Roll. The Paul Finebaum Sports Show airs weekday afternoons. Syndicated evening programming includes America's Radio News Network, a conservative talk show hosted by Jerry Doyle, and Advice Line from Dial Global's Talk Radio Network. Weekend programming typically includes music, news, and Auburn Tigers football or Atlanta Braves baseball in season, plus local church programs on Sunday mornings.

== History ==
This station launched on May 31, 1953, as a 1,000 watt daytime-only station under the ownership of Howard E. Pill's Alabama Gulf Radio, Inc. The station has been assigned the "WHEP" call sign by the U.S. Federal Communications Commission (FCC) since it was initially licensed.

The station was acquired by James E. Stewart, Sr.'s Stewart Broadcasting Company on May 1, 1961. In June 1980, station ownership applied to the FCC to transfer the broadcast license from the unincorporated Stewart Broadcasting Company to Stewart Broadcasting Company, Inc. The FCC approved the move on July 21, 1980.

In January 2003, James E. Stewart, Sr., transferred his 52% ownership stake in Stewart Broadcasting Company, Inc., to his son, Clark J. Stewart. After the transfer, the younger Stewart held 98% of the voting stock with his siblings Elizabeth Stewart Purvis and James E. Stewart, Jr., each holding 1%. The FCC approved this transfer of control on February 27, 2003. The transfer took place on March 6, 2003. This move made Clark J. Stewart the president of the company with his father stepping back to be vice-president.

From its launch in 1953, WHEP had been licensed to operate as a daytimer, restricted to broadcasting only during daylight hours to protect WDOD in Chattanooga, Tennessee from skywave interference. In July 2005, the station applied to the FCC for a construction permit to add nighttime service with a signal restricted to just 48 watts of power. The commission granted this permit on November 15, 2005, and after construction and testing were completed in September 2007, the station began licensed nighttime operation on December 6, 2007.

== Translators ==
WHEP programming is also carried on a broadcast translator station to extend or improve the coverage area of the station.

Call sign	Frequency	City of license	FID	ERP (W)	Class	FCC info
W223AX	(92.5 FM) FM	Foley, Alabama	143804	250	D	LMS
