= Local iQ =

US magazine

Coordinates: 35°5′36.4″N 106°38′56.4″W

- Cover of the July 4–17, 2013, issue
- Categories: Arts, culture and entertainment magazine
- Frequency: biweekly
- Publisher: Francine Maher Hopper
- Total circulation: readership of 75,000+, circulation 30,000
- First issue: April 2006
- Final issue: December 26, 2014
- Company: Sakura Inc.
- Country: United States
- Language: English
- Website: local-iq.com

Local iQ was a free arts, culture, and entertainment biweekly magazine published in Albuquerque, New Mexico. It featured information about various artists, celebrities, and entertainers within New Mexico's largest city and was distributed to subscribers across New Mexico's largest markets. Its coverage spanned art, fashion, entertainment, design, food, architecture, travel and more. Francine Maher Hopper is the founder and the publisher. Launched as a quarterly in 2006, the magazine eventually stopped being printed in 2014. Their website is no longer active.

The magazine, and its website, have been recommended by travel guides, such at those by Fodor's, and has covered many events within New Mexico and Albuquerque's entertainment scenes, including interviewing Breaking Bad star Bryan Cranston, Etsy's and Levitated Toy Factory's cofounder Jared Tarbell, and author John Nichols.

== See also ==
- Weekly Alibi
