= KKNS =

Radio station in Corrales–Albuquerque, New Mexico

Coordinates: 35°12′00″N 106°35′59″W

- Corrales, New Mexico; United States
- Broadcast area: Albuquerque metropolitan area
- Frequency: 1310 kHz
- Branding: KTNN

Programming
- Format: KTNN (Simulcast)

Ownership
- Owner: The Navajo Nation

History
- First air date: July 15, 1985
- Former call signs: KXAK (1985–1987); KIVA (1987–1988, 1992–1999); KZRQ (1988–1992); KBTK (1999–2003)
- Call sign meaning: KK News Source

Technical information
- Licensing authority: FCC
- Facility ID: 7050
- Class: D
- Power: 5,000 watts days 82 watts nights

Links
- Public license information: Public file; LMS

KKNS (1310 AM) is an American radio station licensed to Corrales, New Mexico, serving the Albuquerque metropolitan area. It is owned by The Navajo Nation and broadcasts talk and music programs in English and in the Navajo language.

By day, it is powered at 5,000 watts non-directional. But to reduce interference at night to other stations on 1310 AM, it reduces power to only 82 watts. The transmitter is on Montbel Place in Albuquerque.

== History ==
The sign-on of KXAK on July 15, 1985, returned 1310 kHz to use for the first time in Albuquerque since the demise of KARA in May 1968. KXAK, a contemporary Christian music station initially owned by Harold S. Schwartz and Associates, had been years in the making; the Federal Communications Commission had granted the permit in December 1979, but the station had suffered an unexpected setback when county commissioners denied the station's application to build a transmitter site in 1983 after KDEF, to which KXAK would have been adjacent, objected.

In 1986, a year after putting KXAK on the air, Schwartz sold its network of religious radio stations to management in a $9 million buyout; the new owners operated as the Mid-America Gospel Radio Network. Mid-America Gospel sold KXAK for $425,000 to the Daytona Group in 1987. The Daytona Group owned KIVA (105.1 FM); 1310 AM initially began simulcasting its new sister station in AM stereo.

After a year of simulcasting KIVA, 1310 AM regained its own identity in 1988 when it became KZRQ, airing the Z Rock syndicated rock format from the Satellite Music Network. KZRQ and KIVA-FM were sold in 1991 to Star of New Mexico, Inc., for $300,000. In 1992, 1310 AM switched to an adult standards format, and the KIVA and KZRQ call letters switched positions. The next year, Territorial Communications bought the pair for $900,000, forming a duopoly with KZKL-AM-FM. A majority stake in those four stations were then acquired by Simmons Media Group in 1996.

Simmons moved KIVA's adult standards format and call letters to 1580 kHz in 1999 as part of a cluster-wide format shuffle. In its place on 1310 bowed a new talk outlet, KBTK "City Talk". Four years later, Simmons rebranded the station as KKNS "News Source 1310", which lasted until 2005 and a flip to sports talk as "The Ticket".

In December 2006, Simmons sold KKNS to El Camino Communications for $860,000. The new ownership, which took over on January 12, 2007, retained none of the previous programming; the New Mexico State Aggies had to find a new radio home in Albuquerque for the second time in three months. El Camino flipped the station to Spanish oldies from the 1970s and 1980s, branding as "Los Éxitos de Siempre" (The Classic Hits). By early 2008, the station had changed its moniker to "La Norteñita". In June 2008, the station flipped to Regional Mexican, branding as "La Ley"; at the same time, KKNS began to rebroadcast on FM translator K240BL on 95.9 in Albuquerque. In the fall of 2011, the format changed to Spanish contemporary Christian as "El Camino".

Transmitter site problems dogged KKNS in the 2010s and almost prompted the station to lose its license. On October 1, 2012, the lease on KKNS's transmitter site was terminated; the station sought approval to transmit at 500 watts from a church site. This arrangement only lasted until April 1, 2013, when the temporary antenna was vandalized, forcing Camino to ask for authority to go silent. During this time, the FM translator switched to carrying KIVA (1600 AM).

A construction permit for a new tower site was issued on December 23, 2015, and it was allowed to upgrade from 500 watts daytime to 3,500 using the facility under special temporary authority. During some of this time, the station was brokered as a Spanish-language Christian outlet known as "Radio Amor". A final license to cover was finally filed for on January 6, 2020.

In April 2020, Camino filed to donate the station to the Navajo Nation; the station will continue to be operated commercially by its Native Broadcast Enterprises unit, which runs KTNN and KWRK. The Navajo Nation assumed $16,000 in regulatory fees to be paid by KKNS in the deal. The transaction was consummated on August 27, 2020.
