= KXKS (AM) =

Christian radio station in Albuquerque, New Mexico

- Albuquerque, New Mexico; United States
- Frequency: 1190 kHz
- Branding: The Answer

Programming
- Language: English
- Format: Conservative talk
- Affiliations: Salem Radio Network

Ownership
- Owner: Wild West Radio Corporation
- Sister stations: KKIM

History
- First air date: 1970; 56 years ago
- Former call signs: KPAR (1970–1979); KKJY (1979–1979)

Technical information
- Licensing authority: FCC
- Facility ID: 13789
- Class: D
- Power: 10,000 watts (day); 24 watts (night)
- Transmitter coordinates: 35°3′4.2″N 106°38′36.1″W

Links
- Public license information: Public file; LMS
- Webcast: Listen live
- Website: www.wilkinsradio.com/our-stations/kxks-1190am-albuquerque-nm/

KXKS (1190 kHz) is an AM radio station currently broadcasting a conservative talk radio format. Licensed to Albuquerque, New Mexico, the station is currently owned by Wild West Radio Corporation.

The station was briefly operated by Rock of Talk LLC, owners of KIVA 1600 via a local marketing agreement. The full-time sports outlet from Fox Sports Radio on KXKS allowed for KIVA to focus more on news. The local "Rock of Talk" program was featured on both stations in the afternoon.

== History ==
The station went on the air as KPAR around 1970. The station's call sign changed to KKJY on January 23, 1979. On November 19, 1979, the station changed its call sign to the current KXKS. KXKS broadcast Spanish-language programming for over 20 years. In 2004, then–owner Clear Channel Communications sold KXKS to Wilkins Radio, and later that year the format was changed to Christian talk and teaching. In late 2014 Wilkins had purchased KKIM 1000 from American General Media. In early 2015 the Christian programming had moved over to KKIM. On April 1, 2015, KXKS had changed their format to sports talk. The station had agreed to cary Art Bell's "Midnight in the Desert" starting July 20, 2015, however the sports talk format was dropped just before the show was to debut. KXKS would briefly simulcast KKIM before switching to Spanish language programming sometime in September 2015. On February 27, 2017, KXKS switched to Christian radio, with the branding "New Life Today".

On July 27, 2020, KXKS changed their format from Christian radio to conservative talk, branded "The Answer", with programming from Salem Media Group.
