= WYND (AM) =

- DeLand, Florida; United States
- Broadcast area: Daytona Beach metropolitan area
- Frequency: 1310 kHz

Programming
- Format: Christian radio

Ownership
- Owner: Clarence and Andrea Williams; (Proclaim Media Group, LLC)

History
- First air date: January 8, 1957
- Former call signs: WOOO (1957–1973); WKKX (1973–1980); WDLF (1980–1984)

Technical information
- Licensing authority: FCC
- Facility ID: 7741
- Class: D
- Power: 10,400 watts (day); 115 watts (night)
- Transmitter coordinates: 28°59′57.00″N 81°17′54.00″W
- Translator: 96.1 W241CZ (DeLand)

Links
- Public license information: Public file; LMS
- Website: wynd-radio.com

WYND (1310 AM) is a commercial radio station licensed to DeLand, Florida, United States, and serving the Daytona Beach metropolitan area. The station is owned by Clarence and Andrea Williams, through licensee Proclaim Media Group, LLC., and broadcasts a Christian format.

WYND's studios and transmitter are co-located on East Taylor Road, near U.S. Route 17 in DeLand. Programming is also heard on 250-watt FM translator W241CZ at 96.1 MHz in DeLand.

== History ==
=== WOOO ===
The construction permit for this radio station was first issued to Trio Broadcasting Company on June 6, 1956, following its application to the FCC in December 1955. The call sign was WOOO. Transmitter facilities were constructed on East Taylor Road in DeLand, with studios in the Conrad Building, downtown. WOOO signed on the air on January 8, 1957. The original power output was 1,000 watts. It was a daytimer, required to go off the air at sunset. On June 25, 1957, the station was granted a construction permit to increase its power to 5,000 watts, but still daytime only.

The power increase was completed in 1958. In November 1961, the station was sold to Polaris Broadcasting, Inc., only to later be put into receivership in September 1964. That year, the license was transferred to receiver Brian Tolby, operating the station as Shom Broadcasters.

=== WKKX, WDLF ===
In October 1967, the station was granted pre-sunrise authority, which allowed it to operate at 500 watts two hours prior to local sunrise. On May 3, 1973, the station changed its call letters to WKKX, and its ownership to DeLand Broadcasters, Incorporated. Studios were also moved to 700 Highway 92 in DeLand, but were later re-located to 118 1/2 North Boulevard in DeLand. In 1978, the station came under new ownership by Mid-Florida Broadcasting Company.

The station was assigned the call letters WDLF on December 22, 1980, months after coming under new ownership but the licensee name was retained as Mid-Florida Broadcasting Company briefly before the change in name to West Volusia Communications Corporation.

=== WYND ===
On April 6, 1984, not long after its sale from West Volusia Communications to John Locke, the station changed its call sign to the current WYND. In December 1986, the station was sold to Dr. D. Stephen Hollis for $255,000 and coming under control of station general manager Buddy Tucker some years later. At some point around this time, studios were co-located with the station's transmitter facility along East Taylor Road.

WYND was granted limited nighttime power of 95 watts, allowing it to stay on the air around-the-clock if desired. In 2006, WYND was granted a construction permit to increase its power to its current values. In August 2018, Buddy Tucker Associates agreed to sell WYND to its current owner. The FCC granted to transfer of license on October 12, 2018.

== Programming ==
WYND airs a mix of Christian talk and teaching shows and Christian adult contemporary music, with Southern Gospel and Christian Jazz heard on Sundays.

== Translator ==
WYND is rebroadcast over F.M. translator station W241CZ.

Broadcast translator for WYND
Call sign	Frequency	City of license	FID	ERP (W)	HAAT	Class	Transmitter coordinates	FCC info
W241CZ	96.1 FM	Deland, Florida	202630	250	0 m (0 ft)	D	28°58′31″N 81°18′1.5″W	LMS
