= KOAZ =

Radio station in Isleta Pueblo, New Mexico

- Isleta, New Mexico; United States
- Broadcast area: Albuquerque, New Mexico
- Frequency: 1510 kHz
- Branding: Rewind 103.7

Programming
- Format: Urban oldies

Ownership
- Owner: Vanguard Media LLC
- Sister stations: KRKE, KSFE, KXOT, KYLZ

History
- First air date: February 14, 1984 (as KABR)
- Former call signs: KABR (1984–2010); KMYN (2010–2011)
- Former frequencies: 1500 kHz (1984–2010)
- Call sign meaning: K OAsis Z substituted for S (previous branding)

Technical information
- Licensing authority: FCC
- Facility ID: 65389
- Class: D
- Power: 5,000 watts day 4,200 watts critical hours 25 watts night
- Transmitter coordinates: 34°58′46″N 106°44′13″W
- Translator: 103.7 K279BP (Albuquerque)

Links
- Public license information: Public file; LMS
- Webcast: Listen Live

KOAZ (1510 AM) is a radio station licensed to Vanguard Media LLC. at Isleta Pueblo, New Mexico. It is operating at "Isleta" with 5,000 watts daytime and 25 watts nighttime, from 34°58′46.2″N 106°44′15.1″W. The station serves the Albuquerque Metropolitan area. Its studios are located in Northeast Albuquerque (a mile north of Central Avenue).

KOAZ broadcasts an urban oldies music format branded as "Rewind 103-7". The station uses a 250–watt FM translator K279BP on 103.7 MHz broadcasting from Sandia Crest in Albuquerque to air the format in stereo on the FM band as well as allowing it to be heard better during nighttime hours when the AM station runs at only 25 watts.

== History ==
The station signed the air as KABR by the Alamo Navajo School Board on 14 February 1984.

When applying in October 2007 to start KABR-FM, the Alamo Navajo School Board pledged to divest itself of the AM station upon receiving its license for the FM station. The FCC granted the license for KABR-FM.

In 2010, the FCC granted the application to assign KABR (AM) to Martha Whitman and the construction permit to serve Isleta Pueblo by moving KABR (AM), making it part of the KTBL antenna system. The ownership reassignment has since been consummated.

Throughout 2011, it simulcasted a country music format from KMIN AM out of Grants, New Mexico branded as "K-Mine" with callsign KMYN.

In early February 2012, it began to rebroadcast on 103.7 FM in Albuquerque. The translator was originally K216DV and broadcast at 91.1 FM in Albuquerque. It was owned by the Paulino Bernal Evangelism and aired its "Radio Christiana" Spanish-language ministry from its main station KCZO in Carrizo Springs, Texas from about 1999 until the late 2000s at just 10 watts. 91.1 is part of the non-commercial section of the FM band, so it was moved to 103.7 in early 2012 to broadcast a commercial format as well as increase power to 250 watts from atop Sandia Crest, giving the station a strong signal across Albuquerque.

Previous logo

== Smooth Jazz radio in Albuquerque/Santa Fe ==
The first station in Albuquerque to adopt the smooth jazz format was KRZN-FM 101.3 "The Horizon" in 1994, launched just weeks before the areas' long time easy listening station KKJY-FM "K-Joy" switched to a classic hits format. In 1997, KRZN would move to 105.1, making the format available in Santa Fe, but after two years, it would switch to a top 40 format, leaving the market without a smooth jazz outlet much to the dismay of its fans. However, on Christmas Day 2000, The Horizon would return to the airwaves on 101.3 and would once again get another shot on 105.1 in late 2001 and changing its callsign to KAJZ-FM. But by 2004, it would be moved to the weaker 101.7 frequency and would be cut back to just two personalities and running a mostly automated format before it was axed. Ever since Univision's former smooth jazz station KAJZ (101.7 FM, now known as KQTM) changed to a rhythmic oldies (now Sports talk) format in October 2005, the Albuquerque market was left without a smooth jazz radio station for about a year.

American General Media had briefly run a smooth jazz format on KBOM-FM 94.7 in Santa Fe in 2004-2005, a few months after KAJZ moved to 101.7 which only covers Albuquerque.

In April 2005, Clear Channel Communications (now iHeartMedia) launched a smooth jazz station for the Santa Fe market on KSFQ (now KSFR) 101.1 FM, branded as "The Cat". KSFQ had been since been sold in 2007 which saw the end of that format.

Clear Channel launched another smooth jazz format on KABQ-FM 104.1 on September 29, 2006, which covers both the Albuquerque and Santa Fe markets. This format was programmed by satellite from Broadcast Architecture. However, in December 2007, Clear Channel did a frequency swap with modern rock station KTEG, moving it to 104.1 and the smooth jazz format on KABQ-FM to the weaker 104.7 signal. On May 2, 2009, KABQ-FM switched to a classic country music format. This format would be absent from local airwaves until the launch of KOAZ nearly three years later.

== On-Air Hosts ==
The current weekday lineup of hosts on KOAZ is as follows:

- Jeff Young: 5 am-10 am
- Katie Cole: 10 am-3 pm
- Tony Wise: 3 pm-7 pm
- Steve Hibbard: 7 pm-12 midnight
- Chris Cannon: 12 midnight-5 am

Former hosts:

- Blake Williams (died on June 25, 2017)

== Translators ==
Broadcast translator for KOAZ
| Call sign | Frequency | City of license | FID | ERP (W) | Class | FCC info |
|---|---|---|---|---|---|---|
| K279BP | 103.7 FM | Albuquerque, New Mexico | 89268 | 250 | D | LMS |

A construction permit was granted by the FCC on February 22, 2016 to move translator K292FW from Taos, New Mexico to Tijeras, New Mexico and broadcast on 96.7 FM at 15 watts with KOAZ as the source station. The translator is owned by Telebeeper of New Mexico which also owns K229CL 93.7 in Albuquerque. This translator would've made KOAZ available to residents living in the Sandia mountains where reception of most FM stations is often difficult. However the permit expired in February 2019 without the changes being completed and the translator remains in Taos. In July 2020 Telebeeper of New Mexico sold K292FW to the American General Media Foundation for $35,000 and will air classical station KHFM.

Beginning in June 2013, KOAZ added another FM translator K240EC in Santa Fe, broadcasting at 95.9. The station was also simulcast on KSFE 96.7 in Grants which also served as the source station for K240EC. On September 1, 2020 KOAZ was dropped from KSFE and K240EC and was replaced by the Regional Mexican programming from sister station KDLW "La Zeta" 106.3.
