= KQNM =

Relevant Radio station in Albuquerque, New Mexico

- Albuquerque, New Mexico; United States
- Broadcast area: Albuquerque metropolitan area
- Frequency: 1550 kHz
- Branding: Relevant Radio

Programming
- Language: English
- Format: Catholic radio
- Network: Relevant Radio

Ownership
- Owner: Relevant Radio, Inc.

History
- First air date: March 29, 1972 (as KAMX)
- Former call signs: KAMX (1972–1994); KDZZ (1994–1996); KHTZ (1996–1999); KSYU (1999); KQEO (1999–2000); KYJY (2000); KKJY (2000–2008); KQNM (2008–2009); KIVA (2009–2012); KRKE (2012–2015)
- Call sign meaning: "New Mexico"

Technical information
- Licensing authority: FCC
- Facility ID: 4705
- Class: D
- Power: 10,000 watts day 27 watts night
- Transmitter coordinates: 35°10′14″N 106°37′51″W
- Translator: 98.9 K255AU (Corrales)

Links
- Public license information: Public file; LMS
- Webcast: Listen Live
- Website: relevantradio.com

KQNM (1550 kHz) is an AM radio station in Albuquerque, New Mexico. KQNM is owned by Relevant Radio, Inc. and airs a Catholic radio ministry featuring network talk programs and broadcasts of the mass.

KQNM broadcasts at 10,000 watts by day. But because AM 1550 is a clear-channel frequency reserved for Mexico and Canada, the station must drastically reduce power at night to 27 watts. The transmitter tower is in the city's Old Town district northwest of downtown. KQNM programming is simulcast on FM translator K255AU 98.9 MHz, licensed to nearby Corrales.

== History ==
This station originally broadcast on 1520 AM as KAMX in 1972. It had aired Spanish language programming throughout the 1970s. Later, it mostly carried programming that was broadcast on the 107.9 FM frequency. However, the AM station could only be heard during daytime hours due to night time interference from KOMA (now KOKC) from Oklahoma City. In 1995, it ended the simulcast with 107.9 and began to run children's programming from Radio AAHS as KDZZ, but it would return to simulcasting 107.9 in late 1996 under the call sign KHTZ.

"Joy" logo

In 2000, the station was sold to Vanguard Media and moved to the 1550 frequency under the call letters KKJY. The new dial position allowed the station to increase its daytime power and initiate nighttime operation. It began broadcasting an adult standards format to fill a void left after KIVA dropped standards for talk radio. It picked up the KKJY call sign that had once belonged locally to 100.3 FM, which aired a long running easy listening format from 1979 to 1994. The new station was branded as "Joy AM".

In 2006, the station's format shifted to soft adult contemporary. On July 25, 2008, it once again changed its call sign to KQNM and called itself "Soft Favorites 1550". On May 18, 2009, it changed to KIVA while moving the KQNM call sign to 1100 kHz in Milan, New Mexico. The format was changed to talk radio on June 15, 2009. On August 28, 2012, the station swapped dial positions with KIVA, moving the talk format and KIVA call sign to 1600, with KRKE moving from 1600 to 1550.

On September 22, 2015, the call sign were changed back to KQNM, with KRKE moving to 1090 in Milan. Soon after, Vanguard took the station off the air and put the station up for sale. In 2014, Vanguard divested KIVA to Rock of Talk LLC. IHR Educational Broadcasting later purchased the station, and began to air its Catholic radio format beginning in late September 2016. KQNM flipped to the Relevant Radio branding when IHR Educational Broadcasting and Starboard Media Foundation consummated their merger on June 30, 2017.

== FM broadcast ==
107.5 (2011–2013)

In early May 2011, KRKE (then on 1600 AM) began airing on 99-watt FM translator K298BK (107.5 FM) in Sandia, and rebranded as "Cool 107.5". The station had previously been called "Real Oldies 1600". The station also changed its website to cool1075.com. The translator was owned by the Educational Media Foundation.

This change put the station in competition with KABG, which airs an Oldies/Classic Hits format, mainly playing music from the 60s, 70s and 80s. For the first year or so, the station continued to focus on the traditional 1960s based oldies format it had aired since 2005, when the station was only heard on AM. Since mid-2012, it began to shift more to classic hits like KABG and most other FM oldies stations.

94.5 (2013–2015)

A construction permit was granted to the station on April 18, 2012 to move to the 94.5 frequency and increase power to the class maximum of 250 watts. On February 14, 2013, the station moved to the new frequency as K233CG while re-branding as "The Greatest Hits KOOL 94.5", as well as completing a shift in the format to playing music from the 1970s and '80s, competing directly with KABG. "KOOL" was promoted as "Clutter-Free", featuring a music-intensive presentation without programming elements such as announcers, news, weather and traffic reports. KRKE, however, generated low ratings, and since July 2013, faced additional competition from KABQ-FM, which featured a 1970s-centric version of the format. In early 2014, the format had been shifting to focus more on music from the 1980s. On May 12 of that year, at 12:00 p.m., 1550 and 94.5 re-branded as "94-5 The 80's Channel" with an all-80s hits format, making it the first time this format has aired in the Albuquerque market since KKOB-FM dropped the format in late 2002. The last song on "Kool" was Hold On by Wilson Phillips, while the first song on "The 80's Channel" was Video Killed the Radio Star by The Buggles. Originally, the new format had a large emphasis on music from the New Wave genre from artists like Duran Duran, The Police, and Blondie as well as early alternative rock acts such as The Cure, R.E.M., and The Psychedelic Furs. However, with ratings very low, the station adjusted its playlist to include more pop and hard rock acts from the 1980s in late July 2015. The station's website had also been taken down, along with its live stream and Facebook page.

At 10:38 p.m. on September 27, 2015, an announcement began playing on a repeating loop saying that the format was leaving the air and would return after the first of the year on a different frequency. It also identified the station as "KQNM Albuquerque", and suggested that listeners tune into KDSK, which airs an oldies format. The last song played was "Take Me Home Tonight" by Eddie Money. However the format did not reappear at the stated time. Meanwhile, on May 2, 2016, iHeartMedia shifted KABQ-FM to an 80s hits format which lasted until April 2021. The "Eighties Channel" would be relaunched seven years later in October 2022 on KRKE 1100 AM and K229CL 93.7.

At around 2 p.m. on September 30, KQNM began airing long sets of mostly trance music, both instrumental and vocal, with no sweepers or commercials but only identifying itself once an hour as "EDM 94-5", followed by the legal identification around 10 minutes from the top of the hour. This went on for about six days.

As of October 6, 2015, the station was in a dead air status, with neither static nor audio broadcast. Since October 9, both KQNM and K233CG were off the air. On October 19, KQNM filed a silent notification with the Federal Communications Commission, stating programming had been discontinued in preparation for a sale of the station.

Additionally, Educational Media Foundation filed a silent notification for K233CG on November 5, 2015, stating that the translator would be off the air until a new feed station could be found. The request was granted on December 4; however, 94.5 returned to the air on December 1, rebroadcasting the Air 1 format from KQRI, while KQNM remained off the air. K233CG was sold to Martha Whitman, owner of KOAZ and K279BP, in late June 2016 for $61,431.66. Whitman had then reached a deal to sale the translator to Cumulus Media for $425,000. On September 1, 2016, K233CG began to rebroadcast KKOB.

98.9 (2016–present)

On February 5, 2016, a construction permit was granted by the FCC to upgrade translator K255AU (98.9 FM) from 10 watts to 70 watts, with KQNM as the feed station. K255AU is owned by Immaculate Heart Radio, a Catholic radio ministry, which currently relays KXXQ in Milan. In early July 2016, Immaculate Heart Radio purchased KQNM for $250,000. The sale was approved by the FCC on September 15, 2016, and the Catholic format began airing on KQNM in late September.
