= KKIM (AM) =

- Albuquerque, New Mexico; United States
- Broadcast area: Albuquerque metropolitan area
- Frequency: 1000 kHz

Programming
- Format: Christian radio

Ownership
- Owner: Robert Wilkins; (Wild West Radio Corporation)
- Sister stations: KXKS

History
- First air date: April 15, 1972

Technical information
- Licensing authority: FCC
- Facility ID: 25524
- Class: D
- Power: 10,000 watts (day); 53 watts (night)
- Transmitter coordinates: 35°03′04″N 106°38′34″W

Links
- Public license information: Public file; LMS
- Webcast: Listen live
- Website: KKIM website

KKIM (1000 AM) is a commercial radio station licensed to Albuquerque, New Mexico, United States, broadcasting a Christian talk and teaching format. The station is owned by Robert Wilkins, through licensee Wild West Radio Corporation. KKIM's studios are located in Northeast Albuquerque.

The transmitter tower is on Arno Street SE near the Albuquerque International Sunport.

== History ==
KKIM first signed on the air on April 15, 1972. The station was originally a daytimer, required to go off the air at sunset. Since its earliest days, it has broadcast a Christian radio format. The original owner was Christian Enterprises, Inc. In 1976, an FM station was added, KLYT 88.3 FM.

On September 23, 2014, American General Media sold KKIM and KERI in Bakersfield, California, to South Carolina-based Christian broadcaster Wilkins Radio. This gave Wilkins ownership of another station in the Albuquerque radio market, along with KXKS 1190 AM. The sale was consummated on December 31, 2014, at a price of $587,500.

Wilkins had briefly leased KXKS to Rock of Talk LLC which changed the format to sports talk on April 1, 2015. However this was discontinued in July. KXKS began simulcasting KKIM until KXKS switched to Spanish language Christian programming in September 2015.
