= KSFE (FM) =

- Grants, New Mexico; United States
- Frequency: 96.7 MHz
- Branding: Interstate 96.7

Programming
- Format: Classic hits

Ownership
- Owner: Vanguard Media, LLC
- Sister stations: KOAZ, KRKE, KXOT, KYLZ

History
- First air date: December 2012
- Former call signs: KMYN (2012–2019)
- Call sign meaning: Santa FE

Technical information
- Licensing authority: FCC
- Facility ID: 183361
- Class: C3
- ERP: 265 watts
- HAAT: 818 m (2,684 ft)
- Transmitter coordinates: 35°15′11.1″N 107°35′48.1″W

Links
- Public license information: Public file; LMS

KSFE (96.7 MHz) is an FM radio station in Grants, New Mexico, United States. It is owned by Vanguard Media and features a classic hits format branded as "Interstate 96.7".

On August 15, 2023, the owner/management abruptly switched the format to classic hits.

The broadcasting tower is located at the La Mosca Lookout on Mount Taylor.

== History ==
The station launched in 2012 as KMYN, airing a classic country format simulcast from KMIN AM 980. Later in about 2016, it would switch to a simulcast of KOAZ airing a smooth jazz format while also feeding translator K240EC 95.9 in Santa Fe. It was sold by original owner Royal Diversified Industries to Vanguard Media effective July 1, 2020 for $375,000.

On September 1, 2020, KSFE switched to simulcasting the Regional Mexican format from KDLW "La Zeta" in Albuquerque. The simulcast was discontinued on January 3, 2022, when KDLW rebranded as "Exitos" and for the first time KSFE began to air its own programming.

Previous logo

In January 2022, KSFE switched to a dance music format, branded as "Pirate Radio 96.7". The station initially played a continuous mix of various EDM genres such as progressive house, deep house, drum and bass, techno, trance and many others from both local and international mix DJs. Zaid Gonzalez, a local DJ and producer was the content director for the station. By April 2023 it began to play shorter tracks as well some "EDM classics" each hour. On June 21, 2023, the format programmed by Gonzalez, would be replicated on KREV in San Francisco as "Revolution 92.7" under a new company called AutoPilotFM run by Vanguard Media owner Don Davis along with Kurt Nilson and Melinda Vega to program stations owned by the financially embattled Royce International Broadcasting. The "Pirate Radio" brand was also used on KREV seven months prior. However the dance programming was dropped on both stations in mid-August with KREV flipping to the hip-hop format and "The Hustle" brand used on sister-station KYLZ 101.3.

On August 15, 2023, KSFE dropped the dance music format and switched to classic hits, branded as "Interstate 96.7".
