= KSFR =

Public radio station in White Rock–Santa Fe, New Mexico

- White Rock, New Mexico; United States
- Broadcast area: Santa Fe, New Mexico
- Frequency: 101.1 MHz
- Branding: Santa Fe Public Radio

Programming
- Format: Variety
- Affiliations: Public Radio Exchange

Ownership
- Owner: Santa Fe Community College
- Operator: Northern New Mexico Radio Foundation

History
- First air date: 1966
- Former call signs: KTJB (1988–1988); KKBZ (1988–1990); KNLA (1990–1997); KSFQ (1997–2007)
- Call sign meaning: Santa Fe Radio

Technical information
- Licensing authority: FCC
- Facility ID: 67340
- Class: C2
- ERP: 2,500 watts
- HAAT: 538 meters (1,765 ft)
- Transmitter coordinates: 35°53′9.00″N 106°23′16.00″W

Links
- Public license information: Public file; LMS
- Website: www.ksfr.org

KSFR (101.1 FM) is a broadcast radio station licensed to White Rock, New Mexico, and serving the Santa Fe area. KSFR is Santa Fe's public–community radio station. It is owned by Santa Fe Community College, and managed by the 501(c)(3) non-profit Northern New Mexico Radio Foundation.

The station features a wide variety of locally-produced music, news and talk shows, as well as programming from the BBC World Service, Democracy Now!, and other national programs. KSFR's news team won the Associated Press' "New Mexico Station of the Year" award in 2004, 2005, and 2006. In 2015, the New Mexico Broadcasters Association named KSFR "Best Radio Station" in a large market.

The station originally broadcast at 90.7 FM. In July 2007, KSFR moved to 101.1 FM, becoming one of a handful of public radio stations nationally whose frequency is outside of the assigned spectrum for non-commercial stations (88-91 FM).

== History ==
101.1 White Rock had aired commercial programming before 2007. Over the years it has had an Oldies format as KNLA "LA 101" in the early 1990s and a '70s' hits format as KSFQ "Q 101" later in the decade. In 2000 it switched to Hot AC as "Mix 101" but would shift to rhythmic oldies after Clear Channel bought the station. It began a smooth jazz format called "The Cat" in early 2005 which ended in July 2007.

After Clear Channel announced its plan to go private in November 2006, they announced they intended to sell most of their radio stations outside of the top 100 Arbitron markets - including their Santa Fe-only stations KSFQ and KBAC. Both were sold to Educational Media Foundation, a religious broadcaster in 2007 however KBAC 98.1 was soon sold to Hutton Broadcasting so it could retain its locally programmed adult album alternative format.

On June 29, 2007, KSFQ and KSFR, announced that they intended on doing a frequency swap in the next three months, moving KSFQ to 90.7 FM and KSFR to 101.1 FM, with KSFR expanding its broadcast area south into Albuquerque and north into Taos. When the transition was completed, KSFR was simulcasting on both the 90.7 and 101.1 frequencies until the deal was approved by the FCC. 90.7 is now KQLV "K-Love" a Christian Contemporary music format.

=== Call letters ===
The call letters were originally used by an independent San Francisco classical music FM station, which began broadcasting on March 11, 1958. Al Levitt, its co-owner and general manager was one of the principal hosts. Program Director Bill Agee and Bruce Johansen, who later became President and CEO of NATPE (the National Association of Television Program Executives) were the other main personalities of this concert station. KSFR was purchased by Metromedia in October 1966. Metromedia began switching to a rock music format in the spring of 1968 and, on May 21, 1968, they changed the call letters of KSFR San Francisco to KSAN.

== See also ==
- List of community radio stations in the United States
