= KQGC =

Radio station in Belen, New Mexico (2006–2021)

Coordinates: 34.396°N 107.012°W

Belen, New Mexico; United States
- Broadcast area: Valencia County; Socorro County
- Frequency: 91.1 MHz
- Branding: Radio Nueva Vida

Ownership
- Owner: Carlos Arana; (Carlos Arana Ministries, Inc.)

History
- First air date: 2006
- Last air date: 2021
- Former call signs: KVLK (2003–2006); KQRI (2006–2009); KQGC (2009–2021)

Technical information
- Class: C3
- ERP: 7,000 watts
- HAAT: 49 meters (161 ft)

KQGC (91.1 MHz) was a radio station in the Albuquerque, New Mexico, market signing on in Spring 2006. It was licensed to Belen, New Mexico, south of Albuquerque. It was also last owned by Carlos Arana, through licensee Carlos Arana Ministries, Inc., and broadcasts Spanish-Christian radio network Radio Nueva Vida. Prior to November 2010, the station aired the "God's Country Radio Network" Positive Country format. This station, however, had a weak signal in Albuquerque.

Educational Media Foundation had filed an application with the FCC to move Santa Fe–based KSFR to Sandia Crest at 20,000 watts. Originally at 90.7 FM, EMF also filed on July 19, 2007 to move the station to 91.1 FM with changes to power and antenna height.

The Federal Communications Commission cancelled KQGC's license on May 19, 2021, due to the station having been silent for more than twelve months.
