= KYGR =

Alamo, New Mexico; United States
- Frequency: 88.1 MHz

Programming
- Format: Defunct (formerly Public radio)

Ownership
- Owner: Alamo Navajo School Board

History
- Former call signs: KABR-FM (2009–2012)

Technical information
- Licensing authority: FCC
- Facility ID: 173315
- Class: A
- ERP: 400 watts
- HAAT: −59.5 meters (−195 ft)
- Transmitter coordinates: 34°25′1″N 107°30′4″W

Links
- Public license information: Public file; LMS

KYGR (88.1 FM) was a radio station licensed to Alamo, New Mexico, United States. The station was owned by Alamo Navajo School Board.

Alamo Navajo School Board surrendered KYGR's license to the Federal Communications Commission on July 1, 2021, and the license was cancelled the same day.
