= KYFV =

Religious radio station in Armijo–Albuquerque, New Mexico

Coordinates: 35.054°N 106.859°W

- Armijo, New Mexico; United States
- Broadcast area: Albuquerque, New Mexico
- Frequency: 107.1 (MHz)

Programming
- Format: Religious

Ownership
- Owner: Bible Broadcasting Network

History
- First air date: 1988
- Former call signs: KMYI (1988–1991); KUCU (1991–1994); KNKT (1994–2021)
- Call sign meaning: Keeping Your Faith Victorious

Technical information
- Licensing authority: FCC
- Class: C2
- ERP: 24,500 watts
- HAAT: 215 meters (705 ft)

Links
- Public license information: Public file; LMS
- Website: station webpage

KYFV (107.1 FM) is a non-commercial radio station located in Armijo, New Mexico, broadcasting to the Albuquerque, New Mexico, area. It is owned by and affiliated with the Bible Broadcasting Network featuring bible teachings and traditional hymns.

== History ==
This station signed on in April 1988 as KMYI with an adult contemporary format branded as "My 107". It was owned by Matteucci Broadcasting. By January 1991, the format was changed to adult standards simulcast from sister station KDEF AM 1150. In May 1991, KMYI and KDEF were sold to Texas businessman George Chapman. By August, KDEF would switch to a sports talk format and 107.1 would then become KUCU and would switch to a country music format on September 15. By August 1992, the two stations had entered into a leased management agreement and purchase option with Clairmor Broadcasting, which owned country formatted KOLT-FM 105.9. KUCU would then shift its format to classic country. This also led to several layoffs at the stations in a "delayed consolidation move". On Christmas Eve 1992, KUCU began stunting with a loop of "Stairway to Heaven" by Led Zeppelin, emulating a stunt pulled the previous year by KLSK 104.1 when it switched from new age music to classic rock. On Christmas Day, it would launch a new age music format with a planned callsign change to KNUA. However, by New Year's Eve, the station had gone dark. Adding to the confusion, the station's phone lines had been disconnected and the studios vacated. All staff were laid off with KDEF going to satellite programming full-time and the general manager had left to manage two stations in North Carolina. It was stated that the transmitter had blown up. The FCC had immediately granted a new construction permit to rebuild the station. KUCU would return to the air in the summer of 1993 simulcasting the sports talk format from KDEF until it would be sold. In August 1994, Calvary of Albuquerque would purchase KUCU and KDEF for $800,000. Calvary would then spin off KDEF the following year to Ramh Corp. for $125,000. Following consummation in December 1994, the station became KNKT, airing religious programming. KNKT aired religious music and talk programming branded as "The Connection" for 27 years.

On March 25, 2021, Calvary Albuquerque, Inc. sold KNKT for $1.4 million to Bible Broadcasting Network. BBN has since converted the station to a non-commercial license. With the consummation of the sale on May 27, 2021, the call letters were changed to KYFV, while Calvary moved the KNKT call letters to 90.7 Cannon AFB, a satellite of KLYT. On May 28, 2021, following consummation, the station went silent while technical changes could be made according to the KNKT webpage. It returned to air on June 19. Much of the talk and bible teaching programs that aired on KNKT were moved over to KLYT 88.3, which changed its format from Christian Contemporary music and rebranded as "The Light" on May 31, 2021.
