= KMIN =

Radio station in Grants, New Mexico

- Grants, New Mexico; United States
- Frequency: 980 kHz

Programming
- Format: Country music

Ownership
- Owner: KD Radio, Inc.
- Sister stations: KDSK-FM

Technical information
- Licensing authority: FCC
- Facility ID: 15845
- Class: B
- Power: 1,000 watts day 250 watts night
- Transmitter coordinates: 35°9′5″N 107°52′31″W
- Translators: K282BW (104.3 MHz, Grants)

Links
- Public license information: Public file; LMS
- Website: kmin980.com

KMIN (980 AM) is a radio station broadcasting a country music format that is licensed to Grants, New Mexico, United States. The station is owned by KD Radio, Inc.

== Station history ==
KMIN signed on the air in July 1956 as the first radio station licensed to Grants, New Mexico. KMIN was the only station with a good strong signal between Gallup and Albuquerque. John Blake was the original owner of this new radio station. The programming was diverse. Easy listening music was heard in the mornings. Polka music was heard mid-days and classical in the afternoon. In those days, KMIN was required to sign off at sunset and sign on again at sunrise.

There are two explanations of what the call letters mean. One is that John Blake's wife was named Minnie. Min for short. The other explanation is that Grants was a mining town. For many years the station was called K-Mine Radio. No one seems to know which is true.

In 1961 John Blake and his partner Dave Button sold KMIN to Tom Foster from Center Texas. On July 15, 1962 the programming was changed to a Popular Music format. The first song of the new format was Toni Fisher singing "The Big Hurt". It was played by the man who would be the KMIN General Manager for 20 years, Bernie Bustos Senior.

In November 1964, KMIN was sold to James B. Barber who owned the station until 1983. Mr. Barber also owned the town newspaper at the time. KMIN stayed with the Pop format until 1975 when it was changed to Country Music. By the late 1970s, the format was a mix of Country and Popular music.

In 1983, another new owner, Don Davis of Albuquerque, purchased KMIN and moved the studios to their current location on 733 East Roosevelt Avenue. Don moved KMIN to 1400 on the dial for a brief period so it could stay on at night. When the U.S. Federal Communications Commission (FCC) changed the night time signal rules, KMIN moved back to 980 with a 250 watt signal at night. Davis put KMIN-FM on the air and moved the Country format to the FM dial. KMIN became a Rock & Roll Oldies station. KMIN-FM has had several call letter changes and in 2000 was sold to an out of state broadcasting company.

KD Radio Incorporated purchased KMIN and KDSK-FM in January 2001. Having had much success with kdradio.com in California, it was decided to put the massive KD Radio oldies format of 7000 songs on a broadcast station. The response has been very good.

KMIN is a community station and broadcasts local events like the annual Mt. Taylor Quadratholon, high school sports and La Fiesta De Colores.

On June 14, 2004 KMIN's Sound Souvenir's format moved over to the FM side of the dial, on KMIN's sister station KDSK located at 92.7 on the FM dial. Due to the Sound Souvenir's strong showing in the ratings, number one in its market, management made the decision to move the format to the stronger FM signal. KMIN 980 was changed to a Country format using the music that was sent to the station over the last 50 years, as well as today's current hits.

In 2010 KMIN was granted an FCC construction permit to move to a different transmitter site, increase day power to 5,000 watts and decrease night power to 230 watts.

In 2018, KMIN applied for and was granted FM translator K282BW to simulcast the AM station on 104.3.
