= KLYT =

Contemporary Christian music radio station in Albuquerque, New Mexico

- Albuquerque, New Mexico; United States
- Broadcast area: Albuquerque area
- Frequency: 88.3 MHz
- Branding: The Light

Programming
- Format: Christian radio

Ownership
- Owner: Calvary Albuquerque, Inc.

History
- First air date: September 11, 1976
- Call sign meaning: LYT is similar to "light"

Technical information
- Licensing authority: FCC
- Facility ID: 10945
- Class: C0
- ERP: 4,100 watts
- HAAT: 1,294.0 meters (4,245.4 ft)
- Transmitter coordinates: 35°12′50.2″N 106°27′1.7″W
- Translator: See below
- Repeater: See below

Links
- Public license information: Public file; LMS
- Webcast: Listen live
- Website: klyt.fm

KLYT (88.3 FM, "The Light") is a non-commercial radio station broadcasting a Christian talk and teaching format. The principal station is in Albuquerque, with two FM translators and two repeaters around New Mexico. The station is owned by Calvary Chapel of Albuquerque, Inc.

KLYT has an effective radiated power of 4,100 watts. The main transmitter is atop Sandia Peak.

== History ==
=== Foundation ===
KLYT is the longest-running FM Christian music station in the United States. KLYT signed on the air in September 1976 with a light contemporary Christian music format under the auspices of the newly formed Christian Broadcasting Academy. The vision of CBA founders, including Rev. Raymond Franks of Albuquerque's Evangel Temple Assembly of God, Paul Lehrman as program manager, and Dave Briggs as chief engineer, was to train Christians for careers in secular and religious broadcasting.

The station went on the air with a 24 hour/7 day a week format, even though there were originally only 6- or 7-disc jockeys to man the studio. Mike Haverland, Donna Neff, Jeff Simon, Ron Parks, and John Duffy played records, made Christian message spots on 8-track cartridges and gleaned news from the Albuquerque newspapers for broadcast. In the beginning, KLYT was commercial free, and the staff was largely unpaid. During these first few months of existence, the station's broadcast range constituted only a few miles over Albuquerque's Northeast area. Early brochures showed CBA students working with television cameras and in the radio station. KLYT-FM was licensed by the FCC as a non-profit, educational outlet for CBA, and volunteers operating the station were drawn directly from its classes.

=== Early years ===
Good Friday, 1978, marked the first major turning point for the young station. A University of Texas graduate and New York City broadcaster named Victor R. Emert was introduced to the KLYT staff as the new general manager. He had recently resigned as executive director of Drug Addicts Recovery Enterprises, a local, faith-based substance abuse treatment center for heroin addicts. Among the discussion topics during Emert's introductory staff meeting was the desire by the announcers to play the growing supply of rock, country and blues-based "Jesus Music" produced by artists such as Resurrection Band, Michael Omartian, Randy Stonehill and Larry Norman. Emert enthusiastically agreed to guide them in building the station into the premier "Christian Rock" station in the country. During this period, the station also helped book live performances by bands such a Mustard Seed Faith, Parable, Keith Green, 2nd Chapter of Acts and Phil Keaggy, whose records were a staple of KLYT programming.

Within a year, the station had a new board of directors. It also had a new transmitter located high above the city on Sandia Peak, thanks to a daring one-day adventure carried out by Dave Briggs and Jeff Simon. The new transmitter expanded KLYT's listening range from 10 to 100 miles. The studios moved to new facilities on Eubank Avenue.

Over the next few years, Christian rock began to play a larger role in KLYT's playlist, culminating with the launch of the "Christian Oriented Rock" (C.O.R.) format in 1982. Under the leadership of Emert, program director, Rudy Grande and Production Director, Michael Scott (morning show host and later program director) the station emerged as an influential force on Albuquerque's local radio scenes and on the national Christian broadcasting scene. KLYT was named "Contemporary Christian Radio Station of the Year" in 1980 by the Gospel Music Association. KLYT was also viewed as a hub station between Christian artists that resided on the west coast (especially in the Orange County area in Southern California) and other Christian artists northeast of Albuquerque.

Through a partnership with Mountaintop Promotions, KLYT brought in monthly concerts by emerging Christian rock artists such as Keith Green, Randy Matthews, Daniel Amos, Petra, DeGarmo and Key, Resurrection Band and other key players in the burgeoning Christian music industry. Students at area public schools would often hear KLYT during lunchtime in the school cafeteria as it was played in rotation with popular non-religious music stations.

The station's playlist during this period reflected a growing trend among artists that had already achieved fame in the secular music arena. Bob Dylan's albums were a mainstay (a very large poster for Dylan's Infidels LP filled the wall of Emert's office). KLYT listeners during the early 1980s also heard a broad range of Christian groups and solo artists that had hits on secular stations across the dial, including artists such as Bob Dylan, Donna Summer, Kerry Livgren (Kansas), Mark Farner (Grand Funk Railroad), Philip Bailey (Earth Wind & Fire), Al Green, Dan Peek (America), along with New Wave bands U2, After the Fire and Kajagoogoo. Each of these artists crossing over from the secular realm had their Christian music channeled and tracked through the religious music industry. However, there was some brief debate among the station's leadership on whether the station should play music from groups at the edge of the Christian music scene, including U2 and Vinyl Confessions-era Kansas. KLYT also released positive reviews of their albums and discussions of the topic in the station's monthly newspaper, the Sonlyght Special.

In addition to KLYT's music programming, listeners were also offered teaching programs. This included the "Rock and Religion" program produced in Sacramento, California and hosted by Mary Neely (Mike Roe of 77's fame was a young producer on the show). Other shows included "The Glory of Man," hosted by Joyce Emert, the general manager's wife and a highly regarded professor of English and religious studies at the University of New Mexico. Emert, Grande, Duffy, Scott and others also taught classes in broadcasting at the parent Christian Broadcasting Academy (CBA).

During this period, the bulk of the station's disk jockeys came from CBA's basic broadcasting class. Many aspiring broadcasters were able to obtain their Third Class Radio Operator's Permit through the CBA class, and gained valuable on-air experience hosting programs and producing shows for the station. The station also grew in stature within the Christian music industry, becoming a leader in youth-oriented music formatting and the development of relationships between the station's management and prominent artists.

=== A time of uncertainty ===
By the mid-1980s the station began to experience trouble. KLYT's programming veered away from its roots as a Christian music station. Attempts to rebrand KLYT as a "positive" music station without a distinctly religious orientation were not well received by KLYT's listener and contributor base. The net result was that the ministry's financial support base severely diminished between 1985 and 1986, bringing on the danger of bankruptcy.

With the departure of Emert, Grande and other core members of the staff, the station's board was left to make critical decision regarding the future of KLYT and CBA. An interim program director was appointed, and the station struggled to meet the paychecks of the diminishing staff. The board made the decision to attempt a revival of the station, focusing on what it was best known for, youth-oriented Christian music programming.

=== The Rich administration ===
In 1986, CBA's board of directors elevated member Randy Rich to general manager. Rich had served on the board since 1982, and had previously managed another Christian radio station in Albuquerque, KKIM. However, Rich's claim to fame was his experience as an NFL player. After playing for the New Mexico Lobos, he went on to a career with several professional teams, including the Denver Broncos, where Rich played the position of safety in Super Bowl XII. between the Broncos and Dallas Cowboys.^{2}

To help facilitate KLYT's recovery, Rich brought on Tucson talk show and sports host Mark Gilman (KNST) to head up programming and host the morning show, as well as develop a new high school sports broadcasting ministry.

The High on Sports program became Albuquerque's best-known high school sports show, and included coverage of the state playoffs at least three nights a week as well as broadcasts of state championship baseball games. The concept was that the sports programming was a sure-fire way to be on campus every week, giving KLYT better access for ministry to youth and helping it to promote Fellowship of Christian Athletes events. It was also designed to encourage students and parents to check out KLYT's non-sports programming in other dayparts. High on Sports also became a significant source of grant revenue for the station.

KLYT-sponsored concerts rebounded in the late-80's. The station's management regarded them as a particularly effective outreach for young people. Though popular and successful, there were some infamous highlights including outdoor concerts with Degarmo and Key during an 80 mile-per-hour windstorm, and a Daniel Amos concert overlooking a malfunctioning, "pea-green soup" waterpark pool (D.A. lead-singer Terry Scott Taylor refers the show as one of the worst concert experiences of his life). More successful concerts (Bryan Duncan, Kenny Marks, Kim Boyce, Resurrection Band) renewed the events as a hallmark of the KLYT legacy.

However, as KLYT regained ministry ground externally, Gilman decided to leave due to an inability to meet the schedule demands. Other stable and popular programs remained such as The Calvary Connection and All-Request Fridays with Dave Warner. Eventually, another Tucson import named Tom Terry (KVOI) was brought in to take over operations and programming.

Later, Rich brought aboard popular KOB-FM personality Peter Benson as program director and Heidi Chavez as sales director, along with and other key staff members as the station continued to strengthen its ministry. As vinyl records gave way to compact discs, KLYT regained its stature in Albuquerque's Evangelical community, and CBA expanded into areas such as concert promotion and magazine publishing.

=== Musical evolution ===
The playlist under Rich's management held even more strictly to what was distributed Christian music labels, which were now operating within the framework of a mature music promotion and distribution industry. Rich's first move was to eliminate many of the secular crossover musicians from the playlist, and out went Bob Dylan and U2 due to their wishy washy approach to their faith. This move was met with some outspoken opposition from some of the volunteers at the station. KLYT's new format was christened CHR, or "Christian Hit Music" as a counterpart to secular "Contemporary Hit Music" and "Top 40" pop stations along the dial.

In 1988, KLYT's stable of volunteer disc jockeys were clamoring for changes in the playlist. These concerns mirrored the cries for movement toward edgier Christian music that were discussed more than a decade earlier, and were a running theme throughout the history of the station. The station's management responded to these concerns by introducing a number of specialty shows catering to specific audiences. This included a Rap and Hip Hop show, a Christian rock "oldies" program and others.

Perhaps the most popular show in this lineup, Light as a Rock, was launched by Pete McConnell in the summer of 1988 as an outlet for Christian heavy metal, thrash and alternative music. This show became the bane of the station's management over McConnell's lack of desire to follow a playlist. The show soared in popularity among Christian heavy metal fans in Albuquerque. Later renamed G-Rock, the show gave a radio outlet to many Christian bands pushing the religious music envelope. The show played early underground and independent recordings by up and coming artists and groups that would go on to wider success, including Moby, Sixpence None the Richer and Over the Rhine.

=== Expanding ministry ===
As changes were underway in KLYT's programming, CBA boosted its presence in the community by expanding beyond radio programming. Most significantly, it launched the magazine Cutting Edge, a monthly current issues magazine in January 1991.

CBA also purchased a unique travelling concert stage dubbed "Swing Shift." This full-size mobile stage unfolded from a semi-tractor trailer bed, and allowed Christian music concerts and other events to be held by CBA throughout the state. Swing Shift bolstered KLYT's presence in towns throughout New Mexico as the station began transmitting to much of the state. Eventually, KLYT's signal was re-transmitted to nearly all of New Mexico's population centers. KLYT had grown from an Albuquerque radio station to a statewide media phenomenon.

=== Politics and religion ===
A characteristic of KLYT and CBA's peripheral ministries during the early 1990s was the emphasis on conservative politics. Terry offered commentary segments during KLYT's morning show, and offered socially conservative articles as the Editor of CBA's Cutting Edge Magazine. This included articles critical of local legislation on adult bookstores, the problem of street gangs in the city, and reaction to the 1991 Gulf War. After Terry's departure, the magazine took a hard-right turn under the editorship of Deswood Tome, and was shut down by CBA management in 1997.

=== International outreach ===
The Christian Broadcasting Academy also embarked on international reach. In 1992, a radio ministry associated with Campus Crusade for Christ contacted CBA's management about programming Christian music for the Middle East. After and initial trip to Egypt by Randy Rich and members of the KLYT board of directors, Operations manager Tom Terry and Asst. Music Director Walter Ratliff traveled to the Middle East to conduct focus groups with area church leaders.

=== The Calvary Chapel Era 2001–Present ===
KLYT and the Christian Broadcasting Academy were thrown into crisis again in 1999, culminating in the resignation of general manager Randy Rich. During this year, CBA was in good financial shape, and the community's support of the station was as strong as ever. One month after his resignation, the station's annual on-air fundraising campaign exceeded its goals, and CBA/KLYT had a healthy savings and projected budget for the following year. Despite Rich's departure, KLYT retained strong support across New Mexico's Christian community.

Even with the show of continued community support, Paul Saber, chairman of the Christian Broadcasting Academy's board (as well as a member of Calvary Chapel of Albuquerque's board), spearheaded an effort to have KLYT and its assets "gifted" to the Calvary Chapel of Albuquerque. In 2000, Saber also sold off his Albuquerque McDonald's restaurant franchises, and eventually moved to San Diego, California.

Non-Calvary members of the board were in the minority during the station's transfer process. A number of local Christian leaders lamented the single-church takeover of a station that had operated for 25 years by a network of Evangelical churches from a variety of denominations. The Christian Broadcasting Academy was dissolved, and Calvary-Albuquerque took over KLYT and its network of translators on January 1, 2001.

KLYT's facilities were combined with those of the church's existing commercial radio station, KNKT (107.1 FM). The staff was reduced, and automation increasingly replaced live announcers in most dayparts. KLYT's Peter Benson stayed on as a talk show host on KNKT and in programming the new KLYT, dubbed M88. By 2005, KLYT alumni Steve Reimann had rejoined the station's staff, and The Echoing Green's Joey Belville joined as music and special events director. Belville also went on to co-host a highly popular morning show on the station, dubbed "The 3 Amigos Morning Show," with veteran broadcasters Matt Gentry and Steve Jeter.

Later, KLYT's ownership by Calvary-Albuquerque became a key component of a pastoral shakeup at the church. In 2004, Calvary pastor Skip Heitzig left the church he founded to return to California. His hand-picked successor, Pete Nelson, later claimed that Heitzig asked to have KLYT's ownership transferred to a corporation he controlled. This transfer was voted down by local members of Calvary-Albuquerque's board.

Since its transfer, KLYT's funding has come from the church's tithing and donations, as well as from the sale of merchandise related to Heitzig and the network of Calvary Chapel churches around the country. The station also runs a limited number of grant announcements from companies around Albuquerque that donate to the station.

Despite the occasional turmoil throughout KLYT's three decades of youth-oriented radio programming, the station has maintained a strong standing in New Mexico's Evangelical community. It is often cited as one of the longest lasting stations of its kind, and has been periodically recognized by the Gospel Music Association and the National Religious Broadcasters association.

On June 27, 2011, KLYT shifted its format to Christian rock, rebranded as "Static Radio." The station's format targeted listeners ranging from middle school through college with a mix of Christian rock, pop and hip hop and also featured some select secular alternative rock songs labelled as "culture shock".

On April 5, 2015, KLYT rebranded as "Star 88" and promoted itself as "Vertical Worship * Christian Hits * Fresh Indie" and featured contemporary Christian music and teaching programs shared with then sister station KNKT.

On March 25, 2021, Calvary sold 107.1 KNKT to Bible Broadcasting Network. KLYT switched to a talk and bible teaching format as "The Light" on May 31, 2021, beginning at 5am. Star 88 will continue as an online stream. The KNKT call letters were moved to satellite station 90.7 at Cannon AFB near Clovis (formerly KKCJ).

== Repeaters ==
One high-power radio station repeats KLYT. KNKT (90.7 FM), licensed to Cannon Air Force Base, is a rimshot of the Clovis area. Another station, KPKJ (88.5 FM), licensed to Mentmore, was also a KLYT repeater until its license was cancelled in September 2023. Both facilities were originally owned by CSN International and then Calvary Chapel Costa Mesa when the latter acquired 26 full-power stations and another 25 translators in 2008. Calvary Albuquerque then bought them for $200,000 in 2010.

Station	Frequency	City	First air date	ERP	HAAT	Class	Facility ID	Coordinates
KNKT	90.7 MHz	Cannon AFB		25,000 watts	59 m (194 ft)	C3	122203	34°26′58″N 103°37′3″W

== Translators ==
In addition to the main station, KLYT is relayed by an additional two translators to widen its broadcast area.

Call sign	Frequency	City of license	FID	ERP (W)	Class	FCC info
K201CC	88.1 FM	Las Cruces, New Mexico	10927	250	D	LMS
K228DQ	93.5 FM	Portales, New Mexico	81230	174	D	LMS

Calvary has sold off most of its other translators that previously repeated KLYT. In 2012, after acquiring KKCJ, it sold K201CY, its translator in Clovis. K201CY was sold to Grace Community Church of Amarillo. The network donated nine translators, in locations including Alamogordo, Silver City, Roswell, and Alamosa, Colorado, to VCY America in 2019.
