= KDSK (AM) =

- Los Ranchos de Albuquerque, New Mexico; United States
- Broadcast area: Albuquerque metropolitan area
- Frequency: 1240 kHz
- Branding: KDSK Sound Souvenirs 1240 & 92.7

Programming
- Format: Oldies
- Affiliations: SRN News

Ownership
- Owner: Derek Underhill; (KD Radio, Inc.)
- Sister stations: KDSK-FM, KMIN

History
- First air date: 1983 (as KLTN)
- Former call signs: KLTN (1981–1988); KALY (1988–2013)

Technical information
- Licensing authority: FCC
- Facility ID: 59687
- Class: C
- Power: 1,000 watts unlimited
- Transmitter coordinates: 35°12′6″N 106°35′56″W
- Translator: 92.9 K225CH (Rio Rancho)
- Repeater: 92.7 KDSK-FM (Grants)

Links
- Public license information: Public file; LMS
- Webcast: Listen Live
- Website: kdsk.com

KDSK (1240 kHz) is a commercial AM radio station, licensed to Los Ranchos de Albuquerque, New Mexico, and serving the Albuquerque metropolitan area radio market. It broadcasts an oldies radio format with a playlist of approximately 10,000 songs from the 1950s through the 1980s. Hourly news updates from SRN News are featured at the bottom of the hour.

1240 KDSK is simulcast with sister station KDSK-FM 92.7 MHz in Grants, New Mexico. KDSK is also heard on FM translator station 92.9 K225CH in Rio Rancho.

== History ==
=== Latin and Children's Formats ===
The station signed on as KLTN in 1983. On September 27, 1988, the station changed its call sign to KALY. From 1983 to 2003, it had broadcast Spanish-language programming. In mid-February 2003, the station became a Radio Disney network affiliate, airing a children's/contemporary hit radio format.

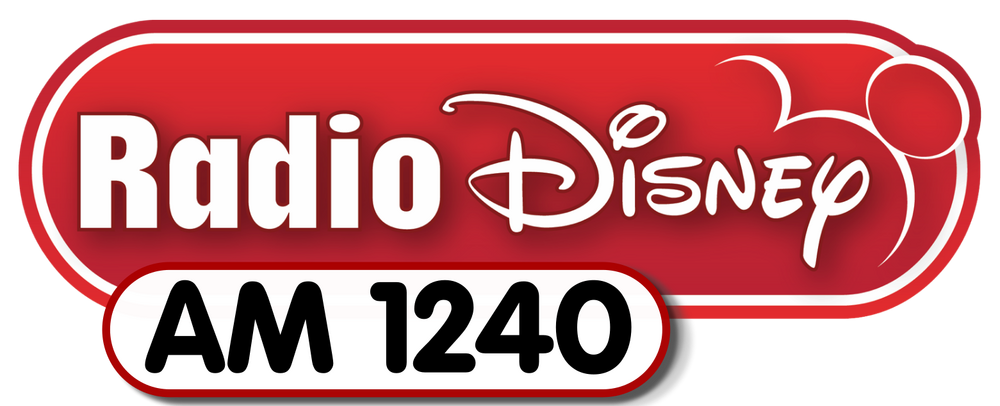
Final Radio Disney logo for KALY.

The Walt Disney Company took then KALY, and five other stations slated to be sold, off the air on January 22, 2010. In late 2010, the Jennifer Smart Foundation purchased the station from Disney for the JENNiRADIO format with station profits being donated to other charities. The station was back on the air with JENNiRADIO format on December 18.

=== KDSK ===
On October 16, 2012, Derek Underhill's KD Radio, Inc. consummated the purchase of KALY at a price of $225,000. The station flipped call letters to KDSK on March 8, 2013. The JENNiRADIO format would later move to KJNI-LP in Lake Elsinore, California in 2014.

Through Learfield Sports, New Mexico State University football and basketball were broadcasting on KDSK for the 2015–16 season.

=== FM Translator ===
An application to modify a construction permit for a new FM translator station broadcasting on 93.7 as K229CL was filed to give this station an FM signal in Albuquerque. The translator signed on July 12, 2014, at 40 watts from atop Sandia Crest. On March 30, 2015, the translator was upgraded from 40 watts to 250 watts with the antenna pattern directed at the city, greatly improving the signal. On February 16, 2016, KD Radio was granted a construction permit to move translator K297BG (then on 107.3 FM) out of Grants, New Mexico to Rio Rancho while also moving the frequency to 92.9 FM. It was stated on the FCC application that once 92.9 is in operation KDSK will discontinue broadcast on 93.7, which is owned by Telebeeper of New Mexico. On August 29, KDSK began broadcasting on 92.9. Broadcast on 93.7 ceased in late September and the translator is currently off the air.

Call sign	Frequency	City of license	FID	ERP (W)	Class	FCC info
K225CH	92.9 FM	Rio Rancho, New Mexico	79321	250	D	LMS

== Notable Radio Personality's Deaths ==
=== Dj Donn Webb (1943–2023) ===
In February 2023 KDSK announced the death of long-time DJ, Donn Webb who died at age 79. Don was well known and well liked by the listeners having been a KDSK radio personality for almost 20 years. Prior to his passing Donn graciously donated his lifetime collection of music, photos with musicians and memorabilia to New Mexico State University in 2021.
