= KEMR (AM) =

- Moriarty, New Mexico; United States
- Frequency: 1080 kHz
- Branding: East Mountain Radio 102.1

Programming
- Format: Classic hits/Oldies

Ownership
- Owner: Don Davis

History
- First air date: 1989 (as KOFK at 1100)
- Former call signs: KOFK (1985–1995); KCIB (1995–2000); KQEO (2000); KZKL (2000–2002); KRKE (2002–2005); KQNM (2005–2008); KKJY (2008–2009); KIVA (2009); KQNM (2009–2015); KRKE (2015–2017); KSFE (2017–2019); KMYN (2019)
- Former frequencies: 1100 kHz (1985–2013); 1090 kHz (2013–2021)
- Call sign meaning: East Mountain Radio

Technical information
- Licensing authority: FCC
- Facility ID: 22391
- Class: D
- Power: 250 watts (day)
- Transmitter coordinates: 35°9′5″N 107°52′34″W
- Translator: (102.1 MHz) K271DC (Moriarty)

Links
- Public license information: Public file; LMS

KEMR (1080 AM) is a radio station licensed to serve Moriarty, New Mexico, United States. It is owned by long-time Albuquerque broadcaster Don Davis. KEMR airs a format featuring classic hits on weekdays and oldies on weekends along with community information and local weather reports. KEMR is also broadcast on FM translator K271DC 102.1 MHz at 99 watts atop Sandia Crest with an eastward directional antenna.

The station was assigned the KQNM call sign by the Federal Communications Commission on May 18, 2009. On September 22, 2015, the KQNM call letters were moved to 1550 in Albuquerque with 1090 picking up the KRKE callsign previously held by that station. On November 1, 2017, the KRKE call letters were transferred to 101.3 in Albuquerque with 1090 picking up the KSFE call sign.

The station filed an application to move from 1090 kHz to 1080 kHz and move the station from Milan, New Mexico to Moriarty, New Mexico and was granted a construction permit for the move on September 20, 2017. The license to cover the new location was issued on June 15, 2021.

The station changed its call sign to KMYN on March 7, 2019, then again to KEMR on April 9, 2019.

On January 3, 2022, the station filed a silent notification stating that the station would be off the air while the FM translator K271DC would be moved from the AM broadcasting tower to a new site. Broadcasts for both signals would commence in mid-July 2022.

On June 3, 2022, it was announced that the station was sold to local broadcaster Don Davis for $10. The sale was approved by the FCC on October 5, 2023.
