= KIVA (AM) =

Talk radio station in Albuquerque, New Mexico

- Albuquerque, New Mexico; United States
- Broadcast area: Albuquerque metropolitan area
- Frequency: 1600 kHz
- Branding: AM 1600 KIVA

Programming
- Format: talk radio
- Affiliations: Premiere Networks; Westwood One

Ownership
- Owner: Rock of Talk LLC

History
- First air date: June 6, 1956
- Former call signs: KHAM (1956–1961); KRAZ (1961–1962); KRZY (1962–1964); KLOS (1964–1968); KZIA (1968–1988); KNUS (1988–1989); KZKL (1989–1993); KRLL (1993–1995); KNOS (1995–1996); KZKL (1996–1997); KDZZ (1997–1999); KIVA (1999–2002); KANM (2002–2005); KRKE (2005–2012)

Technical information
- Licensing authority: FCC
- Facility ID: 65257
- Class: D
- Power: 10,000 watts (day); 175 watts (night)
- Transmitter coordinates: 35°03′4.2″N 106°38′36.1″W

Links
- Public license information: Public file; LMS
- Website: rockoftalk.com

KIVA (1600 kHz) is a 10,000 watt commercial radio station licensed to Albuquerque, New Mexico, owned by the Rock of Talk, LLC. The station airs the Premiere Networks talk lineup, and also various local programming. Its studios and offices are located on Renard Place Southeast, near the Albuquerque International Sunport.

KIVA broadcasts with 10,000 watts by day, to protect other stations on 1600 AM at night, it reduces power to 175 watts. The station's transmitter is located on Arno Street, near Interstate 25.

== Programming ==
On weekdays, KIVA carries mostly nationally syndicated conservative talk shows. They include Glenn Beck, Bill O'Reilly, Sean Hannity, Jesse Kelly, Buck Sexton and Coast to Coast AM with George Noory. In January 2025, KIVA also added Michael DelGiorno to its morning broadcast schedule. He airs during the early morning hours from 4-7am MT, weekdays. KIVA also features a fan favorite local afternoon talk show, The Rock of Talk with Eddy Aragon from 4:00 to 6:45 pm weekdays. Aragon was the 2021 republican candidate for Albuquerque mayor and was named the Albuquerque Journal's "radio personality of the year" from 2017 to 2020. Aragon often says you're "in the KIVA" referencing the station's call letters meaning of kiva, a Native American dwelling used for political meetings.

Weekend hosts include Bill Handel and "Ground Zero with Clyde Lewis." Saturdays are dedicated to business talk with local broadcasts from 10:00 am to 5:00 pm. Syndicated Pink Floyd program Floydian Slip airs Saturdays at 7 pm. On Sundays, Christian talk and teaching programs including Hometown Heroes and The Lutheran Hour as well as Free Talk Live air Sunday evenings.

== History ==
The station first signed on as KHAM on June 6, 1956. It originally was a daytimer on AM 1580, required to go off the air at sunset to avoid interfering with other stations.

It had a classic country format as KRLL from 1993 to 1995, and was the home of Radio Disney as KDZZ from October 1997 to July 1999, but for many years was an AM simulcast for oldies station "Kool 102" KZKL-FM 101.7.

In 2000, the Federal Communications Commission authorized the station to move from AM 1580, a Canadian clear channel frequency where the Albuquerque station could not broadcast at night, to AM 1600, a regional frequency which would allow it to broadcast around the clock. The station switched to an all news radio format as KIVA from 2000 to 2002, after the frequency switch. From 2002 to 2004, it was "The mix of New Mexico" as KANM. In early 2005, 1600 began an oldies format as KRKE, after stunting with an all Elvis Presley format for a couple of weeks at the end of 2004. The talk format for KIVA began on June 15, 2009, on 1550 AM. On August 28, 2012, KIVA swapped frequencies with KRKE moving KIVA to 1600, while KRKE switched from 1600 to 1550.

The station was assigned the call sign KNUS on November 5, 1988. On September 27, 1989, the station changed its call sign to KZKL, on November 1, 1993, to KRLL, on November 1, 1995, to KNOS, on June 14, 1996, to KZKL, on November 28, 1997, to KDZZ, on September 13, 1999, to KIVA, on October 22, 2002, to KANM, on April 1, 2005, to KRKE, and on August 28, 2012, to the current KIVA.

== FM broadcast and present ==
KIVA first began broadcasting in June 2013 on FM translator station 95.9 FM in Albuquerque. In March 2017, KIVA began broadcasting on K229CL 93.7 which had previously aired 1240 KDSK (AM) until it moved to 92.9.

In April 2017, 95.9 FM ceased broadcast. A recent FCC filing states that the new owner (Telebeeper of New Mexico) is negotiating with another station for rebroadcast on the translator.

Today, KIVA continues to be heard on 10,000 watt AM powerhouse 1600 in the Albuquerque metro and worldwide via their apps and website with a large and loyal listener base. KIVA is the only home to the Premiere Networks talk lineup in the Albuquerque radio market (market 70 out of 246), featuring talkers Glenn Beck, Jesse Kelly, Bill O'Reilly, Sean Hannity, Michael DelGiorno, Buck Sexton and Coast to Coast AM with George Noory. As of January 2025, the station also airs a video version of their popular local show "The Rock of Talk" on a separate app called "Rock of Talk TV" for both android and iOS users. The station is voiced by Aaron Bradley.
