= 2017 in radio =

The following is a list of events affecting radio broadcasting in 2017. Events listed include radio program debuts, finales, cancellations, and station launches, closures and format changes, as well as information about controversies.

== Notable events ==
=== January ===
| Date | Event |
|---|---|
| 1 | After a nearly two-year run with Active Rock, WBGF Belle Glade, Florida/West Palm Beach flipped to Oldies, a move that also ends its affiliation with Bubba the Love Sponge's syndicated morning program in the market. |
| 2 | KJWL Fresno makes the flip to Top 40/CHR, filling the void that has been left open for nearly 10 years as well as new competition for Rhythmic rivals KBOS-FM and KSEQ. KJWL's Adult Album Alternative format adjusts to Soft AC and moves over to sister station KJZN, effectively dropping their Classic Hip-Hop format after nearly two years. |
| 2 | After a six-month run with Dance/Rhythmic Top 40, only to see its sale to new owners fall through due to financial problems, WZDJ Fernandina Beach, Florida/Jacksonville flips to Country under the original ownership for the time being. |
| 3 | Entercom splits up the Active Rock simulcast of Boston's WAAF Westborough, Massachusetts and WKAF Brockton, Massachusetts, with the latter flipping to Urban AC as "The New 97.7", returning the format to the market for the first time since 2006, when Entercom bought then-WILD-FM from Radio One and flipped it to the WAAF simulcast. |
| 5 | After a 13-year run with both a Rhythmic and Mainstream Top 40/CHR direction (under the "Wired" and "AMP" brandings), CBS Radio's WZMP Philadelphia flipped to AC as "Today's 96.5", with the station now positioned as a flanker for Classic Hits sister WOGL and compete against Hot AC WISX and the top-rated AC WBEB. |
| 5 | Radio One's Cincinnati outlets WOSL and WDBZ/W268DM make format changes. WOSL shifts from Urban Oldies to Urban AC as "100.3 R&B", while the former format replaces WDBZ's Gospel presentation, branded as "Soul 101.5 & 1230." |
| 5 | After stunting with Christmas music, and afterwards with a Donald Trump-themed presentation, WBRN-FM Tampa flipped to AC as "B98.7." The station will take on the Cox Media Group siblings of Mainstream AC WWRM and Soft AC WDUV. |
| 5 | Just six days after KKHH Houston flipped to Adult Hits, Radio One dropped KROI's pioneering Classic Hip-Hop presentation to pick up the Top 40/CHR format KKHH dropped, billing itself as "92.1 Radio NOW." |
| 18 | Redding, California picked up its second Rhythmic Top 40, as KQMS-FM dropped its simulcast of its News/Talk sister and became "Wild 99.3", using the new calls KWLZ. |
| 19 | KFTE Abbeville, Louisiana shifts from Active rock "Planet Radio" to Classic rock with the branding "Classic Rock 105.1." |
| 25 | The Top 40 battle in Salt Lake City increased to four, as KENZ dropped Classic Hip-Hop and launches as "Power 94.9". The flip brings the format back to the 94.9 frequency for the first time in 13 years, as it was the former home of one of the two Mainstream Top 40/CHRs it will take on, KZHT. |
| 30 | CKBD-FM Lethbridge, Alberta flips from Modern rock to Modern AC while retaining their "Bridge" branding. |

=== February ===
| Date | Event |
|---|---|
| 1 | Citing a lack of available progressive talk programs for syndication, WNYY Ithaca, New York drops the longtime progressive talk radio format it has held for 12 years and return to its previous oldies format. |
| 1 | In Milwaukee, Michael Crute, the host of the syndicated Devil's Advocate Radio, purchases ESPN Deportes affiliate WRRD and converts it to the first progressive talk radio station in the market. |
| 1 | After a 24-year run in both mornings and up until January 27 in afternoons, Bobby Rich is released by AC KMXZ-FM Tucson after he made comments during his program that station management saw as offensive but didn't specify, for which Rich apologized on his Facebook page. |
| 1 | Buck Sexton replaces Meghan McCain as host of Premiere Networks' evening program, America Now. The move presumably ends his existing program on TheBlaze Radio Network. |
| 1 | CJXL-FM Moncton, New Brunswick rebrands from XL96 to New Country 96.9 but continues with the country music format. CKCH-FM in Sydney, Nova Scotia and CIGV-FM in Penticton, British Columbia also picked up the "New Country" branding. |
| 2 | CBS Corporation unveiled plans to merge its CBS Radio division with Philadelphia-based Entercom, giving that company 244 stations and national reach across major markets, including CBS Sports Radio and News Radio, in a tax-free deal to CBS shareholders through a complex process known as a reverse Morris trust, which begins with an offer to existing CBS Corp. shareholders to exchange their stock for shares in Entercom. The enlarged company will take the Entercom name. The deal however will also see CBS and Entercom spinning off stations in Los Angeles (one FM), San Francisco (four FMs, including San Jose), Boston (three FMs), Seattle (two FMs), Sacramento (four FMs), and San Diego (two FMs) |
| 13 | KTSR Lake Charles, Louisiana drops Top 40/CHR for Classic Rock. |
| 17 | CFJL-FM Winnipeg drops AC for 1990s' Hits as "Hot 100.5" |
| 21 | Due to having flipped sister station WXZX from Alternative to Sports and moving Fox Sports Radio programming to the aforementioned outlet, WYTS/W287CP Columbus, Ohio flips to Urban AC as "Vibe 105.3." |
| 24 | Top 40/CHR CHBN-FM Edmonton retired "The Bounce" moniker after 13 years, as it rebrands to parent owner Rogers Media's "Kiss" moniker. |

=== March ===
| Date | Event |
|---|---|
| 1 | WRSJ in San Juan, Puerto Rico switched from a Tiva TV simulcast to a News radio format, to become "IBC News Network", broadcasting international news around the clock, with an alliance between International Broadcasting Corporation, France 24 & VOA News. |
| 1 | Wifredo G. Blanco Pi, the owner of radio stations WAPA in San Juan, WISO in Ponce, WVOZ in Morovis and WGYA in Guayama acquires WMIA in Arecibo for $250,000. The regular programming continued until transaction closes and was completed on April 14, 2017. Beginning on May 1, WMIA will become a repeater of the "WAPA Radio" News Network, covering across the island. |
| 2 | Riverside–San Bernardino picks up a R&B/Hip-Hop outlet, as KDEY-FM breaks away from its simulcast of Classic Hip-Hop sibling KDAY to become "Wild 93.5." The "Wild" brand was last used at KRQB from 2004 to 2007. |
| 6 | Springfield, Illinois becomes the latest market to pick up a Hot AC outlet, as WXAJ drops Top 40/CHR to become "99.7 THE MIX". The switch puts it in direct competition with WNNS. |
| 7 | KURK Reno ends its run with Mainstream Rock, as it flips to AC as "Fun 101" and changes calls to KRFN. The move puts them in competition with rival KRNO for listeners. |
| 17 | Eau Claire, Wisconsin becomes the latest market to pick up a Rhythmic Top 40 format, as WEAQ drops Oldies to become "95.9 Jamz" (utilizing the FM translator W240DC Chippewa Falls) to counter iHeartMedia's Top 40/CHR rival WBIZ-FM while serving as a flanker for Adult Top 40 sibling WIAL and Country sister WAXX. |
| 24 | After three years as Nash Icon station, WZAT Savannah flipped to Adult Top 40 as "102.1 The Sound." The flip brings the format back to WZAT, having utilized it from 2008 to 2010 when it was "Z102" after transitioning from Top 40/CHR. |
| 24 | FM translator K242CC/Austin, Texas moves frequencies from 96.3 MHz to 95.9 MHz, becoming "95.9 RnB" while keeping its urban adult contemporary format. The call letters also changed to K240EL. The reason for the frequency switch was to eliminate interference with KGID/Giddings, Texas, also on 96.3 MHz. |
| 30 | Citing tough competition to attract American advertisers, Bell Media announced that it would close the US-based sales office of Alternative CIMX-FM Windsor, Ontario, Canada, which is based in Bingham Farms, Michigan; the station covers the Detroit market. It also canceled CIMX-FM's morning show "Cal & Co.", and laid off around a dozen people as part of a restructuring of its Windsor cluster. Despite the changes, CIMX-FM and its sister stations will retain their respective formats. |

=== April ===
| Date | Event |
|---|---|
| 1 | WBYM in Bayamón switches from Spanish Variety to Jazz, becoming the third radio station broadcasting Jazz in Puerto Rico (the others are WVID in Añasco and WIPR-FMHD2 in San Juan). Also it would drop the "Metro Radio" moniker after two years under a time brokerage agreement with Juan Papotito Rosario (owners of WJIT "Radio Hit" in Vega Alta and WOLA "Radio Procer" in Barranquitas) and replaced by "Radio Jazz 1560". Also it seeks to reacquire the station from the IBC Divestiture Trust to International Broadcasting Corporation. |
| 1 | Two Puerto rican radio companies, International Broadcasting Corporation and RAAD Broadcasting Corporation now operates under a Joint sales agreement on radio stations WIOA "Fresh" (99.9 FM) in San Juan, WXYX "La X" (100.7 FM) in Bayamón, WQBS "Mix" (107.7 FM) in Carolina, WIOC "Fresh" (105.1 FM) in Ponce, WXHD "La X" (98.1 FM) in Santa Isabel, WELX "La X" (101.5 FM) in Isabela, Puerto Rico and WXLX "La X" (103.7 FM) in Lajas, Also the stations offering radio products including its AiLive and La X Radio Visual mobile apps, and digital platforms under the alliance. Also on April 22, WXLX becomes the repeater of the "Fresh" CHR radio network. |
| 3 | The competition among Rock-formatted stations in Sacramento is about to increase to three, as iHeartMedia's KQJK announced that they're dropping the "Jack FM" Adult Hits format to become "93.7 The River." The move brings the format back to the station after 11 years, when it was Classic Alternative. |
| 17 | After a five-year stint with Alternative rock, WJSE reverts to Classic Hits as "106.3 The Shore." |
| 17 | After 30 years with Country, WHLZ Florence, South Carolina flips to Adult Top 40 as "Q100.5", and takes the new calls WQPD. The flip puts the station, once known as "Wheelz 92.5" (later "Wheelz 100.5" in 2003 after the 92.5 frequency was relocated to Charleston) and previously "100.5 Nash FM" after parent owner Cumulus Media's rebranding of its Country outlets in 2013, up against iHeart Media Top 40/CHR WJMX-FM and rival Adult Top 40 WSIM. |
| 19-21 | A series of format flips takes place in San Antonio. On April 19, iHeartMedia's KZEP-FM dropped Rhythmic Top 40 to become Spanish Top 40 "104.5 Latino Hits" at 5:30 PM (CDT), which was moved up by a day after rival Univision countered that upon learning of the flip by dropping KMYO's Classic Hip-Hop format to return to the aforementioned format after it was dropped in December 2014 and reclaimed its "95.1 Latino Mix" branding by launching it in response at 5PM (CDT). The flip of the two stations paved the way for Alpha Media's KTFM-HD2/K277CX to drop Alternative "103.3 The App" to pick up the Classic Hip-Hop format that was dropped by KMYO, launching as "G103.3." The flip also comes as the ratings for the Alternative format failed to attract listeners, posting a 0.8 in the March 2017 Nielsen Audio book. |
| 20 | Radio One acquires ESPN Radio affiliates WWXT Prince Frederick, Maryland and WXGI Richmond from Red Zebra Broadcasting. WWXT will become a simulcast of Urban AC WMMJ (Washington, D.C.) on May 1, while WXGI will retain their current format and simulcast sister station WTPS/W274BX under the "Richmond ESPN Radio" branding. |
| 25 | Newcap Radio plans to sell CISL Vancouver, British Columbia to Rogers Media which in turn plans to rebrand that station to sports radio as Sportsnet 650 in the fall. This comes as Rogers Media gained full acquisition as part of an agreement in conjunction with the Vancouver Canucks games previously broadcast by Bell Media's CFTE and CKST. |
| 26 | Lansing, Michigan picks up a second Top 40/CHR, as WLMI dropped Classic Hits to become "i92.9." The flip will give rival WJIM-FM new competition for listeners |
| 26 | WSNE-FM in Taunton, Massachusetts tweaks its format from adult top 40 to a rhythmic adult contemporary-leaning hot adult contemporary station, while sticking with the "Coast 93.3" moniker and changing its slogan from "Southern New England's Hit Music Station" to "Throwbacks and Hits from the 90s, 2000s and Today". Additionally, WSNE dropped the syndicated shows Most Requested Live and Club Kane (which were made with contemporary hit radio stations in mind) to local programming in order to match the new, more gold-heavy hot AC format. |

=== May ===
| Date | Event |
|---|---|
| 1 | Amarillo picks up a Rhythmic Hot AC as KQFX debuts "Wild 104.3." The station will challenge Rhythmic Top 40 rival KQIZ-FM and Top 40/CHR KXSS-FM for listeners in the North Texas market. |
| 5 | After a 4-year run with AC, iHeartMedia's WLQB Ocean Isle Beach, North Carolina (serving Myrtle Beach, South Carolina) flips back to Regional Mexican as "El Patron 93.5." Prior to its flip to AC, it was previously known as "La Que Buena" under original owners Qantum Communications from 2005 to 2013. |
| 9 | After 32 years of ownership, Emmis Broadcasting sells Rhythmic Top 40 KPWR Los Angeles to an affiliate of The Meruelo Group for $82.75 million. The announcement comes after Emmis, who exits the nation's second-largest radio market, made a deal in April with its lenders to seek $80 million worth of divestments by January 2018 to amend its credit agreement. As part of the deal, Meruelo will begin operating KPWR via LMA following the expiration or early termination of the waiting period under the Hart-Scott-Rodino Antitrust Improvements Act. KPWR will now be paired with Classic Hip-Hop KDAY and Riverside-San Bernardino targeted Rhythmic Top 40 KDEY-FM effective with the deal. |
| 10 | Morgan Murphy Media acquires CBS affiliate KOAM-TV Pittsburg, Kansas and ABC primary affiliate KAVU/Victoria, Texas (including its CBS, NBC, and Univision subchannel/LD-TV outlets) from Saga Communications, who is exiting the television business to focus on its radio outlets, in a $66.6 million deal, which includes an option to acquire Surtsey Media's Fox affiliate KFJX Joplin, Missouri and KAVU LMA partner, SagamoreHill Broadcasting's Fox affiliate KVCT, which Saga operates. Saga will use the sale of the television assets to acquire stations from Apex Media, who is selling their radio stations in Charleston (WCKN, WMXZ, WXST, WAVF and WSPO/W257BQ/W261DG) and Hilton Head Island, South Carolina (WVSC, W256CB/106.5 W293BZ/WVSC-HD2, WLHH, and WALI), but will keep WALJ in Tuscaloosa. |
| 11 | Newcap Radio acquires three radio stations in Kamloops, British Columbia CKRV-FM, CJKC-FM & CHNL. |
| 19 | JVC Media completed its sale of Oldies WBGF Belle Glade, Florida/West Palm Beach to ANCO Media Group; on August 7, JVC moved the Oldies format to WSVU (replacing its adult standards format), as WBGF (currently in the process of a signal upgrade upon approval from the FCC) flipped to Dance and adopted the "Revolution 93.5" branding to mirror South Florida simulcast sister WZFL-W228BV-W228BY/WHYI-FM HD2. |
| 26 | For the first time since it flipped from Top 40/CHR to Modern AC in 2004, KQKQ-FM Council Bluffs–Omaha brings back the heritage "Sweet 98.5" moniker, this time repositioning as "Omaha's Sweetest Variety" due to its shift to a more current-based Adult Top 40 presentation as opposed to a Mainstream Top 40 direction utilized during the first incarnation of the "Sweet" branding. |
| 26 | Another familiar radio moniker returns as well, this time in St. Louis, where at 10:37 AM (CDT) iHeart Media flipped KLOU-HD2/W279AQ from Christian Contemporary as "UP! 103.7" after 17 months to Urban AC as "Majic 103.7." The flip brings the branding back into the iHeart St. Louis roster, where it had history that began in 1979 at 107.7 before moving to 104.9 in 1997 and then to 100.3 in 2012 until its flip to Classic Hip-Hop in November 2014, and where the current KMJM calls reside. |
| 26 | iHeartMedia also makes changes in Jacksonville and Detroit, where both "Jack FM" branded WWJK and Mainstream Rock WDTW-FM shift to Variety Hits. WWJK adopts "107.3 The River" for its branding, while WDTW retains "106.7 The D" for theirs. |
| 26 | In Nashville, WPRT-FM HD2/W271AB drops Urban Gospel (and after five days of stunting with "Macarena" by Los Del Rio) for R&B Oldies, branding itself as "102.1 The Ville." |

=== June ===
| Date | Event |
|---|---|
| 2 | KCCT Corpus Christi drops its Americana/Texas Country format for rhythmic-leaning classic hits as "Retro 104.1", going up against the more traditional rival in the format, KMXR. |
| 5 | KFLY Eugene drops its AAA after two years for country as "US 101". The new station will have a battle between long-dominant KBUL-FM. |
| 9 | Los Angeles adds another Country outlet, as Pasadena-licensed Radio Disney flagship KDIS changed call letters to KRDC and flipped to a country format as "Radio Disney Country", becoming the first terrestrial radio station carrying the formerly online-only platform. KRDC also added a translator, 99.1 K256CX, which broadcasts from KRDC's transmitter in Irwindale. The children's radio/contemporary hit radio hybrid continues in the market on KRTH's HD2 subchannel. The move also officially ends Radio Disney's coverage on analog AM/FM radio. |
| 12 | Univision sells one of its Phoenix rimshots, KKMR Arizona City, Arizona (a simulcast of Spanish AC KOMR Sun City), to Educational Media Foundation. KOMR will become an Air1 station and part of a simulcast with KZAI Superior, K243BN Laveen, and KESZ-HD3/Phoenix. |
| 14 | Univision sells its Albuquerque/Santa Fe radio cluster of Rhythmic Top 40 KKSS, Classic Rock KIOT, and Classic Hip-Hop KKRG to American General Media, who in turn will divest the following properties to comply with FCC ownership rules to new owners: Classical KHFM to KHFM Community Partners, who will convert the station to non-commercial status, Modern AC KAGM to VCY America, who will also convert to non-commercial and drop the format for Religious programming, and Top 40/CHR KDLW to BB Broadcasting. AGM will also acquire and sell Univision's Regional Mexican KJFA-FM to Vanguard Media. |
| 15 | Ft. Myers picks up a new competitor for Rhythmic Top 40 WBTT, as WLVO changed their format from Spanish Christian (due to its sale to Sun Broadcasting) to urban contemporary, branded as "Fly 98.5" under new WFFY calls. |
| 19 | Cumulus Media shuffles the formats of its New Orleans outlets, as Alternative WZRH and Nash FM-formatted Adult-leaning Country WRKN swap frequencies. WZRH moved to 92.3 and rebrands as "ALT 92.3", while WRKN takes over the 106.1 signal and moves from a recurrent-focused approach to a current-based direction. |
| 21 | In a three-way swap, WTIL 1300 AM "Radio Util" in Mayagüez sells for a transaction from La Mas Z Radio to Wifredo G. Blanco Pi, WBYM 1560 AM "Radio Jazz" in Bayamón acquires the station from IBC Divestiture Trust to La Mas Z Radio, and also involves International Broadcasting Corporation, receiving land and equipment at the site of WAPA 680 AM in Carolina, PR from Blanco Pi and permission to relocate WGIT "Faro de Santidad" 1660 AM in Canóvanas to that site and build a transmitter building, and IBC may sell or rent at $600 a month the WBYM transmitter site to La Mas Z Radio. The swap of WBYM and WTIL was completed on August 15. |
| 26 | Summit Media pulls the plug on Top 40/CHR W261CL & WURV-HD2 Richmond and redirected its listeners to Adult Top 40 sister WURV after six years (it originally launched as a Rhythmic at 100.9 before relocating in 2014). On June 27, the station flipped to Sports, giving Richmond its third outlet with the format, joining Fox Sports Radio affiliate WRNL and the ESPN Radio simulcasts of WXGL/W274BX. |
| 26 | After a year of programming a Mainstream Rock format, WUSH-HD2 & W243DJ Poquoson/Norfolk (serving the Hampton Roads area) flipped to soft oldies, branded as "Vintage 96.5"; unfortunately, the station dropped the format on September 15 for Sports. |
| 26 | Classic Hits KOOI (Jacksonville/Tyler/Longview, Texas) changed their format after nearly 3 years to current-leaning variety hits, branded as "106.5 Jack FM". |
| 26 | iHeartMedia pulls the plug on another "UP!" branded Christian Contemporary outlet, as K297AK & KXBG-HD2 Loveland, Colorado begins stunting with Christmas music. On June 30, the station flipped to iHeartRadio's All-90s format. |
| 26 | University of Massachusetts Dartmouth's WUMD signs off at Noon following selling the station to Rhode Island Public Radio. The 89.3 license is moved to Newport, Rhode Island to relay the public radio network whilst WUMD transitions to online-only broadcasting. |
| 27 | St. Cloud, Minnesota picks up a Classic Hits outlet, as KZRV drops Active Rock "Rev 96.7" after nearly 10 years to become "96.7 The River." |
| 28 | Amarillo sees another station make a format change, as KPRF drops Variety Hits "98.7 Jack FM" after nearly 10 years and began stunting with random current hits from various music genres. On June 30, KPRF flipped to Classic Rock, branding as "Lonestar 98.7." |
| 29 | Adult Top 40 WISX Philadelphia drops the format after nearly seven years and flips to a more classic hip hop-leaning Rhythmic AC format as "Real 106.1". In response to the change, Mario Lopez and Ryan Seacrest left the station, but Chio continues as morning host. The flip returns the latter format to the market for the first time since 2010, when WISX evolved to its now-defunct Adult Top 40 format; in addition, the classic hip hop format makes a comeback for the first time since the previous September, when WPHI-FM swapped frequencies with WPPZ and shifted to urban. |
| 30 | San Antonio sees yet another station shakeup, as iHeartMedia's Top 40/CHR KXXM drops "Mix 96.1" for "96.1 NOW." The move brings the formerly Adult-skewed station to a more current direction closer to Rhythmic-leaning rival KTFM. |
| 30 | iHeartMedia also shifts its Adult Alternative-leaning Modern Hot AC WDVI Rochester, New York to Adult Top 40, returning to a brand it used 11 years prior as "Mix 100.5." |
| 30 | iHeartMedia also pulls the plug on Oldies WDIZ/W242BF Panama City, Florida, as that station flips to Active Rock as "96 Rock." |
| 30 | The University of Massachusetts Dartmouth's radio station WUMD signs off after 42 years, transitioning to online-only broadcasting. The station's license is bought by Rhode Island Public Radio, which changes the station to WXNI to rebroadcast their feed, and changes the community of license to Newport, Rhode Island. |
| 30 | Providence, Rhode Island CCM WSTL/W229AN leaves the air. |

=== July ===
| Date | Event |
|---|---|
| 1 | Ackley Media Group shuffles the formats of its US Virgin Islands outlets, as American CHR WIVI and Urban Contemporary WWKS swap frequencies. WIVI moved to 101.3 and rebrands as "Pirate Radio 101.3," while WWKS takes over the 96.1 signal and moves from a recurrent-focused approach to a current-based direction, rebranded as "Kiss 96.1". |
| 3 | A swap takes places in Branson, Missouri, as siblings KRZK and KCAX/K251BX exchange formats. KRZK takes back its Classic Country format after having dropping it for News/Talk in 2012 from KCAX, who picks up KRZK's Classic Hits format. |
| 3 | Bloomberg Radio makes changes among its Boston affiliations, as WRCA/W291CZ is announced as the new affiliate; current affiliate WXKS/WJMN-HD2 will continue carrying the network until a new format is announced. |
| 6 | SiriusXM announced that it has fired Faction Talk personality Gregg "Opie" Hughes after it was learned that he recorded "a video made of an employee using the [SiriusXM studios'] bathroom." In a statement about the action that led to Hughes' dismissal: "SiriusXM confirms it has terminated its relationship with Gregg ‘Opie’ Hughes, host of the ‘Opie Radio Show’ weekday afternoons on the Faction Talk channel. SiriusXM does not publicly discuss internal personnel issues." The firing on this date incidentally comes on the third anniversary of the firing of Hughes' former "Opie and Anthony" co-host Anthony Cumia, who was terminated for a series of racially charged derogatory and inflammatory tweets. |
| 7 | Newcap Radio rebrands eight radio stations in rural Alberta to the Boom FM branding and rebrands CFXE-FM and its rebroadcasters CFXH-FM, CFXP-FM & CFXG to the "Real Country" branding. |
| 10 | Just seven years after a frequency move from 100.7 to 100.3 and after flipping to Classic Rock in 2013, WYDL Middleton, Tennessee (serving Corinth, Mississippi) returned to Top 40/CHR, branded as "Hot 100". |
| 10 | Just nearly three months after The Benns Family announced that it was preparing to sign off and turn its license back in to the FCC after 56 years of ownership, Southern Gospel WFLI Lookout Mountain/Chattanooga, Tennessee was sold and return to the air with Conservative Talk. |
| 10 | Another Amarillo station flips formats, as KBZD changed their format from Adult Top 40 to a simulcast of religious-formatted KRBG Umbarger, Texas. |
| 19 | Northern Kentucky University announced that it has sold WNKN Middletown, Ohio (whose signal covers both Cincinnati and Dayton at 105.9) to Grant County Broadcasting, who plans to convert the station back to commercial status after six years. The sale mark NKU's exit from broadcasting due to budget cuts and potential loss of funding for colleges and universities from the Commonwealth of Kentucky. NKU had already sold flagship WNKU Highland Heights, Kentucky (serving Cincinnati) to Bible Broadcasting and WNKE New Boston, Ohio (serving southeastern Ohio and northeastern Kentucky) to Educational Media Foundation in February. |
| 24 | Broadcasting & Programming Systems sells one of its Puerto Rico's Rock stations, WCAD "Alfa Rock" San Juan, to Educational Media Foundation. Alfa Rock's programming remains on the air until mid-September. Alfa Rock signs off on March 3, 2018, at 12:06 AM. WCAD will become a K-Love station serving the entire island beginning in October 2018. |
| 24 | After a year of AC, KXSN San Diego flips to Classic Hits, but retains its "Sunny 98.1" moniker. The move ends the competition it had with KYXY, who will become KXSN's sister station when the CBS/Entercom merger becomes final. |
| 27 | After seven years as morning host, Carson Daly announced that he is vacating that position at Top 40/CHR KAMP-FM Los Angeles effective immediately so he can spend more time with his family and focus on his television duties. He'll still serve as host of the weekly syndicated Top 40 countdown radio program The Daly Download, which will continue to air and is produced at KAMP-FM, which is the flagship station for the show. |
| 31 | Just seven years after flipping to Sports, WNMQ Columbus, Mississippi returned top Top 40/CHR and revived its "Q103.1" moniker. The Sports format continues on its AM sister. |

=== August ===
| Date | Event |
|---|---|
| 1 | Reno sees more changes take place, as Shamrock Communications exits the market. The company has sold Alternative KRZQ (licensed to Fallon, Nevada) to Bighorn Media, who in turn flips its format to Gold-based AC as "Easy 104.1" and utilizing the new calls KUEZ. The remaining properties in the cluster, Active Rock KZTI (licensed to Fallon Station, Nevada) Top 40/CHR KWNZ (licensed to Lovelock, Nevada) and Conservative Talk KNEZ (licensed to Hazen, Nevada) are being sold to Radio Lazer, who will now have a cluster of four FMs serving Reno. |
| 1 | Tulsa's KBEZ drops its "Bob FM" branding and relaunches as "92.9 The Drive." |
| 2 | A major shuffling takes place in Roswell, New Mexico. Majestic Broadcasting's KBCQ/K223BH swapped places with sister KSFX, with the latter keeping their Classic Rock format and the KSFX calls (that will now replace the KBCQ calls), while the former dropped Classic Hits for AC and relaunches as "100.5 Kool FM" and changes call letters to KZDB. |
| 3 | Major changes at WAPA Radio, as WGYA/1590 in Guayama changed its historical call letters to WXRF. Also, WTIL/1300 in Mayagüez switched its Spanish Oldies format to News Talk as the newest member of the WAPA Radio News Network. |
| 3 | CJCS Stratford, Ontario abandons its 1240 AM frequency and makes its move to the FM band as "107.1 Juice FM" with a variety hits format while retaining the slogan "Stratford's Greatest Hits", becoming the latest radio station owned by Vista Radio to take on the "Juice" branding. |
| 7 | After 10 years of Talk, WNNH Henniker/Concord, New Hampshire returned to its previous Oldies format, which they programmed from its 1989 sign-on until their flip to the aforementioned format in 2007. The move was made due to parent owner Binnie Media taking over operations of rival WTPL Hillsboro via a LMA |
| 7 | Corpus Christi picked up a fourth Top 40, as former ESPN Radio affiliate KLHB launches as "Wild 105.5." The station had debuted with a Mainstream direction, only to quickly segue to a Rhythmic direction, giving KZFM and R&B/Hip-Hop KNDA new competition, along with challenging Mainstream rivals KKPN and KOUL for listeners. |
| 8 | After nearly four years with Top 40/CHR, WUUU Franklinton, Louisiana (serving the Lake Pontchartrain and North Shore area between New Orleans and Baton Rouge) returns to its previous Country format and its "Cat Country 98.9" moniker. |
| 16 | After a series of comments which he suggested that Black Lives Matter protesters should be run over with cars during a June 7 broadcast that drew the ire of Major League Soccer's Portland Timbers and the University of Oregon Ducks Athletics program, Alpha Media announced that it has fired KXTG Portland afternoon host Dino Costa after only two months with the station; KXTG is the flagship station for the Ducks and Timbers. The firing also came in the wake of the August 12 far-right/white nationalist rally protesting the planned removal of a Robert E. Lee statue from a Charlottesville, Virginia park (during which, among other clashes, an Ohio man killed one and injured 19 counter-protesters in a vehicle-ramming attack), prompting Alpha to examine the matter that lead up to the decision. |
| 17 | SiriusXM makes changes in its lineup. The satellite service debuted the 90s/Y2K focused Modern Adult Top 40 PopRocks to XM17, moving Sirius XM Love to XM70, which bumps B.B. King's Bluesville to XM74 and moves Met Opera Radio to XM75; 90s/Y2K focused Active Rock Turbo goes from online to XM41, sending Punk Rock channel Faction to online; Limited Edition and Pitbull's Globalization Radio trades places (Limited from 13 to 4 and rebranded as Spotlight, Globalization from 4 to 13), and NBC Sports Radio is added to XM205. Both CNN en Español and Tiësto's Club Life Radio are dropped from the roster, the latter ending service July 24. |
| 22 | KVDU Houma/New Orleans drops its six-year-old Adult Top 40 format for rock-leaning adult hits as "104.1 The Spot." |
| 25 | Burlington, Vermont picks up its first Rhythmic Top 40, as WXZO (licensed to Willsboro, New York) drops its Mainstream Top 40 direction to become "Hot 96.7." |
| 29 | ESPN Radio suspends Ryen Russillo for two weeks after he was arrested for allegedly showing up naked and intoxicated in a stranger's condominium in Jackson Hole, Wyoming while on vacation. |
| 31 | Binghamton, New York picks up its first Rhythmic Top 40, as W225BC & WCDW-HD3 drops Classic Rock to become "Hot 92.9." The Hip-Hop leaning outlet is expected to take on Mainstream Top 40 rivals WLTB, WWYL, and WBNW-FM. |
| 31 | Providence, Rhode Island alternative rock station WBRU signs off at 11:59 p.m. from the 95.5FM frequency that it has broadcast from since 1966. The station – which is owned and operated by the non-profit Brown Broadcasting Services (BBS) organization and staffed by Brown University students (the school has no ownership over the station) – sold their license and the frequency to Educational Media Foundation on August 25. WBRU, its call letters and its intellectual properties were not part of the sale and were retained by Brown Broadcasating. In a statement on its website, WBRU announced that it would continue operations as an online radio station, with separate 24/7 feeds for both its traditional modern rock format and the hip hop and R&B program that it previously only aired on Sundays. |

=== September ===
| Date | Event |
|---|---|
| 1 | Another format flip takes place in Myrtle Beach, as WRNN/W288DK dropped ESPN Radio for Classic Hip-Hop as "G105.5." |
| 1 | After nearly 18 months with AC, WGTZ Eaton/Dayton returned to Adult Hits, this time adopting the Jack FM branding. |
| 1 | The western suburban areas of Milwaukee picked up a Rhythmic-leaning Variety Hits outlet, as WTKM/W225CP dropped Oldies in favor of "92.9 The Party." This will be the second time that "The Party" moniker was used in this market, the last being WZTI/W262CJ for eight months in 2015 when it was Rhythmic Oldies. |
| 5 | After 2 1/2 years with Rhythmic AC, and then Adult Top 40, KKGQ Newton/Wichita flipped to Country as "Kansas Country 92.3." The flip adds to an already crowded competition that includes current-focused KFDI-FM and KZSN, and Classic County rivals KFTI, KWLS, and KVWF, the latter who will soon become KKGQ's sister station. |
| 6 | WFAN New York City morning host Craig Carton (who is also part of the Boomer and Carton program that airs on CBS Sports Network alongside co-host Boomer Esiason) was arrested by federal agents at his home on charges of securities fraud, wire fraud, and conspiracy to commit those offenses. Carton and business partner Joseph Meli are alleged to have run a Ponzi scheme that defrauded $5.6 million from investors by falsely claiming they had access to millions of dollars of concert tickets at face value through non-existent agreements with concert promoters. Carton allegedly used the funds from new investors to cover millions of dollars of gambling debts and to repay earlier investors, according to the complaint filed by the U.S. Securities and Exchange Commission. |
| 6 | Due to the threats of Hurricane Irma in Puerto Rico, Radio stations WIVV, WVQR, and WVIS in Vieques, WJVP and WQML in Culebra were forced to go off the air after PREPA received a statement about an electrical outage affecting The Spanish Virgin Islands. On August 12, WJVP, WIVV and WQML resumes broadcasting. |
| 9 | For the first time since August 2009 when it switched to Mediabase, American Country Countdown will return to the Billboard charts utilizing the Country Airplay chart. The countdown show had used the Billboard Hot Country Singles chart as its official chart from its 1973 debut until the switch to Mediabase. |
| 11 | KSOC Gainesville/Dallas-Ft. Worth rebrands as "Majic 94.5" and returned to its Adult R&B format that they aired when it was "K-Soul" from 2002 until its flip to urban oldies in 2011, then again in January 2014, only to shift to Classic Hip-Hop in November of that same year; the former was also the same format that was used under the similar "Magic" moniker from 2000 to 2002. The station also changed its callsign to KZMJ on September 18. |
| 11 | Philadelphia sees yet another format flip, as WDAS (AM) & WDAS-FM HD2 dropped Smooth Jazz in favor of a hybrid Upbeat Variety Pop/Health Information mix billed as "Breakthrough Radio." The concept is a joint venture partnership between iHeartMedia and the Children's Hospital of Philadelphia, who is providing the health programming inserts and features in-between the musical presentation. |
| 14 | KOY Phoenix changed their format from conservative talk to regional Mexican, branded as "93.7 El Patrón" (simulcast on FM translator K229DB 93.7 FM, covering the central and southern portions of the market). |
| 14 | After five years with Top 40/CHR, KQHN Waskom, Texas/Shreveport returned to Adult Top 40, branded as "Q97.3". The move also reversed a format vacancy that KQHN left open since April 2012. |
| 15 | KVSF-FM Santa Fe, New Mexico changed their format from talk to jazz, branded as "The Cat". This brings the format and branding back to the market, where it had a two-year run at KSFQ from 2005 to 2007. |
| 20 | Wilfredo Blanco Pi's News Talk WAPA 680, Government-owned WIPR 940 and SBS-owned Urban AC WODA 94.7 are the only radio stations to remain on the air due to the threats of Hurricane Maria across Puerto Rico. Some of the local and regional radio stations were destroyed due to loss of communications and remain off the air. |
| 23 | The Voice of America celebrated its 75th anniversary with a dinner and dance party at the Voice of America Museum in West Chester Township, Ohio. |
| 24 | The BBC World Service launches shortwave broadcasts in Korean aimed at the Korean Peninsula from its transmitters in Taiwan and Tashkent, which North Korea quickly begins jamming. |
| 26 | Entercom announced a first round of divestments in accordance with FCC regulations pending the merger with CBS Radio. This announcement will see Classic Rock KSWD Los Angeles, and country simulcasts KSOQ-FM Escondido, California (serving North San Diego County via KSON) and WGGI Benton, Pennsylvania (serving the southwestern portion of the Scranton/Wilkes-Barre area via WGGY), change ownership to Educational Media Foundation (which was approved on November 2). According to the statement, the three stations will flip to their Christian AC K-LOVE network. The entrance of the Christian "K-LOVE" brand into the Los Angeles market would require an agreement with Univision's KLVE, which has used the branding since its debut in 1974. |
| 27 | Just nine days after the Regional Mexican format and "La Jefa" brand moved over to American General Media owned KARS/K275AO in Albuquerque and KSFE in Santa Fe, KJFA-FM launched a new Soft AC format, branded as "Cindy 101.3" under new owners Vanguard Media, putting it in competition with Cumulus Media's KMGA. |

=== October ===
| Date | Event |
|---|---|
| 1 | Ken Squier sells WDEV-AM-FM in Waterbury, Vermont, a station that has been in the Squier family since 1931, to his sales manager, Steve Cormier. Under the terms of the sale, Squier will continue to have a position at the station (including his Saturday morning novelty music show Music to Go to the Dump By) as long as he pleases. |
| 8 | The radio program Delilah begins an indefinite hiatus, following the suicide of one of the host's sons. Reruns will air until the host decides to return. |
| 9 | Just two months after ending an LMA with New South Radio that saw the Classic Country format relocating to New South's newly acquired WHJT, Flinn Broadcasting flipped the silent WJXN-FM Jackson, Mississippi to Classic Hip-Hop, branded as "Hot 100.9." |
| 17 | Tom Joyner announces that he will be ending The Tom Joyner Morning Show when the show reaches its 25th anniversary in 2019. |
| 20 | With no stunting stations to preempt it, WEZW in Wildwood Crest, New Jersey, for at least the third time in seven years, becomes the first station in the U.S. to permanently flip to Christmas music for the holiday season. |
| 20 | CKQQ-FM in Kelowna, British Columbia dumps its adult top 40 format and flips to "103.1 Beach Radio" with 80s/90s classic hits |
| 24 | The FCC, in a 3–2 vote, approved the elimination of the Main Studio Rule, which was adopted in the Communications Act of 1934 that established the FCC requiring stations to have a studio in its city of license and was modified in the 1970s to allow the studio to be within 25 miles, but will still be required to maintain local or toll-free phone numbers and public file materials that isn't online accessible for the communities they serve. The controversial elimination paves the way for broadcasters to consolidate all programming into a handful of studio locations across the country with little to no content originating in the community or markets a radio or television serves (noncommercial broadcasters were routinely exempted from the rule, and broadcasters regularly leased unused storefronts and other stations' studios as legal fictions to get around the rule anyway), and to fall in sync with present-day technology and social media. |
| 30 | After a seven-month stint with R&B/Hip-Hop, KDEY-FM Riverside/San Bernardino reinstated its Classic Hip-Hop simulcast with KDAY due to the acquisition of Rhythmic KPWR Los Angeles, which was done to avoid direct competition with its sister station as owners Meruelo Media saw KDEY's Urban format as redundant, despite having done research on targeting the area and to address signal coverage and overlapping issues. |
| 31 | Top 40/CHR WNOH Norfolk exited the format after 6 years and flipped to alternative as "Alt 105.3". |
| 31 | With a new Madison, Wisconsin-centered FM simulcast in place (via W244DR, at 96.7 FM), Mid-West Family broke WOZN away from the "Zone" format and launched a new alternative rock format as "The Resistance 106.7" under new call letters WRIS-FM. The flip returns the alternative format to the Madison market for the first time since 2005. |
| 31 | After two years with Classic Hip-Hop, WKIM Memphis began stunting with Christmas music as "Christmas 98.9." On December 26, the station flipped to AC as “98.9 The Bridge,” giving WRVR-FM a new challenger in the market. |
| 31 | Classic Hip-Hop also exits another market, as KKRG-FM Albuquerque dropped the format after nearly four years and also began stunting with Christmas music as "Santa 105.1." On December 26, the station flipped to Adult Top 40 as “Mix 105.1”. |

=== November ===
| Date | Event |
|---|---|
| 1 | Entercom announces that the merger with CBS Radio has been cleared by the FCC and the DOJ, thus paving the way for the deal to close on November 17. The company also announced that it has found new buyers for the 16 stations that they are divesting to comply with FCC ownership rules. Bonneville will acquire through an LMA San Francisco-Oakland's AC KOIT, Top 40/CHR KMVQ, and Urban AC KBLX-FM, San Jose's Classic Rock KUFX, and Sacramento's AC KYMX, Adult Top 40 KZZO, Country KNCI, and Sports KHTK (under this agreement, Bonneville will manage the stations for one year but must be spun off within 180 days after the merger closes); iHeartMedia will add Boston's Urban AC WKAF, Classic Rock WZLX, Conservative Talk WRKO, and All News WBZ (AM) (which had to ratify a contract with the local SAG-AFTRA in a last minute deal involving the station's employees), and Seattle-Tacoma's Adult Hits KJAQ, Classic Rock KZOK-FM, and Sports KFNQ, all as part of a swap deal that will see Entercom acquiring iHeartMedia's Chattanooga roster of Top 40/CHR WKXJ, Adult Hits WLND, Country WUSY, Active Rock WRXR-FM, and Urban WUSY-HD2, and Richmond's roster of Top 40/CHR WRVQ, AC WTVR-FM, Alternative WRXL, Urban WBTJ, Sports WRNL, News/Talk WRVA (AM), Classic Rock W241AP/WRVQ-HD2, and Country W253BI/WTVR-HD2 (iHeart spun off Seattle Rhythmic Top 40 KUBE and Alternative KFOO, and Boston Talk WKOX, to a divestment trust as part of a deal to get within ownership limits in the two markets on December 11; both KFOO and KUBE flipped formats on the same day, with KUBE's format moving to KPWK's HD2 sub channel); and Beasley will swap Boston AC WMJX to Entercom in exchange for Sports WBZ-FM. The sales are expected to close in 2018 upon the completion of the merger. |
| 1 | Citing "inappropriate behavior", Michael Oreskes resigns from his position as senior vice president of news at NPR after three journalists accuse him of sexual harassment. |
| 1 | CJUI-FM Kelowna, British Columbia flips to oldies branded as "Okanagan Oldies 103.9" |
| 6 | After 19 months with Rhythmic AC, CFXJ-FM Toronto shifted back to a full-fledged Rhythmic CHR while retaining the "Move" branding. |
| 9 | Country musician Pat Garrett sells Active Rock WTPA Palmyra/Harrisburg to Educational Media Foundation, giving the Pennsylvania capital city a K-Love affiliate; EMF is expected to move the format from its translator at 101.7. The sale also ends WTPA's 38-year legacy as a rock station, which began in 1980 at 104.1, followed by a move to 93.5 in 1985, with its final move to 92.1 in 2011. |
| 13 | After ten years as owner and on-air personality at WPTY Long Island, Vic Latino is selling his interest in JVC Broadcasting to his seven partners (worth $301,110.95), but will keep one of the JVC outlets, WSVU/W240CI/W295BJ West Palm Beach, with him as part of an exchange deal. JVC will continue to maintain ownership of the eight stations in New York State and Florida. |
| 17 | Entercom officially takes ownership of CBS Radio on this date. And along with it flips formats in three markets: In New York City and Dallas-Ft. Worth, the "AMP"-branded Top 40/CHRs WBMP and KVIL both switched to Alternative as "ALT 92.3" and "ALT 103.7" respectively; the flips brings the formats back to the two markets for the first time since 2012 in New York City and 2016 in Dallas-Ft. Worth. In Chicago, WJMK ended its run with Oldies/Classic Hits in favor of Classic Hip-Hop as "104.3 Jams." And in San Diego, Country KSON traded frequencies with Top 40/CHR KEGY, the latter temporarily going online until November 20. Later in the afternoon, 39-year Country veteran KMPS-FM Seattle began playing Christmas music, leading into a flip to Soft AC as "94.1 The Sound" on December 4; that flip later resulted in KVRQ to quickly drop Active Rock on the same day to become “Country 98.9” and challenge KMPS’ sister KKWF in the market. |
| 17 | Cumulus Media pulls the format plug on its two outlets in two markets in favor of Christmas music. After two years with Rhythmic AC, WRWM Indianapolis began stunting as "North Pole Radio,” while in Green Bay, WKRU drops Adult Alternative to become "Christmas @ 106.7". On December 25, WKRU flipped to Classic Rock as “106.7 The Big Dog,” while WRWM (under new calls WYRG) flipped to Top 40/CHR as “Energy 93.9” on December 26. |
| 20 | After six years with Classic Rock, and then six months with Adult Hits, WDTW-FM Detroit flipped to Alternative as Alt 106.7, launching with "Seven Nation Army" by Detroit's The White Stripes. The flip, which come amidst rumors that Entercom was going to flip one of its outlets in the market to the same format, puts them in competition with the Windsor-based CIMX-FM, and gives the market its first U.S.-based alternative rock station since WMGC-FM's period as 105.1 The Edge from 1997 until 1999. |
| 20 | President Donald Trump puts an indefinite hiatus on the weekly Presidential radio address after 35 years, citing feedback that it wasn't used to its full potential (the last broadcast was October 13). While there is no official word on whether it is being discontinued, White House Press Secretary Sarah Huckabee Sanders did leave open the possibility of resuming the broadcasts in the future. |
| 23 | Cumulus Media's KAYD-FM Beaumont dropped its Nash FM Country format and began playing Christmas music as “Santa 101.7” ahead of a planned format flip and an impending signal upgrade for Classic Country sister KYKZ Lake Charles, Louisiana to cover the area. However, on December 26, KAYD-FM returned to its Country format without any explanation. |
| 27 | After two years with Classic Hip-Hop, WBMO Columbus, Ohio dropped the format and began simulcasting Rhythmic contemporary sister WCKX. The simulcasts comes full circle, as it expands the "Power" branding to its former 106.3 signal after 20 years. |
| 29 | After nearly four years as a Top 40/CHR, WQMP Orlando flipped to Alternative, branded as "Alt 101.9"; they're the third Entercom station to flip to the "Alt" brand. This brought the format back to a full-market signal for the first time since 2008, when sister WOCL flipped to classic hits. (The most recent station to air the format, W297BB/WCFB-HD2, was aired on a translator and an HD sub-channel, and aired from June 2014 to January 2016.) |
| 29 | Minnesota Public Radio fires A Prairie Home Companion creator and ex-host Garrison Keillor over an allegation of inappropriate behavior, thus losing the rights to the name A Prairie Home Companion (to which Keillor holds the trademarks). The show that had been airing under that name with Chris Thile as host continues under the name Live from Here. |
| 29 | Cumulus Media files for Chapter 11 bankruptcy as part of a restructuring of the company. |

=== December ===
| Date | Event |
|---|---|
| 1 | Another Beaumont station switched formats, as Univision's KQBU-FM drops Regional Mexican to simulcast KAMA-FM Houston’s Spanish Top 40 “Latino Mix” presentation. |
| 1 | Rogers Media rebrands CHFM-FM Calgary from "KiSS 95.9" to its former longtime "95.9 CHFM" branding, similar to sisters CHYM-FM in Kitchener and CHFI-FM in Toronto. Also, the station flipped to an All-Christmas music format on the same day as the rebrand before returning to its normal programming on December 26. |
| 2 | John Hockenberry, former host of Public Radio International's The Takeaway, is accused of sexual harassment by several female co-workers. |
| 4 | Adult Top 40 KIOW Forest City, Iowa fires sports director Orin Harris after he was caught making comments with a board operator who also works as a school teacher (and was also fired by the school district) about the make up of how many Hispanic players that were on a rival boys’ high school basketball team during a radio broadcast, then went further by mocking the students’ last names and quoting anti-immigration policy speeches that was made by President Donald Trump, not knowing that the off-air conversation would be streaming live on Facebook while they were talking. |
| 5 | Classic Country KVWF Wichita drops the format and joined the growing list of stations playing Christmas music until a new format is launched after the holidays. |
| 8 | After six years with Top 40/CHR, WRGV Pensacola-Mobile adopted W262BL/WMXC-HD2's urban contemporary format as "107.3 The Beat". The flip gives WBLX new competition in the two Gulf Coast markets. |
| 11 | iHeartMedia's Active Rock KBPI Denver moved from its home of 23 years at 106.7 to 107.9 FM (formerly KPAW, which targets the Fort Collins and Northern Front Range areas, including Cheyenne, Wyoming, where it moved KPAW's Classic Rock format to 92.9), translator K300CP (also at 107.9 FM) in Denver, and to KDZA-FM (also at 107.9 FM) in Colorado Springs (which also targets the Pueblo area). On December 18, the 106.7 signal relaunched with a Country format, branded as “106.7 The Bull” and new calls KWBL, which is expected to take on established rivals KYGO and KWOF in the Mile High City. |
| 11 | The legendary Rhythmic format of KUBE Seattle-Tacoma has come to an end as they flip to Contemporary Christian under the KTDD call letters; at the same time as KUBE's flip, sister KFOO drops its nearly two-year-old Alternative Rock format and flips to smooth jazz under the KFNY call letters. The flips come after the sale of the two stations was announced by owner iHeartMedia as they are acquiring KJAQ, KFNQ and KZOK-FM from Entercom as part of their merger with CBS Radio, with KUBE and KFOO needing to be divested to meet ownership limits. |
| 18 | Tegna, Inc. announces it will purchase KFMB AM-FM-TV in San Diego from Midwest Television for $325 million. The deal marks Tegna's re-entry into radio, as predecessor Gannett Company had sold its previous radio group to Evergreen Media in 1997. |
| 18 | The Overcomer Ministry host Brother Stair is arrested on eight counts, which include three counts of first-degree criminal sexual conduct and single counts of assault with the intent to commit criminal sexual conduct, kidnapping, second-degree assault, first-degree burglary, and third-degree criminal sexual conduct with a minor. The show will discontinue its radio broadcasts on January 1, 2018, but will continue on satellite and its website. |
| 21 | Citing his battle with cancer and declining health, Charles Osgood retires from his radio show The Osgood File, which had aired since 1967. |
| 26 | Chincoteague, Virginia picks up a Rhythmic Adult Top 40 outlet, as WVES drops Country to become “101.5 The Mix,” with an emphasis on current hits and recurrents from the 1990s and 2000s. |
| 26 | Jack FM comes to Topeka, as former Salina/Manhattan, Kansas-targeted Oldies KSAJ-FM enters the market with the Variety Hits format. |
| 28 | After stunting with Christmas music, KVWF Wichita gives way to Kansas's first Adult Alternative station as "Flight 100.5". |

== Debuts ==
| Date | Event |
|---|---|
| February | FM 2 begins broadcast in Quezon City, Philippines under Philippine Broadcasting Service after replacing Business Radio |
| April 20 | Univision launched Univision Deportes Radio on ten of its owned and operated stations. The Spanish-language network plans to utilize their extensive coverage of soccer games as the basis of their programming and to counter the offerings from ESPN Deportes. |
| May 18 | The Beatles Channel, a new full-time station licensed and authorized by Apple Corps featuring music from the "Fab Four" as well as their solo material, debuts on SiriusXM, broadcasting on XM18. |
| May 25 | Envision Networks and Weigel Broadcasting begins expanding the Oldies format of WRME-LP Chicago, broadcasting under the "MeTV FM" branding nationwide. |

== Closings ==
| Date | Event |
|---|---|
| January 2 | A storm folds the tower of WGPC in Albany, Georgia in half, taking the station silent. On March 22, owner Cumulus Media announced that the WGPC license would be returned to the Federal Communications Commission. WGPC was Albany's first radio station. |
| January 11 | Norway was scheduled to become the first country to discontinue FM broadcasts, as it officially flips the switch to Digital Audio Broadcasting for Radio. This move, albeit controversial, is being watched by other countries to see if this transition works. |
| January 26 | Comedian/actor Jay Mohr announced that he is ending his fan-based program Jay Mohr Sports and is exiting Fox Sports Radio after three years to focus on his family and other projects. His co-hosts Dan Beyer and Jonas Knox will continue as interim host until a new replacement is announced. |
| January 28 | After 30 years as the original host and creator of Open House Party, John Garabedian retires from radio with his last broadcast. |
| January 31 | Radio Australia shuts down its shortwave service after 73 years. |
| February 8 | After a facing a series of legal challenges stemming from an incident in which a contestant died from water intoxication during a contest in 2007 that lead to the family awarded $25 Million in damages in 2009, thus triggering a possible revoking of its license, Entercom announced that they would be voluntarily handing in the KDND Sacramento broadcast license to the FCC, taking KDND off the air permanently and opening their FM frequency (107.9) for new applications for this frequency (a process that will take three to five years). The format and calls, including "The End" moniker will relocate to KUDL on February 6, 2017, bringing the Top 40/CHR format back to the 106.5 signal for the first time since KUDL's predecessor KWOD transitioned to Alternative in 1993. The move also clears a hurdle in the announced merger between Entercom and CBS Radio, as their Sacramento roster of stations must divest itself of three FM properties in the market. |
| February 18 | After 25 years, the Classical formatted W-BACH Network, which at its height served the Southern, Central and Down East portions of Maine, signs off the air. The stations that simulcast it became simulcasts of parent company Binnie Media's sister outlets, with WBQX Thomaston simulcasting Classic Hits WFNK Lewiston and W245AA Portland simulcasting Country sister WTHT Auburn. |
| February 28 | KFNZ Salt Lake City signed off the air after 95 years; Cumulus had planned to turn the license in to the FCC, but requested a STA to leave it silenced pending a sale of the transmitter equipment and the license to another owner. The announcement comes with the ending its 21-year run with a Sports talk format and a three-year affiliation with CBS Sports Radio. |
| March 31 | Fox Sports Radio affiliate KICE Bend, Oregon leaves the air and its license deleted after 58 years. FM sister KOCE, which simulcasted KICE, will direct listeners to the 94.9 signal and take the KICE calls. |
| March 31 | After a 17-year run, Entercom Rhythmic Top 40 KQKS Lakewood/Denver confirmed that its morning team of Larry Ulibarri and Kathie Jay are no longer with the station after the two parties failed to come to terms on a new contract. The morning team's third partner, Kendall B., left KQKS in January to pursue other opportunities. KQKS plans to fill the morning slot with its current staffers until an announcement is made. |
| May 1 | WENN Birmingham signs off the air after 67 years. The move also ends its run with the AC format it was programming via FM Translator W271BN, which owner Summit Media sold to Educational Media Foundation, however, three days later, WENN returned to the air broadcasting Soft AC. |
| May 3 | Frank Deford delivers his last commentary for NPR. |
| May 7 | As part of an AM revitalization plan, the FCC plans to shut down Puerto Rican AM synchronized stations located at WA2XPA Arecibo, WI2XSO Mayagüez, WI3XSO Aguadilla and WI2XAC Ponce. Radio stations WAPA and WIAC in San Juan and WISO in Ponce petitioned to allow the licenses cancelled by that date. |
| June 30 | After a two-year tenure with the station, and due to tensions with WLZD-LP General Manager Sam Neace, East Kentucky DJs "Jammin" Jon Colwell and Jack "Jack Attack" Caudill decide to combine both Flashback Fridays and Throwback With Jack Attack into one final show. With one hour left, Neace made the decision to pull the plug on the farewell show. Despite being pulled, the DJ's traveled to the station and said their goodbyes to their respective fanbases on the air. This incident also ends Colwell and Neace's Five-Year Working Relationship. |
| July 24 | After 17 years, online Dance station Music One shuts down operations, citing declining listenership and increasing costs of being a non-profit entity on the air. |
| Late Summer | After a nearly 52-year run, as well as serving as a launch pad for future Fox Sports personality Kevin Burkhardt and Grammy Award-winning singer-songwriter Tracy Chapman, Mariana Broadcasting announced on June 20 that it will sign-off Oldies WGHT/1500-Pompton Lakes, New Jersey (covering the suburban part of Northern New Jersey within the New York City Metropolitan Area). Owner and General Manager John Silliman intends to attempt to donate the license to a local school or non-profit. |
| August 31 | Sheridan Broadcasting Corporation ceased operations on its News and Sports division. The Gospel Network will continue under Sheridan ownership. |
| September 17 | Philippine Broadcasting Service permanently signed off DZRM 1278 Radyo Magasin. The Radyo Magasin brand merged with sister station DZSR Sports Radio 918 and officially rebranded as Radyo Pilipinas 2 the following day. |
| September 24 | Just two years after it was purchased from the University of Sioux Falls (South Dakota), Classic Rock KBAD-FM Sioux Falls ceased permanent operation and advertised for sale – citing result of on-going litigation between owner Chuck Brennan and his Dollar Loan Center operations, this after he was forced to shutter all of his businesses and assets following the South Dakota Division of Banking revoking the business licenses earlier this month. The move also came as a result of South Dakota voters having approved a measure in November 2016 capping high interest short-term loans at 36% interest. |
| October 1 | Car Talk ends distribution. The NPR series had been in reruns for five years following co-host Tom Magliozzi's dementia diagnosis and eventual death. |
| November 17 | After 19 years together, Mike & Mike, ESPN Radio's nationally broadcast morning show, ended its run. Host Mike Greenberg departed for ESPN television, while Mike Golic, whose time in the time slot predated Greenberg's arrival, will continue with Trey Wingo as his co-host. |
| December 22 | After a two-year run, The Ed Lover Show aired its final broadcast, with the final week's programs to be a best-of Show. |
| December 22 | Talk Radio Network abruptly ceases operations without notice. |
| December 31 | After a seven-year run, Nikki Sixx announced that he is ending his syndicated programs Sixx Sense with Nikki Sixx and the spinoffs Side Show Countdown and Side Show Classic to focus on other projects. Premiere Networks, the shows' distributor, is expected to announce a replacement before the end of the year. |
| December 31 | After 97 years, including a successful run as a Top 40 and the last 42 years with All-News, KQV Pittsburgh will sign off the air, citing a changing environment in news gathering and the deaths of its owners. It is not known at this point whether the license will return to the FCC or if a new buyer is being sought but station management has confirmed that they plan to air its last broadcast on this date regardless of the outcome. |
| December 31 | Full service Oldies WSPQ Springville, New York ceased broadcasting on this date after 31 years, citing difficulties due to competition from the Buffalo radio market in terms of revenue, its struggle to upgrade their facilities and the stigma of being a station that is privately owned. |
| December 31 | WCAZ Carthage, Illinois signs off. The station had been operating for months in defiance of an FCC order revoking its license. |

== Deaths ==
| Date | Name | Age | Notability | Source |
|---|---|---|---|---|
| February 15 | Stuart McLean | 68 | Canadian host of The Vinyl Cafe on CBC Radio and Public Radio International | |
| February 20 | Steve Hewlett | 58 | British host of The Media Show on BBC Radio 4 | |
| February 21 | Frank Delaney | 74 | Irish-born author, creator and host of Word of Mouth on BBC Radio 4 | |
| February 22 | Stephen Rhodes | 66 | British presenter on BBC Three Counties Radio, BBC Radio Northampton, BBC Radio Shropshire, Beacon Radio, BRMB, and WABC | |
| February 23 | Alan Colmes | 66 | American political commentator, host of The Alan Colmes Show on Fox News Radio. Also worked at WABC, WNBC, WHN, WMCA, and WEVD in New York City; WEZE and WZLX in Boston; and WNHC in New Haven, Connecticut. | |
| March 3 | Tommy Page | 46 | American singer/actor, VJ, record executive, publisher at Billboard, and VP/Executive at Pandora Radio and Cumulus Media | |
| March 13 | John Andariese | 78 | American sports journalist, reporter and analyst, nicknamed "Johnny Hoops" for his play-by-play of the New York Knicks broadcasts on TV and radio | |
| April 8 | Brian Matthew | 88 | British presenter of Sounds of the 60s and several other shows on BBC Radio 2 | |
| April 26 | Larry Levite | 77 | American owner of WBEN in Buffalo, New York from 1978 to 1994 | |
| May 19 | Wayne Walker | 80 | Retired American football player (Detroit Lions). Also former radio color commentator for the San Francisco 49ers and Oakland Athletics. | |
| May 28 | Ken Ackerman | 95 | American announcer, best known as host of the show "Music 'Til Dawn" on KCBS San Francisco from 1942 to 1995 | |
| May 28 | Frank Deford | 78 | American sports commentator on NPR's Morning Edition | |
| July 5 | Paul Hollingdale | 79 | British presenter on BBC Radio 2, CNBC, Radio 210, and Blue Danube Radio | |
| July 9 | Matt Patrick | 58 | American host on WKDD Akron and KTRH Houston | |
| July 16 | Stephen Rice | 46 | American host on Austin, Texas stations KUT and KOOP, and gay rights activist | |
| July 23 | Elliott Castro | 68 | Puerto Rican sports broadcaster and panelist of La Descarga Original on WSKN in San Juan, Puerto Rico | |
| July 28 | Pam Dixon | 59 | American radio personality in the Des Moines market, notably as an on-air staffer with Saga Communications' KRNT, KIOA and KRNQ | |
| August 1 | Ismael Gonzalez | 83 | Puerto Rican radio host, entrepreneur and producer; known as "El Loco de los Milagros" | |
| August 6 | Darren Daulton | 55 | American retired professional baseball player (Philadelphia Phillies, Florida Marlins) and host of "Talking Baseball with Dutch" on WPEN in Burlington, New Jersey from 2010 to 2017 | |
| August 11 | Neil Chayet | 78 | American lawyer and host of Looking at the Law on WBZ Boston from 1976 to 2017 | |
| August 18 | Gary O'Callaghan | 83 | Australian host on 2SM and 2UE | |
| August 19 | Dick Gregory | 84 | American comedian, actor, author, and activist; radio work included morning host at WOL Washington, D.C., Make It Plain on SiriusXM 146, and Imus in the Morning | |
| August 20 | Jerry Lewis | 91 | American actor and comedian (co-star of The Martin and Lewis Show on the NBC Radio Network from 1949 to 1953, alongside Dean Martin) | |
| August 21 | Felo Ramírez | 94 | Cuban-American sportscaster, most notably for the Spanish language play-by-play broadcasts of the Miami Marlins from 1993 to 2017 for which he received the Ford C. Frick Award. Also appeared on the Spanish version of the Gillette Cavalcade of Sports on the NBC Radio Network. | |
| August 24 | Jay Thomas | 69 | American actor, comedian, programmer, personality, and voice talent; host of The Jay Thomas Show on SiriusXM; alumni of WKTU New York City and KPWR Los Angeles; air shifts and program duties in the Jacksonville and Charlotte markets. | |
| August 25 | Drew Morphett | 69 | Australian sports commentator on ABC | |
| August 30 | Skip Prokop | 73 | Canadian drummer (Lighthouse, The Paupers), DJ (host of Rock and a Hard Place on CFNY-FM Toronto), and advertising salesman for Astral Media stations CJBX-FM, CIQM-FM, and CJBK. | |
| September 1 | Ralph Dellor | 69 | Retired British cricketer and sportscaster for BBC Radio. Winner of the 2000 Jack Fingleton Award for Best Cricket Commentator. | |
| September 11 | Glenn Haege | 70 | American contractor, columnist for The Detroit News, and host of the syndicated program The Handyman Show | |
| September 14 | Sean Adams | 46 | American sportscaster, host of The Bottom Line on KVET Austin, Texas from 2007 to 2017 | |
| September 20 | Jimmy Magee | 82 | Irish sportscaster on RTÉ from 1956 to 2017. Won a 1972 Jacob's Award. | |
| September 22 | Rick Shaw | 78 | American DJ (WQAM, WXMJ and WIOD in Miami, and stations in Denver, St. Louis and Omaha, Nebraska). | |
| September 27 | Hugh Hefner | 91 | American magazine publisher and businessman. Founder of Playboy Radio and host of its program The Playboy Morning Show. | |
| September 28 | Alan Thompson | 54 | British presenter on BBC Radio Wales | |
| September 30 | Joe Taruc | 70 | Filipino news anchor and radio broadcaster (DZRH, DZMM-AM, DZBB-AM) | |
| October 10 | Bob Schiller | 98 | American writer (Duffy's Tavern, Abbott and Costello, The Adventures of Ozzie and Harriet, The Mel Blanc Show, Sweeney and March, and December Bride) | |
| November 2 | Bill Wilkerson | 72 | American news anchor and host (KMOX in St. Louis, Missouri) and sports announcer (Missouri Tigers football, St. Louis Cardinals football) | |
| November 17 | Robert D. Raiford | 89 | American news anchor and host (WTOP Washington, DC; WEGO Concord, North Carolina; and Charlotte, North Carolina stations WBT, and WIST; commentator on The John Boy and Billy Big Show) | |
| November 19 | Mel Tillis | 85 | American country music performer (member of the Grand Ole Opry from 2007 until his death) and radio station owner | |
| November 20 | Mario Vega | 59 | Puerto Rican radio reporter and host of NotiUno en la Noche on WUNO/San Juan | |
| December 18 | Kim Jong-hyun | 27 | South Korean singer and host of Blue Night on MBC | |
| December 19 | Cliff Winston | N/A | American DJ and programmer in the R&B/Hip-Hop and Urban AC genres. Alumni of KJLH and KKBT Los Angeles, and KMJM St. Louis. | |
| December 23 | George Maida | 62 | American DJ and on–air host (host of The Electric Croude and Classical Evening on WCVE-FM Richmond, Virginia and All Things Considered on National Public Radio) | |
| December 26 | Irv Weinstein | 87 | American news anchor and local radio actor (WHAM Rochester, New York; WKBW Buffalo, New York) | |
| December 27 | Raul Carbonell | 88 | Puerto Rican radio announcer mainly for WIPR San Juan | |
| December 28 | Harvey Steele | 60 | American DJ and longtime morning personality at WKKO/Toledo, Ohio | |
