= K275AO =

- Albuquerque, New Mexico; United States
- Broadcast area: Albuquerque area
- Frequency: 98.5 (HD2)
- Branding: Fuego 102.9

Programming
- Format: Hispanic Rhythmic

Ownership
- Owner: American General Media; (AGM-Nevada, LLC.)
- Sister stations: KABG, KIOT, KJFA-FM, KKRG-FM, KKSS, KLVO

History
- First air date: 2005

Technical information
- Licensing authority: FCC
- Facility ID: 139243
- Class: D
- ERP: 99 watts
- Translator: 102.9 K275AO (Albuquerque)

Links
- Public license information: Public file; LMS
- Webcast: Listen Live
- Website: fuego1029.com

K275AO is an FM translator station in Albuquerque, New Mexico airing a Hispanic Rhythmic format branded a "Fuego 102.9". The translator is fed from an HD Radio subchannel of KABG-HD2. It is owned by American General Media. The format is also simulcast on KJFA-FM 102.9 in Pecos, New Mexico.

== History ==
K275AO started on December 19, 2005, as a repeater for classical music station KHFM 95.5 to improve coverage in the northeast heights.

In July 2013 K275AO was upgraded from 10 watts to 99 watts. The program source would also be switched to rebroadcast the programming from KARS 840 AM which had also moved its facility closer to Albuquerque and moved from AM 860 to 840. After a week of informing listeners that KHFM was no longer on the translator, the station had been playing a loop of the theme from Close Encounters of the Third Kind repeatedly for nearly five days. KARS/K275AO launched a modern rock format branded as "Area 102.9" at noon on July 24, 2013. "Area" launched with "10,000 songs in a row"; however, it was nearly four months before the station started to run commercials regularly, as is sometimes common with new stations. The modern rock format originally featured alternative music from the 1980s to current hits.

On August 3, 2015, American General Media took over operations of then-KSFE 102.9 in Santa Fe, which could possibly allow for more flexibility to upgrade the translator, which at the current 99 watts, is tightly placed between KIOT and KDRF, both of which broadcast at the full 22 kW from atop Sandia Crest, making the signal somewhat hard to pick up.

On August 31, 2015, KARS/K275AO shifted its format from modern rock to active rock, still branded as "Area 102.9", with the new slogan "Shut Up and Rock". The ratings had improved with this format, but still remained low.

On September 18, 2017, KARS picked up the Regional Mexican format and "La Jefa" brand that had aired on then-KJFA-FM 101.3, which had been spun off to Vanguard Media after American General Media acquired stations owned by Univision Radio. On October 25, 2017, the call sign on AM 840 was changed to KJFA. It also began a simulcast with the sister-station 102.9 in Pecos which became KJFA-FM.

On February 27, 2018, KJFA/K275AO changed its format from regional Mexican to Spanish AC, branded as "Exitos 102.9".

On August 30, 2019, at noon, KJFA, K275AO and KJFA-FM flipped to Spanish language rhythmic branded as "Fuego 102.9".

On March 2, 2023, American General Media sold KJFA AM 840 to KD Radio, owners of KDSK for $50,000. Translator K275AO was not part of the sale and in April 2023, the "Fuego" format was added as an HD Radio subchannel of KABG as KABG-HD2, which became the new program source for K275AO. On June 1, 2023, the simulcast ended on AM 840 which changed the call letters to KDNF and launched a new format playing Classic Country music following consummation.
