= La Jefa =

La Jefa (m. El Jefe), a Spanish term meaning "the chief" or "the boss", may refer to:

== People ==
- Enedina Arellano Félix, Mexican drug lord, known by her alias "La Jefa"
- Laura Gallardo, American mixed martial artist, nicknamed "La Jefa"
- Rosalinda González Valencia, Mexican businesswoman and cartel member, known by her alias "La Jefa"

== Media ==
- La Jefa, 2009 studio album by Alicia Villarreal
- "La Jefa", song by Ramón Orlando
- "La Jefa", episode 26 of American crime drama television series Narcos: Mexico
- La Jefa (TV series), American television series
- Under Her Control, Spanish drama film, known in Spanish as La jefa

=== Radio ===
- "La Jefa 102.7", subchannel of American radio station KNDE
- "La Jefa", former subchannel of American radio station WGPR
- K275AO, American radio station formerly known as La Jefa
- KDNF, American radio station formerly known as La Jefa
- KEXA, American radio station known as La Jefa
- KFZO, American radio station formerly known as La Jefa
- KLJA, American radio station formerly known as La Jefa
- KJFA-FM, American radio station formerly known as La Jefa
- KKRG-FM, American radio station formerly known as La Jefa
- KNLY, American radio station known as La Jefa
- KOND, American radio station formerly known as La Jefa
- WAYE, American radio station known as La Jefa
- WBZQ, former American radio station known as La Jefa
- WCSZ, American radio station known as La Jefa
- WDMV, American radio station known as La Jefa
- WQCD (AM), American radio station formerly known as La Jefa
- WGUE (AM), American radio station known as La Jefa
- WJHX, American radio station known as La Jefa
- WKBF (AM), former American radio station known as La Jefa
- WQCR, American radio station known as La Jefa
- WUNA, American radio station formerly known as La Jefa
- WZGX, American radio station formerly known as La Jefa
- XHEMY-FM, Mexican radio station known as La Jefa
- XHENG-FM, Mexican radio station formerly known as La Jefa
- XHENX-FM, Mexican radio station formerly known as La Jefa
- XHEOH-FM, Mexican radio station known as La Jefa
- XHHY-FM, Mexican radio station formerly known as La Jefa
- XHJAQ-FM, Mexican radio station formerly known as La Jefa
- XHLX-FM, Mexican radio station formerly known as La Jefa
- XHMQ-FM, Mexican radio station known as La Jefa
- XHYW-FM, Mexican radio station formerly known as La Jefa
- XHMZT-FM, Mexican radio station formerly known as La Jefa

== See also ==
- El Jefe
