= KJFA =

KJFA may refer to:

- KJFA-FM, a radio station (102.9 FM) licensed to serve Pecos, New Mexico, United States
- KDNF, a radio station (840 AM) licensed to serve Belen, New Mexico, which held the call sign KJFA from 2017 to 2023
- KYLZ (FM), a radio station (101.3 FM) licensed to serve Albuquerque, New Mexico, which held the call sign KJFA from 2002 to 2006 and KJFA-FM from 2015 to 2017
- KKRG-FM, a radio station (105.1 FM) licensed to serve Santa Fe, New Mexico, which held the call sign KJFA from 2006 to 2015
- KSAI (FM), a radio station (99.5 FM) licensed to serve Citrus Heights, California, United States, which held the call sign KJFA from 1989 to 1997
