= KCOE =

KCOE may refer to:

- KCOE (AM), a defunct radio station (940 AM) formerly licensed to serve Bend, Oregon, United States
- KDJA, a radio station (94.9 FM) licensed to serve Terrebonne, Oregon, which held the call sign KCOE from 2015 to 2017
- KCOE-FM, the former radio station of Coe College in Cedar Rapids, Iowa
- Coeur d'Alene Airport (ICAO code KCOE)
