= KKRG =

KKRG may refer to:

- KKRG-FM, a radio station (105.1 FM) licensed to serve Santa Fe, New Mexico, United States
- KYLZ (FM), a radio station (101.3 FM) licensed to serve Albuquerque, New Mexico, United States, which held the call sign KKRG from 2006 to 2015
