= KLVO =

Regional Mexican radio station in Belen, New Mexico

- Belen, New Mexico; United States
- Broadcast area: Albuquerque and Central New Mexico
- Frequency: 97.7 MHz
- Branding: Radio Lobo 97.7 FM

Programming
- Format: Regional Mexican

Ownership
- Owner: American General Media
- Sister stations: KABG; KIOT; KJFA-FM; KKRG-FM; KKSS

History
- First air date: 1981 (as KMLW)
- Former call signs: KMLW (1981–1985); KARS-FM (1985–1995); KLVO (1995–2007); KDLW (2007–2011)
- Call sign meaning: "Lobo" with V substituted for B

Technical information
- Licensing authority: FCC
- Facility ID: 25529
- Class: C1
- ERP: 100,000 watts
- HAAT: 262 meters (860 ft)
- Transmitter coordinates: 34.7987°N 106.8170°W

Links
- Public license information: Public file; LMS
- Webcast: Listen live
- Website: www.radiolobo.net

KLVO (97.7 MHz) is an FM radio station serving Central New Mexico. It is licensed to Belen, New Mexico, and is owned by American General Media. Its studios are located in Northeast Albuquerque, and its transmitter is located west of Los Lunas, New Mexico. KLVO broadcasts a New Mexico music and regional Mexican format branded as "Radio Lobo".

== Station history ==
From 1985 to 1995, 97.7 was KARS-FM, which had a country music format, some of which had remained in existence on KARS long after the FM station dropped the format. In July 1994 KARS AM & FM were sold by Brooks Broadcasting Company to Guardian Communications for $665,000.

In early 1995, after having upgraded to a class C1 with increased power to 100,000 watts, the station became KLVO "Radio Lobo", and aired a Regional Mexican format. At the time of its launch, there were no other Spanish language radio stations on the FM band other than the programming on public radio station KANW. "Lobo" faced more competition soon after its launch, but had become the top rated Spanish station for many years. In November 2007, it moved to 106.7 FM, but would fall to its competitor KJFA. Lobo ended on January 31, 2011, to make way for another station that also started on the same 97.7 frequency.

=== Wild 97.7 ===
KDLW launched on December 7, 2007, as a newly revived version of former Rhythmic Top 40 sister station KYLZ, "Wild 106". (KYLZ aired on 106.3 FM from 1997–2005, and went head-to-head with KKSS, which had been very popular with local youth for much of the 1990s. The two stations would often be in a fierce battle for hip-hop listeners over the next seven years. KYLZ would be the lone rhythmic station for a period of almost two years after KKSS shifted to mainstream top 40 in early 2001, but returned to rhythmic in late 2002, putting the two stations in direct competition once again for the next couple of years until "Wild" ended in February 2005 in favor of a news and talk format.) However, the new version of "Wild" would not have the same impact as KYLZ had. In the Arbitron ratings, KDLW lagged greatly behind KKSS, as well as KKOB-FM.

KYLZ's former frequency returned to Rhythmic as KAGM, "Power 106", in July 2009. This gave AGM two stations in the same cluster with the same format for about a month until KDLW flipped formats.

=== OMG! 97.7 ===
On August 24, 2009, KDLW shifted to Mainstream Top 40/CHR and rebranded as "OMG! 97.7". The move had been noticeable since its sign-on as "Wild 97.7", in which the station had been playing more Mainstream Top 40 product and in the wake of KAGM's flip to Rhythmic the previous month. With this conversion, KDLW now finds itself taking on the more established Top 40/CHR rival KKOB-FM.

On January 31, 2011, the "OMG!" format moved to 106.7 FM, which covers the Albuquerque area with less static, a problem for 97.7 and about three other stations broadcasting out of Valencia County from sites about 30 miles south of Albuquerque. Its broadcast on 97.7 ended on February 17, with a loop of morning personalities Jeff & Jamie telling listeners to tune into 106.7 throughout the entire day.

=== Shine 97.7 ===
On February 18, 2011, KDLW flipped to a Christian Contemporary music format, branded as "Shine 97.7". However, the Albuquerque market already has a few non-commercial stations broadcasting the niche format, including KQLV ("K-Love"), which is programmed by satellite, as well as KFLQ, KNKT and younger focused stations KLYT and KQRI. "Shine" was a commercial format, but emphasized that it was locally based, promoting it as "Albuquerque's Very Own". The format, however, only lasted just over seven months.

=== La Invasora/Radio Lobo ===
The regional Mexican format returned on September 30, 2011, first branded as "97.7 La Invasora", but in early November 2012, it had revived its former "Radio Lobo" brand that had been used on this frequency from 1995 to 2007. It has also begun a simulcast on KKIM-FM, extending its coverage to Santa Fe and Northern New Mexico. On August 3, 2015, the Santa Fe simulcast moved to KSFE. On September 18, 2017, the KSFE simulcast switched to KARS, which had picked up the format of rival KJFA-FM branded as "La Jefa", adding a second Regional Mexican station to the American General Media cluster.

Beginning in January 2015, KLVO/KSFE began airing El show de Piolin, which had aired on rival KJFA from 2007 to 2013.
