= El Jefe =

El Jefe (f. La Jefa), a Spanish term meaning "the chief" or "the boss", may refer to:

== People ==
- Rafael Trujillo (1891–1961), former dictator of the Dominican Republic, nicknamed "El Jefe"
- Stéphane Konaté (born 1980), Ivorian basketball player nicknamed "El Jefe"
- Ryan Wedding (born 1981), drug trafficker nicknamed "El Jefe"
- Bum Farto (born 1919) American fire chief and convicted drug dealer nicknamed “El Jefe”
- "El Jefe", a less-common nickname for former Cuban President Fidel Castro (deriving from his title as Comandante en Jefe or "Commander-in-Chief" of Cuban Armed Forces)
- Jorge González von Marées (1900-1962), Chilean national socialist politician
- El Alfa El Jefe, more commonly known as "El Alfa", a Dominican rapper.

== Other ==
- El jefe (1958 film), an Argentine crime film by Fernando Ayala
- El Jefe (jaguar), a wild jaguar that was reported in the United States
- El Jefe (song), a song by Shakira and Fuerza Regida
- "El Jefe" (Ash vs Evil Dead), a 2015 television episode
- "Jefe", a song by Daddy Yankee from the 2007 album El Cartel: The Big Boss
- El Jefe, a fictional character from the 2013 video game Sly Cooper: Thieves in Time

== See also ==
- La Jefa
- El Hefe (born 1965), guitar player for the punk band NOFX
