= Dan Beyer =

American radio presenter

- Born: Daniel James Beyer; January 16, 1977 (age 49); Merrill, Wisconsin
- Education: University of Wisconsin–Madison
- Presenting career
- Show: The Doug Gottlieb Show
- Network: Fox Sports Radio
- Time slot: 12:00 PM–3:00 PM PST/PDT
- Style: Sports talk
- Country: United States

Daniel James "Diamond Dan" Beyer (born January 16, 1977) is an American radio presenter, usually heard doing half-hourly updates weekdays on Fox Sports Radio during Jay Mohr Sports. Beyer has been with Fox Sports Radio since 2005, after working at radio stations in Baraboo and Madison.

Beyer won "Sidekick of the Year" for Sports Fox Radio.
