= KEZX =

- Medford, Oregon; United States
- Broadcast area: Medford-Ashland
- Frequency: 730 kHz
- Branding: Fox Sports Radio 730 AM

Programming
- Format: Defunct (was Sports)
- Affiliations: Fox Sports Radio, Premiere Radio Networks, Westwood One

Ownership
- Owner: Opus Broadcasting Systems

History
- First air date: May 31, 1954 (as KBOY)
- Former call signs: KBOY (1954–1983); KRVC (1983–1985); KBOY (1985–1989); KRVC (1989–1997); KLVB (1997–2003)

Technical information
- Licensing authority: FCC
- Facility ID: 23032
- Class: D
- Power: 1,000 watts day 74 watts night
- Transmitter coordinates: 42°18′36″N 122°48′41″W

Links
- Public license information: Public file; LMS

KEZX (730 AM) was a radio station broadcasting a sports format. Licensed to Medford, Oregon, United States, the station served the Medford-Ashland area. The station was last owned by Opus Broadcasting Systems.

It was announced by All Access Radio Group on Friday, January 18, 2008, that KEZX was going to switch to "All Sports" on February 4, 2009. The station was then to be known as "Fox Sports Radio 730 AM," using programming from Fox Sports Radio, Premiere Radio Networks and The Jim Rome Show.

Opus Broadcasting surrendered KEZX's license to the Federal Communications Commission on May 22, 2023, and it was cancelled the same day.
