= WXYX =

Radio station broadcasting from Puerto Rico

- Bayamon, Puerto Rico; Puerto Rico
- Broadcast area: Puerto Rico
- Frequency: 100.7 MHz (HD Radio)
- Branding: La X

Programming
- Languages: Spanish and English
- Format: Top 40/CHR

Ownership
- Owner: RAAD Broadcasting; (Raad Broadcasting Corporation)
- Sister stations: WXLX, WELX, WXHD

History
- First air date: August 14, 1964; 61 years ago
- Former call signs: WRSJ-FM (1964–1979)

Technical information
- Licensing authority: FCC
- Facility ID: 54447
- Class: B
- ERP: 50,000 watts
- HAAT: 853.0 meters (2,798.6 ft)
- Transmitter coordinates: 18°17′14.4″N 66°10′48.3″W

Links
- Public license information: Public file; LMS
- Webcast: Listen Live
- Website: lax.fm

WXYX (100.7 FM), branded on-air as La X, is a radio station broadcasting a bilingual Top 40/CHR format. Licensed to Bayamon, Puerto Rico, it serves the Puerto Rico area. The station is currently owned by Raad Broadcasting Corporation.

The station is relayed through booster stations, WXYX-FM1 in Juana Diaz and WXYX-FM2 in Ceiba, both operating at 100.7 FM.
