= B.B. King's Bluesville =

Satellite radio station

Bluesville
- Broadcast area: United States; Canada
- Frequency: Sirius XM Radio 75

Programming
- Format: Blues

Ownership
- Owner: Sirius XM Radio

History
- First air date: September 25, 2001
- Former frequencies: Sirius XM 70 (2001-2017)

Technical information
- Class: Satellite Radio Station

Links
- Website: B.B. King's Bluesville

B.B. King's Bluesville is a Sirius XM Radio channel devoted to blues music. It plays a mix of traditional blues, modern blues, rockin' blues and soul or "finger-poppin'" blues.

Bill Wax was the original program director for the channel until his departure from SiriusXM in June 2013. While playing music in the fictional town of Bluesville, Wax was often heard hanging out in Low-Fi's Bar and Pool Hall. Tony Colter plays the role of a night-time bartender at Low-Fi's.

B.B. King was the "Mayor" of Bluesville, having been dubbed as such by Bill Wax, and made several live appearances on the station. King, along with co-host Wax, had his own weekly music show on the channel that began in September 2008. The program featured a broad range of blues and gospel music hand-selected by King, along with stories about the artists and other personal anecdotes from the bluesman's epic career. The show is no longer in production but continues to be re-run on the channel.

The channel launched on XM as Bluesville in 2001; King's name was officially added on July 14, 2008. At the time it had around 4 million listeners.

On November 12, 2008, it was added to the Sirius lineup, replacing SIRIUS Blues. B.B. King's Bluesville can be heard on channel 74 on Sirius XM Radio.

In September 2020, it was announced that the Blues Foundation would offer its archives and material for future broadcasts on B.B. King's Bluesville.

== Core artists ==
- B.B. King
- Eric Clapton
- Stevie Ray Vaughan
- Muddy Waters
- Buddy Guy
- Etta James
- Robert Cray
- Joe Bonamassa
- John Lee Hooker
- Johnny Winter
- Taj Mahal
