= KKSS =

Rhythmic contemporary hit radio station in Santa Fe, New Mexico

Coordinates: 35.781°N 106.527°W

- Santa Fe, New Mexico; United States
- Broadcast area: Albuquerque metropolitan area
- Frequency: 97.3 MHz
- Branding: KISS 97.3

Programming
- Format: Rhythmic contemporary
- Affiliations: Compass Media Networks

Ownership
- Owner: American General Media; (AGM Nevada, LLC)
- Sister stations: KABG, KJFA-FM, KIOT, KKRG-FM, KLVO

History
- First air date: 1969 (as KAFE-FM)
- Former call signs: KAFE-FM (1969–1985)
- Call sign meaning: "Kiss"

Technical information
- Facility ID: 63928
- Class: C
- ERP: 100,000 watts
- HAAT: 572 meters (1,877 ft)

Links
- Webcast: Listen Live
- Website: mykiss973.com

KKSS (97.3 FM) is a commercial radio station licensed to Santa Fe, New Mexico, and broadcasting to the Santa Fe and Albuquerque metropolitan area. KKSS airs an urban-leaning rhythmic contemporary radio format branded as "Kiss 97.3" (New Mexico’s Party Station!). Owned by American General Media, its radio studios and offices are in Northeast Albuquerque (a mile north of Central Avenue).

KKSS has an effective radiated power (ERP) of 100,000 watts. The transmitter is in the Valles Caldera National Preserve in Jemez Springs, New Mexico.

== History ==
The station first signed on the air in 1969 as KAFE-FM, keeping that call sign until 1985. It was the FM counterpart to KAFE (810 AM, now KSWV) in Santa Fe.

On September 16, 1985, after upgrading the signal and acquiring new broadcasting equipment, KAFE-FM switched its call letters to KKSS. The format was initially described as being "a popular, contemporary music format which will be between the hard rock music of Q106-FM and the soft contemporary music of KOB-FM". The station was owned by New Mexico Broadcasting Inc. In 1986, KKSS and AM sister station KAFE were sold to SunGroup Broadcasting for $2.2 million.

Following SunGroup's purchase of the station, the company had surveyed the market and found that there was a demand for urban music. In March 1987, the company appointed Bill Thomas as operations manager and program director. While the format had leaned toward urban music from the start, it still featured some album rock crossovers. KKSS had struggled in the ratings during its first year on air, battling two other mainstream top 40 stations in the area, while public radio station KANW was playing mostly urban music at the time. Thomas had committed to evolving the format to make it stand out from its competitors, while also making it work in the largely Hispanic market. This would be done featuring more dance music and less R&B ballads, while still bordering on CHR in some dayparts. Thomas predicted that the format "is going to continue to erode CHR as we know it, and will continue to grow". The effort would succeed as KKSS would become the leading CHR in the area by late 1987, often ranking highest among teens and young adults. By early 1990, after competing CHR KNMQ flipped to country, KKSS saw its shares more than double, ranking it at #3 overall. It also would continue to do well throughout the 1990s with the emergence of hip-hop music.

In 1998, SunGroup had planned to sell KKSS for $6 million to Trumper Communications, which owned the 94.1, 100.3, 104.1 and 107.9 signals in the market. However, Trumper later withdrew from the deal; instead, KKSS was sold to the Simmons Media Group for $5.5 million in November 1998. While it mostly had a rhythmic contemporary sound, KKSS had detoured to mainstream Top 40 a few times, mostly when new competition came to the Albuquerque market (most of them short-lived).

In 2001, KKSS again shifted toward mainstream Top 40. In late 2002, after Univision bought the station, the station shifted back to its current Rhythmic Contemporary direction. Today, KKSS has managed to do well with its mix of R&B-hip hop and rhythmic pop product, despite competition from mainstream Top 40 rival KOBQ.

On April 4, 2014, three KKSS air staffers, including program director and midday host DJ Lopez, Johnny V, and MQ, had left the station to join KAGM. (The three were later let go in December 2015 when KAGM revamped its direction.) Former KJFA personality Julian Robles also left, moving to KLVO. This all came amidst restructuring at Univision Radio, which then had KKSS sharing on-air personalities and programming with sister station KBBT in San Antonio, Texas. KKSS would return to mostly local programming after it was sold in 2017.

On June 14, 2017, Univision announced that it would sell KKSS (as well as sister stations KIOT and KKRG-FM) to American General Media, which had attempted repeatedly to challenge KKSS over the years. AGM paid $5 million for the Univision cluster that its predecessor paid $22.5 million for in 2002 (which also included KQTM), showing a significant drop in value over 15 years. The sale was approved by the FCC on August 23, 2017, and was consummated on September 1, 2017.

== Current staff ==
- The Gina Lee Fuentez Show with Ando & Buck D (6am-10am Mornings)
- The Dana Cortez Show (10am-2pm syndicated in afternoon)
- DJ Animal "The Street King of the 505!" (2pm-7pm Afternoons)
- 5 O’Clock Traffic Jam (5pm-6pm)
- Club Kiss (Friday Night 9pm-1am)

Weekends:

- Comedian Robert "Buck D" Gipson (Saturday at 10am-4pm & Sunday at 12-5pm)
- Kiss Mix (Saturday Night)
- Slowjams with R. Dub (Sunday Night)

== Former staff ==
Mornings: Cadillac Jack, Chaz Malibu (now at KABG), Brandon Scott
Middays/Mornings: Brandon Scott
Middays: Randy Savage
Middays: DJ Lopez (until April 2014)
Afternoons: Johnny V (until April 2014)
Afternoons: JJ Morgan
Afternoons: Kumbia Show (Until March 2016)
Nights: The 'Bad Boys' Carlos D (now at KOBQ), Big Moon & DJ Trauma
Nights: Joe Mama
Nights: MQ's Neighborhood (until April 2014)
Weeknights: Boy Loco
Overnights: Kandi O
