= WXHD =

- Santa Isabel, Puerto Rico; Puerto Rico
- Broadcast area: Puerto Rico
- Frequency: 98.1 MHz (HD Radio)
- Branding: La X

Programming
- Languages: Spanish and English
- Format: Top 40/CHR

Ownership
- Owner: RAAD Broadcasting; (Amor Radio Group Corporation)
- Sister stations: WXYX, WXLX, WELX

History
- First air date: 2013; 13 years ago
- Former call signs: WSEX (2013–2016)

Technical information
- Licensing authority: FCC
- Facility ID: 77881
- Class: A
- ERP: 16,000 watts
- HAAT: 853.0 meters (2,798.6 ft)
- Transmitter coordinates: 18°51′43.1″N 66°21′31.1″W

Links
- Public license information: Public file; LMS
- Webcast: Listen Live
- Website: lax.fm

WXHD (98.1 FM), branded on-air as La X, is a radio station broadcasting a bilingual Top 40/CHR format. Licensed to Santa Isabel, Puerto Rico, it serves the Puerto Rico area. The station is currently owned by Amor Radio Group Corporation.
