= WELX =

Isabela, Puerto Rico; Puerto Rico
- Broadcast area: Puerto Rico
- Frequency: 101.5 MHz (HD Radio)
- Branding: La X

Programming
- Languages: Spanish and English
- Format: Top 40/CHR

Ownership
- Owner: RAAD Broadcasting; (La Equis Broadcasting Corp.)
- Sister stations: WXYX, WXLX, WXHD

History
- First air date: 1961; 65 years ago
- Former call signs: WISA-FM (1961–1979); WKSA-FM (1979–2009)

Technical information
- Licensing authority: FCC
- Facility ID: 29219
- Class: B
- ERP: 50,000 watts
- HAAT: 829.0 meters (2,719.8 ft)
- Transmitter coordinates: 18°26′36″N 67°58′49.9″W

Links
- Public license information: Public file; LMS
- Webcast: Listen Live
- Website: lax.fm

WELX (101.5 FM), branded on-air as La X, is a radio station broadcasting a bilingual Top 40/CHR format. Licensed to Isabela, Puerto Rico, the station serves the Puerto Rico area. The station is currently owned by La Equis Broadcasting Corp.
