= KICE (AM) =

Radio station in Bend, Oregon (1959–2017)

Bend, Oregon; United States
- Broadcast area: Bend, Oregon
- Frequency: 940 kHz

Ownership
- Owner: Gross Communications
- Operator: Sunriver Broadcasting Corporation

History
- First air date: July 16, 1959
- Last air date: March 31, 2017
- Former call signs: KGRL (1959–1994); KXUX (1994–2000); KMGX (2000); KICE (2000–2017); KCOE (2017)

Technical information
- Licensing authority: FCC
- Facility ID: 49914
- Class: D
- Power: 10,000 watts (day); 60 watts (night)
- Transmitter coordinates: 44°04′47″N 121°16′59″W

Links
- Public license information: Public file; LMS

KICE (940 AM) was a commercial radio station in Bend, Oregon. The station shut down on March 31, 2017 (bearing for its final 8 days on air the KCOE call letters); its FCC license was deleted on March 12, 2019.

== KICE history ==
KICE radio was originally (on 100.7 FM, now KMGX) a beautiful music station located in Bend, Oregon. Around 1980, in the height of the Urban Cowboy craze, KICE changed formats to 'Outlaw Country' playing such artists as: The Outlaws, New Riders of the Purple Sage, Willie and Waylon and Jerry Jeff Walker. KICE also included many traditional artists such as Patsy Cline, Merle Haggard and the Sons of the Pioneers at a time when most more commercial stations were playing more mainstream country acts.

Along with the unique country format, KICE touted an 'I'd rather be in Central Oregon' theme and concentrated on Central Oregon news and music events. KICE announcers were known as the 'Radio Rangers' who sponsored many country music events. Some best known KICE DJs were 'Rowdy Roy' Larson, 'Maverick Mark' Robbins, "Lightning Lady" Linda Evans, 'Magnum' Mike Slater, Matt James, Dallas Dobro, along with newsman R.L. Garrigus. KICE radio remained popular in the Central Oregon radio ratings until the station was sold in the late 1990s.

== 940 AM history ==
940 AM signed on the air July 22, 1959, as KGRL, a counterpart to KBOY in Medford, and aired a top 40 format in the 1970s. In 1994, the station changed its call letters to KXUX and aired an adult standards format. In 2000, it changed its call letters to KICE and began airing a sports format.

On March 23, 2017, the KICE call letters moved to 94.9 FM Terrebonne, formerly KCOE, which had been simulcasting 940 AM's Fox Sports Radio programming since going on the air in 2015. (The KCOE call letters were placed on 940.) The next day, citing the sale of its leased tower site, Sunriver Broadcast Corporation, which also leased out the station, replaced all programming on 940 AM with a loop inviting listeners to retune to 94.9, with the transmitter being shut off on March 31, 2017. On March 12, 2019, the FCC canceled the license for being silent more than a year.
