= WXLX =

Radio station in Lajas, Puerto Rico

Lajas, Puerto Rico; Puerto Rico
- Broadcast area: Puerto Rico
- Frequency: 103.7 MHz
- Branding: La X

Programming
- Languages: Spanish and English
- Format: Top 40

Ownership
- Owner: RAAD Broadcasting; (Radio X Broadcasting Corporation)
- Sister stations: WXYX, WELX, WXHD

History
- First air date: June 1995 (30 years ago)
- Former call signs: WCFI (1995–1999)

Technical information
- Licensing authority: FCC
- Facility ID: 55065
- Class: B
- ERP: 50,000 watts
- HAAT: 839.0 meters (2,752.6 ft)
- Transmitter coordinates: 17°59′29.86997″N 67°11′57.64530″W

Links
- Public license information: Public file; LMS
- Webcast: Listen Live
- Website: lax.fm/portal/

WXLX (103.7 FM), branded on-air as La X, is a radio station licensed to Lajas, Puerto Rico, the station serves the Puerto Rico area. The station is currently owned by Radio X Broadcasting Corporation.

== History ==
The station went on the air as WCFI on 1995-06-16. It is remembered for its "Radio Cofresi" moniker. on 1999-04-01 the station changed its call sign to the current WXLX.
