= KHFM =

Radio station in Santa Fe, New Mexico, US

Coordinates: 35.780°N 106.528°W

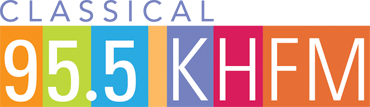
- Santa Fe, New Mexico; United States
- Broadcast area: Albuquerque metropolitan area and Northern New Mexico
- Frequency: 95.5 MHz
- Branding: Classical 95.5 KHFM

Programming
- Format: Classical music

Ownership
- Owner: KHFM Community Partners; (The American General Media Foundation)

History
- First air date: November 1954 (on 96.3 MHz); August 15, 1965 (as 95.5 KSNM)
- Former call signs: KSNM (1965–1982); KNYN (1982–1997); KBFG (1997–1998); KMMG (1998–2001)
- Call sign meaning: K Highland Frequency Modulation

Technical information
- Licensing authority: FCC
- Facility ID: 52813
- Class: C1
- ERP: 19,000 watts
- HAAT: 546 meters (1791 ft)
- Translators: 95.9 K240CN (Ruidoso); 103.1 K276ED (Roswell); 106.3 K292FW (Taos)
- Repeater: 98.5-3 KABG-HD3 (Los Alamos)

Links
- Public license information: Public file; LMS
- Webcast: Listen live
- Website: khfm.org

KHFM (95.5 FM) is a non-commercial radio station licensed to Santa Fe, New Mexico, and serving the Albuquerque metropolitan area. It airs a classical music radio format with some selections drawn from musical theatre. The studios and offices are located on Marble Avenue NE in Northeast Albuquerque. It is owned by KHFM Community Partners, a foundation set up by American General Media when the station switched from commercial to non-commercial. KHFM holds periodic fundraisers on the air during the year to support the station from listener donations.

KHFM has an effective radiated power (ERP) of 19,000 watts. The transmitter tower is in Jemez Springs, New Mexico, west of Los Alamos. KHFM can also be heard via live streaming on its website and on three FM translator stations set up to extend its range.

- K240CN 95.9 FM - Ruidoso, New Mexico - 9 watts
- K276ED 103.1 FM - Roswell, New Mexico - 36 watts
- K292FW 106.3 FM - Taos, New Mexico - 250 watts

== History of KHFM ==
=== Early years ===
KHFM was started in November 1954 as a hobby of two teachers at Highland High School, originally broadcasting at 96.3 MHz (now the dial position for KKOB-FM). KHFM was the first commercial FM station in Albuquerque. The call sign is a combination of the initials for Highland High School and Frequency Modulation, the technical term for FM radio. The teachers set up a corporation known as the CHE Broadcasting Company, with studios on Buena Vista Avenue SE. John D. Hopperton served as General Manager and Paul Leo Britt was the President.

In the 1960s, the station moved its studios to Domingo Road NE. It increased its power from 1,700 watts to 3,300 watts. In the 1970s, KHFM joined most of the other Albuquerque FM stations on a high peak outside the city, powered at 20,000 watts, to cover the city, its suburbs and Northern New Mexico. In 1987, ownership passed to New Mexico Classical Radio, Inc.

=== Change in ownership ===
In 1996, KHFM was sold to Citadel Broadcasting. Some listeners were concerned that a large broadcasting company might drop the format, which was happening in other cities around the U.S. Classical is seen as a format attracting a loyal but small and older audience, while most advertisers seek a large and youthful audience.

The classical format continued on 96.3 for five years until March 2001. At that point, Citadel decided classical music was not bringing in enough revenue, and the company made plans to drop the format in favor of classic rock.

=== Switching frequencies ===
American General Media, the owner of dozens of radio stations in the Southwestern United States including New Mexico, agreed to pick up the format for its Albuquerque station on 95.5 MHz. The call letters and classical music moved down the dial a short distance, from 96.3 to 95.5, and the station's city of license was changed from Albuquerque to Santa Fe. Citadel agreed to continue handling sales via a joint sales agreement. KHFM was relayed on FM translator K275AO at 102.9 to improve coverage in the eastern part of the city. This lasted until 2013, when AGM decided to use the translator to broadcast KARS. It later added translators in Ruidoso (K240CN 95.9), Roswell (K276ED 103.1) and Taos (K292FW 106.3).

In 2008, KHFM won the New Mexico Governors Award for excellence in the arts. At the same time American General Media had laid off several of the station's long-time staff with family members of company ownership taking over programming.

=== Non-commercial status ===
On June 14, 2017, AGM announced that it would donate KHFM to "KHFM Community Partners," a non-profit organization that planned to convert the station to a non-commercial status and retain the Classical format. It was part of a deal where AGM acquired Univision's entire Albuquerque cluster, but was required by the Federal Communications Commission to spin off four stations to meet ownership limits. Converting KHFM counted as spinning off one of the four stations.

The license was modified on September 1, 2017. Previously, KHFM had been one of the few commercial classical stations in the United States; in recent years, commercial classical stations such as WQXR-FM New York City, KDFC San Francisco, KING-FM Seattle, WCLV Cleveland and KDB-FM Santa Barbara have made similar conversions from commercial to non-commercial status.

== History of 95.5 FM ==
=== 1965-1982: Easy listening ===
The station was KSNM and went by the name "Soft Loft 95.5".

=== 1982-1998: Country ===
From 1982 to 1997, the station was known as KNYN "Canyon Country". It then changed its name to KBFG "Froggy 95.5", retaining the country format.

=== 1998-2001: Rhythmic oldies ===
The station was KMMG and went by the name "Mega 95.5".

=== 2001-present: Classical ===
The station goes by the name "Classical 95.5 KHFM".
