= KIOT =

- Los Lunas, New Mexico; United States
- Broadcast area: Albuquerque/Santa Fe and Central New Mexico
- Frequency: 102.5 MHz
- Branding: Coyote 102.5

Programming
- Format: Classic rock

Ownership
- Owner: American General Media; (AGM Nevada, LLC)
- Sister stations: KABG, KJFA-FM, KKSS, KKRG-FM, KLVO

History
- First air date: 1993 (as KOYT)
- Former call signs: KOYT (1992–1994)
- Call sign meaning: sounds like "Coyote"

Technical information
- Licensing authority: FCC
- Facility ID: 73117
- Class: C
- ERP: 21,000 watts
- HAAT: 1,242 meters (4,075 ft)
- Transmitter coordinates: 35.213°N 106.450°W

Links
- Public license information: Public file; LMS
- Webcast: Listen Live
- Website: coyote1025.com

KIOT (102.5 FM, "Coyote 102.5") is an American radio station licensed to Los Lunas, New Mexico, and serving the Albuquerque and Santa Fe radio markets broadcasting a classic rock format with music from the late 1960s through the early 2000s. The station is owned by American General Media. Its studios are located in Northeast Albuquerque (a mile north of Central Avenue) and the transmitter tower is located atop Sandia Crest east of the city.

== History ==
KIOT first launched in 1991 with an eclectic Triple-A format called "The Coyote". The callsign and format originated in late 1990 on 102.3 in Espanola after the station was purchased by KLSK founder Bill Sims and programmer Jack Kolkmeyer. The name "coyote" and KIOT callsign was selected to associate it as: "The coyote embodies the wild, free spirit that is the very soul and music of the world." KIOT used translators in Albuquerque before 102.5 signed on in 1994. The KIOT callsign moved to the Los Lunas station on August 5, 1994. In 1995 it was purchased by Simmons Media Group from Wizard Broadcasting for 1.6 million dollars. On September 1, 1995 the station switched to a classic rock format branded as "Arrow 102.5" but kept the KIOT callsign. In Fall 2002 it was sold to Hispanic Broadcasting (which later became Univision Radio in 2003) and renamed "Coyote" matching the callsign the original owners had given it but continued the classic rock format focused mostly on the 1960s and 1970s. By the late-2000s the station had added some rock tracks from the 1990s and early-2000s with a lot more 1980s rock putting it in more direct competition with KZRR "94 Rock".

In 2010, the station gave former KZRR morning co-host Erica Viking her own morning show that later also featured "Big Benny" (now at KABG) until 2013 now co-hosted by "The Hoff". In previous years the station just featured a "music in the morning" approach.

The station hosts some local live events including the annual "Rockalypse" featuring classic rock cover bands which began in 2013.

On June 14, 2017, American General Media announced that it would acquire KIOT and sister stations KKSS and KKRG-FM from Univision, making them part of a cluster with KABG, KLVO and KARS/K275AO. The sale price for the Univision cluster was $5 million, down from $22.5 million paid in 2002. The sale was approved on August 23, 2017, and consummated on September 1, 2017.

The radio station was briefly referenced in the season four premiere episode of Breaking Bad During one scene in a vehicle, a traffic report is given and the announcer says "on The Coyote". The show is set and filmed in Albuquerque.
