= KKRG-FM =

Radio station in Santa Fe, New Mexico

- Santa Fe, New Mexico; United States
- Broadcast area: Santa Fe, Albuquerque and surrounding areas
- Frequency: 105.1 MHz
- Branding: Mix 105.1

Programming
- Format: Hot adult contemporary

Ownership
- Owner: American General Media; (AGM Nevada, LLC)
- Sister stations: KABG, KIOT, KJFA-FM, KKSS, KLVO

History
- First air date: 1985 (as KIVA)
- Former call signs: KIVA (1985–1987); KIVA-FM (1987–1992); KZRQ (1992–1997); KRZN (1997–1999); KCHQ (1999–2001); KRQS (2001–2002); KAJZ-FM (2002); KAJZ (2002–2004); KKRG (2004–2006); KJFA (2006–2015)
- Call sign meaning: Station was formerly branded as "The Range" with an extra K

Technical information
- Licensing authority: FCC
- Facility ID: 7051
- Class: C
- ERP: 100,000 watts
- HAAT: 578 meters (1,896 ft)
- Transmitter coordinates: 35.780°N 106.527°W

Links
- Public license information: Public file; LMS
- Webcast: Listen Live
- Website: mymix1051.com

KKRG-FM (105.1 MHz) is a radio station licensed to Santa Fe, New Mexico, covering the Albuquerque area and northern New Mexico. It is currently owned by American General Media. It airs a hot adult contemporary format with an emphasis on 1990s and 2000s hits. Its studios are located in Northeast Albuquerque (a mile north of Central Avenue) and the transmitter tower is located west of Los Alamos, New Mexico. Syndicated programming includes Brooke & Jeffrey in the morning and Liveline with Mason on Saturday night.

== History ==
=== KIVA (1985–1991) ===
105.1 FM signed on in Fall 1985 as KIVA with a hot adult contemporary format in an effort to challenge KOB-FM. The station was owned by Constant Communications. In November 1986, Constant sold KIVA to the Daytona Group for $1.9 million (at auction). KIVA would then shift to a Top 40 format and rebranded as "Power 105". Daytona would then purchase KXAK for $425,000 in May 1987. KXAK became KIVA, while 105.1 became KIVA-FM, and would simulcast the programming in AM stereo for about a year. On December 1, 1989, the station would replace the local programming with a satellite delivered format called "The Heat" from Satellite Music Networks in Dallas, Texas, while 20 employees at the station were laid off. However, ratings for the station would fall near the bottom by 1991, while KKSS would rank near the top. In December 1991, Daytona sold KIVA-FM and KZRQ (the former KIVA) to Star of New Mexico for $300,000. At this time, the Top 40 format would be replaced by SMN's Z-Rock network, which played Hard rock and Heavy metal music.

=== Z-Rock (1991–1996) ===
Z-Rock had aired locally on then sister-station 1310 AM since September 8, 1988. Although a "narrow casting" effort, the station intended to capitalized on the local popularity of rock and metal. In 1992, the call letters of both stations were switched, with 105.1 becoming KZRQ and the KIVA callsign moving to 1310, which had launched an Adult Standards format that April. It was around this time that Z-Rock would also begin to pick up more FM affiliates around the country under programming director Lee Abrams. While the format was national, there would be some local features on the station, as well as some local bands. In July 1993, Star Management sold KZRQ and KIVA to Territorial Communications for $900,000, with KZRQ forming an FM duopoly with oldies formatted KZKL. Throughout 1995, KZRQ featured a local "night shift" program from 6 p.m. until midnight. In November 1995, Territorial Communications would enter into a merger with Simmons Media Group to acquire the two AM and two FM stations. KZRQ was placed into a sales management agreement while awaiting a relaxation of ownership limits in 1996, as Simmons had just purchased KIOT. In April 1996, Simmons would buy out 80% of Territorial for $5 million.

=== Many changes (1996–2006) ===
In January 1996, Simmons discontinued the Z-Rock affiliation, and flipped KZRQ to a Hot Adult Contemporary format branded as "Star 105", attempting to challenge the more established KKOB-FM. Later, the format would briefly shift to Rhythmic AC; however, the format wouldn't last long due to low ratings.

In May 1997, KZRQ would pick up the smooth jazz format moved over from 101.3 FM, as well as the KRZN callsign, and the "Horizon" branding. The new signal made the format available to Santa Fe and other surrounding communities. However, after two years and being unable to turn a profit, "The Horizon" ended in April 1999.

KRZN then switched to a mainstream top 40/CHR format, branded as "Channel 105one", becoming the first mainstream CHR station in the market in six years, with the format enjoying a resurgence nationally at that time. The callsign then changed to KCHQ. KKOB-FM would also pick up a top 40 format soon after, and the two stations would be in a head-to-head battle in the ratings. On November 7, 2000, the same day as the 2000 United States presidential election, KCHQ would change to an all-80's hits format while keeping the "Channel" brand. KKOB-FM would also change to the all-80's format in early 2001, putting the two stations in direct competition once again, with sister station KKSS picking up the top 40/CHR format in March 2001.

Simmons, meanwhile, had revived the smooth jazz format and "Horizon" branding on 101.3 FM in December 2000. It would once again be moved back to 105.1 FM in November 2001, along with the call letters KRQS. In 2002, Simmons would sell its FM radio stations to Hispanic Broadcasting Company for $22.5 million. HBC would keep the smooth jazz format on 105.1 FM, but would change the call letters to KAJZ. By April 2004, the "Horizon" format would move over to the weaker 101.7 FM signal. HBC became Univision Radio in 2003.

After KAJZ's move, the station flipped to classic country, reviving a format that had previously aired on 101.3 FM from late 2001 until November 2002, when HBC acquired the FM station cluster. The KKRG call letters would be picked up, and the station would be branded as "The Range". While "The Range" had good ratings, Univision had dropped the format in March 2006 in favor of its "Recuerdo" Mexican oldies format. By the end of that year, Univision would switch formats, moving Regional Mexican KJFA to 105.1 FM, while "Recuerdo" and the KKRG call letters moved to 101.3 FM.

=== La Jefa (2006–2015) ===
KJFA logo

Following the switch to KJFA, the station would enjoy a long period of stability. The Piolin morning program was added at the beginning of 2007 as part of the effort to make the station more competitive with KLVO ("Lobo"). These changes helped make KJFA the new top Arbitron rated Spanish-language radio station in Albuquerque and created a more competitive battle with the long running "Lobo" until that station dropped the format in January 2011. (The format and brand was revived in November 2012.)

On July 22, 2013, Univision cancelled the Piolin program. KJFA experienced a drop in ratings and was in a low rated battle with KLVO; then adult hits-formatted KRZY-FM often led among Spanish-language radio stations in the market during this time. In addition, Piolin was picked up by KLVO in January 2015, resulting in a surge in ratings for that station. (Piolin has since moved to middays on Entravision-owned KRZY-FM.)

=== 2015-present ===
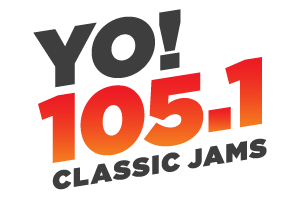
Former logo as Yo! 105.1

On September 28, 2015, KJFA moved back to 101.3 FM after nearly nine years; concurrently, KKRG-FM's call letters and classic hip-hop format moved to 105.1 FM. The station would be branded as "Yo! 105.1".

On June 14, 2017, American General Media announced that it would acquire KKRG-FM (along with sister stations KKSS and KIOT), joining a cluster that includes KABG, KLVO and KARS/K275AO. The sale price for the Univision cluster was $5 million, about $17 million less than it paid in 2002. The sale was approved on August 23, 2017, and consummated on September 1.

On October 31, 2017, KKRG began stunting with Christmas music as "Santa 105.1." On December 26, the station returned to Hot AC as "Mix 105.1".

On June 13, 2025, at 5 p.m., after playing "Closing Time" by Semisonic, KKRG began stunting, running jockless mixes of primarily 1990s and 2000s pop music, punctuated with sweepers narrated by morning hosts Brooke and Jeffrey teasing that the "Mix" format was being "re-mixed" and the new version would debut the following Monday, the 16th, at 10:51 a.m.. The Hot AC format had failed in competing with rival outlet KPEK, ending with a 1.1 share of the April 2025 Nielsen Audio market ratings, far behind that of KPEK's 3.8. At the time promised (at which point the stunt had shifted to a repeated loop of "Changes" by David Bowie and "Changes" by Tupac Shakur), the "Mix" branding was relaunched with a 1990s/2000s hits format branded as "Feel Good Throwbacks", launching with "Let's Get It Started" by The Black Eyed Peas and "Get the Party Started" by P!nk.

On November 20, 2025, at 5 p.m. KKRG began playing Christmas music and position itself as "MixMas 105.1" "New Mexico's NEW Home for Christmas". KKRG-FM had used Christmas music as a "stunt" prior to changing formats in the past; as in previous such stunts, no change took place. On December 26, 2025 at 12:00 midnight they returned as "Mix 105.1" Feel Good Throwbacks.

== Current Staff ==
Weekdays

- Brooke & Jeffrey (6am-11am mornings)
- Corina Delgado (11am-3pm afternoons)
- Jonathan "J Steele" Steele (3pm-7pm evenings)
- Chris Cruise (7pm-11pm nights)

Saturdays

- Throwback 2K with Chris Cruise (7am-12pm)
- Liveline with Mason (7pm-12am)
