= KQTM =

ESPN Radio affiliate in Rio Rancho–Albuquerque, New Mexico

Coordinates: 35.193°N 106.471°W

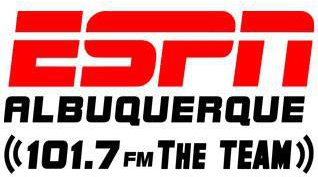
- Rio Rancho, New Mexico; United States
- Broadcast area: Albuquerque, New Mexico
- Frequency: 101.7 MHz
- Branding: ESPN Sports Radio 101-7 The Team

Programming
- Format: Sports
- Affiliations: ESPN Radio; Dallas Cowboys; Los Angeles Dodgers; New Mexico Lobos; New Mexico United; New York Yankees

Ownership
- Owner: Team Broadcasting

History
- First air date: 1984 (as KZIA-FM)
- Former call signs: KZIA-FM (1984–1989); KZKL (1989); KZKL-FM (1989–2000); KQEO (2000–2002); KOSZ (June 2002 – Nov 2002); KVVF (2002–2004); KAJZ (2004–2005); KQBT (2005–2008)
- Call sign meaning: K Q TeaM

Technical information
- Licensing authority: FCC
- Facility ID: 65256
- Class: A
- ERP: 3,000 watts
- HAAT: 30 meters (98 ft)

Links
- Public license information: Public file; LMS
- Webcast: Listen Live
- Website: www.1017theteam.com

KQTM (101.7 FM, "The Team") is a radio station serving the Albuquerque, New Mexico, area. They are owned by Team Broadcasting and its city of license is Rio Rancho, New Mexico. The station broadcasts with an effective radiated power of 3 kW.

The station broadcasts a sports format as "The Team" as of August 1, 2008.

== History ==
101.7 signed on the air in 1984 as talk outlet KZIA-FM, a sister to news station 1580 KZIA. KZIA-FM featured the ABC Talkradio network lineup which included Michael Jackson (English Accented talk show host not musician) Owen Spann, Ira Fistell, Ray Briem.

In 1989 it became KZKL-FM with a 1950s and 1960s oldies format branded as "Kool 102". The station became very popular for much of the 1990s and would last for more than a decade. In 2000 it had rebranded as KQEO, a callsign that had once been used by a local AM top 40 station during the 60's until about the early 1990s. However, by that time it was battling KABG-FM 98.5.

After 13 years, in May 2002, KZKL flipped to soft adult contemporary as KOSZ "Cozy 101.7". However, the format lasted just five months as the result of Simmons Media Group selling its FM stations to Hispanic Broadcasting Corporation. The deal closed that November, at which time 101.7 flipped to a Spanish adult contemporary format called "Viva 101.7" under new call letters KVVF. After underperforming, "Viva" was dropped in April 2004, and smooth jazz outlet KAJZ "The Horizon", which was broadcasting on 105.1, was moved to 101.7 to make way for a new classic country format on that frequency. But in October 2005, The Horizon was dropped and changed to KQBT.

Initially, KQBT had a rhythmic oldies format as "101.7 The Beat" but shifted to rhythmic adult contemporary (AC) in the summer of 2006 and re-branding as "B 101.7" adding current rhythmic hits and phasing out most of the pre-1980 songs it had previously played after the format generated low ratings. However it had since returned to playing mostly 1970s and 1980s rhythmic hits and continued to generate low ratings. The slogan used was "Albuquerque JAMZ from back in the day!".

The KQBT call letters originated on an Austin, Texas radio station now called KUTX, also nicknamed "The Beat".

On May 15, 2008, KQBT was sold to Team Communications, which replaced the rhythmic AC format with sports talk after the deal was completed in August.

== Programming ==
KQTM is an affiliate of the ESPN Radio network. It is also the local affiliate for the Dallas Cowboys, Los Angeles Dodgers (on the Los Angeles Dodgers Radio Network), the New Mexico State Aggies, New Mexico Lobos baseball, and APS Athletics (local high school). The station broadcasts Major League Baseball games as a member of the ESPN Radio network. As of spring 2010, the station began broadcasting University of New Mexico baseball games. KQTM is home to Bob Brown and former University of New Mexico sports broadcaster Mike Roberts.
