= KABG =

- Los Alamos, New Mexico; United States
- Broadcast area: Santa Fe - Albuquerque
- Frequency: 98.5 MHz (HD Radio)
- Branding: Big 98.5

Programming
- Format: Classic hits
- Subchannels: HD2: KJFA-FM simulcast HD3: KHFM simulcast
- Affiliations: United Stations Radio Networks

Ownership
- Owner: American General Media
- Sister stations: KHFM, KIOT, KJFA-FM, KKRG-FM, KKSS, KLVO

History
- First air date: 1956 (as KRSN)
- Former call signs: KRSN (1956–1986); KKBR (1986–1990); KRBL (1990–1993); KTMN (1993–1997)
- Call sign meaning: Albuquerque Big

Technical information
- Licensing authority: FCC
- Facility ID: 44000
- Class: C
- ERP: 14,000 watts
- HAAT: 1,242 meters (4,075 ft)
- Transmitter coordinates: 35.213°N 106.450°W

Links
- Public license information: Public file; LMS
- Webcast: Listen Live
- Website: big985.com

KABG (98.5 FM) is a commercial radio station licensed to Los Alamos, New Mexico, and serving the Santa Fe and Albuquerque radio markets. It is owned by American General Media and airs a classic hits radio format, playing Top 40 hits mostly from the late 1970s to the early 1990s. The radio studios and offices are located in Northeast Albuquerque.

The transmitter is on Sandia Crest at an effective radiated power (ERP) of 14,000 watts.

== History ==
This station signed on in 1956 as KRSN-FM. For nearly three decades, the station broadcast at low wattage and only covered Los Alamos. It would enter the Albuquerque radio market in November 1985, when the transmitter moved to the Valles Caldera National Preserve in Jemez Springs, New Mexico at an effective radiated power (ERP) of 100,000 watts, the maximum for non-grandfathered FM stations where the station would operate until 2022. It launched as KKHJ with an adult contemporary format after upgrading to a 100,000 watt signal. Shortly after, the station, which was owned by Community Broadcasting Co., would be sold to KKBR Inc. for $1.2 million. In August 1986, it changed to KKBR, (AKA "The Bear") and broadcast an eclectic mix of Classic Rock and Alternative Album Rock for several months (patterned after KFOG in San Francisco) before switching to a satellite delivered 50s and 60s oldies format when economic hard times hit the station. The format would be a top rated success in the Santa Fe market.

However, despite the success in Santa Fe, the Utah based owners would focus their efforts on the Albuquerque market, which had much more revenue potential. In March 1990, 98.5 would change to KRBL, and flipped to an Album-oriented rock format called "The Rebel Rocker", targeting a younger audience in Albuquerque. This would also prompt KBOM (106.7 FM) to change from a Spanish contemporary format to oldies shortly after. Later on, with new competition following KZRQ (an affiliate of the Z-Rock network) moving to the 105.1 FM frequency in late 1991 replacing a top 40 format, KRBL would move to pick up the mainstream CHR/Top 40 format, rebranding as "Lazer 98.5" in June 1992. A year later, in June 1993, 98.5 would go dark in order to move to a new transmitter as well as to new studios in Santa Fe. This came as the station would be sold to Plaza Broadcasting, which also owned country formatted KNYN for $650,000.

Following consummation, the station returned to the air in early November 1993 as KTMN, and would air a Classic Rock format called "The Mountain". After KIOT dropped Adult Album Alternative for classic rock in Fall of 1995, KTMN shifted its programming to fill the AAA void while continuing to use "The Mountain" brand. In 1996, KNYN and KTMN were sold to American General Media. AGM would retain the formats on both stations and operate them from Santa Fe for another year. However, by 1997, AGM would move its operations to Albuquerque, and would then change the format to oldies and call letters to KABG in June in another attempt to generate better ratings in Albuquerque.

=== KABG ===
KABG launched in the Summer of 1997, as "Big Oldies 98.5". It then went on to overcome two other long running oldies stations in the Albuquerque and Santa Fe markets, KBOM (moved to 94.7 in 2000, both frequencies which AGM had later purchased) in Santa Fe and KZKL (later changed to KQEO) in Albuquerque, which dropped the format in 2002, making KABG the only FM oldies station in both markets. Local radio veteran Bobby Box would host the morning shift for several years, and would help make the station more popular with its target audience.

For many years, the station had been known as "Big Oldies". In 2007, it rebranded to just "Big 98.5", phasing out the word "oldies", as it has followed most other oldies stations across the country in shifting to a more 1970s focused "classic hits" format in order to improve its audience in the 25-54 age range demographic. Despite this, the station still played a small amount of 1950s/early 1960s oldies for a few more years. Today, the format is mostly focused on music from the 1980s with a small amount of music from the 1990s added.

On September 20, 2019, KABG was granted a construction permit to move its broadcasting facility to Sandia Crest at 13,800 watts. A license to cover was filed on August 2, 2022 and granted on August 11.

== Previous logos ==
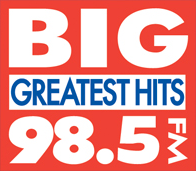
