= KDJA =

Radio station in Terrebonne–Bend, Oregon

- Terrebonne, Oregon; United States
- Broadcast area: Bend, Oregon
- Frequency: 94.9 MHz
- Branding: The Dove

Programming
- Format: Contemporary Christian; religious

Ownership
- Owner: TheDove Media Inc.

History
- First air date: 2015; 11 years ago (as KCOE)
- Former call signs: KCOE (2015–2017); KICE (2017–2022)

Technical information
- Licensing authority: FCC
- Facility ID: 190435
- Class: C2
- ERP: 2,400 watts
- HAAT: 582 m (1,909 ft)
- Transmitter coordinates: 44°26′17″N 120°57′12″W

Links
- Public license information: Public file; LMS
- Webcast: Listen Live
- Website: www.thedove.us

KDJA (94.9 FM) is a radio station licensed to serve the community of Terrebonne, Oregon. The station is owned by TheDove Media Inc.

== History ==
After Sunriver Broadcasting Corporation won the station at auction in 2012 with a high bid of $53,000, KCOE initially received Program Test Authority to operate on 106.5 MHz on August 31, 2015, but was then ordered by the Federal Communications Commission to immediately halt its broadcasts because the new station interfered with air-to-ground aviation communications. In the wake of the order from the FCC, Sunriver filed to change KCOE's frequency to 94.9 MHz and began operating on that frequency on October 27, 2015. It simulcast the sports radio programming of KCOE 940.

On March 24, 2017, Sunriver switched the call letters of the AM and FM stations, with the FM becoming KICE. It then proceeded to shut down the 940 AM facility, which broadcast from a leased tower site that had been sold, with the AM looping a message to invite listeners to retune to 94.9 FM.

In August 2020, KICE was sold to The Dove Media, and in October 2020, KICE switched from sports to a simulcast of religious-formatted KDOV 91.7 FM Medford. The sale was consummated on October 26, 2020, at a price of $315,000.

On June 11, 2022, the station changed call letters to KDJA.
