= Eddie "Piolín" Sotelo =

Mexican-American radio personality

- Born: December 1, 1972 (age 53); Ocotlán, Jalisco, Mexico
- Occupation: Radio broadcaster
- Years active: 2003–present

Eddie "Piolín" Sotelo (born December 1, 1972) is a Mexican radio broadcaster. He is the host of the nationally syndicated radio show El Show De Piolín on Entravision. His nickname means "Tweety" in Mexican Spanish, a nickname he acquired as a child. Fans of his and his cast also call him "papuchón", which means "big daddy".

== Early life ==
Sotelo was born in Ocotlán, Jalisco, on December 1, 1972. He moved to the United States with his family when he was 6 years old in 1978. He graduated from Saddleback High School in Santa Ana, California in 1990.

== Career ==
In 2003, Piolín became host of Piolín Por La Mañana. The morning radio show was broadcast entirely in Spanish for a Spanish-speaking audience and was nationally syndicated to 50 markets. In 2006, the Los Angeles Times ranked Sotelo among the 100 most powerful people in Southern California.

Piolín was removed from Univision Radio on July 22, 2013, after the Los Angeles Times reported allegations of sexual harassment, claims that Sotelo denied.

SiriusXM launched “Piolín” Radio in 2013, and in 2014, he launched his current show El Show de Piolin on 40 radio stations.

Piolín was inducted into the Radio Hall of Fame in 2013.
