= KDNF =

- Belen, New Mexico; United States
- Broadcast area: Albuquerque area
- Frequency: 840 kHz
- Branding: Genuine Country

Programming
- Format: Classic Country

Ownership
- Owner: Sheila and Derek Underhill; (KD Radio Inc.)
- Sister stations: KDSK (AM), KDSK-FM, KMIN

History
- First air date: 1961 (as KARS at 860)
- Former call signs: KARS (1961–2017); KJFA (2017–2023)
- Former frequencies: 860 kHz (1961–2013)

Technical information
- Licensing authority: FCC
- Facility ID: 25528
- Class: D
- Power: 1,800 watts (day); 30 watts (night)
- Transmitter coordinates: 35°00′31″N 106°42′52″W

Links
- Public license information: Public file; LMS

KDNF (840 AM) is a radio station licensed to Belen, New Mexico, United States, which also serves the Albuquerque area. The station is owned by Sheila and Derek Underhill, through licensee KD Radio Inc. KDNF airs a classic country format branded as "Genuine Country 840".

The transmitter tower for KDNF is located in South Valley, New Mexico.

== History ==
This station (originally KARS) used to broadcast at 860 kHz at 1,300 watts during the day and 185 watts at night. The signal in Albuquerque had been a bit weak there during daytime hours and was even harder (but not impossible) to hear at night due to its transmitter being located near Belen (about 40 miles south of Albuquerque) and using low levels of power. However, the station mostly served the Valencia County area and did not really target Albuquerque.

KARS featured a variety of programming over the years, from Classic Country and Spanish-language programming, as well as community information for Belen and other parts of Valencia County. In 2010, it began airing an Adult Standards format, and later featured some religious programs before changing to the all-news format in April 2012. The station used to brand itself as "The Heart of New Mexico".

From April 2012 until March 2013, KARS broadcast an all news format with most of its content coming from Talk Radio Network's "America's Radio News". Local news, weather and traffic reports were featured in the mornings and afternoons.

KARS had filed an application with the U.S. Federal Communications Commission to move to 840 kHz at a new transmitter site, increase day power to 1,800 watts and decrease night power to 30 watts. A construction permit to make these changes was granted by the FCC on January 17, 2013. This upgrade also allowed for it to re-broadcast on translator K275AO (102.9 FM) at 990 watts from atop Sandia Crest.

On March 28, 2013, KARS went off the air while the station upgraded its signal. It returned to the air on July 11, 2013 at 840 kHz, covering the Albuquerque area well during the day and improving night time coverage. The FM translator at 102.9 was also upgraded from 10 watts to 99 watts. 102.9 had previously re-broadcast the classical music format from KHFM since signing on in late 2005. The translator was intended to improve coverage in the northeast heights. After a week of informing listeners that KHFM was no longer on the translator, the station had been playing a loop of the theme from Close Encounters of the Third Kind repeatedly for nearly five days. KARS launched a modern rock format branded as "Area 102.9" at noon on July 24, 2013. "Area" launched with "10,000 songs in a row"; however, it was nearly four months before the station started to run commercials regularly, as is sometimes common with new stations. The modern rock format originally featured alternative music from the 1980s to current hits.

On August 3, 2015, American General Media took over operations of KSFE in Santa Fe, which could possibly allow for more flexibility to upgrade the translator, which at the current 99 watts, is tightly placed between KIOT and KDRF, both of which broadcast at the full 22 kW from atop Sandia Crest, making the signal hard to pick up and possibly contributing to the station's very low ratings. Currently, only K229CL (93.7 FM) uses the translator maximum power of 250 watts between two full powered Crest stations.

On August 31, 2015, KARS shifted its format from modern rock to active rock, still branded as "Area 102.9", with the new slogan "Shut Up and Rock". The ratings had improved with this format, but still remained low.

On September 18, 2017, KARS picked up the Regional Mexican format that had aired on KJFA-FM, which had been spun off to Vanguard Media after American General Media acquired stations owned by Univision Radio. On October 25, 2017, the call sign was changed to KJFA.

=== La Jefa ===
"La Jefa" has been in the market since November 2002, first launching on 101.3 and then moving to 105.1 at the end of 2006. The addition of the Piolin morning program was effective in the stations success for a number of years until it was canceled by Univision Radio in July 2013. By September 28, 2015, the format moved back to 101.3, which lasted until moving to its current home two years later.

=== Exito/Fuego ===
On February 27, 2018, KJFA changed its format from regional Mexican to Spanish AC, branded as "Exitos 102.9".

On August 30, 2019, at noon, KJFA and KJFA-FM flipped to Spanish language rhythmic branded as "Fuego 102.9".

=== Sale and flip to classic country ===
On March 2, 2023, American General Media sold KJFA to KD Radio, owners of KDSK for $50,000. Translator K275AO was not part of the sale and in April 2023, the "Fuego" format was added as an HD Radio subchannel of KABG as KABG-HD2, which became the new program source for K275AO. On June 1, 2023, the station changed to KDNF and launched a new format playing Classic Country music.

== Previous Logo ==
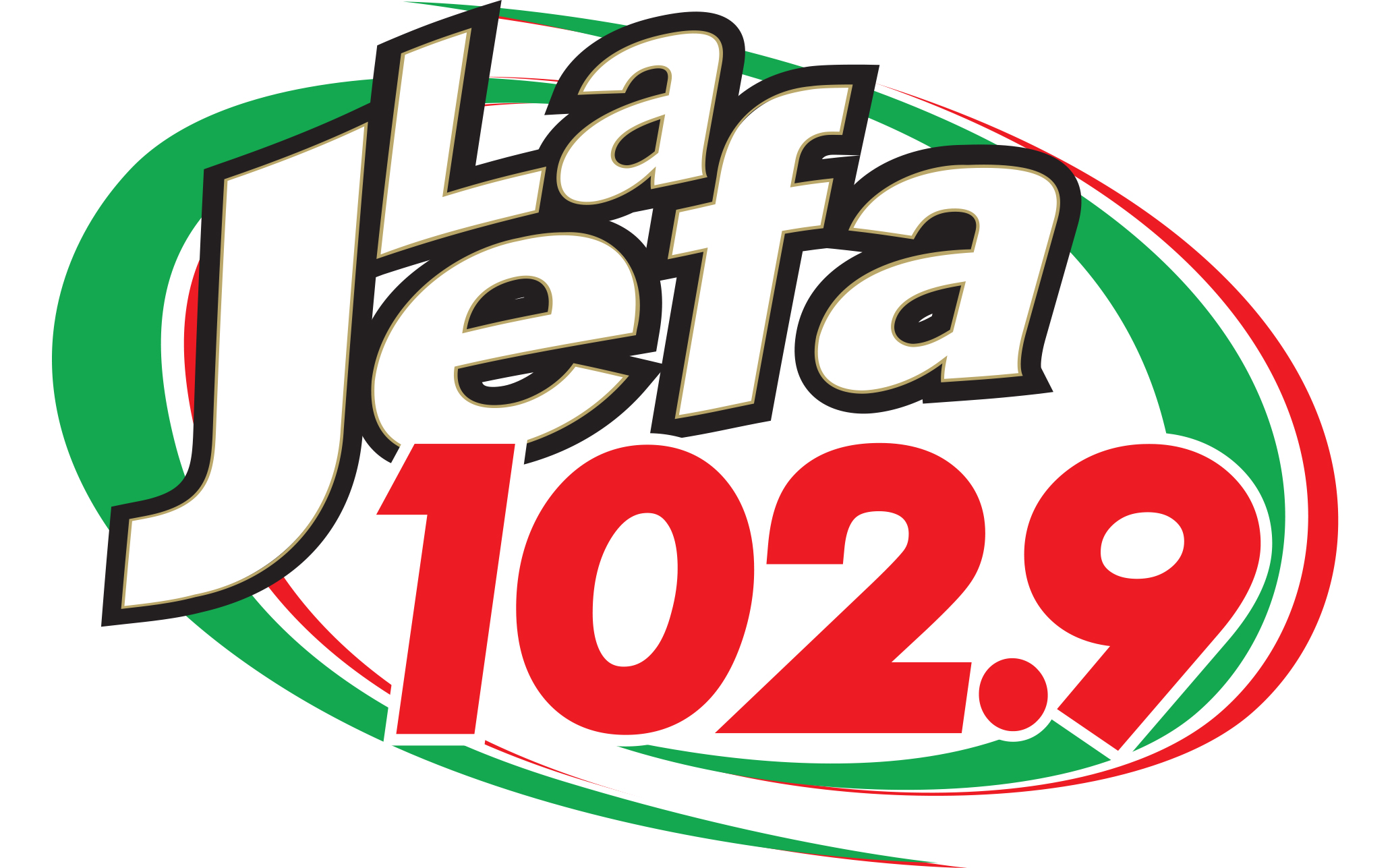
