= KJFA-FM =

Coordinates: 35.652°N 105.555°W

- Pecos, New Mexico; United States
- Broadcast area: Santa Fe, New Mexico
- Frequency: 102.9 MHz
- Branding: Fuego 102.9

Programming
- Format: Hispanic rhythmic

Ownership
- Owner: American General Media
- Sister stations: KABG, KIOT, KKRG-FM, KKSS, KLVO

History
- First air date: 2002
- Former call signs: KTRL (1999–2002, CP); KENC (2002–2003); KLBU (2003–2015); KSFE (2015–2017); KSFE-FM (2017)
- Call sign meaning: Former "La Jefa" brand

Technical information
- Licensing authority: FCC
- Facility ID: 83297
- Class: C3
- ERP: 3,700 watts
- HAAT: 209 meters (686 ft)
- Repeaters: 98.5 KABG-HD2 (Los Alamos); 102.9 KJFA-FM3 (Santa Fe)

Links
- Public license information: Public file; LMS
- Webcast: Listen Live
- Website: fuego1029.com

KJFA-FM (102.9 MHz) is a radio station licensed to Pecos, New Mexico, branded as Fuego 102-9, and serving the Santa Fe area. It broadcasts a bilingual Hispanic rhythmic format.

== History ==
=== KENC – Enchantment FM 102.9 ===
102.9 FM signed on in August 2002 as KENC, "Enchantment FM 102.9", under Meadows Media, programmed by Jim Duncan, which aired an eclectic music format made up of jazz (without much smooth jazz), classical, world music, blues, folk, and bluegrass, as well as Adult Album Alternative. Jim Duncan's goal was to create a radio station which featured music not heard on most commercial radio stations. The signal was very poor throughout its coverage area; it suffered interference from KRGN in Amarillo, Texas and KAZX in Kirtland, New Mexico. Many adjustments and minor modifications were made to the transmitter site, however the signal never improved satisfactorily. A 2,400 watt booster was added in May 2003 on a cellsite about 1 mile northwest of Santa Fe.

Will Sims, the managing partner of KENC, began searching for a buyer for 102.9 FM. Ken Christensen, chief operating officer of Blu Ventures based in Fort Myers, Florida, was looking to buy a Santa Fe radio station. Blu Ventures owns a chain of three sushi bars in Florida named Blu Sushi, which are known for their Chill inspired atmosphere. Blu Ventures also owns radioio.com, an internet radio site. Santa Fe was the chosen market because of its eclectic mix of people and its "unique creative energy that radiates outwardly across the US". In November 2003, KENC and the office on Cordova Road were sold to Blu Ventures.

=== KLBU – Blu 102.9 ===
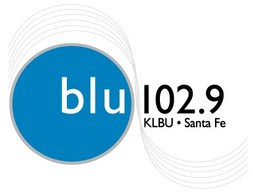
Logo as "Blu 102.9"

"Enchantment FM" came to an end at midnight on November 19, and Blu 102.9 was launched. Karen Sanchez became KLBU's general manager. The call letters were changed to KLBU and the format still contained Jazz and World Music, but was adjusted to include Chill, Lounge, Acid Jazz, Trip hop, House, and softer Dance Hits, as well as Smooth Jazz and Bossa Nova. With the format shift, all of the classical, blues, folk, and bluegrass was removed from the playlist. Chill, of course, was the most dominant genre in the new format. The music played on "Blu" had a bit more energy than music played on a traditional smooth jazz radio station. Many of the songs played were instrumental, but some tracks contained vocals as well. Other songs featured vocal sound samples. "Blu" was given the slogan Santa Fe's Choice for Chill.

"Blu" also aired a replay of BBC Radio 1's "Gilles Peterson Worldwide" on Sunday and Wednesday nights, hosted by British DJ Gilles Peterson. "Blu" also began to broadcast live from a local nightclub; the program was called "The Blu Room", which featured local and international mix DJ's who spun live on the air on Friday nights. "Blu" also had several daytime personalities, including Joann Orner (also known as "The Lunch Lady").

In July 2005, General Manager Karen Sanchez was fired.

Just before the summer of 2007, KLBU began operating under Hutton Broadcasting via LMA while still under ownership of Blu Ventures. After the LMA began, KLBU discontinued airing any programming and began running on automation full-time. As it was running on automation, the format slowly began changing, including more Jazz and Rhythmic titles, and less Electronica. At this point, it was known that KLBU would be sold to Hutton Broadcasting. In September, KLBU stopped streaming online and song titles were no longer displayed on the station's website.

In October 2007, KLBU was officially sold to Hutton. Management stated that no big changes were planned, but the format would "evolve" to include other genres. Hutton also purchased KWRP-FM (formerly "Indie 101.5", now KVSF-FM) and KBAC. KLBU also moved out from its original location on Cordova Road to Hutton Broadcasting's building on Camino Estrada.

In September 2010, the format changed to playing various rhythmic sounds including pop, urban, dance, rhythmic alternative, and rhythmic hits from the 80's through today. It had also begun streaming its live broadcast on the internet again. The new slogan was "The Beat of Santa Fe".

=== Juan 102.9/Radio Lobo/La Jefa ===
On June 1, 2013, the station changed formats to Spanish-language adult hits, branded as "Juan 102.9", featuring hits from the 1970s–2000's. The format was programmed by SparkNet Communications.

In April 2015, Hutton and American General Media agreed to swap stations, with KKIM-FM (a stronger 100 kW signal) going to Hutton and KLBU going to AGM. It was speculated that this would give AGM more flexibility in upgrading translator K275AO in Albuquerque, which currently simulcasts the same format from KARS. However, on June 30, 2015, the callsign on the booster for 102.9 in Santa Fe was changed to KSFE-1, while KLBU-1 was assigned to the 94.7 booster; KLBU remained the callsign for 102.9 and KKIM-FM for 94.7 until July 31. References to "Juan 102.9" had also been removed from santafe.com.

On July 31, 2015, KLBU changed their call letters to KSFE and changed their format to a simulcast of regional Mexican-formatted KLVO, branded as "Radio Lobo".

On September 18, 2017, KSFE switched from a simulcast of KLVO to one of KARS (also on translator K275AO (102.9 FM) in Albuquerque) with the same format, branded as "La Jefa", which moved from KJFA in Albuquerque following American General Media's acquisition of the Univision Radio cluster. On October 18, 2017, KSFE changed their call sign to KSFE-FM, and on October 25, 2017, to KJFA-FM.

=== Exitos 102.9 ===
On February 26, 2018, the trimulcasts of KJFA-AM/FM and K275AO flipped to Spanish Top 40/CHR as “Exitos 102.9.” The move was done to help serve as a flanker for KLVO, and to reduce the overlapping of two Regional Mexican outlets, thus giving KLVO exclusivity to the latter.

On August 30, 2019, at Noon, KJFA-FM and KJFA flipped to Spanish language rhythmic, branded as "Fuego 102.9".

== Current Staff ==
Weekdays

- ShoBoy Show (7am-11am mornings)
- Adri Al Aire (11am-3pm afternoons)
- Rico Rich (3pm-7pm evenings)

Saturdays

- La Mezcla Fuego (10pm-12am)

== Previous logos ==
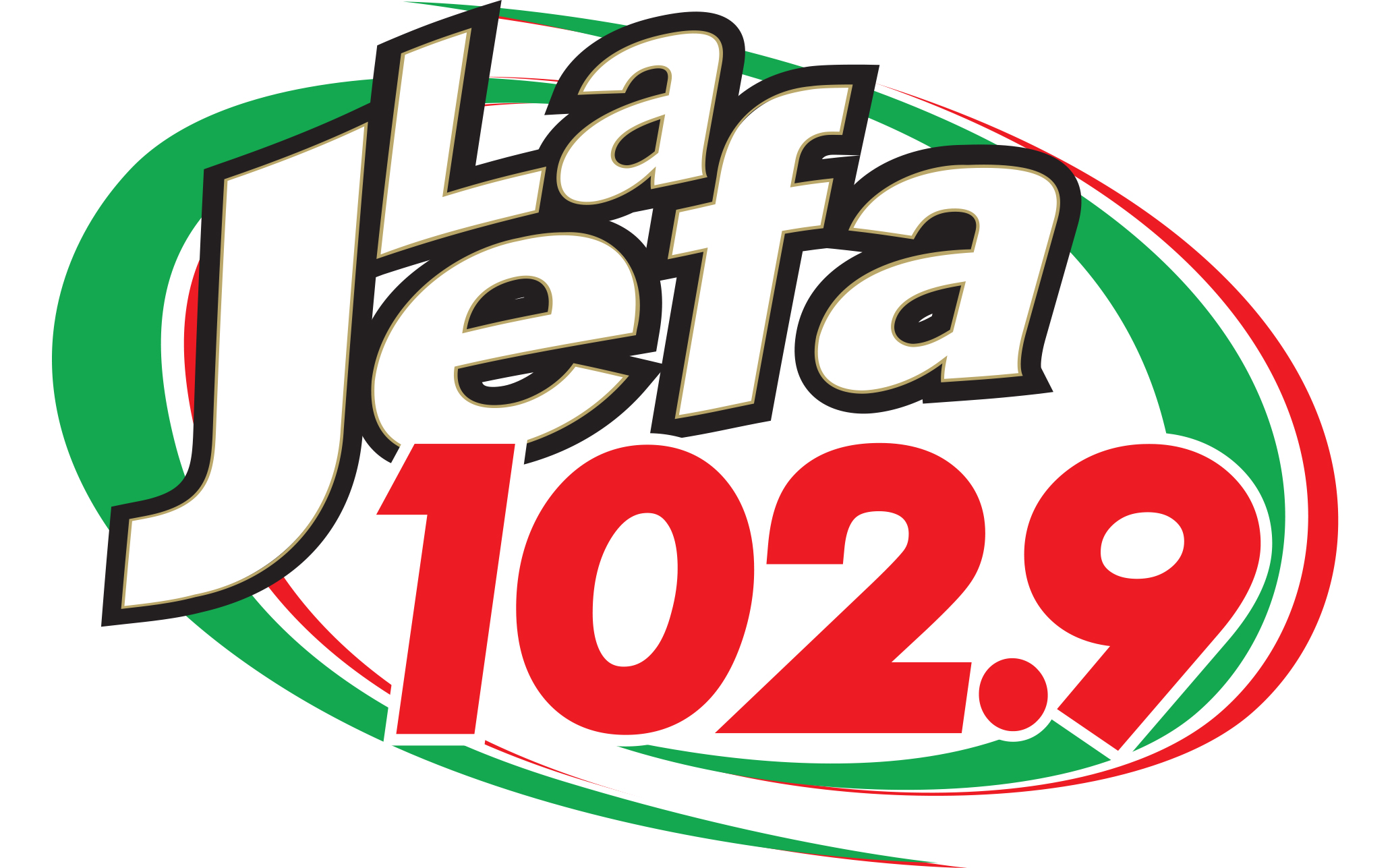
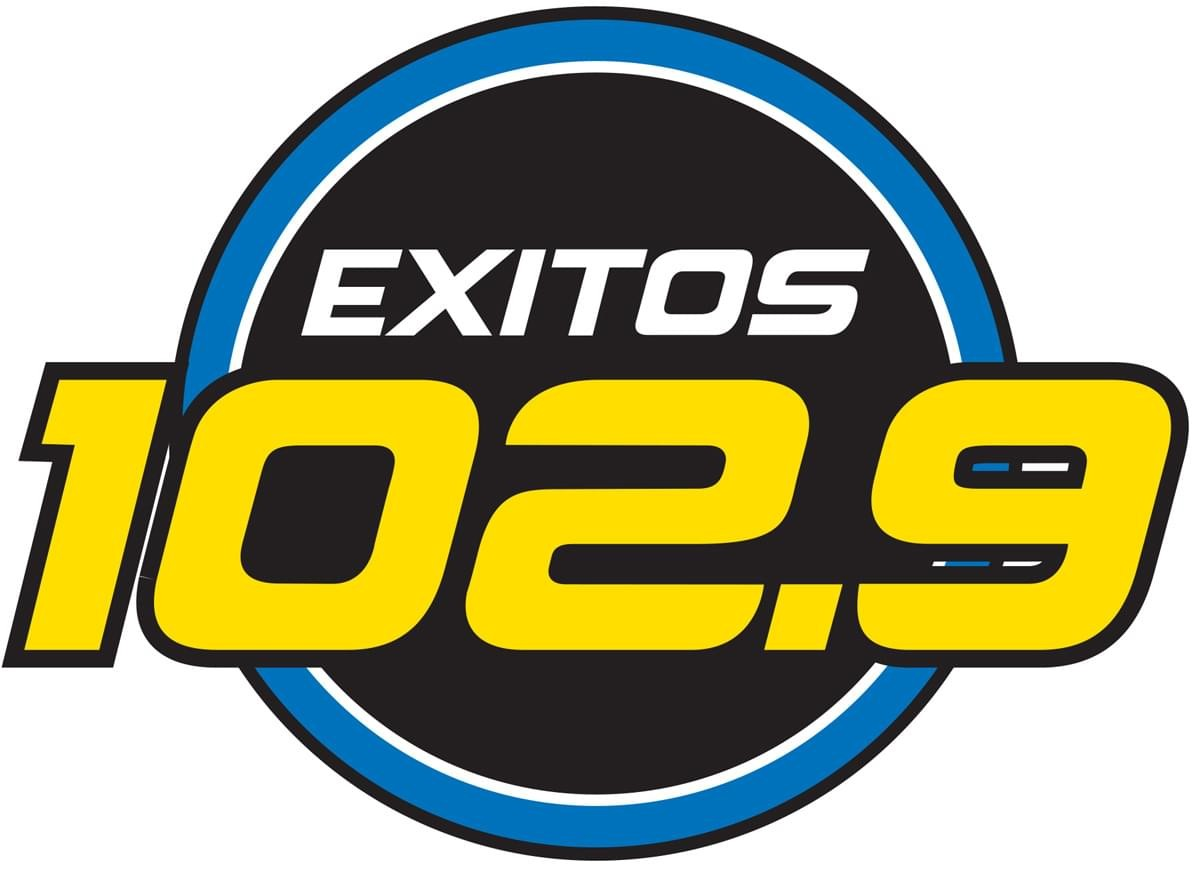
