= Aruban Americans =

Americans of Aruban birth or descent

Aruban Americans Mericanonan Arubiano
Total population
- 10,000 (2020)

Regions with significant populations
- New York, Massachusetts, Pennsylvania, New Jersey, Illinois, Wisconsin, Delaware, Maryland, Georgia, Florida, Kentucky, Missouri, Minnesota, Iowa, South Dakota, Arkansas, Oklahoma, Texas, Washington, Colorado and California

Languages
- Dutch, Papiamento, English, Spanish

Religion
- Christianity (Roman Catholic)

Aruban Americans (Papiamento: Mericanonan Arubiano) are Americans of Aruban descent or origin. Aruba is a constituent country of the Kingdom of the Netherlands. As of 2020, there are around 10,000 people of Aruban descent in the United States. The largest communities of Aruban Americans can be found in the states of Florida, New York and Texas.

Aruban migration to the United States mainly began in the 20th century and was later aided by the close economic relationship between Aruba and the United States in Aruba's tourism sector since the 1970s.

== Notable people ==
- Maureen Bunyan (journalist)
- Hildward Croes (musician)
- Andrew Holleran (writer)
- David R. Williams (scientist)
- Niesha Butler (basketball player)
- Jim Jones
- Jim Vanderzwaan (meteorologist)

== See also ==
• Demographics of Aruba

• Dutch West Indian Americans

• Arubans in the Netherlands

• West Indian Americans
