= KWWV =

Coordinates: 35.361°N 120.657°W

- Santa Margarita, California; United States
- Broadcast area: San Luis Obispo, California
- Frequency: 106.1 MHz (HD Radio)
- Branding: WiLD 106

Programming
- Format: Top 40 (CHR)
- Subchannels: HD2: K-News 98.5 (conservative talk); HD3: Simulcast of KYNS (classic country)

Ownership
- Owner: Martha Fahnoe; (Dimes Media Corporation)
- Sister stations: KPYG; KXDZ; KXTZ; KYNS

History
- First air date: July 29, 1986 (as KWSP)
- Former call signs: KWSP (1986–1997); KWEZ (1997–1999); KKAL (4/1999-11/1999)
- Call sign meaning: "K-Wave" (former smooth jazz format)

Technical information
- Licensing authority: FCC
- Facility ID: 25960
- Class: B1
- ERP: 1,100 watts
- HAAT: 441 meters (1,447 ft)
- Translators: HD2: 98.5 K253BR (San Luis Obispo); HD3: 97.7 K249FL (Templeton)

Links
- Public license information: Public file; LMS
- Webcast: Listen live; HD2: Listen live
- Website: www.wild1061.com; HD2: www.knews985.com

KWWV (106.1 FM, "Wild 106.1") is a commercial radio station that is licensed to San Luis Obispo, California. The station is owned by Dimes Media Corporation and broadcasts a Top 40 (CHR) radio format. Programming includes The Wild Wake Up with Doughboy weekday mornings, DJ Flashback weekday afternoons and XYZ with Erik Zachary weeknights, American Top 40 with Ryan Seacrest weekends.

== History ==
The station first signed on July 29, 1986, as KWSP, originally on the 106.3 FM frequency but later switching to 106.1. In August 1996, Hance Communications Ltd. sold KWSP to Gary and Virginia Brill for $500,000.

The KWWV call letters originally were used on the 99.7 FM frequency, which carried a smooth jazz format called "K-Wave". In 1997, smooth jazz was dropped in favor of rhythmic contemporary hit radio (CHR) as "Kiss 99.7". In the fall of 1999, station owner American General Media moved the format and the KWWV call sign to 106.1 FM to provide better signal coverage throughout San Luis Obispo County. Eventually, the station was forced to drop the "Kiss" moniker after Clear Channel Communications (now iHeartMedia) filed suit claiming ownership of the name "Kiss". Following a period of American General Media ownership, the station was purchased by Clear Channel.

Following the demise of Clear Channel-owned mainstream top 40 outlet KSLY ("SLY 96"), "Wild 106.1" adjusted its rhythmic CHR format to a more mainstream Top 40 presentation, reclaiming the number-one spot in the Arbitron ratings among females ages 18–34.

== HD radio ==
KWWV broadcasts in HD Radio. KWWV-HD1 simulcasts the analog signal at 106.1 FM. KWWV-HD2 carries a news/talk format branded as "K-News 98.5". KWWV-HD3 is a simulcast of KYNS, an AM station broadcasting classic country as "The Grade".

On June 1, 2020, KWWV-HD2 changed its format from soft adult contemporary to conservative talk, branded as "K-News 98.5".

In 2024, Dimes Media purchased former KRQZ translator K299BE (107.7 FM) to serve as a relay of KWWV-HD3.
