= KSTT =

KSTT may refer to:

- KSTT-FM, a radio station (104.5 FM) licensed to serve Atascadero, California, United States
- KERW, a radio station (101.3 FM) licensed to serve Los Osos-Baywood Park, California, which held the call sign KSTT-FM from 1990 to 2016
- KBOB (Iowa), a radio station (1170 AM) licensed to serve Davenport, Iowa, United States, which used the call sign KSTT from 1946 to 1984, and from 1986 to 1993.
