= KZOZ =

- San Luis Obispo, California; United States
- Frequency: 93.3 MHz
- Branding: 93.3 KZOZ

Programming
- Format: Classic Rock
- Affiliations: Compass Media Networks; United Stations Radio Networks

Ownership
- Owner: American General Media; (AGM California, Inc.)
- Sister stations: KKAL; KKJG; KSTT-FM; KVEC

History
- First air date: 1962
- Former call signs: KVEC-FM (1961–1965); KSBY-FM (1965–1975)

Technical information
- Licensing authority: FCC
- Facility ID: 36025
- Class: B
- ERP: 23,000 watts
- HAAT: 472 meters (1,549 ft)
- Transmitter coordinates: 35°21′40″N 120°39′25″W

Links
- Public license information: Public file; LMS
- Website: www.kzoz.com

KZOZ (93.3 FM) is a commercial radio station licensed to San Luis Obispo, California. The station is owned by American General Media and broadcasts a classic rock format.

== History ==
The station's first license was granted in 1962 to John C. Cohan with the call letters KVEC-FM. In November 1965, Cohan sold KVEC-FM and its AM counterpart to West Coast Broadcasters Inc., owner of TV station KSBY (channel 6) in San Luis Obispo, for $360,000. The new owner then changed the FM station's call sign to KSBY-FM.

In June 1975, KSBY-FM changed its call sign to KZOZ. At the time, the station was branded as "KZOZ Stereo 93" and aired an album-oriented rock format.

The 1980s brought several major changes at the station. On June 17, 1980, KZOZ adjusted its call sign to KZOZ-FM and flipped to top 40 with the branding "Z93". The station reverted to the KZOZ call letters on November 10, 1986. In December 1987, Phoenix Broadcasting Company sold KZOZ and then-sister station KKAL to Tattersall-Commonwealth Broadcasters Company for $3,615,000. The combo changed hands again in February 1989, when Tattersall-Commonwealth sold the pair to Anthony Brandon and L. Rogers Brandon for $2 million. The Brandons' radio company would later be known as American General Media.

On October 14, 1991, KZOZ switched formats from top 40 to classic rock, dropping its longtime "Z93" branding.

In 2003, KZOZ hired David Atwood as programming director. Atwood adjusted the station's music library in an active rock direction, adding newer songs alongside the existing classic rock as a response to the rise of modern rock rival KURQ. KZOZ removed all new songs and shifted back to classic rock in 2006. In the Arbitron fall 2004 radio ratings survey, KZOZ finished in first place in the San Luis Obispo market in the 12+ demographic.

As of July 2018, programming on KZOZ includes Jeff & Jeremy, a local morning show that has aired since February 2006, and Off The Record with Joe Benson, a nationally syndicated one-hour classic rock show.
