= Dutch Americans =

Americans of Dutch birth or descent

Nederlandse Amerikanen (Dutch)

Total population
- 3,083,041 (0.93%) in combination 884,857 (0.27%) Dutch alone 2021 estimates, self-reported

Regions with significant populations
- California; Mountain states, especially in Montana, Wyoming, and Colorado; Northeast, especially in Pennsylvania, New York, and New Jersey; Midwest, especially in Iowa, Michigan, Indiana, Ohio, and Wisconsin

Languages
- American English, Dutch (0.0486% of the total US population) (incl. Jersey Dutch), Dunglish; 2009-2013 estimates, self-reported

Religion
- 74% Protestant, 10% Roman Catholic, 15% other

Related ethnic groups
- Other Dutch people, New Netherlanders, Afrikaners, Frisian Americans, Pennsylvania Dutch, Belgian Americans, Dutch West Indian Americans, Surinamese Americans

Dutch Americans (Dutch: Nederlandse Amerikanen, pronounced [ˈneːdərˌlɑntsə ˌaːmeːriˈkaːnə(n)]) are Americans of Dutch and Flemish descent whose ancestors came from the Low Countries in the distant past, or from the Netherlands as from 1830 when the Flemish became independent from the United Kingdom of the Netherlands by creating the Kingdom of Belgium. Dutch settlement in the Americas started in 1613 with New Amsterdam, which was exchanged with the English for Suriname at the Treaty of Breda (1667) and renamed New York City. The English split the Dutch colony of New Netherland into two pieces and named them New York and New Jersey. Further waves of immigration occurred in the 19th and 20th centuries.

According to the 2021 American Community Survey, an estimated 3.1 million Americans claim total or partial Dutch heritage, while 884,857 Americans claimed total Dutch heritage. In 2021, 113,634 Dutch Americans were foreign-born (of which 61.5% in Europe). The 2009-2013 survey estimated 141,580 people of 5 years and over to speak Dutch at home, which was equal to 0.0486% of the total population of the United States. In 2021, 95.3% of the total Dutch American population of 5 years and over only spoke English at home.

Prominent (partial) Dutch American political figures include Presidents Martin Van Buren, Warren G. Harding, and Theodore and Franklin D. Roosevelt and U.S. Senators Philip Schuyler, Nicholas Van Dyke, Hamilton Fish, John C. Ten Eyck, Daniel W. Voorhees, Arthur Vandenberg, Peter G. Van Winkle, Alan Simpson, Fred Thompson, John Hoeven, and Christopher Van Hollen. Two of the Founding Fathers of the United States, Egbert Benson and John Jay, were also of Dutch descent. Governors John Hickenlooper of Colorado, Harold G. Hoffman and Thomas Kean of New Jersey, William Henry Vanderbilt III of Rhode Island, George Bell Timmerman Jr. of South Carolina, and Cornelius P. Van Ness of Vermont were also born to Dutch American families. Today the majority of the Dutch Americans live in Michigan, California, Montana, Minnesota, Illinois, Wyoming, Colorado, North Dakota, South Dakota, Nebraska, Kansas, Missouri, Indiana, New York, New Jersey, Wisconsin, Idaho, Utah, Iowa, Ohio, West Virginia, and Pennsylvania.

Not included among Dutch Americans are the Pennsylvania Dutch, a group of mainly German Americans who settled in Pennsylvania in the colonial era and whose name is a derivation of the Pennsylvania Dutch endonym Deitsch, which means "Pennsylvania Dutch" or "German". Ultimately, the terms Deitsch, Dutch, Diets and Deutsch are all descendants of the Proto-Germanic word *þiudiskaz, meaning "popular" or "of the people"; while all Germanic cognates of the term refer to some Germanic people, they more commonly refer to Germans than Netherlanders.

== Dutch presence in the present-day territory of the United States ==
=== Early exploration ===
In 1602, the Dutch government chartered the Dutch East India Company (Vereenigde Oostindische Compagnie, VOC). It sent explorers under the command of Henry Hudson, who arrived in 1609 and mapped what is now known as the Hudson River. Their initial goal was to find an alternative route to Asia, but they found good farmland and plenty of wildlife instead.

=== Oldest Dutch settlement ===
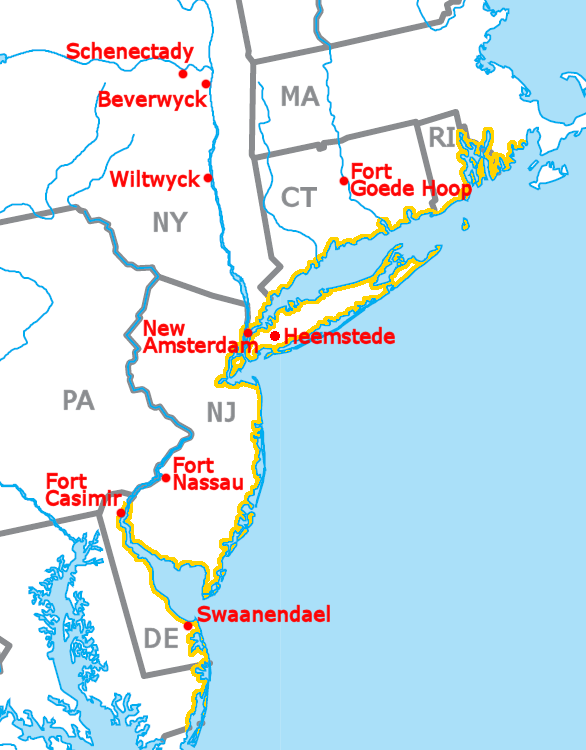
Principal Dutch colonies in North America

Flag of the Dutch Colony of New Netherland (now encompassing parts of what are now New York, New Jersey, and Delaware.)

The earliest Dutch settlement was built around 1613; it consisted of a number of small huts built by the crew of the Tijger (Tiger), a Dutch ship under the command of Captain Adriaen Block which had caught fire while sailing on the Hudson in the winter of 1613. The ship was lost and Block and his crew established a camp ashore. In the spring, Block and his men did some explorations along the coast of Long Island. Block Island still bears his name. Finally, they were sighted and rescued by another Dutch ship and the settlement was abandoned.

=== 17th century migration ===
Dutch trade in the New York area led to the establishment of trade posts as early as 1613. Permanent settlers arrived in 1617 at what is now Albany, New York. New Amsterdam was settled in 1625. In 1629, Dutch officials tried to expand the northern colony through a plan that promised "Liberties and Exemptions" to anyone who would ship fifty colonists to America at his own expense. Anyone who did so would be allowed to buy a stretch of land along the Hudson River from the Dutch West India Company of about twelve miles, extending as far inland as the owner wanted. The landowners were called patroons and had complete jurisdiction over their domains as well as extensive trading privileges. They also received these rights in perpetuity. That was a form of feudalism, which had vanished in the Dutch Republic but was introduced in North America. The Patroonships were not a success; by 1635, the Dutch West India Company had bought back four of the five patroonships originally registered in Amsterdam.

The Native Americans were no longer consulted or offered/asked to sell their lands. The Dutch were confronted with a new phenomenon, Native American raids, since the local tribes had now realized that the Dutch were not simply visitors but people set to settle their land.

The Dutch realized that they had gone with the wrong approach as they offered great privileges to wealthy, not poor, citizens. It was not until 1656 that the Dutch state abandoned its passivity and decided to actively support New Netherland. The Dutch state issued a proclamation, which stated that "all mechanics and farmers who can prove their ability to earn a living here shall receive free passage for themselves, their wives and children".

Although the Dutch were in control, only about half the settlers were ethnically Dutch (the other half consisted mainly of Walloons, Germans, and French Huguenots as well as New England Yankees). Manhattan grew increasingly multicultural. In 1664, the English seized the colony and renamed it New York. The Dutch briefly recaptured the colony in 1673, but during peace talks with the English, they decided to trade it in 1674 for Suriname in South America, which was more profitable.

=== 18th century ===
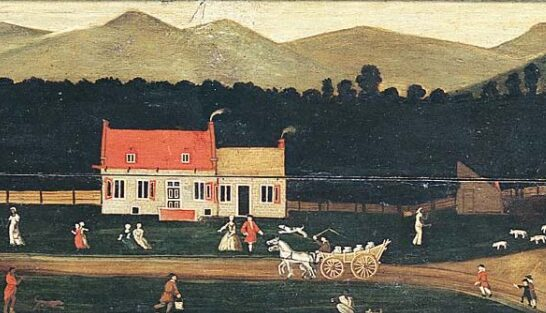
The Van Bergen farm, 1733, near Albany, New York—distinctively Dutch

In the hundred years of British rule that followed the change of ownership of New Netherland, Dutch immigration to America came to an almost complete standstill.

While the Netherlands was a small country, the Dutch Empire was quite large so emigrants leaving the mother country had a wide variety of choices. New Amsterdam was not high on their list, especially because of the Native American risk. The major Dutch cities were centers of high culture, but they still sent immigrants. Most new arrivals were farmers from remote villages who, on arrival, in America scattered into widely separated villages with little contact with one another. Even inside a settlement, different Dutch groups had minimal interaction. With very few new arrivals, the result was an increasingly traditional system cut off from the forces for change. The people maintained their popular culture, revolving around their language and their Calvinist religion. The Dutch brought along their own folklore, most famously Sinterklaas (the foundation of the modern-day Santa Claus), and created their own as in The Legend of Sleepy Hollow. They maintained their distinctive clothing, and food preferences and introduced some new foods to America, including beets, endive, spinach, parsley, and cookies.

After the British takeover, the rich Dutch families in Albany and New York City emulated the English elite and purchased English furniture, silverware, crystal, and jewelry. They were proud of their language, which was strongly reinforced by the church, but they were much slower than the Yankees in setting up schools for their children. They finally set up Queens College (now Rutgers University) in New Jersey, but it quickly became anglicized. They never attempted to start newspapers; they published no books and only a handful of religious tracts annually. Pietist leader Theodorus Jacobus Frelinghuysen (1691–1747) launched a series of revivals that challenge the mainstream church's emphasis on sacraments. Church buildings increasingly followed English rather than historic Dutch models. Politically, however, there was a strong anti-British sentiment that led most of the Dutch to support the American Revolution. One famous Dutch folk hero was Rip Van Winkle, characterized by being absurdly old-fashioned and out of date, which aimed to instill the establishment of an American culture distinct from British culture. Most farmers focused on providing subsistence for their families; about a third were chiefly oriented to market prices.

Dutch Quakers came to the Philadelphia area in response to the appeal of William Penn. Penn, himself a Dutch Briton (his mother being from Rotterdam), had paid three visits to the Netherlands, where he published several pamphlets.

Many Dutch settlers enslaved African Americans and owned black slaves in the area called Dutch New Netherland.

==== Colonial Dutch American population in 1790 ====
The Census Bureau produced estimates of the colonial American population with roots in the Netherlands, in collaboration with the American Council of Learned Societies, by scholarly classification of the names of all White heads of families recorded in the first U.S. census of 1790. The government required accurate estimates of the origins of the colonial stock population as basis for computing National Origins Formula immigration quotas in the 1920s; for this task scholars estimated the proportion of names in each state determined to be of Dutch derivation. The final report estimated about 3.1% of the U.S. population in 1790 was of Dutch origin, heavily concentrated in the Middle Colonies of historic New Netherland which became the British American Colonial Province of New York, Province of New Jersey, Province of Pennsylvania, and Delaware Colony—ultimately forming the U.S. states of New York, New Jersey, Pennsylvania, and Delaware.

(Dutch Republic) Estimated Dutch American population in the Continental United States as of the 1790 Census

State or Territory	(Dutch Republic) Dutch	
State or Territory	#	%
Connecticut	600	0.26%
Delaware	2,000	4.32%
Georgia	100	0.19%
Kentucky & (Tennessee) Tenn.	1,200	1.29%
Maine	100	0.10%
Maryland	1,000	0.48%
Massachusetts	600	0.16%
New Hampshire	100	0.07%
New Jersey	28,250	16.62%
New York	55,000	17.50%
North Carolina	800	0.28%
Pennsylvania	7,500	1.77%
Rhode Island	250	0.39%
South Carolina	500	0.36%
Vermont	500	0.59%
Virginia	1,500	0.34%
(Thirteen Colonies) 1790 Census Area	100,000	3.10%
(Ohio) Northwest Territory	−	-
(New France) French America	−	-
(Spanish Empire) Spanish America	−	-
United States	100,000	3.10%

=== 19th century ===
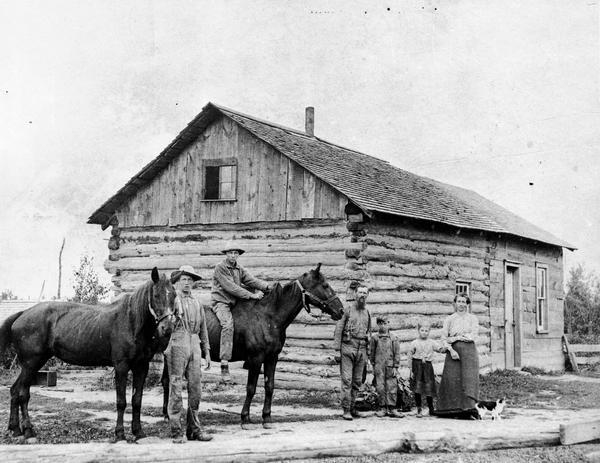
Typical Dutch homestead in Northeast Wisconsin, circa 1855

During the early nineteenth century, large numbers of Dutch farmers, forced by high taxes and low wages, started immigrating to America. They mainly settled down in the Midwest, especially Michigan, Illinois and Iowa. In the 1840s, Calvinist immigrants desiring more religious freedom immigrated. West Michigan in particular has become associated with Dutch American culture, and the highly conservative influence of the Dutch Reformed Church, centering on the cities of Holland and (to a lesser extent) Grand Rapids.

Waves of Catholic emigrants, initially encouraged in the 1840s by Father Theodore J. van den Broek, emigrated from the southern Netherlands to form communities in Wisconsin, primarily to Little Chute, Hollandtown, and the outlying farming communities. Whole families and even neighborhoods left for America. Most of these early emigrants were from villages near Uden, including Zeeland, Boekel, Mill, Oploo and Gemert. By contrast, many Protestant agrarian emigrants to Michigan and Iowa were drawn from Groningen, Friesland, and Zeeland; areas known for their clay soils.

The Dutch economy of the 1840s was stagnant and much of the motivation to emigrate was economic rather than political or religious. The emigrants were not poor, as the cost of passage, expenses, and land purchase in America would have been substantial. They were not, however, affluent and many would have been risking most of their wealth on the chance of economic improvement. There were also political pressures at the time that favored mass emigrations of Protestants.

=== 20th century migration ===
A significant number of Dutchmen emigrated to the United States after World War II arrived from Indonesia via the Netherlands. After Indonesia, formerly known as the Dutch East Indies, gained independence its Indo-European (Eurasian) population known as Indies Dutchmen (Dutch: Indische Nederlanders) repatriated to the Netherlands. Around 60,000 continued their diaspora to the United States. This particular group is also known as Dutch-Indonesians, Indonesian-Dutch, or Amerindos.

"Nine tenths of the so called Europeans (in the Dutch East Indies) are the offspring of whites married to native women. These mixed people are called Indo-Europeans... They have formed the backbone of officialdom. In general they feel the same loyalty to Holland as do the white Netherlanders. They have full rights as Dutch citizens and they are Christians and follow Dutch customs. This group has suffered more than any other during the Japanese occupation." Official U.S. Army publication for the benefit of G.I.'s, 1944.

These Dutch Indos mainly entered the United States under legislative refugee measures and were sponsored by Christian organizations such as the Church World Service and the Catholic Relief Services. An accurate count of Indo immigrants is not available, as the U.S. census classified people according to their self-determined ethnic affiliation. The Indos could have therefore been included in overlapping categories of "country of origin", "other Asians," "total foreign", "mixed parentage", "total foreign-born" and "foreign mother tongue". However the Indos that settled in the United States via the legislative refugee measures number at least 25,000 people.

The original post-war refugee legislation of 1948, already adhering to a strict "affidavit of support" policy, was still maintaining a color bar making it difficult for Indos to emigrate to the United States. By 1951 American consulates in the Netherlands registered 33,500 requests and had waiting times of 3 to 5 years. Also the Walter-McCarren Act of 1953 adhered to the traditional American policy of minimizing immigrants from Asia. The yearly quota for Indonesia was limited to a 100 visas, even though Dutch foreign affairs attempted to profile Indos as refugees from the alleged pro-communist Sukarno administration.

The 1953 flood disaster in the Netherlands resulted in the Refugee Relief Act including a slot for 15,000 ethnic Dutch that had at least 50% European blood (one year later loosened to Dutch citizens with at least two Dutch grandparents) and an immaculate legal and political track record. In 1954 only 187 visas were actually granted. Partly influenced by the anti-Western rhetoric and policies of the Sukarno administration the anti-communist senator Francis E. Walter pleaded for a second term of the Refugee Relief Act in 1957 and an additional slot of 15,000 visas in 1958.

In 1958, the Pastore–Walter Immigration Act for the relief of certain distressed aliens was passed allowing for a one-off acceptance of 10,000 Dutchmen from Indonesia (excluding the regular annual quota of 3,136 visas). It was hoped however that only 10% of these Dutch refugees would in fact be racially mixed Indos and the American embassy in The Hague was frustrated with the fact that Canada, where ethnic profiling was even stricter, was getting the full-blooded Dutch and the United States was getting Dutch "all rather heavily dark". Still in 1960 senators Pastore and Walter managed to get a second two-year term for their act which was used by a great number of Dutch Indos.

There is a Dutch-speaking African American community because the Dutch owned black slaves.

== Dutch influence on the United States ==
- According to tradition, in 1626 Peter Minuit obtained the island of Manhattan from the Native Americans in exchange for goods with a total value of 60 guilders ($24); most aspects of the story have been called into question by experts. Minuit, a Walloon, was employed by the Dutch West India Company to manage its colony of New Amsterdam, the future New York. The names of some other settlements that were established still exist today as boroughs and neighborhoods of New York: Brooklyn (Breukelen), Wall Street (Wal Straat), Stuyvesant, Staten Island (named after the Dutch parliament, the Staten Generaal), Harlem (Haarlem), Coney Island (Konijnen Eiland, means "Rabbit Island") and Flushing (Vlissingen).
- In 1657, the clash between Peter Stuyvesant and Quakers led by John Bowne resulted in the Flushing Remonstrance which served as the basis for religious freedom in America.
- Dutch settlers and their descendants in the colonies played active roles in the American Revolution and the formation of the United States, most especially descendants of the Schuyler family and the Van Cortlandt family. Dutch American signers of the Declaration of Independence included Philip Livingston and Lewis Morris, both from New York. Generals for the patriots included Philip Schuyler, Peter Gansevoort, and Major General James Morgan Jr. from New Jersey. On the side working with the British included New York City Mayor David Mathews (a cousin of General Schuyler), Major General Oliver Delancey and Brigadier General Cortlandt Skinner (both Schuyler family descendants).
- During the American war of Independence the Dutch were active allies of the American revolutionaries. From the island of Sint Eustatius they gave the Thirteen Colonies one of the few opportunities to acquire arms. In 1778, British Lord Stormont claimed in parliament that "if Sint Eustatius had sunk into the sea three years before, the United Kingdom would already have dealt with George Washington".
- The Dutch were the first to salute the flag and, therefore, the first to acknowledge the independence of the United States on November 16, 1776.
- The American Declaration of Independence is said to have in many ways been influenced by the Dutch "Plakkaat van Verlatinghe" (Act of Abjuration).

Several American Presidents had Dutch ancestry:

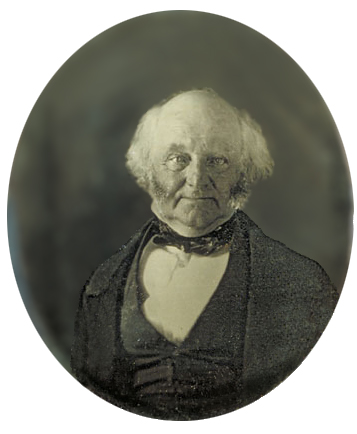
Martin Van Buren circa 1855. He was the first U.S. President without any British ancestry as he was of entire Dutch descent.

- Martin Van Buren, 8th President. He was a key organizer of the Democratic Party and the first president who was not of English, Irish, Scottish, or Welsh descent. He is also the only president not to have spoken English as his first language, but rather grew up speaking Dutch.
- Theodore Roosevelt, 26th President. Roosevelt is most famous for his personality, his energy, his vast range of interests and achievements, his model of masculinity, and his "cowboy" persona. In 1901, he became president after the assassination of President William McKinley. Roosevelt was a Progressive reformer who sought to move the Republican Party into the Progressive camp.
- Warren G. Harding, 29th President. His mother's ancestors were Dutch, including the well known Van Kirk family.
- Franklin D. Roosevelt, 32nd President. Elected to four terms in office, he served from 1933 to 1945, and is the only U.S. president to have served more than two terms. A central figure of the twentieth century, he has consistently been ranked as one of the three greatest U.S. presidents in scholarly surveys.
- George H. W. Bush and George W. Bush, 41st and 43rd Presidents, respectively. They count members of the Schuyler family and the related Beekman family among their ancestors.

== Dutch language and Dutch names in North America ==
Foreign-born Dutch speakers in the United States
Year	Population
1910	126,045
1920	136,540
1930	133,142
1940	102,700
1960	130,482
1970	127,834

The first Dutch settlers lived in small isolated communities, and as a consequence were barely exposed to English. As the Dutch lost their own colonies in North America to the British, the Dutch settlers increasingly were exposed to other immigrants and their languages and the Dutch language gradually started to disappear. The 2009-2013 American Community Survey estimated 141,580 people of 5 years and over to speak Dutch at home, which was equal to 0.0486% of the population in the United States. In 2021, 95.3% of the total Dutch American population of 5 years and over only spoke English at home.

In 1764, Archibald Laidlie preached the first English sermon to the Dutch Reformed congregation in New York City. Ten years later English was introduced in the schools. In Kingston, Dutch was used in church as late as 1808. A few years before, a traveler had reported that on Long Island and along the North River in Albany, Dutch was still the lingua franca of the elderly.

Francis Adrian van der Kemp, who came to the United States as a refugee in 1788, wrote that his wife was able to converse in Dutch with the wives of Alexander Hamilton and General George Clinton. In 1847, immigrants from the Netherlands were welcomed in Dutch by the Reverend Isaac Wyckoff upon their arrival in New York. Wyckoff himself was a descendant of one of the first settlers in Rensselaerswyck, who had learned to speak English at school.

Despite its common name, the Pennsylvania Dutch language spoken in some US communities is more closely related to the Palatine German dialects than it is to Dutch.

=== Names of Dutch origin ===
In the first half of the twentieth century, the Dutch language was hardly spoken in North America, with the exception of first generation Dutch immigrants. The marks of the Dutch heritage — in language, in reference to historical Dutch people (for example Stuyvesant) and in reference to Dutch places — can still be seen. There are about 35 Dutch restaurants and bakeries in the United States, most of them founded in the 20th century.

Adaptation of Dutch names for places in the United States was common. New York City for example has many originally Dutch street and place names, which date back to the time it was the Dutch colony of New Netherland. Several landmarks like Conyne Eylandt (Modern Dutch: Konijn eiland, meaning Rabbit Island) became more suitable to Anglophones (Coney Island). Additionally, Brooklyn (Breukelen), Harlem (Haarlem), Wall Street (walstraat) and Broadway (brede weg) are adapted after Dutch names or words. And up the river in New York State Piermont, Orangeburg, Blauvelt and Haverstraw, just to name a few places. In the Hudson Valley region there are many places and waterways whose names incorporate the word -kill, Dutch for "stream" or "riverbed", including the Catskill Mountains, Peekskill, and the Kill van Kull. Also, the American state of Rhode Island is a surviving example of Dutch influence in Colonial America. In 1614, was christened as Roodt Eylandt (Rood Eiland in modern Dutch), meaning "Red Island", referring to the red clay found on the island.

=== English words of Dutch origin ===
Dutch and English are both part of the West Germanic language group and share numerous cognates. Examples include the article "the" (de in Dutch), the words "book" (boek), "house" (huis), "pen" (pen), and, "street" (straat), among others.

There are also some words in American English that are of Dutch origin, like "cookie" (koekje) and "boss" (baas). And in some American family names a couple of Dutch characteristics still remain. Like (a) the prefix "van" (as in Martin Van Buren), (b) the prefix "de"(/"der"/"des"/"den") (as in Jared DeVries), (c) a combination of the two "van de ..." (as in Robert J. Van de Graaff), or (d) "ter"/"te"("ten") or "ver", which mean respectively (a) "of" (possessive or locative), (b) "the" (definite article), (c) "of the..." and (d) "at the" ("of the"/"in the") (locative).

=== Creole dialects ===
Contact between other languages also created various creoles with Dutch as the base language. Two examples, Jersey Dutch and Mohawk Dutch, are now extinct. This is possibly due to the ease of transition from Dutch to English, stemming from a shared linguistic genealogy.

=== Newspapers ===
Little Chute, Wisconsin, remained a Dutch-speaking community—known locally as "speaking Hollander"—into the twentieth century. As late as 1898, church sermons and event announcements were in Dutch. Dutch newspapers continued in the area—mainly in De Pere by Catholic clergymen—were published up until World War I. The only remaining publication that is written exclusively in Dutch is Maandblad de Krant, which is published monthly in Penticton, British Columbia, Canada, and mailed to subscribers throughout the United States from Oroville, Washington.

== Dutch-American Heritage Day ==
As of 1990, November 16 is "Dutch-American Heritage Day". On November 16, 1776, a small American warship, the Andrew Doria, sailed into the harbor of the Dutch island of Sint Eustatius in the West Indies. Only four months before, the United States had declared its independence from Great Britain. The American crew was delighted when the governor of the island ordered that his fort's cannons be fired in a friendly salute. The first ever given by a foreign power to the flag of the United States, it was a risky and courageous act. Indeed, angered by Dutch trading and contraband with the rebellious colonies, the British seized the island a few years later. The Dutch recaptured the island in 1784.

== Dutch-American Friendship Day ==
April 19 is Dutch-American Friendship Day, which remembers the day in 1782 when John Adams, later to become the second president of the United States, was received by the States General in The Hague and recognized as Minister Plenipotentiary of the United States of America. It was also the day that the house he had purchased at Fluwelen Burgwal 18 in The Hague was to become the first American Embassy in the world.

== Dutch Heritage Festivals ==
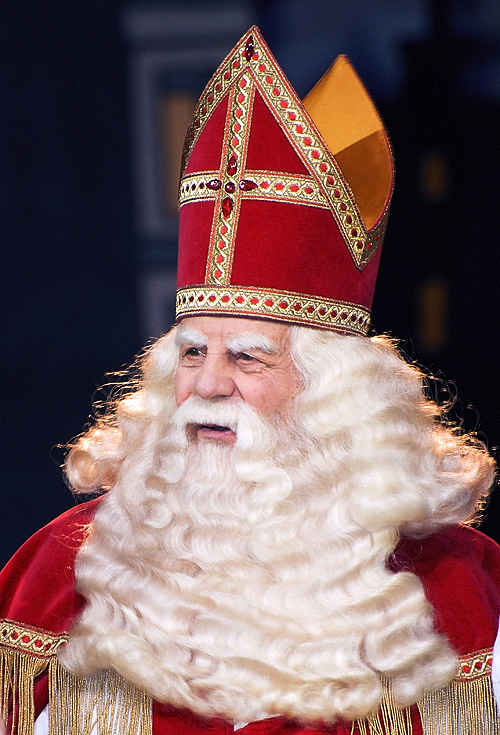
Sinterklaas

Many of the Dutch heritage festivals that take place around the United States coincide with the blooming of tulips in a particular region. The Tulip Time Festival in Holland, Michigan is the largest such festival with other notable gatherings such as the Pella Tulip Time in Pella, Iowa; Tulip Festival in Orange City, Iowa and Albany, New York; Dutch Days in Fulton, Illinois; Let's Go Dutch Days in Baldwin, Wisconsin; Holland Days in Lynden, Washington; Holland Happening in Oak Harbor, Washington; Holland Fest in Cedar Grove, Wisconsin, and the Wooden Shoe Tulip Fest in Woodburn, Oregon. Often Dutch heritage festivals coincide with the blooming of the tulip. See Tulip Festival for additional explanations of some of these festivals. A Dutch Festival is also held at Hofstra University in Hempstead, New York; and a Holland Festival in Long Beach, California. A traditional Dutch Kermis Festival is celebrated in October in Little Chute, WI. During late November and early December, a Dutch Winterfest is held in Holland, MI, to coincide with the traditional arrival of Sinterklaas; the cultural ancestor of the American Santa Claus." There is an annual Sinterklass festival held in Rhinebeck and Kingston, New York where Sinterklaas crosses the Hudson River and a parade is held in recognition of the Greater New York Area's Dutch cultural heritage.

Lately, many of the larger cities in the U.S. have a King's Day (Koningsdag) festival that is celebrated in the Netherlands on April 27 to celebrate the birthday of King Willem Alexander. The Portland Dutch Society started this annual Dutch Holiday celebration in Portland, OR in 2013 and will have one again in 2015 on April 26. It is celebrated by people of Dutch heritage dressed in their Orange clothes and enjoying the sounds of Dutch music and eating typical Dutch foods like kroketten, friet met mayonaise, zoute haring, and other Dutch delicacies.

== Dutch-Americans who are People of Color ==
Most Dutch-Americans are white, but some are people of color, including Black Dutch-Americans. During the 18th and 19th centuries, many enslaved and free Black people spoke Dutch. New York City and New Jersey had notable Dutch-speaking Black populations during the colonial era and into the 1800s, dating back to the Dutch settlement in New Amsterdam.

== Religion ==
The beginnings of the Reformed Church in America date to 1628. One of the earliest is The Brookville Reformed Church. In 1740, it had 65 congregations in New York and New Jersey, served by ministers trained in Europe. Schools were few but to obtain their own ministers they formed "Queens College" (now Rutgers University) in 1766. In 1771, there were 34 ministers for over 100 churches. Until 1764, in at least three Dutch churches in New York City, all sermons were in Dutch; Theodore Roosevelt reports his grandfather's church used Dutch as late as 1810. Other churches with roots in Dutch immigration to the United States include the Christian Reformed Church, the Protestant Reformed Churches, the United Reformed Churches, the Netherlands Reformed Congregations, the Heritage Netherlands Reformed Congregations and the Free Reformed Churches. Along with the Reformed churches, Roman Catholicism is the other major religion of Dutch Americans. Beginning in 1848, a significant number of Roman Catholics from the Dutch provinces of North Brabant, Limburg and southern Gelderland went to create many settlements in northeastern Wisconsin. But even today, Dutch Americans remain majority Protestant.

== Demographics ==
Population of Dutch ancestry by county (self-reported, 2021)

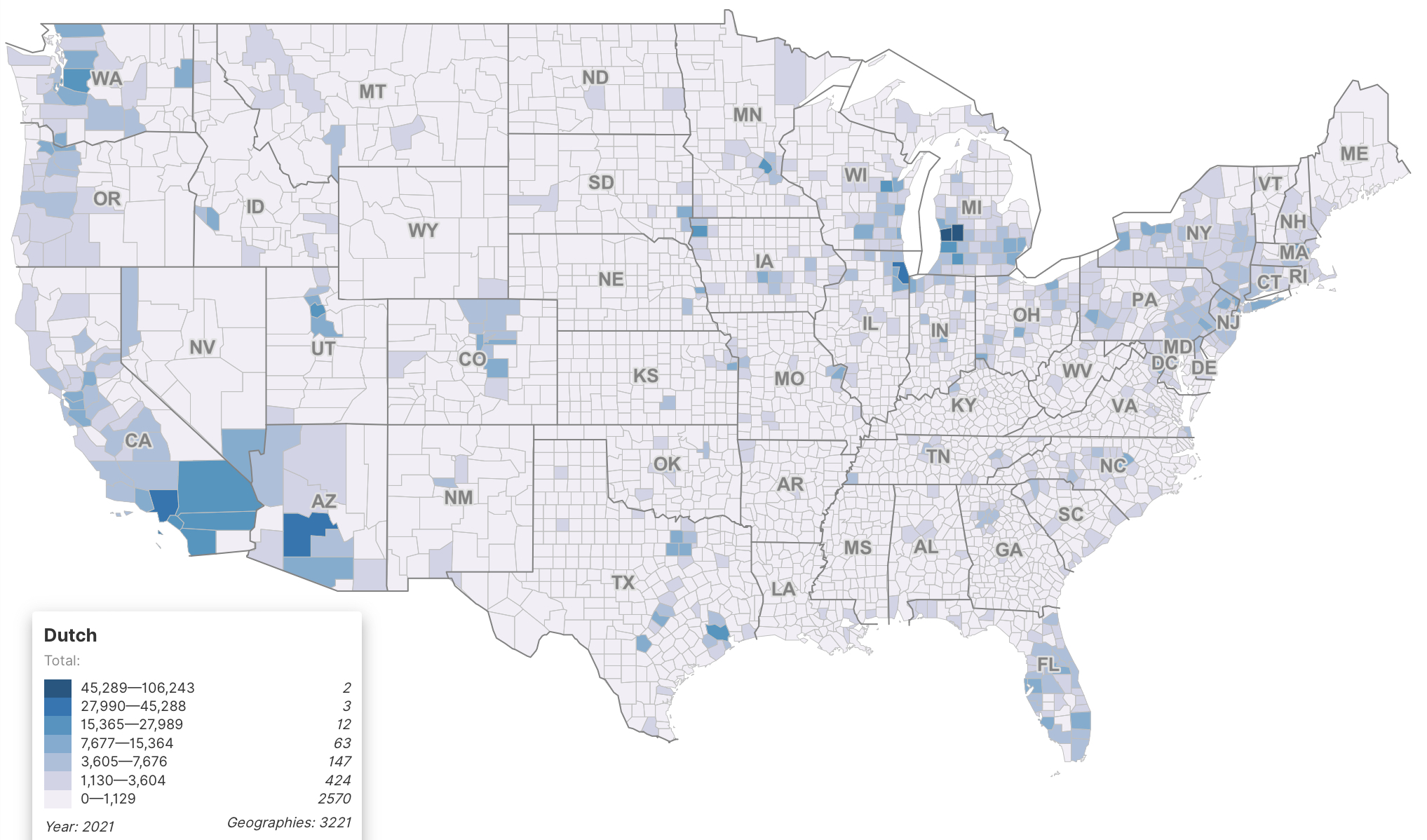
Partial and full

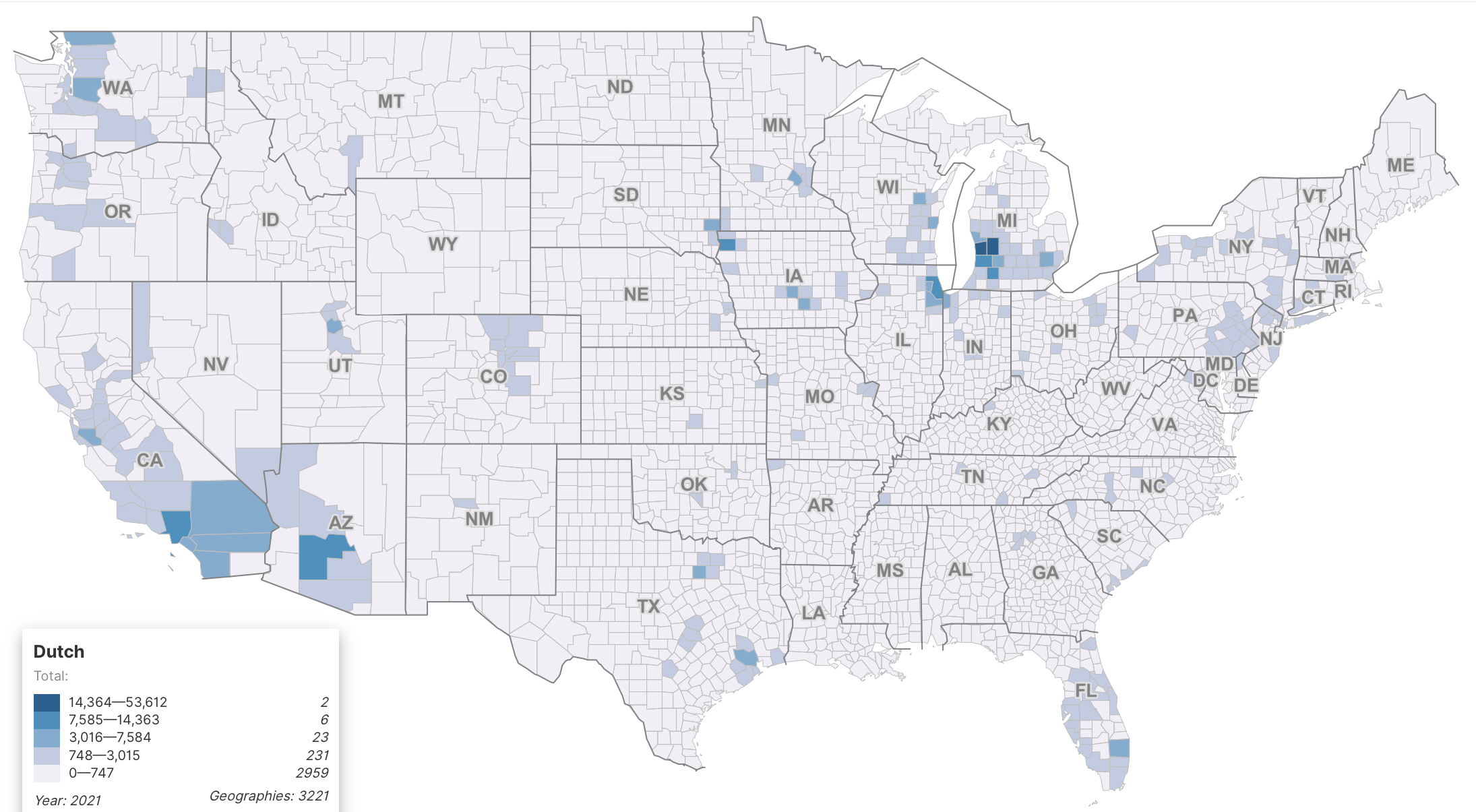
Full

Between 1820 and 1900, 340,000 Dutch emigrated from the Netherlands to the United States. In the aftermath of World War II, several tens of thousands of Dutch immigrants joined them, mainly moving to California and Washington. In several counties in Michigan and Iowa, Dutch Americans remain the largest ethnic group. In 2020, most self-reported Dutch Americans live in Michigan, followed by California and New York. While the highest concentration of Dutch Americans are found in South Dakota, Michigan, Iowa, and Wisconsin. According to 2021 US Census data, 3,083,041 Americans self-reported to be of (partial) Dutch ancestry, while 884,857 Americans claimed full Dutch heritage. 2,969,407 Dutch Americans were native born in 2021, while 113,634 Dutch Americans were foreign-born, of which 61.5% was born in Europe and 62,9% entered the United States before 2000.

=== 2000 population of Dutch ancestry ===
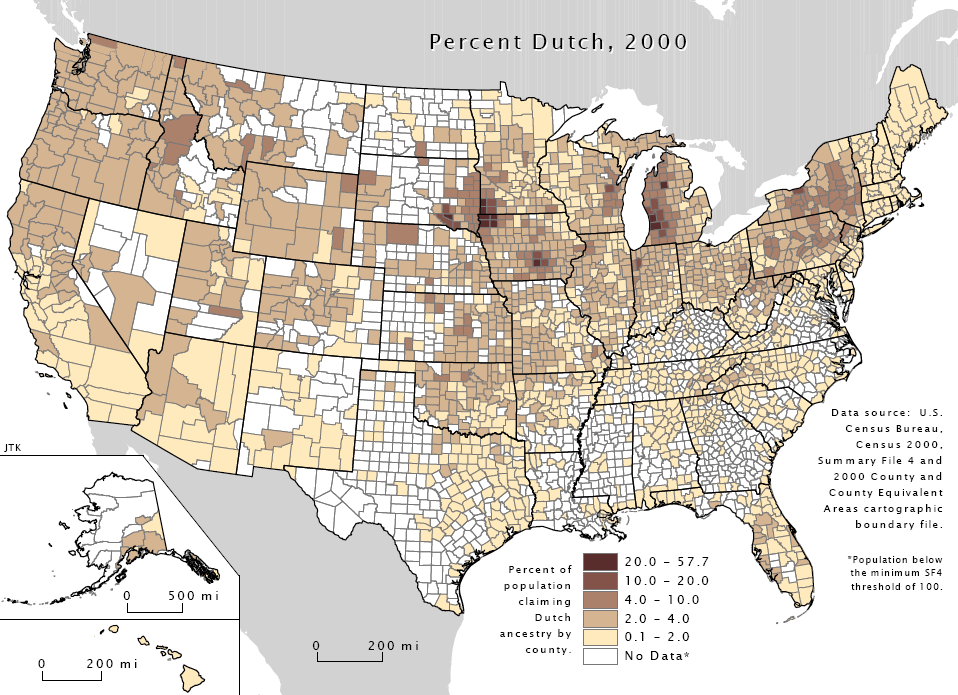
Percentage of (partial) Dutch ancestry by county (self-reported, 2000)

According to the 2000 US Census, more than 5 million Americans claimed total or partial Dutch heritage. They were particularly concentrated around Grand Rapids, Michigan; Rock Rapids, Iowa; Sioux City, Iowa; Des Moines, Iowa; Fulton, Illinois, Celeryville, Ohio, and Little Chute, Wisconsin. These areas are surrounded with towns and villages that were founded by Dutch settlers in the 19th century, such as Holland, Michigan and Zeeland, Michigan; Pella, Iowa, and Orange City, Iowa. Other Dutch enclaves include Lynden, Washington, Ripon, California, and places in New Jersey. It is estimated that, by 1927, as many as 40,000 Dutch settlers, primarily from North Brabant and Limburg, had immigrated to the United States, with the largest concentrations in the area near Little Chute, Wisconsin. By the early twentieth century, Little Chute was the largest Catholic Dutch community in the United States. In the Chicago suburbs, there are sizable Dutch communities in and around Elmhurst, Wheaton, Palos Heights, South Holland, Lansing, Dyer, and other surrounding communities, anchored by Reformed churches and Christian schools.

In California, the San Joaquin Delta had a major Dutch (incl. Frisian) and Belgian influence, as settlers from those countries arrived in the 1850s, after California obtained statehood. They drained away swamps and created artificial islands known as polders, constructed dikes to back away the Sacramento and San Joaquin Rivers flowing into the San Francisco Bay, also turned them into fertile farmlands and set up inland ports such as Stockton. Also their communities like Lathrop, Galt, Rio Vista and French Camp which were named for Belgians from Belgium are of both French (Walloon) or Flemish origin. There is a Dutch community in Redlands, Ontario, Ripon and Bellflower.

=== 2020 population of Dutch ancestry by state ===
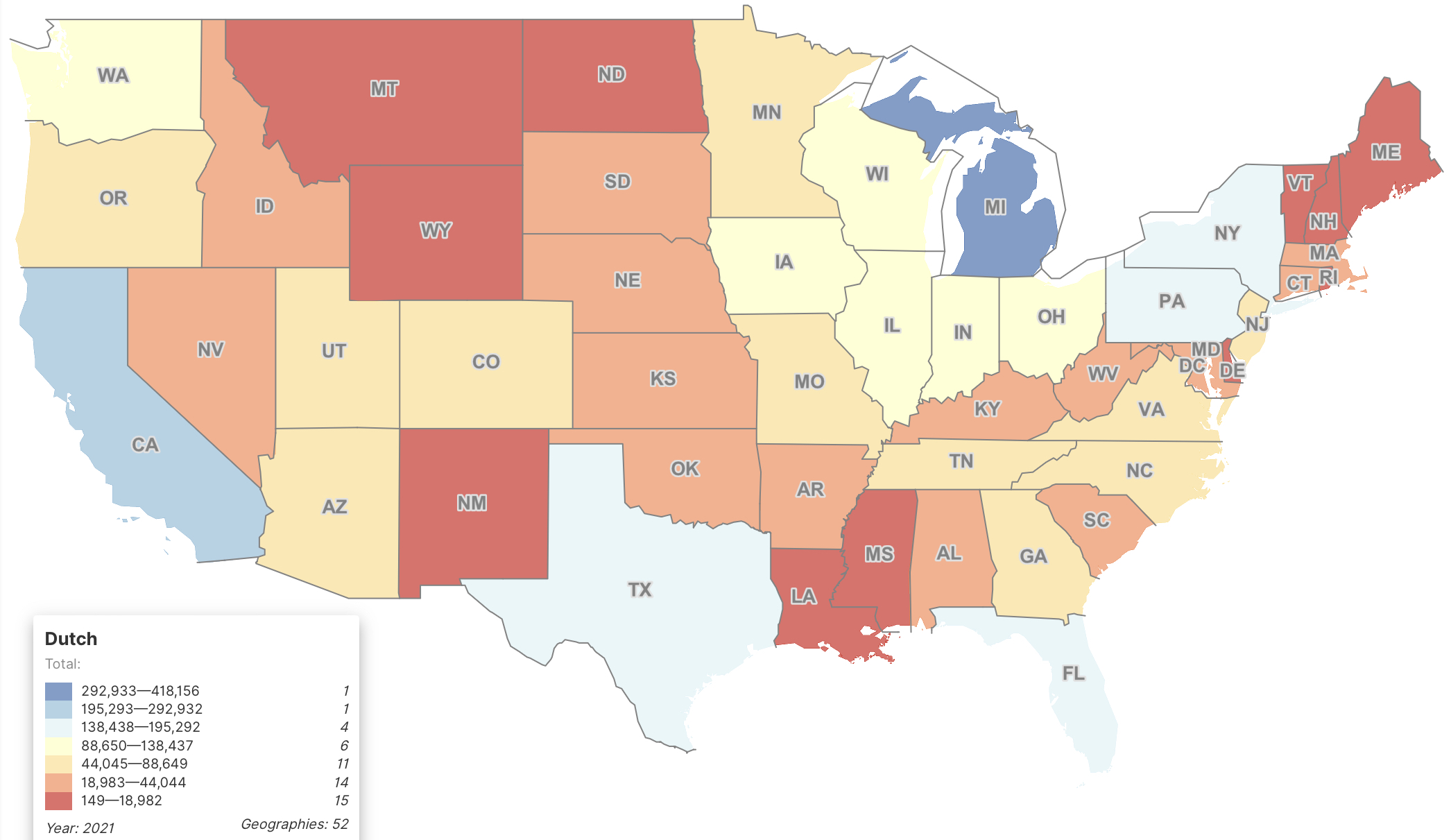
Population of (partial) Dutch ancestry by state (2021)

As of 2020, the distribution of self-reported Dutch Americans across the 50 states and DC is as presented in the following table:

(Netherlands) Estimated Dutch American self-reported population by state (United States)
State	Number	Percentage
Alabama	30,349	0.62%
Alaska	10,533	1.43%
Arizona	80,124	1.12%
Arkansas	31,550	1.05%
California	313,233	0.80%
Colorado	86,616	1.52%
Connecticut	24,644	0.69%
Delaware	7,895	0.82%
District of Columbia	4,886	0.70%
Florida	170,831	0.81%
Georgia	64,164	0.61%
Hawaii	6,567	0.46%
Idaho	31,398	1.79%
Illinois	145,771	1.15%
Indiana	109,108	1.63%
Iowa	116,971	3.71%
Kansas	43,715	1.50%
Kentucky	41,100	0.92%
Louisiana	17,506	0.38%
Maine	11,767	0.88%
Maryland	40,293	0.67%
Massachusetts	36,951	0.54%
Michigan	427,818	4.29%
Minnesota	91,012	1.63%
Mississippi	13,356	0.45%
Missouri	78,763	1.29%
Montana	19,606	1.85%
Nebraska	31,950	1.66%
Nevada	26,471	0.87%
New Hampshire	12,596	0.93%
New Jersey	79,492	0.89%
New Mexico	14,614	0.70%
New York	204,250	1.05%
North Carolina	83,803	0.81%
North Dakota	8,156	1.07%
Ohio	140,161	1.20%
Oklahoma	47,932	1.21%
Oregon	74,960	1.79%
Pennsylvania	161,506	1.26%
Rhode Island	4,459	0.42%
South Carolina	36,482	0.72%
South Dakota	37,913	4.31%
Tennessee	64,028	0.95%
Texas	178,457	0.62%
Utah	58,948	1.87%
Vermont	7,396	1.18%
Virginia	64,790	0.76%
Washington	131,299	1.75%
West Virginia	24,445	1.35%
Wisconsin	132,420	2.28%
Wyoming	9,834	1.69%
United States	3,692,889	1.13%

== Notable people ==
Harmen Jansen Knickerbocker was an early Dutch settler of New York's Hudson River Valley.

In art, Willem de Kooning was a leading Abstract Expressionist painter, often depicting the human form in violent brush strokes and daring color juxtapositions. Muralist Anthony Heinsbergen interior designs are still seen today in most of the world's movie theaters. Cowboy artist Earl W. Bascom, a sculptor known as the "cowboy of cowboy artists", is a descendant of the Van Riper family who was early settlers of New York.

In business, the Vanderbilt family was once among the richest families in the United States.

In education, Stephen Van Rensselaer III founded Rensselaer Polytechnic Institute in Troy, New York, in 1824, which is the oldest technological university in the English-speaking world and the Western Hemisphere. Famous accomplishments of alumni include the Ferris Wheel, Brooklyn Bridge, commercially viable television and radar, and the microprocessor.

In literature, Janwillem van de Wetering is renowned for his detective fiction; his most popular creation being that of Grijpstra and de Gier. Edward W. Bok was a Pulitzer Prize-winning autobiographer and magazine editor. He is also credited with coining the term "living room". Greta Van Susteren's father was a Dutch American. Prolific poet Leo Vroman escaped from the Nazi-occupied Netherlands to the Dutch East Indies to end up in a harsh concentration camp for Europeans run by the Japanese army when it overran the islands. After the war, he immigrated to the United States. His Dutch Indonesian friend, fellow camp survivor, and author Tjalie Robinson also lived in the United States, where he founded several cultural institutions. The author Erik Hazelhoff Roelfzema, writer of the book Soldier of Orange, was a Dutch resistance fighter, spy, and decorated war hero that immigrated to the United States after World War II. Born on Java in the Dutch East Indies, he died in his home in Hawaii.

In entertainment, actor, presenter and entertainer Dick Van Dyke is of Dutch descent, with a career spanning six decades. He is best known for his starring roles in Mary Poppins, Chitty Chitty Bang Bang, The Dick Van Dyke Show and Diagnosis: Murder. Dick Van Patten and his son Vincent are of Dutch descent; Dick was famous for the television show Eight is Enough. Three generations of Fondas from Fonda, New York have graced the stage and screen for almost a century, including Henry Fonda, son Peter Fonda, daughter Jane Fonda, granddaughter Bridget Fonda and grandson Troy Garity. The X-Men trilogy starred Dutch actress Famke Janssen and Dutch-descended Rebecca Romijn who is perhaps best known for her TV roles in such comedies as Ugly Betty. Anneliese van der Pol, a singer and actress, is a star of Disney's That's so Raven. Iconic star Audrey Hepburn was born in Belgium to a Dutch expatriate. Musicians Eddie and Alex van Halen were the lead guitarist and drummer, respectively, and co-founders of the band Van Halen, born to a Dutch father and Dutch-Indonesian mother. Bruce Springsteen's father was of Dutch and Irish heritage, from one of the original families that settled in New Netherland. The brothers Ronny, Johnny, and Donnie van Zant, the lead singer of Lynyrd Skynyrd and founder of 38 Special have Dutch ancestry. Singer Whitney Houston had Dutch ancestry. Don Van Vliet, the musician with the stage name Captain Beefheart, changed his middle name from Glen to the preposition to 1965 to honor his Dutch heritage. Actor Mark-Paul Gosselaar, known from the series Saved by the Bell, was born to a Dutch father and a Dutch-Indonesian mother. Matt Groening, the author of The Simpsons and Futurama has Dutch Mennonite ancestors, his family name originating from the Dutch city of Groningen. Chevy Chase also has deep Dutch roots from colonial New York.

In politics, Peter Stuyvesant was the last Director-General of the colony of New Netherland. Stuyvesant greatly expanded the settlement of New Amsterdam, today known as New York. Stuyvesant's administration built the protective wall on Wall Street, and the canal that became Broad Street, known today as Broadway. The prestigious Stuyvesant High School is named after him. Theodore Roosevelt and Franklin Delano Roosevelt, presidents of the United States, were not only of Dutch descent but cousins. Martin Van Buren was another president of Dutch descent. Martin Kalbfleisch served as a U.S. Representative for the state of New York. Pete Hoekstra served as congressman for the state of Michigan's 2nd congressional district from 1993 until 2011. On January 10, 2018, he took office as United States Ambassador to the Netherlands. Jacob Aaron Westervelt was a renowned and prolific shipbuilder and Mayor of New York (1853–1855).

In science and technology, inventor and businessman Thomas Edison was of Dutch descent. Nicolaas Bloembergen won the Nobel Prize in 1981 for his work in laser spectroscopy. He was also awarded the Lorentz Medal in 1978. Physicists Samuel Abraham Goudsmit and George Eugene Uhlenbeck proposed the concept of electron spin. Goudsmit was also the scientific head of the Operation Alsos mission in the Manhattan Project. Tjalling Koopmans was the recipient of the Nobel Prize in Economics in 1975.

In astronomy, Maarten Schmidt pioneered the research of quasars. Astronomer Gerard Kuiper discovered two new moons in the Solar System and predicted the existence of the Kuiper belt, which is named in his honor. Popular astronomer Bart J. Bok won the Klumpke-Roberts Award in 1982 and the Bruce Medal in 1977. Jan Schilt invented the Schilt photometer.

In sports, Hall of Fame baseball player and two-time World Series champion Bert Blyleven gained fame for his curveball. Earl Bascom was a Hall of Fame rodeo champion known as the "father of modern rodeo." Golfer Tiger Woods has Dutch ancestry through his mother.

In religion, Albertus van Raalte was a Reformed Church of America pastor who led the Dutch immigrants who founded the city of Holland, Michigan in 1846. Louis Berkhof, a Reformed systematic theologian, is greatly studied today in seminaries and Bible colleges. Herman Hoeksema, a theologian, was instrumental in the series of events that precipitated the creation of the Protestant Reformed Church. Prominent Christian author Lewis B. Smedes wrote Forgive and Forget, an influential work discussing a religious view on sexuality and forgiveness. Menno Simons (1496 – January 31, 1561) was a former Catholic priest from the Friesland region of the Netherlands who became an influential Anabaptist religious leader. Simons was a contemporary of the Protestant Reformers and it is from his name that his followers became known as Mennonites.

== See also ==
- Dutch Americans in Michigan
- Dutch Americans in New York City
- Dutch Canadians
- Dutch West Indian Americans
- Dutch, the magazine
- European Americans
- Hyphenated American
- Netherlands–United States relations
- Surinamese Americans
- Van (Dutch)
