= KSBW =

Television station in Salinas, California

- Salinas–Monterey–Santa Cruz, California; United States
- City: Salinas, California
- Channels: Digital: 8 (VHF); Virtual: 8
- Branding: KSBW 8; Action News 8; Central Coast ABC (8.2); Estrella TV Costa Central (8.3)

Programming
- Affiliations: 8.1: NBC; 8.2: ABC; for others, see § Subchannels

Ownership
- Owner: Hearst Television; (Hearst Stations Inc.)

History
- First air date: September 11, 1953
- Former call signs: KSBW-TV (1953–1987)
- Former channel numbers: Analog: 8 (VHF, 1953–2009); Digital: 10 (VHF, 2002–2009)
- Former affiliations: All secondary: DuMont (1953–1955); ABC (1953–1960); CBS (1953–1969)
- Call sign meaning: "Salad Bowl of the World", nickname for Salinas

Technical information
- Licensing authority: FCC
- Facility ID: 19653
- ERP: 20.6 kW
- HAAT: 760 m (2,493 ft)
- Transmitter coordinates: 36°45′22.8″N 121°30′8.7″W

Links
- Public license information: Public file; LMS
- Website: www.ksbw.com

KSBW (channel 8) is a television station licensed to Salinas, California, United States, serving the Monterey Bay area as an affiliate of NBC and ABC. Owned by Hearst Television, the station has studios on John Street (Highway 68) in downtown Salinas, and its transmitter is located on Fremont Peak in the Gabilan Mountains.

KSBW-TV began broadcasting on September 11, 1953. It was originally a shared-time operation with KMBY-TV, which operated from Monterey; the stations were outgrowths of radio stations KSBW and KMBY and shared programs from all four major television networks. KSBW bought out KMBY in 1955, becoming the sole station on channel 8. In 1957, its owners began operating KSBY in San Luis Obispo as a semi-satellite; the two stations remained commonly owned for more than three decades, and KSBW became the dominant local news outlet in the area. It retained this status despite a series of ownership transfers in the 1980s and 1990s, during which time Elisabeth Murdoch and her husband briefly owned KSBW and KSBY.

Hearst acquired KSBW in 1998 as part of a trade with Sunrise Television Corporation. Under Hearst, KSBW was the first station in the area to broadcast a digital signal. In 2011, it launched Central Coast ABC, a local in-market ABC affiliate, as a digital subchannel.

== History ==
=== The shared-time years ===
When the Federal Communications Commission (FCC) allocated television channels in 1952 and ended a multi-year freeze on station applications, it placed two channels—very high frequency (VHF) channel 8 and ultra high frequency (UHF) channel 28—in the Salinas–Monterey area. Two applications were received for channel 8, each from a major local radio station: KSBW of Salinas and KMBY of Monterey.

To break the logjam that awaited the competing applications, including a possible comparative hearing, KSBW and KMBY set television precedent when they agreed to share use of channel 8. On that basis, the FCC approved both stations on February 19, 1953, as the first shared-time TV operation in the country. Channel 8 would be broadcast from Mount Toro, where a defunct FM radio station, KSNI, had already built a tower and transmitter facilities. KSBW-TV and KMBY-TV would provide the programs on an alternating basis from separate studios in Salinas and Monterey, respectively. The commission assented in large part because it found KSBW and KMBY were not competing for the same sponsors, each primarily serving their own city. KSBW–KMBY announced a May 1 start date, but this was held up when the grantee for channel 28, Salinas–Monterey Television Company (with the call letters KICU), protested to the FCC, which stayed its authorization of channel 8. Its contention was that the two radio stations—each with separate network ties—KSBW with NBC and KMBY with CBS—had the intention to air programming from all four major networks (those two plus ABC and DuMont), thus tying up all networks in the area and leaving nothing for channel 28. It raised the possibility that the San Francisco Chronicle, which owned San Francisco NBC affiliate KRON-TV and was a minority owner of KSBW, would do everything it could to protect KSBW-TV; likewise, it believed CBS would be highly protective of KMBY-TV, given that KMBY radio was owned by entertainer and CBS personality Bing Crosby. The FCC heard arguments on the matter in late June, rejecting KICU's protest and permitting KSBW-TV and KMBY-TV to begin construction.

KSBW-TV and KMBY-TV began broadcasting on September 11, 1953, as primary affiliates of CBS with additional programs from ABC and DuMont. At the outset, the only local programming originated from the Salinas studios of KSBW-TV. The two stations sold advertising separately for network programs when they aired on assigned nights and planned to split advertising sales for special events. (Note: While KSBW–KMBY was the first shared-time channel authorized and was billed in the local press as the first in the nation when it went on the air, this was not the case by September 11 as other shared-time authorizations were made. On August 2, KMBC-TV and WHB-TV began on channel 9 in Kansas City. On September 1, WTCN-TV and WMIN-TV began broadcasting on channel 11 in Minneapolis.)

After four months of negotiations, KSBW-TV agreed to buy KMBY-TV in November 1954. KMBY radio was marked for divestiture. By then, the station was also airing NBC programs. The transaction was approved in February 1955, leaving KSBW-TV as the full-time user of channel 8. The DuMont network wound down operations later that year.

=== Partnership with KSBY ===
In 1956, John Cohan, the lead stockholder in KSBW radio and television, agreed to acquire KVEC radio and television in San Luis Obispo for $450,000. In June 1957, the San Luis Obispo station became KSBY and began receiving its programs via a microwave link from Salinas. While the pairing maintained studios in Salinas and San Luis Obispo, the combination was promoted as the Gold Coast Stations, and they began carrying the same mix of CBS, ABC, and NBC network programming.

The Salinas Valley Broadcasting Corporation, parent company of both stations as well as KSBW radio in Salinas, agreed to be purchased in 1960 by Paul Harron and Gordon Gray, who together owned radio and television properties in upstate New York. The deal never materialized; instead, president and general manager John Cohan and three associates took control of the station in a transaction announced that October. KSBW and KSBY were no longer ABC affiliates by 1962; in the Salinas portion of the market, KNTV in San Jose was carrying the CBS and NBC shows that could not be fit on KSBW–KSBY's schedule, while KEYT in Santa Barbara became a full-time ABC affiliate in September 1963. In 1964, a second station went on the air in Santa Maria: KCOY-TV (channel 12), which in 1965 sought to force KSBY to become an exclusive CBS affiliate so as to protect its NBC affiliation. The opposite would take place four years later: on January 12, 1969, KSBY became a primary NBC affiliate and KCOY-TV a primary CBS affiliate. CBS found itself an affiliate on the northern Central Coast when it aligned with KMST (channel 46), a new station which began in February 1969. During this time, in 1968, KSBW AM was sold to Thomas J. King and changed its call sign to KTOM.

The ownership consortium, later known as Central California Communications Corporation, also owned the cable systems in Salinas and San Luis Obispo. The FCC ordered Central California Communications Corporation to file for operation of KSBY on a standalone, non-satellite basis in 1975, on account of its financial condition; the order stemmed from a dispute with Gill Industries, owner of KNTV, over the combination of KSBW and KSBY viewership figures for ratings purposes in the Salinas–Monterey market, where the stations' competition—KNTV and KMST in the north and KCOY-TV in the south—did not serve the same area.

KSBW and KSBY were acquired in 1979 by John Blair & Co., a New York firm that represented TV and radio stations to national advertisers. The company owned two radio stations but no TV stations. During Blair's ownership, the station received approval to build a tower on Mount Madonna, almost on the border between Santa Cruz and Santa Clara counties, which it projected would improve its coverage in southern Santa Clara County and add 80,000 homes to its coverage area. The new facility went into service in 1984, but in attempting to make inroads in San Jose, KSBW lost households in southern Monterey County where reception was poorer than previously predicted.

In 1986, Blair fended off a hostile takeover attempt by Macfadden Acquisition Corporation by accepting a competing, higher offer from Reliance Capital Group, led by financier Saul Steinberg. Reliance, however, did not buy Blair intending to keep its three English-language TV stations: KSBW, KSBY, and KOKH-TV in Oklahoma City; rather, it was interested in the Spanish-language stations in Miami and San Juan, Puerto Rico, which were used to launch the Telemundo network in January 1987. As a result, Blair sold KSBW, KSBY, and KOKH-TV to Gillett Communications for $86 million in November 1986.

=== Three sales in three years ===
Gillett financed its ventures by issuing junk bonds and became burdened by a heavy debt load. The parent company, Gillett Holdings, filed for Chapter 11 bankruptcy reorganization in 1991; the next year, many of its subsidiaries, including KSBW, filed their own bankruptcy cases to protect the station from possible legal issues in the Gillett case. The companies emerged from bankruptcy in October 1992 with ownership having been assumed by Gillett's debtholders. In 1994, KSBW and KSBY went on the market as a package, with Gillett Holdings seeking between $30 and $40 million and receiving multiple offers.

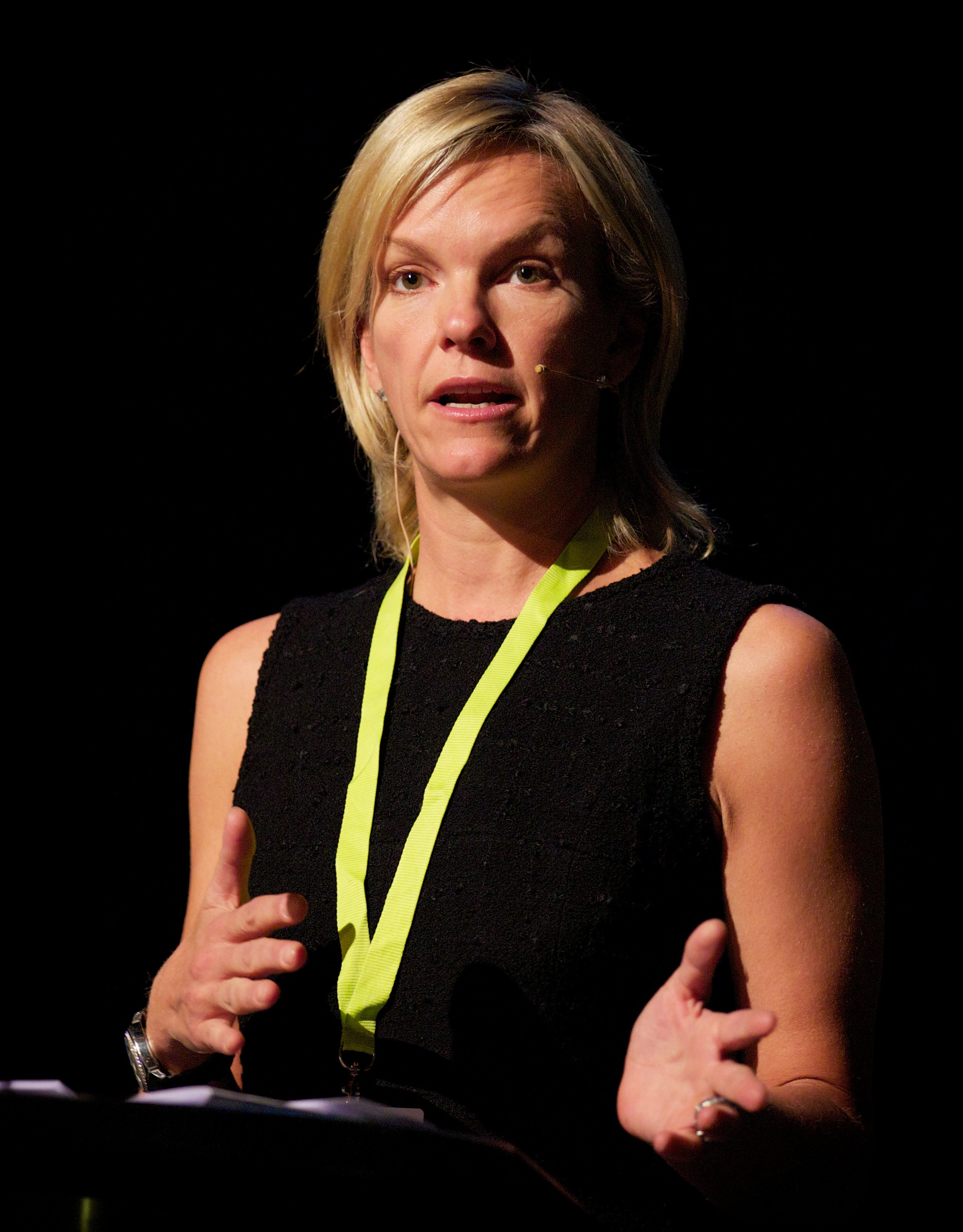
Elisabeth Murdoch (pictured in 2010) owned KSBW from 1994 to 1995.

Gillett announced on March 25, 1994, that KSBW and KSBY would be sold to EP Communications, a new company formed by Elisabeth Murdoch—daughter of media mogul Rupert Murdoch, owner of the Fox network—and her husband, Elkin Pianim. The Los Angeles Times reported a month before the announcement that Rupert Murdoch was interested in giving his daughter and son-in-law hands-on experience running a business. Elisabeth Murdoch had previously worked at Australia's Nine Network and Fox, including a stint as the programming manager of Fox's station in Salt Lake City, Utah, KSTU. There was also speculation that the stations could switch to Fox: at the time, Fox had no affiliate on the southern Central Coast, though Salinas-based KCBA aired the network's programming. However, Elisabeth Murdoch was also reported to be taking pains to separate the running of the Central Coast stations from her father's media empire. EP Communications paid $35 million for the pair; the transaction was primarily financed by Commonwealth Bank of Australia, a longtime banker for Rupert Murdoch's media ventures, and was personally guaranteed by Rupert Murdoch.

After four months, Murdoch—who had been splitting her time between Salinas and San Luis Obispo—hired a manager to run KSBY and devoted her time to running KSBW. This was much-needed, particularly as KSBY underwent significant turnover during Murdoch ownership, including the firing of its general manager and longtime lead anchor. During this time, KSBW won a Peabody Award, given to the station for a program on youth violence known as Just Because: Tales of Violence, Dreams of Peace. In hindsight, observers noted that Murdoch brought to KSBW and KSBY a larger-market style that was at odds with the stations' prior image, but it was more aggressive and professional with fewer on-air errors. The stations were able to quickly improve their financial positions on account of reduced program costs and a 50-percent increase in network compensation from NBC. In a year when advertising sales were flat, cash flow increased 42 percent.

In September 1995, EP Communications announced the sale of KSBW and KSBY to separate owners. SJL Broadcasting acquired KSBY, while Smith Television—owner of KEYT in Santa Barbara—acquired KSBW. Murdoch and Pianim claimed in a statement that consolidation in the TV station industry forced them to either get bigger or sell, though a station employee claimed they were told a good unsolicited offer resulted in the sale. The acquisition and sale of KSBW and KSBY after just 18 months resulted in a net gain of $12.25 million for Murdoch and Pianim. Months later, Smith Broadcasting negotiated to buy the assets of KCCN—the former KMST— but talks broke down.

Smith Television put its four television stations on the market in September 1996, citing interest stemming from deregulation in the Telecommunications Act of 1996 signed earlier that year, only to sell itself to a new joint venture of Smith and Hicks, Muse, Tate & Furst, a private equity firm that also held an increased involvement in radio station ownership. This company became known as Sunrise Television Corporation.

=== Hearst ownership ===
Sunrise Television agreed with Hearst-Argyle Television in February 1998 to a trade of stations. Sunrise received WDTN in Dayton, Ohio, and the license for WNAC-TV in Providence, Rhode Island, plus $20 million; in exchange, Hearst acquired KSBW as well as WPTZ in Plattsburgh, New York, and the associated WNNE in White River Junction, Vermont. The swap allowed Hearst-Argyle to divest of the Dayton station, which it had to sell as a condition of the previous merger of Hearst and Argyle. Hearst-Argyle became Hearst Television in 2009, when the Hearst Corporation acquired Argyle's stake in the venture and took it private.

Hearst-Argyle effectively reversed the effect of the Mount Madonna relocation in 2000 by moving KSBW's transmitter to Fremont Peak, restoring the lost coverage in southern Monterey County. The Mount Madonna mast was later leased to Etheric Networks to provide wireless internet service.

KSBW was the first station on the northern Central Coast to begin digital broadcasting, activating its digital transmitter on October 30, 2002. By 2007, it offered a second subchannel utilizing NBC Weather Plus as well as a local 10 p.m. newscast. In August 2010, the station debuted "PrimePlus", a prime time block on the subchannel from 7 to 10:30 p.m. featuring encores of its evening news, Access Hollywood, Dr. Phil, and Oprah, followed by the 10 p.m. news. Weather Plus programming continued to be carried outside of these hours.

In December 2010, KSBW announced it would replace the subchannel with a full secondary channel affiliated with ABC, providing an in-market ABC affiliate for the first time in a decade. (Note: KNTV had been the ABC affiliate of record for the Salinas–Monterey area until 2001, when it dropped the network in preparation to become the San Francisco area's NBC station on January 1, 2002. KGO-TV, the ABC-owned station in San Francisco, was added to cable systems to continue to provide network service.) The channel, with the branding Central Coast ABC, launched on April 18, 2011, displacing San Francisco's KGO-TV on cable systems; Hearst invested $1.4 million to expand the facilities to handle the additional service. In the May 2012 sweeps period, Central Coast ABC trailed only KSBW–NBC in total-day viewership in the market. The Spanish-language network Estrella TV was added as a subchannel in 2016.

== News operation ==
KSBW has generally dominated television ratings for news and other programming on the northern Central Coast, far outdistancing its competition in the form of KION and KCBA. It had tenured on-air personalities, including Jim Vanderzwaan, who spent 32 years as the station's chief weather forecaster, and Dennis Lehnen, who retired after 35 years presenting sports.

With the closure of the news department at KION-TV, KSBW became the only television news operation in the Monterey area.

=== Notable former on-air staff ===
- Christine Craft – weathercaster, sportscaster and anchor, 1975–1976
- Dina Eastwood – reporter and anchor, 1991–1997 (known as Dina Ruiz at KSBW)
- Del Rodgers – sports anchor
- Ted Rowlands – reporter

== Technical information ==
=== Subchannels ===
KSBW's transmitter is located on Fremont Peak in the Gabilan Mountains. The station's signal is multiplexed:

Subchannels of KSBW
Subchannel	Res.	Short name	Programming
8.1	1080i	KSBW	NBC
8.2	720p	CC ABC	ABC
8.3	480i	EST	Estrella TV
8.4	480i	STORY	Story Television
8.5	480i	OUTLAW	Outlaw

=== Analog-to-digital conversion ===
KSBW shut down its analog signal, over VHF channel 8, on June 12, 2009, the official date on which full-power television stations in the United States transitioned from analog to digital broadcasts under federal mandate. The station's digital signal relocated from its pre-transition VHF channel 10 to channel 8.
