= KVEC =

- San Luis Obispo, California; United States
- Broadcast area: San Luis Obispo County, California
- Frequency: 920 kHz
- Branding: News Talk 920

Programming
- Format: News/talk
- Affiliations: ABC News Radio; CBS News Radio; Compass Media Networks; Premiere Networks

Ownership
- Owner: American General Media; (AGM California, Inc.)
- Sister stations: KKAL; KKJG; KSTT-FM; KZOZ

History
- First air date: 1937 (at 1200)
- Former frequencies: 1200 kHz (1937–1941); 1230 kHz (1941–1946)
- Call sign meaning: Valley Electric Company (original owner)

Technical information
- Licensing authority: FCC
- Facility ID: 10870
- Class: B
- Power: 1,000 watts day; 500 watts night
- Transmitter coordinates: 35°17′57.9″N 120°40′27.6″W
- Translator: 96.5 K243CL (San Luis Obispo)

Links
- Public license information: Public file; LMS
- Webcast: Listen live
- Website: www.920kvec.com

KVEC (920 AM) is a commercial radio station that is licensed to San Luis Obispo, California, United States and serves the Central Coast of California. The station is owned by American General Media and broadcasts a news/talk radio format featuring a variety of nationally syndicated talk shows as well as a program hosted by Dave Congalton.

KVEC is rebroadcast on FM translator station K243CL on 96.5 MHz in San Luis Obispo.

== History ==
KVEC first signed on in 1937 on the 1200 kHz frequency. The station originally was owned by Valley Electric Company (hence its call sign), headed by Christina M. Jacobson. In March 1941, under the terms of the NARBA Havana Treaty, KVEC was relocated to 1230 kHz. The station changed frequencies once more in 1946 to 920 kHz.

In April 1956, Jacobson sold KVEC and its television sister station KVEC-TV (channel 6) to The Valley Enterprises Company for $450,000. The media company, headed by John C. Cohan, was the owner of KSBW-AM-TV in Salinas, California. Cohan took sole ownership of KVEC and its TV counterpart, then known as KSBY-TV, the following year. In November 1965, Cohen sold KVEC and its three-year-old FM sister station (now KZOZ) to West Coast Broadcasters Inc., majority owned by James L. Sephier, for $360,000. On January 6, 1975, West Coast Broadcasters sold KVEC to Century Broadcasting Company for $500,000.

The 1980s and 1990s saw KVEC face a series of financial troubles and ownership changes. In 1985, Five Cities Broadcasting Inc. purchased the station from the Century Broadcasting Company Liquidating Trust for $500,000 and paired it with KPGA (95.3 FM). However, the following year, Five Cities defaulted on a loan, leading to the involuntary transfer of both stations' licenses to U.S. Media Company. In August 1989, U.S. Media sold news/talk-formatted KVEC to Chorro Communications Inc. for $300,000; KPGA was divested separately a month later. In September 1991, Richard Mason sold his 70% stake in Chorro Communications to partner Francis Sheahan for $353,900, granting the latter full control of KVEC. Portions of the proceeds were used to settle a debt owed to Mason and to pay taxes owed to the Internal Revenue Service.

In November 2000, Clear Channel Communications purchased KVEC from Chorro for $950,000 as part of a nationwide station buying spree. In July 2007, the station was among 16 Clear Channel outlets in California and Arizona that were sold to El Dorado Broadcasters for $40 million. In early 2016, El Dorado began selling off its Central Coast stations. These divestitures included KVEC, sold to Bakersfield, California-based American General Media for $450,000 that May.
