= Ted Rowlands (newscaster) =

American newscaster (born 1966)

Edward Hugh "Ted" Rowlands (born September 27, 1966) is an American newscaster who previously worked at CNN, KSBW in Salinas, CA as well as KNTV Channel 11 and KTVU Channel 2 in the Bay Area. He is currently employed by Court TV.

== Career ==
Rowlands is a general assignment correspondent for CNN based in Chicago. Rowlands is best known for his coverage of high-profile criminal cases, including Scott Peterson, Michael Jackson, O. J. Simpson, Cary Stayner and Phil Spector.

Rowlands was CNN's lead reporter in the death of Michael Jackson and for the trial of Dr. Conrad Murray for the involuntary manslaughter of Michael Jackson.

== Personal life ==
Rowland is married to Erica Sanson.
