= KXDZ =

Simulcasting KXTZ, Pismo Beach, CA
- Templeton, California; United States
- Broadcast area: San Luis Obispo, California
- Frequency: 100.5 MHz
- Branding: 95.3 The Beach

Programming
- Format: Adult hits

Ownership
- Owner: Martha Fahnoe; (Dimes Media Corporation)
- Sister stations: KPYG, KWWV, KXTZ, KYNS

History
- First air date: 2001

Technical information
- Licensing authority: FCC
- Facility ID: 70781
- Class: A
- ERP: 1,350 watts
- HAAT: 110 meters (360 ft)
- Transmitter coordinates: 35°30′19″N 120°37′18″W

Links
- Public license information: Public file; LMS
- Webcast: Listen live
- Website: 953thebeach.com

KXDZ (100.5 FM, "The Beach") is a commercial radio station licensed to Templeton, California, United States. The station, established in 2001, is currently owned by Martha Fahnoe and the license is held by Dimes Media Corporation.

== Programming ==
KXDZ airs a classic hits music format branded as "95.3 The Beach", in simulcast with sister station KXTZ, to the greater San Luis Obispo, California, area. This format features adult rock hits primarily from the 1980s and early 1990s. The station duopoly had been known as "The California Sound" until a September 2002 branding shift that affected both stations. While the station has maintained essentially the same format since it signed on in 2001, several on-air hosts were shuffled to new shifts or replaced in a March 2005 shakeup.

== History ==
This station received its original construction permit from the Federal Communications Commission on April 24, 1998. The new station was assigned the KXDZ call sign by the FCC on February 22, 2001. KXDZ received its license to cover from the FCC on July 13, 2001.

Logo used until May 2011.

In August 2001, licensee Walter D. Howard applied to the FCC to transfer the broadcast license for KXDZ to Howard Broadcasting, Inc. The transfer was approved by the FCC on August 22, 2001, and the transaction was consummated on August 27, 2001. Howard Broadcasting was in turn owned by Winsome Media, a joint venture formed by Walter D. Howard and his son, Bruce Howard.

In April 2002, Winsome Media and Howard Broadcasting, Inc., reached an agreement to sell this station to Mapleton Communications, LLC, as part of a three-station deal valued at $1.8 million. The deal was approved by the FCC on May 23, 2002, and the transaction was consummated on July 19, 2002.

Mapleton Communications sold KXDZ and its sister stations KPYG, KWWV, KXTZ, and KYNS to Martha Fahnoe's Dimes Media Corporation for $1 million; the sale closed on January 15, 2015.

In 2023, "The Beach" picked up Bob Srei's "Grunge Garage" which air at sister station KYNS prior to the switch from Alternative to Country.
