= KSNI-FM =

- Santa Maria, California; United States
- Broadcast area: Santa Maria, California
- Frequency: 102.5 MHz
- Branding: Sunny Country 102.5

Programming
- Format: Country

Ownership
- Owner: American General Media; (AGM California, LLC)
- Sister stations: KBOX, KPAT, KRQK, KSMA

History
- First air date: 1960
- Former call signs: KSMA-FM (1960–1980)
- Call sign meaning: "Sunny"

Technical information
- Licensing authority: FCC
- Facility ID: 4122
- Class: B
- ERP: 13,500 watts
- HAAT: 262 meters (860 ft)
- Transmitter coordinates: 34.836°N 120.403°W

Links
- Public license information: Public file; LMS
- Webcast: Listen live
- Website: sunnycountry.com

KSNI-FM (102.5 FM, "Sunny Country 102.5") is a commercial radio station licensed to Santa Maria, California, United States, and serves the Santa Maria—Lompoc, California area. The station is owned by American General Media and broadcasts a country music format.

== History ==
=== KSMA-FM ===
The station was first signed on in 1960 as KSMA-FM by James M. Hagerman and John I. Groom. It simulcast the full-service format of its AM sister station KSMA (1240 AM), airing a mix of news, sports, and middle of the road music. Stereophonic sound broadcasts began in 1970.

In January 1980, Hagerman and Nona M. Groom sold KSMA-AM and FM to Bayliss Broadcasting Company for $1.4 million. The company was owned by John Bayliss, who resigned from his position as president of Gannett Company's radio division to manage the Santa Maria stations. The Federal Communications Commission (FCC) approved the sale on May 12.

=== KSNI-FM ===
Upon the change in ownership, Bayliss ended KSMA-FM's simulcast of KSMA after two decades and programmed it separately as a beautiful music outlet. The FM station changed its call sign to KSNI-FM in August 1980. The format lasted only three years as the station flipped to country music in 1983, adopting the branding "Sunny Country".

On March 1, 1989, the transmitters for KSNI-FM and three other stations in Santa Maria were knocked off the air due to acts of vandalism. Around 1 a.m., two males, ages 18 and 15, broke into the transmitters' circuit breakers and switched them off; the signals were restored within an hour. That same day at 9:14 p.m., the towers fell as guy wires supporting the structures had been severed. Total damage was estimated to be $100,000.

In August 1999, Bayliss Broadcasting sold KSNI-FM and KSMA to Fresno, California-based Mondosphere Broadcasting for $3.75 million. The new owner took possession of the combo on September 30.

KSNI-FM changed hands twice in the 2000s. In September 2000, Mondosphere sold 11 stations throughout Central California, including KSNI-FM, plus a construction permit for a twelfth station, to Clear Channel Communications for $45 million. In July 2007, KSNI-FM was one of 16 stations in California and Arizona which Clear Channel sold to El Dorado Broadcasters for $40 million.

During the week of January 18, 2010, a storm in the Santa Maria area triggered a power outage that knocked KSNI-FM and several other stations off the air. The station resumed broadcasting under generator power after two hours of silence.

From April 2012 to April 2016, KSNI-FM was simulcast on sister station KSLY-FM (96.1 FM) in the adjacent San Luis Obispo market. The two stations co-branded as "Sunny Country 102.5 & 96.1".

In early 2016, El Dorado began selling off its stations on the Central Coast of California. KSNI-FM and KSMA constituted the first of these divestments as, on February 26, American General Media purchased the pair for $1.5 million. The close of the transaction in April ended the simulcast of Sunny Country on KSLY-FM, which remained with El Dorado and launched a competing country format.
