= KXTZ =

- Pismo Beach, California; United States
- Broadcast area: San Luis Obispo, California
- Frequency: 95.3 MHz
- Branding: 95.3 The Beach

Programming
- Format: Adult hits

Ownership
- Owner: Martha Fahnoe; (Dimes Media Corporation)
- Sister stations: KPYG, KWWV, KXDZ, KYNS

History
- First air date: December 7, 1974
- Former call signs: KPGA (1974–1990); KWBR (1990–1998)

Technical information
- Licensing authority: FCC
- Facility ID: 30108
- Class: A
- ERP: 4,200 watts
- HAAT: 119 meters (390 ft)
- Transmitter coordinates: 35°09′24″N 120°38′11″W

Links
- Public license information: Public file; LMS
- Webcast: Listen live
- Website: 953thebeach.com

KXTZ (95.3 FM, "95.3 The Beach") is a commercial radio station licensed to San Luis Obispo, California, United States. The station is owned by Dimes Media Corporation and broadcasts an adult hits format with a focus on rock music from the 1980s. KXTZ is simulcast on sister station KXDZ in Templeton, California at 100.5 FM.

== History ==
The station first signed on December 7, 1974 as KPGA and broadcast a middle of the road music format. In 1975, original owner James M. Strain sold KPGA to Jack and Lois Gale for $70,000; the deal was approved by the U.S. Federal Communications Commission on October 17. In May 1978, owing to his declining health, Jack Gale sold his share in KPGA to his business partners Charles A. and Patricia Kent, doing business as KPGA Inc., for $6,000. The Kents sold the adult contemporary music-formatted station to Five Cities Broadcasting Corporation for $500,000 in April 1985.

In September 1989, U.S. Media Company, who took possession of KPGA's license after Five Cities defaulted on a loan in 1986, sold the station to James H. Elison for $1.05 million. On March 2, 1990, KPGA changed its call letters to KWBR.

Elison's Maverick Broadcasting Company had reached an agreement to sell KWBR to American General Media for $500,000 in December 1996; however, the deal fell through. Instead, the following March, the rock-formatted station was purchased for $350,000 by Winsome Media LLC, based in Cambria, California and owned by Walter D. Howard and Delbert E. Cleft, Jr. On April 17, 1998, the station adopted the KXTZ call sign.

In April 2002, Howard Broadcasting, Inc. sold KXTZ to Mapleton Communications as part of a three-station deal valued at $1.5 million. The deal was approved by the FCC on May 23, 2002 and the transaction was consummated on July 19.

In late 2014, Mapleton Communications sold KXTZ and sister stations KPYG, KWWV, KXDZ, and KYNS to Martha Fahnoe's Dimes Media Corporation for $1 million. The sale closed on January 15, 2015.
