= KSMA (AM) =

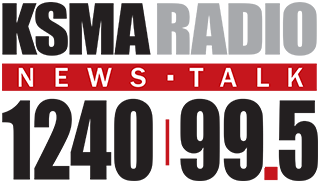
- Santa Maria, California; United States
- Broadcast area: Santa Maria—Lompoc area
- Frequency: 1240 kHz
- Branding: KSMA Radio

Programming
- Format: Talk radio
- Affiliations: Fox News Radio; Compass Media Networks; Premiere Networks; Westwood One; Los Angeles Rams

Ownership
- Owner: American General Media; (AGM California, Inc.)
- Sister stations: KBOX, KPAT, KRQK, KSNI-FM

History
- First air date: 1946
- Former call signs: KSMA (1946–2007); KSMX (2007–2016)
- Former frequencies: 1450 kHz (1946–1949)
- Call sign meaning: Santa Maria

Technical information
- Licensing authority: FCC
- Facility ID: 4123
- Class: C
- Power: 1,000 watts (unlimited)
- Transmitter coordinates: 34°57′1.9″N 120°29′30.6″W
- Translator: 99.5 K258CY (Santa Maria)

Links
- Public license information: Public file; LMS
- Webcast: Listen live
- Website: 1240ksma.com

KSMA (1240 AM) is a commercial radio station licensed to Santa Maria, California, United States, and serves the Santa Maria-Lompoc area. The station is owned by American General Media and broadcasts a talk format. KSMA is rebroadcast on FM translator K258CY at 99.5 FM in Santa Maria. KSMA is an affiliate of the Los Angeles Rams radio network.

== History ==
KSMA was the first radio station in Santa Maria, signing on in 1946 at 1450 AM. Its original owners were Hugh G., Charles A., and Mareby Cardella Shurtliff, and Cleo Agnes Center. In 1947, the station was sold to Santa Maria Broadcasting Company, owned by R.H. Hardenbergh and W.J. Davison, for $32,500. On July 13, 1948, Santa Maria Broadcasting sold KSMA to John M. Poole for $20,750; the deal was approved by the Federal Communications Commission (FCC) December 9. On October 17, 1949, the FCC approved KSMA's request to move to 1240 AM. After only two years of ownership, in December 1950, Poole sold the station to James Hagerman and John I. Groom for $27,500.

From its inception through the 1960s, KSMA aired a full service format, airing a mix of news, sports, and middle of the road music. It was one of the original stations of the San Francisco 49ers radio network that began airing games during the inaugural 1949 All-America Football Conference season. The studios were originally located in downtown Santa Maria next to the old post office before the downtown area underwent renovation in the 1980s.

Following Groom's death in 1976, in accordance with his will, the FCC granted Hagerman complete control of the licenses of KSMA and its FM sister station KSMA-FM. Groom's share of the stations, however, was transferred to his wife, Nona M. Groom.

In January 1980, Hagerman and Nona Groom sold KSMA AM and FM to Bayliss Broadcasting Company for $1.4 million. The company was owned by John Bayliss, who resigned from his position as president of Gannett Company's radio division to manage the Santa Maria stations. The FCC approved the sale on May 12. In 1986, KSMA began broadcasting an oldies format.

In August 1999, Bayliss Broadcasting sold KSMA and its FM sister station, then known as KSNI-FM, to Fresno-based Mondosphere Broadcasting for $3.75 million. The new owner took possession of the combo on September 30.

Logo for KSMX used until May 2016.

KSMA changed hands twice during the 2000s. In September 2000, Mondosphere Broadcasting Inc. sold 11 stations throughout Central California, including KSMA, plus a construction permit for a twelfth station, to Clear Channel Communications for $45 million. In July 2007, KSMA and KSNI-FM were among 16 Clear Channel stations in California and Arizona purchased by El Dorado Broadcasters for $40 million. On November 30, 2007, the station changed call letters to KSMX.

In early 2016, El Dorado began selling off its stations on the Central Coast. The first of these divestitures was KSMX and KSNI-FM, sold together on February 26 to American General Media (AGM) for $1.5 million. KSMX changed its call sign back to KSMA on May 16.
