= KERW =

Coordinates: 35.360°N 120.656°W

- Los Osos-Baywood Park, California; United States
- Broadcast area: San Luis Obispo, California; Santa Maria–Lompoc, California
- Frequency: 101.3 MHz
- Branding: 101.3 The Grade

Programming
- Format: Classic country

Ownership
- Owner: Dimes Media

History
- First air date: 1987; 39 years ago (as KEDZ)
- Former call signs: KEDZ (1986–1987); KLZZ (1987–1990); KSTT-FM (1990–2016); KJRW (2016)
- Call sign meaning: Disambiguation of former parent station KCRW

Technical information
- Licensing authority: FCC
- Facility ID: 63523
- Class: B
- ERP: 3,600 watts
- HAAT: 502 meters (1,647 ft)

Links
- Public license information: Public file; LMS
- Webcast: Listen Live
- Website: thegradecountry.com

KERW (101.3 FM) is a radio station that is licensed to Los Osos-Baywood Park, California and broadcasts to the San Luis Obispo, California area. The station is owned by Dimes Media and broadcasts a classic country format known as "101.3 The Grade". The KERW transmitter is located off TV Towers Road on Cuesta Peak in Santa Margarita.

== History ==
The station at 101.3 FM first signed on the air in 1987 as KEDZ, but it soon changed its call sign to KLZZ. It broadcast an adult contemporary music format from the beginning.

=== KSTT-FM ===
On March 9, 1989, Diaz Broadcasting sold KLZZ to Stratosphere Broadcasting L.P. (later Mondosphere Broadcasting Inc.) for $1.3 million. On December 1, 1990, the station changed its call letters to KSTT-FM.

The ownership of KSTT-FM changed several times during the 2000s. In September 2000, Mondosphere Broadcasting sold 11 stations throughout Central California, including KSTT-FM, plus a construction permit for a twelfth station, to Clear Channel Communications Inc. for $45 million. In July 2007, the station was one of 16 Clear Channel outlets in California and Arizona purchased by El Dorado Broadcasters for $40 million.

=== KERW ===
In early 2016, El Dorado Broadcasters began divesting its stations on the Central Coast. On May 31, the company sold the intellectual property of KSTT-FM, branded "Coast 101.3", to American General Media, who placed the call letters and AC format on KIQO (102.5 FM). The 101.3 FM frequency itself was not sold but remained with El Dorado and adopted the call sign KJRW.

In July 2016, El Dorado donated KJRW to Santa Monica College, owner of public radio station KCRW. The last in a series of divestments by El Dorado, the donation was consummated on September 15. On November 7, KERW began simulcasting "Eclectic 24", KCRW's adult album alternative-formatted HD2 subchannel.

On April 10, 2026, KERW (as a result of a sale to Dimes Media) changed their format from the eclectic-formatted KCRW-HD2 simulcast to classic country, branded as "101.3 The Grade".
