= KBOX =

- Lompoc, California; United States
- Broadcast area: Santa Maria–Lompoc, California
- Frequency: 104.1 MHz
- Branding: Pirate Radio 104.1

Programming
- Format: Adult hits
- Affiliations: Westwood One

Ownership
- Owner: American General Media; (AGM California, Inc.)
- Sister stations: KPAT, KRQK, KSNI-FM, KSMA

History
- First air date: December 24, 1968
- Former call signs: KLOM-FM (1968–1979); KLPC-FM (1979–1984); KXCC-FM (1984–1986)
- Former frequencies: 92.7 MHz (1968–1989)
- Call sign meaning: Box

Technical information
- Licensing authority: FCC
- Facility ID: 7049
- Class: B1
- ERP: 3,300 watts
- HAAT: 274 meters (899 ft)
- Transmitter coordinates: 34°44′29.9″N 120°26′48.5″W

Links
- Public license information: Public file; LMS
- Webcast: Listen live
- Website: www.1041pirateradio.com

KBOX (104.1 FM, "Pirate Radio 104.1") is a commercial radio station licensed to Lompoc, California, United States, and serves the Santa Maria–Lompoc area. The station is owned by American General Media and broadcasts an adult hits format. It is programmed locally with support from Radiocrunch and is no longer featuring programming provided via satellite by Westwood One.

== History ==
The station first signed on December 24, 1968 as KLOM-FM on the 92.7 FM frequency. Originally, the station was owned by Communications Corporation of America and broadcast a middle of the road music format as a simulcast of its AM sister station KLOM (1330 AM, now defunct). On October 9, 1975, Communications Corporation of America sold KLOM-AM-FM to Robert D. Janecek for $200,000.

In April 1979, KLOM-FM changed its call letters to KLPC-FM. Simultaneously, Janecek sold the station pair to D 'n' T Broadcasting Inc., owned by Richard N. Savage, for $1 million. On August 24, 1984, the station switched its call sign to KXCC-FM.

On July 16, 1986, Golden Coast Broadcasting Inc. sold KXCC-FM to Broadcast Management Consultants Inc. for $750,000. The new owner changed the station's call letters to KBOX on November 1.

On May 31, 1988, KBOX was granted a construction permit for a transmitter that would broadcast on the 104.1 MHz frequency with an effective radiated power of 5,700 watts at a height above average terrain of 208 meters (682 ft). At the time of the frequency change the following year, the station aired a soft adult contemporary music format. The station was known as "Lite 104.1".

In 2000, American General Media took control of KBOX upon closing on its purchase from Broadcast Management Consultants. By 2007, the station adopted an adult hits format under the branding "Pirate Radio".

On January 18, 2010 at 11:30 a.m., high winds in the Santa Maria area triggered a power outage that knocked several stations off the air, including KBOX. The station resumed broadcasting one hour later under generator power.
