= KPAT =

Coordinates: 34.742°N 120.447°W

- Orcutt, California; United States
- Broadcast area: Santa Maria, California
- Frequency: 95.7 MHz (HD Radio)
- Branding: 95.7 The Beat

Programming
- Format: Rhythmic contemporary
- Affiliations: Compass Media Networks; Premiere Networks

Ownership
- Owner: American General Media; (AGM California, Inc.)
- Sister stations: KBOX, KRQK, KSMA, KSNI-FM

History
- First air date: 1994 (as KGDP-FM)
- Former call signs: KGDP-FM (1991–1999)

Technical information
- Licensing authority: FCC
- Facility ID: 54755
- Class: B1
- ERP: 3,300 watts
- HAAT: 274 meters (899 ft)

Links
- Public license information: Public file; LMS
- Webcast: Listen Live
- Website: 957thebeatfm.com

KPAT (95.7 FM, "95.7 The Beat") is a commercial radio station that is licensed to Orcutt, California, United States and serves the Santa Maria—Lompoc area. The station is owned by American General Media and broadcasts a rhythmic contemporary format.

== History ==
The station first signed on in 1994 as KGDP-FM with a rhythmic oldies format. By the end of the 1990s, KGDP-FM featured Southern gospel music.

On March 24, 1999, KGDP-FM changed its call sign to KPAT. (Previously, the KPAT call letters belonged to a station in Sioux Falls, South Dakota, now known as KKRC-FM, from 1973 to 1994.) In November, Radio Representatives Inc., based in Los Osos, California, sold KPAT to American General Media for $900,000.

KPAT adopted a rhythmic contemporary format in 2004.

On January 18, 2010, at 11:30 a.m., high winds in the Santa Maria area triggered a power outage that knocked KPAT off the air. The station resumed broadcasting one hour later under generator power.
