= KRQK =

- Lompoc, California; United States
- Broadcast area: Santa Maria—Lompoc, California
- Frequency: 100.3 MHz
- Branding: La Ley 100.3

Programming
- Format: Regional Mexican

Ownership
- Owner: American General Media; (AGM California, Inc.)
- Sister stations: KBOX, KPAT, KSMA, KSNI-FM

History
- First air date: December 18, 1979
- Former frequencies: 100.9 MHz (1979–1990)

Technical information
- Licensing authority: FCC
- Facility ID: 51264
- Class: B1
- ERP: 3,700 watts
- HAAT: 263 meters (863 ft)
- Transmitter coordinates: 34°44′29.9″N 120°26′48.6″W

Links
- Public license information: Public file; LMS
- Webcast: Listen live
- Website: 1003laley.com

KRQK (100.3 FM, "La Ley") is a commercial radio station licensed to Lompoc, California, United States, and serves the Santa Maria—Lompoc area. The station is owned by American General Media and broadcasts a regional Mexican music format.

== History ==
KRQK was signed on December 18, 1979 at the 100.9 FM frequency by Sunshine Wireless of California, broadcasting a top 40 format. In 1985, Sunshine Wireless sold KRQK and its AM sister station KLLB (1410 AM) to Crystal Broadcasting Inc. for $1.75 million.

In January 1989, then-Album-oriented rock formatted KRQK applied to the Federal Communications Commission to change frequencies to 100.3 FM; the request was granted the following year. On December 22, 1989, Crystal Broadcasting sold KRQK and its AM counterpart, then known as KTME, to Nova Broadcasting-Santa Maria, headed by Gregg Peterson, for $1.47 million. The station pair changed hands once again in May 1993, when Nova Broadcasting sold the combo to Padre Serra Communications for $450,000. The new owner then flipped KRQK to a regional Mexican format.

In September 1999, Padre Serra sold KRQK to Bakersfield-based American General Media for $1.3 million.

On January 18, 2010 at 11:30 a.m., high winds in the Santa Maria area triggered a power outage that knocked several stations off the air, including KRQK. The station resumed broadcasting one hour later under generator power.
