= KSLY =

Coordinates: 35.360°N 120.656°W

- San Luis Obispo, California; United States
- Frequency: 96.1 MHz

Programming
- Format: Contemporary Christian
- Network: K-Love

Ownership
- Owner: Educational Media Foundation

History
- First air date: December 1959
- Former call signs: KATY-FM (1959–1973); KUNA (1973–1979); KUNA-FM (1979–1980); KUNA (1980–1984); KSLY-FM (1984–2016)

Technical information
- Licensing authority: FCC
- Facility ID: 58894
- Class: B
- ERP: 4,500 watts
- HAAT: 443 meters (1,453 ft)

Links
- Public license information: Public file; LMS
- Website: klove.com

KSLY (96.1 FM, "K-Love") is a non-commercial radio station that is licensed to San Luis Obispo, California. Owned by Educational Media Foundation, the station carries a contemporary Christian music format from the nationally syndicated K-Love network.

== History ==
=== Early years ===
The station first signed on in December 1959 as KATY-FM, simulcasting then-sister station KATY. It adopted the call sign KUNA in 1973.

In January 1976, KSLY Broadcasting Company sold KUNA and AM counterpart KSLY to a Chicago-based group for $535,000. KUNA, which aired a beautiful music format, changed its call letters to KUNA-FM on January 15, 1979, then back to KUNA the following year.

=== KSLY-FM ===
In February 1984, KUNA switched call signs and formats with KSLY, which aired a top 40 format. The FM station, using new call letters KSLY-FM, adopted the branding "SLY 96-FM".

In September 2000, Mondosphere Broadcasting Inc. sold 11 stations throughout Central California, including KSLY-FM, plus a construction permit for a twelfth station, to Clear Channel Communications for $45 million. KSLY-FM dropped its longtime top 40 format in October 2005, flipping to country music and rebranding as "Cat Country 96.1".

In July 2007, KSLY-FM was one of 16 stations in California and Arizona that Clear Channel sold to El Dorado Broadcasters for $40 million.

On April 20, 2012, KSLY-FM dropped its Cat Country moniker and began simulcasting sister station KSNI-FM in Santa Maria. Both stations co-branded as "Sunny Country 102.5 & 96.1".

In May 2016, upon closing of KSNI-FM's sale to American General Media, KSLY-FM dropped its simulcast of Sunny Country and rebranded as "96.1 SLO Country". This format lasted only two months as the station went silent at the end of June.

On July 15, 2016, El Dorado Broadcasters sold KSLY-FM to Educational Media Foundation for $350,000; the transaction closed in October. EMF then flipped the station to its Christian adult contemporary-formatted K-Love network. KSLY-FM changed its callsign to simply KSLY on December 15, 2016.
