= KKJG =

Coordinates: 35.361°N 120.657°W

- San Luis Obispo, California; United States
- Broadcast area: San Luis Obispo County, California
- Frequency: 98.1 MHz
- Branding: 98.1 K-Jug

Programming
- Format: Country
- Affiliations: Compass Media Networks

Ownership
- Owner: American General Media; (AGM California, Inc.)
- Sister stations: KKAL, KSTT-FM, KVEC, KZOZ

History
- First air date: January 1, 1984
- Former call signs: KKUS (1984–1992)
- Call sign meaning: K K-JuG (used as a musical instrument in early bluegrass bands)

Technical information
- Licensing authority: FCC
- Facility ID: 71713
- Class: B
- ERP: 4,500 watts
- HAAT: 463 meters (1,519 ft)

Links
- Public license information: Public file; LMS
- Webcast: Listen Live
- Website: jugcountry.com

KKJG (98.1 FM, "98.1 K-Jug") is a commercial radio station that is licensed to San Luis Obispo, California and broadcasts to the San Luis Obispo County area. The station is owned by American General Media and airs a country music format. The KKJG studios and offices are located on Sacramento Road in San Luis Obispo and its transmitter is off TV Tower Road in Santa Margarita.

== History ==
The station was first signed on January 1, 1984, as KKUS by Cabrillo Communications Inc.

On May 1, 1992, Cabrillo sold KKUS to Westcoast Broadcasting Inc. for $800,000. The new owner changed the station's call sign to KKJG on June 1 and introduced a country music format branded "K-Jug".

In April 1997, Westcoast sold KKJG to American General Media for $1.5 million.

== Programming ==
Tom and Becky in the Morning, KKJG's morning program, is hosted weekdays by Tom Keffury and Becky Kingman. Keffury is a longtime resident of San Luis Obispo County who arrived at KKJG in October 2005. In the 1990s, Keffury was a morning disc jockey at KDDB. Kingman graduated with a degree in journalism from Cal Poly in 2007 and has lived in San Luis Obispo County since the early 2000s. Preceding the morning show is Farmview Radio, an agricultural news show. Airing Sunday evenings is Country Countdown USA, hosted by Lon Helton.
