= KKAL =

- Paso Robles, California; United States
- Broadcast area: San Luis Obispo, California
- Frequency: 92.5 MHz
- Branding: The Krush 92.5

Programming
- Format: Adult album alternative
- Affiliations: Jones Radio Network

Ownership
- Owner: American General Media; (AGM California)
- Sister stations: KKJG, KSTT-FM, KVEC, KZOZ

History
- First air date: November 20, 1972
- Former call signs: KPRA (1972–1982); KDDB (1982–1999); KWSR (1999–2004)

Technical information
- Licensing authority: FCC
- Facility ID: 64343
- Class: B
- ERP: 4,800 watts
- HAAT: 453 meters (1,486 ft)
- Transmitter coordinates: 35°21′40″N 120°39′21″W

Links
- Public license information: Public file; LMS
- Webcast: Listen live
- Website: krush925.com

KKAL (92.5 FM, "The Krush 92.5") is a commercial radio station that is licensed to Paso Robles, California and serves the San Luis Obispo area. The station is owned by American General Media and broadcasts an adult album alternative (AAA) radio format.

KKAL is notable due to its linkage to the area's wine industry and culture, both in its imaging (e.g. the "Krush" name, as in crushed grapes) and various wine-related programs that air regularly. The studios and offices are on Sacramento Drive in San Luis Obispo and the transmitter is off TV Tower Road in Santa Margarita.

== History ==
=== Early years ===
KKAL first signed on November 20, 1972 as KPRA, the sister station to KPRL (1230 AM), with a country music format. In December 1982, KPRA switched its call sign to KDDB but kept the country format.

In April 1991, Owensville Communications Company sold KDDB to Zindy Broadcasting, headed by Stephen B. Jones, for $350,000.

=== American General Media era (1997–present) ===
In 1997, American General Media purchased KDDB for $675,000. The country format lasted until 2000, when the station became KWSR, a modern adult contemporary outlet known as "Star 92.5". In 2004, the station changed its call letters to KKAL and flipped to classic country, a format that lasted only two years.

In April 2007, KKAL switched formats to hot adult contemporary with the new moniker "The Krush @ 92.5". This branding is inspired by the surrounding Paso Robles wine country, conjuring up images of the vineyards that host wine tasting tours that have grown in popularity.
