= KYNS =

- San Luis Obispo, California; United States
- Broadcast area: San Luis Obispo, California
- Frequency: 1340 kHz
- Branding: The Grade

Programming
- Format: Classic country
- Affiliations: Westwood One

Ownership
- Owner: Martha Fahnoe; (Dimes Media Corporation)
- Sister stations: KPYG, KWWV, KXDZ, KXTZ

History
- First air date: 1948
- Former call signs: KATY (1948–1992); KGLW (1992–2003)
- Call sign meaning: "Your News Station"

Technical information
- Licensing authority: FCC
- Facility ID: 73039
- Class: C
- Power: 790 watts
- Transmitter coordinates: 35°14′2.9″N 120°40′36.6″W
- Translator: See § Translators
- Repeater: 106.1 KWWV-HD3 (San Luis Obispo)

Links
- Public license information: Public file; LMS
- Webcast: Listen live
- Website: thegradecountry.com

KYNS (1340 AM) is a commercial radio station licensed to San Luis Obispo, California, United States, and serves the San Luis Obispo area. The station is owned by Martha Fahnoe, through licensee Dimes Media Corporation, and broadcasts a classic country format featuring hits of the late 1980s to the early 2000s.

== History ==
=== KATY ===
The station first signed on in 1949 as KATY. The station originally was owned by Morden R. Buck and John R. Rider under the name of licensee San Luis Broadcasting Company. In July 1952, San Luis sold KATY to Sweetheart of San Luis Obispo Inc., a group headed by Maynard Marquardt and former WCFL (Chicago) station engineer Glenn Porter for $30,000. Sweetheart held KATY for 14 years, selling the station and its FM counterpart (now KSLY) to Grandy Broadcasting Inc. for $200,000 on October 25, 1966.

In 1973, Grandy divested the AM station to Hill Radio Inc., owned by Duane E. Hill and Velma Faye Tabor, for $275,000. Hill sold KATY just four years later, in June 1977, to Riverside Broadcasting Company for $400,000; former station owner W. John Grandy brokered the deal. The station changed hands yet again in April 1981, when Riverside Broadcasting sold KATY to Coastal Broadcasting for $750,000. That company was owned by Frederick Herdt, Jr., a former disc jockey at KPOP in Roseville, California. However, after Coastal filed for Chapter 7 bankruptcy (liquidation), ownership of KATY reverted to Riverside. On January 3, 1984, Riverside sold the station to Wischnia Communications Corp., majority owned by J. W. Stream, for $300,000; the U.S. Federal Communications Commission (FCC) approved the sale February 17.

=== KGLW ===
In April 1989, Great Electric Communications Corporation attempted to purchase KATY from Wischnia for $160,000; this sale would have brought the hybrid adult contemporary/talk-formatted station under common ownership with KUHL and KXFM in Santa Maria. However, the FCC refused to approve the deal. Ultimately, in 1991, Wischnia sold the station to Rocglo Communications for the lesser sum of $25,000. The new owner changed KATY's call letters to KGLW ("K-Glow") the following year.

=== KYNS ===
Former branding

After Rocglo sold KGLW to Mapleton Communications in 1997, the call sign was changed to KYNS, which stands for "Your News Station". KYNS aired programming provided by Air America, a progressive talk radio network, until the network's demise in January 2010. In January 2013, the station switched to an all-news format and rebranded as "SLO Radio News 1340 AM".

On November 26, 2013, the station dropped its all-news programming and began stunting with an all-Christmas music format as "Christmas 93.7". With the move, public radio station KCLU in Santa Barbara remains the only station on the California's Central Coast with an all-news format. On December 26, the station introduced a soft adult contemporary format with the branding "B93.7".

Mapleton Communications sold KYNS and sister stations KPYG, KWWV, KXDZ, and KXTZ to Martha Fahnoe's Dimes Media Corporation for $1 million; the sale closed on January 15, 2015. On September 26, 2016, KYNS changed their format from soft AC to alternative rock, branded as "Alt 93.7". The soft AC format moved to KWWV-HD2 (106.1 FM) and translator K253BR (98.5) and was rebranded "B98.5". The station was again rebranded "Alt 100.9" in mid 2018 with the addition of translator K265FI (100.9).

On February 28, 2023, KYNS switched to a classic country format as "The Grade." The station continues to carry the syndicated morning program The Bob & Tom Show.

== Translators ==
KYNS is rebroadcast via two FM translator stations as well as on KWWV-HD3, the third HD Radio subchannel of KWWV (106.1) in San Luis Obispo.

Call sign	Frequency	City of license	FID	ERP (W)	Class	FCC info	Notes
K229AK	93.7 FM	Baywood-Los Osos, California	144956	99	D	LMS	Relays KWWV-HD3
K265FI	100.9 FM	Pismo Beach, California	200633	250	D	LMS	Relays KYNS
