= KSTT-FM =

- Atascadero, California; United States
- Broadcast area: San Luis Obispo, California; Santa Maria—Lompoc, California
- Frequency: 104.5 MHz
- Branding: Coast 104.5

Programming
- Format: Adult contemporary
- Affiliations: Premiere Networks

Ownership
- Owner: American General Media; (AGM California, Inc.)
- Sister stations: KKAL, KKJG, KVEC, KZOZ

History
- First air date: 1979
- Former call signs: KIQO (1979–2016)
- Call sign meaning: similar to "Coast"

Technical information
- Licensing authority: FCC
- Facility ID: 42066
- Class: B
- ERP: 4,700 watts
- HAAT: 440 meters (1,440 ft)
- Transmitter coordinates: 35°21′40″N 120°39′21″W

Links
- Public license information: Public file; LMS
- Webcast: Listen live
- Website: coast1045.com

KSTT-FM (104.5 FM, "Coast 104.5") is a commercial radio station licensed to Atascadero, California, United States, and broadcasts to the San Luis Obispo and Santa Maria—Lompoc, California areas. The station is owned by American General Media and airs an adult contemporary format.

== History ==
The station was first signed on in 1979 as KIQO by Midway Broadcasters Inc. The station first aired an adult contemporary music format under the branding "Q104". In July 1984, Gareth F. Garlund and Anna Garlund sold their 80% stake in Midway Broadcasters to partners Gary F. Brill and Virginia Brill, who owned the other 20%, for $700,000.

In July 1998, Midway sold KIQO to Bakersfield, California-based American General Media for $1.5 million. At the time, the station carried an oldies music format.

Logo for KIQO as "Q104.5" until June 2016.

On May 31, 2016, El Dorado Broadcasting sold the intellectual property of KSTT-FM (101.3 FM) in Los Osos-Baywood Park to American General Media as part of a series of divestitures of its Central Coast stations. The deal did not include the 101.3 FM frequency itself, which remained with El Dorado and changed its call sign to KJRW. The transaction was completed July 1, with KIQO dropping its classic hits format branded "Q104.5", picking up the KSTT-FM call letters and that station's adult contemporary format, and rebranding as "Coast 104.5".
