= KSBY =

Television station in San Luis Obispo, California

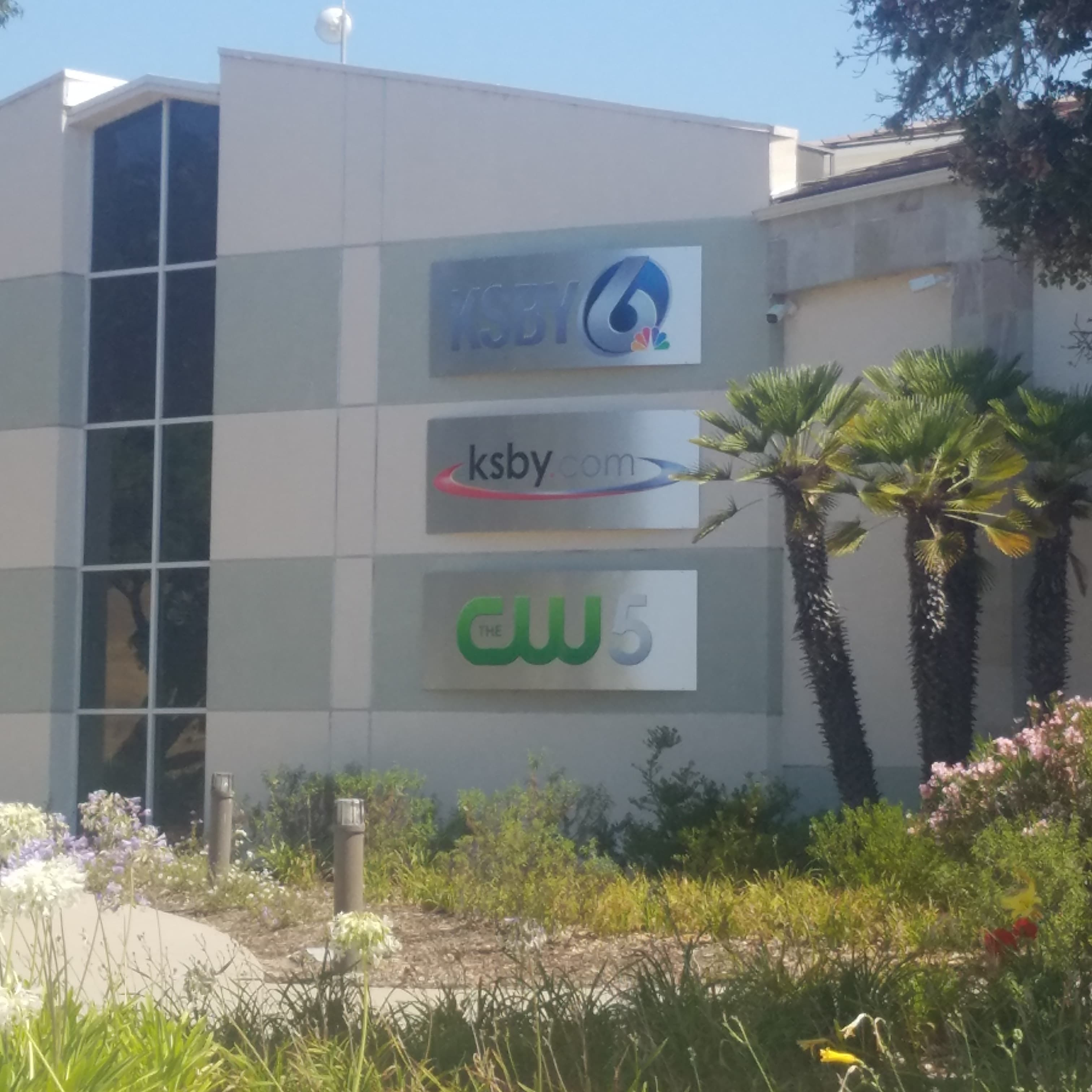
- KSBY's studios on Calle Joaquin in San Luis Obispo
- San Luis Obispo–Santa Maria–; Santa Barbara, California; United States
- City: San Luis Obispo, California
- Channels: Digital: 15 (UHF); Virtual: 6
- Branding: KSBY 6; KSBY News

Programming
- Affiliations: 6.1: NBC; for others, see § Subchannels

Ownership
- Owner: E. W. Scripps Company; (Scripps Broadcasting Holdings LLC)

History
- First air date: May 25, 1953
- Former call signs: KVEC-TV (1953–1957)
- Former channel numbers: Analog: 6 (VHF, 1953–2009)
- Former affiliations: DuMont (1953–1955); ABC (1955–1960); CBS (1955–1969, secondary after 1964)
- Call sign meaning: a disambiguation of former sister station KSBW

Technical information
- Licensing authority: FCC
- Facility ID: 19654
- ERP: 1,000 kW
- HAAT: 515 m (1,690 ft)
- Transmitter coordinates: 35°21′37″N 120°39′22″W
- Translator(s): K19NJ-D Santa Barbara

Links
- Public license information: Public file; LMS
- Website: www.ksby.com

KSBY (channel 6) is a television station licensed to San Luis Obispo, California, United States, serving as the NBC affiliate for the southern Central Coast of California. Owned by the E. W. Scripps Company, the station maintains studio facilities on Calle Joaquin in southern San Luis Obispo, with an additional studio on Carmen Lane in Santa Maria. Its main transmitter is located atop Cuesta Peak; the station also has a translator, K19NJ-D, in Santa Barbara.

Channel 6 was the first station to go on the air in the market; it launched on May 25, 1953, as KVEC-TV, the radio sister station to KVEC. Originally affiliated with the DuMont Television Network, it gained access to additional network programming in 1955. The station became linked to KSBW-TV in Salinas in 1957, changing its call sign to KSBY-TV; they continued to share programming into the 1970s, and the two outlets were co-owned for the next 38 years. In 1969, the station became a primary affiliate of NBC.

After being owned by Elisabeth Murdoch and her husband from 1994 to 1995, the station was acquired by Montecito–based SJL Broadcasting in 1996. SJL moved KSBY from its original studios in a residential area on Hill Street to the present hilltop site on Calle Joaquin; the station also began broadcasting a digital signal under its ownership. Scripps acquired KSBY in 2018 from Cordillera Communications. The station has generally been the news leader in the southern Central Coast market.

== History ==
=== Early years ===
On February 17, 1948, the Valley Electric Company, owner of San Luis Obispo radio station KVEC, applied to the Federal Communications Commission (FCC) for permission to build a new television station on channel 3. However, the application was not acted on by October 1948, when the commission instituted a freeze on new TV station grants to sort out possible changes to television broadcast standards. The freeze was lifted in April 1952; Valley Electric had to modify its application to specify the newly assigned channel 6.

The FCC granted the application on March 11, 1953. Construction proceeded on the station, which was half-built as of August 1952—months ahead of the grant. The original studios were shared with KVEC radio at Mountain View and Hill streets; when the facility was constructed in 1949, space was set aside for a future TV station. KVEC-TV put out its first test pattern on May 13, 1953, and it aired its first regular programming on May 25. This made it the first post-freeze new station in California. The station was originally affiliated with the DuMont Television Network, but in 1955, the station was approved to build a microwave relay to bring in ABC and CBS programs from the networks' stations in Los Angeles. The DuMont network wound down operations later that year.

=== Ownership with KSBW ===
In 1956, John Cohan, the lead stockholder in KSBW radio and television in Salinas, agreed to acquire the KVEC stations for $450,000. KVEC-TV changed its call sign to KSBY-TV on June 14, 1957. The new designation coincided in a major change for channel 6; it was now receiving its programs by microwave from KSBW-TV. While the pairing maintained studios in Salinas and San Luis Obispo, the combination was promoted as the Gold Coast Stations, and they began carrying the same mix of CBS, ABC, and NBC network programming.

The Salinas Valley Broadcasting Corporation, parent company of both stations as well as KSBW radio in Salinas, agreed to be purchased in 1960 by Paul Harron and Gordon Gray, who together owned radio and television properties in upstate New York. The deal never materialized; instead, president and general manager John Cohan and three associates took control of the station in a transaction announced that October. KSBW and KSBY were no longer ABC affiliates by 1962; in the Salinas portion of the market, KNTV in San Jose was carrying the CBS and NBC shows that could not be fit on KSBW–KSBY's schedule, while KEYT in Santa Barbara became a full-time ABC affiliate in September 1963. In 1964, a second station went on the air in Santa Maria: KCOY-TV (channel 12), which in 1965 sought to force KSBY to become an exclusive CBS affiliate so as to protect its NBC affiliation. The opposite would take place four years later: on January 12, 1969, KSBY became a primary NBC affiliate and KCOY-TV a primary CBS affiliate. The ownership consortium, later known as Central California Communications Corporation, also owned the cable systems in Salinas and San Luis Obispo. The FCC ordered Central California Communications Corporation to file for operation of KSBY on a standalone, non-satellite basis in 1975, on account of its financial condition; the order stemmed from a dispute with Gill Industries, owner of KNTV, over the combination of KSBW and KSBY viewership figures for ratings purposes in the Salinas–Monterey market, where the stations' competition—KNTV and KMST in the north and KCOY-TV in the south—did not serve the same area.

KSBW and KSBY were acquired in 1979 by John Blair & Co., a New York firm that represented TV and radio stations to national advertisers. The company owned two radio stations but no TV stations. By this time, KSBY was already dominating its market, leading KCOY and KEYT in evening news ratings even though its signal did not reach Santa Barbara directly. In 1986, Blair fended off a hostile takeover attempt by Macfadden Acquisition Corporation by accepting a competing, higher offer from Reliance Capital Group, led by financier Saul Steinberg.

Reliance, however, did not buy Blair intending to keep its three English-language TV stations: KSBW, KSBY, and KOKH-TV in Oklahoma City; rather, it was interested in the Spanish-language stations in Miami and San Juan, Puerto Rico, which were used to launch the Telemundo network in January 1987. As a result, Blair sold KSBW, KSBY, and KOKH-TV to Gillett Communications for $86 million in November 1986.

Gillett financed its ventures by issuing junk bonds and became burdened by a heavy debt load. The parent company, Gillett Holdings, filed for Chapter 11 bankruptcy reorganization in 1991; the next year, many of its subsidiaries, including KSBY, filed their own bankruptcy cases to protect the station from possible legal issues in the Gillett case. The companies emerged from bankruptcy in October 1992 with ownership having been assumed by Gillett's debtholders. In 1994, KSBW and KSBY went on the market as a package, with Gillett Holdings seeking between $30 and $40 million and receiving multiple offers.

=== EP Communications ownership ===
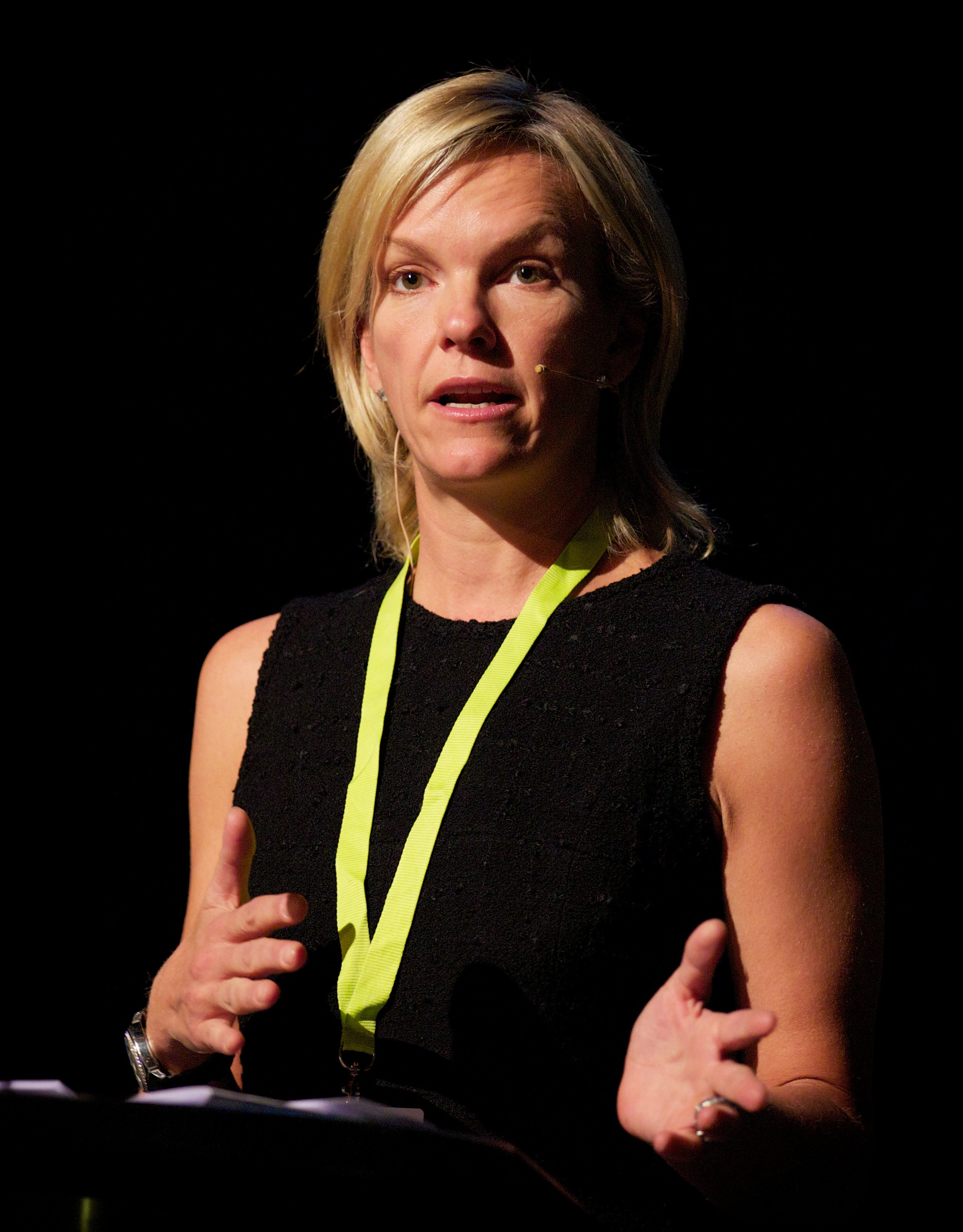
Elisabeth Murdoch (pictured in 2010) owned KSBY from 1994 to 1995.

Gillett announced on March 25, 1994, that KSBY and KSBW would be sold to EP Communications, a new company formed by Elisabeth Murdoch—daughter of media mogul Rupert Murdoch, owner of the Fox network—and her husband, Elkin Pianim. The Los Angeles Times reported a month before the announcement that Rupert Murdoch was interested in giving his daughter and son-in-law hands-on experience running a business. Elisabeth Murdoch had previously worked at Australia's Nine Network and Fox, including a stint as the programming manager of Fox's station in Salt Lake City, Utah, KSTU. There was also speculation that the stations could switch to Fox: at the time, Fox had no affiliate on the southern Central Coast. However, Elisabeth Murdoch was also reported to be taking pains to separate the running of the Central Coast stations from her father's media empire. EP Communications paid $35 million for the pair; the transaction was primarily financed by Commonwealth Bank of Australia, a longtime banker for Rupert Murdoch's media ventures, and was personally guaranteed by Rupert Murdoch.

They brought a big-city mentality to a small-town TV station. And the town didn't care for it.

— Colin Campbell, former KSBY news producer, on Elisabeth Murdoch's style of running the station

The ownership tenure of EP Communications was characterized by multiple changes in management and personnel. The general manager was fired, months after he was promoted; several news department employees departed for positions in other markets or out of TV news, while Elisabeth Murdoch wrote to the San Luis Obispo County Telegram-Tribune, decrying its coverage of changes at her station as "a commercially motivated attempt to embarrass a competitor for advertising dollars". The highest-profile change Murdoch made was to fire Rick Martel, who had been the station's lead news anchor for nearly 15 years. The two—38 years apart in age—clashed, and Martel told Murdoch he was not comfortable working for her; Murdoch stayed at the station until 1 a.m. to personally take or return phone calls from irate viewers. Martel then briefly anchored the news at KCOY-TV between 1995 and 1996.

The situation stabilized after four months, when Murdoch—who had been splitting her time between Salinas and San Luis Obispo—hired a manager to run KSBY and devoted her time to running KSBW. In hindsight, observers noted that Murdoch brought to KSBW and KSBY a larger-market style that was at odds with the stations' prior image, but it was more aggressive and professional with fewer on-air errors. The stations were able to quickly improve their financial positions on account of reduced program costs and a 50-percent increase in network compensation from NBC. In a year when advertising sales were flat, cash flow increased 42 percent.

=== SJL ownership and studio move ===
In September 1995, EP Communications announced the sale of KSBW and KSBY to separate owners. Smith Television—owner of KEYT in Santa Barbara—acquired KSBW, while KSBY was purchased by SJL Broadcasting, which was based in Montecito in Santa Barbara County. Murdoch and Pianim claimed in a statement that consolidation in the TV station industry forced them to either get bigger or sell, though a station employee claimed they were told a good unsolicited offer resulted in the sale. The acquisition and sale of KSBY and KSBW after just 18 months resulted in a net gain of $12.25 million for Murdoch and Pianim.

The key priority of SJL's ownership tenure was to move KSBY out of the Hill Street studios it had occupied for more than 40 years. The location, in a residential area, limited future expansion; as early as 1986, when Gillett purchased channel 6, a relocation was identified as necessary for the station. In 1996, SJL purchased a hilltop property at the end of Calle Joaquin that had housed a parade of nightclubs since 1975 but had sat vacant for more than two years. Construction began in 1998, and the station relocated in 1999. The Calle Joaquin site, at 17,000 square feet (1,600 m^{2}), was twice as large as the former quarters at 8,000 square feet (740 m^{2}).

KSBY expanded by launching the cable-only The WB 100+ Station Group virtual station "KWCA" in April 2002; the service replaced Los Angeles' KTLA on local cable. In September 2002, SJL sold KSBY to the second incarnation of New Vision Television. Jason Elkins, founder of New Vision, had previously owned and sold a group of stations under that name in the 1990s; KSBY and KVII-TV in Amarillo, Texas, were the second incarnation's first acquisitions. They believed there was still money to be made in small-market TV, particularly because viewer loyalty to network affiliates was higher in smaller markets.

=== Recent history ===
Evening Post Industries (through its Cordillera Communications subsidiary) acquired the station in 2004 for $67.75 million. The station closed its Santa Barbara news bureau in January 2008, focusing its energies on news coverage in the San Luis Obispo and Santa Maria areas; however, it continued the practice of offering separate weather segments for all three areas.

Cordillera announced on October 29, 2018, that it would sell most of its stations, including KSBY, to the E. W. Scripps Company. The sale was completed on May 1, 2019.

On April 19, 2024, Nexstar Media Group, majority owner of The CW, announced that the network would not renew its affiliations with Scripps-owned stations, including KSBY. On July 31, the News-Press & Gazette Company announced that it had reached a deal with the network in which it would affiliate with Telemundo station KCOY.

== Technical information ==
=== Subchannels ===
KSBY's transmitter is located atop Cuesta Peak. The station's signal is multiplexed:

Subchannels of KSBY
| Subchannel | Res. | Short name | Programming |
|---|---|---|---|
| 6.1 | 1080i | KSBY-HD | NBC |
| 6.2 | 720p | Laff | Laff |
| 6.3 | 480i | Grit | Grit |
| 6.4 | 480i | CourtTV | Court TV |
| 6.5 | 480i | Mystery | Busted |
| 6.6 | 480i | ION | Ion |

=== Analog-to-digital conversion ===
KSBY began broadcasting a digital signal on July 2, 2002. shut down its analog signal, over VHF channel 6, on February 17, 2009, the original target date on which full-power television stations in the United States were to transition from analog to digital broadcasts under a federal mandate. The station's digital signal remained on its pre-transition UHF channel 15, using virtual channel 6.
