= Hildward Croes =

Hildward Leonil Croes (September 7, 1962 – December 17, 2014) was an Aruban musician, composer, arranger and three-time Grammy Award nominee. He had one son, Angelo Kock, and two daughters, Hilyann Croes and Natusha Croes. He also had a grandchild named Kayden Kock.

Croes was born on the Caribbean island of Aruba (at the time part of the Netherlands Antilles) and began performing at a young age as a keyboardist with different bands. With Cryptus Confession he recorded an album of original compositions in 1979 which included the number one song "Love Dream".

== Education ==
Croes moved to the United States in the early 1980s to study music at Berklee College of Music in Boston. After obtaining his bachelor's degree, he continued his graduate studies at Bowling Green State University in Ohio where he obtained his Master of Music degree in 1988.

== Musical Achievements ==
In 1989 he was contracted by Wilfrido Vargas with whom he toured the world and earned a Grammy nomination for his contribution as co-producer on the album Animación. In the late 1990s he joined Juan Luis Guerra & 440 as a keyboardist and programmer and performed concerts throughout North, Central, South America, as well as the Caribbean and parts of Europe. He then went on to join Chichi Peralta & Son Familia in 1997 and won a Latin Grammy for best Merengue album in 2001 with ...De Vuelta Al Barrio. In 2006, he earned a Latin Grammy nomination for best Merengue album with Mas Que Suficiente on which he made musical arrangements and played the accordion, piano, and keyboards. He won numerous awards and prizes in his native Aruba and owned a production company and recording studio.
