= Jim Vanderzwaan =

Dutch-American television meteorologist (born 1950)

- Born: Jacobus Wilhelmus van der Zwaan; May 1, 1950 (age 74); Savaneta, Netherlands Antilles
- Occupation: Retired

Jim Willem Vanderzwaan (born May 1, 1950) is a Dutch-American television meteorologist who worked in Salinas, California. He holds the National Weather Association's seal of approval. His ability at weather forecasting has earned him awards from both the Associated Press and the Radio-Television News Directors Association.

== History ==
Vanderzwaan was born in Aruba; he moved to the United States at 5 years of age and became a U.S. citizen in 1972. His career in broadcasting began in 1974 in Reno, Nevada. Pursuing an airman certificate in 1978 sparked his interest in meteorology and his career turned to broadcast meteorology two years later. Before permanently settling in his residence in the Salinas Valley in 1983 he worked at stations in Boise, Idaho and Medford, Oregon.

== Personal life ==
With his strong interest in aviation, Jim has been a frequent announcer at two of central California's airshows. Both the Santa Cruz County airshow as well as the larger California International Airshow in Salinas have had Jim perform as crowd entertainer and educator. He's appeared at the airshow in Salinas since 1983 as announcer and has performed as director of flight operations as well.
