= American General Media =

American radio broadcasting company

- Company type: Privately held
- Founded: 1983
- Headquarters: Bakersfield, California
- Key people: Anthony Brandon, Chairman; Margaret Nuanez, Chief Financial Officer; Rogers Brandon, President
- Products: Radio
- Website: www.americangeneralmedia.com/about/our-team

American General Media is a media company specializing in radio. It was founded by Lawrence Brandon and is operated by sons Anthony and Rogers. American General Media is headquartered in Bakersfield, California.

Lawrence Brandon owned and operated over 75 radio stations during his tenure; today the company operates stations throughout the Southwest.

== Markets and stations ==
=== Albuquerque/Santa Fe ===
- KABG: Big 98.5 (Classic Hits)
- KHFM: Classical 99.5 KHFM (Classical Music)
- KIOT: Coyote 102.5 (Classic Rock)
- KJFA-FM: Fuego 102.9 (Hispanic Rhythmic)
- KKRG: Mix 105.1 (Hot AC)
- KKSS: KISS 97.3 (Rhythmic Contemporary)
- KLVO: Radio Lobo 97.7 (Regional Mexican)

=== Bakersfield, California ===
- KEBT: La Caliente 96.9 (Regional Mexican)
- KERN: KERN Newstalk 96.1FM & 1180AM (Talk/News)
- KISV: Hot 94.1 (Rhythmic Top-40)
- KGEO: Sports Talk KGEO 101.1FM & 1230AM (Sports)
- KGFM: 101.5 BIG FM (Adult Hits)
- KKXX: Hits 93.1 (Top-40)

=== San Luis Obispo ===
- KKAL: The Krush 92.5 (Adult Album Alternative)
- KKJG: 98.1 K-Jug (Country)
- KSTT: Coast 104.5 (Adult Contemporary)
- KVEC: KVEC Newstalk 920AM & 96.5FM (Talk)
- KZOZ: 93.3 KZOZ (Rock)

=== Santa Maria ===
- KBOX: Pirate Radio 104.1 (Adult Hits)
- KPAT: 95.7 The Beat (Rhythmic Contemporary)
- KRQK: La Ley 100.3 (Regional Mexican)
- KSMA: KSMA Newstalk 1240AM & 99.5FM (Talk)
- KSNI: Sunny Country 102.5 (Country)

== Fines ==
In April 1999, American General Media, licensee of Station KISV(FM), Bakersfield, CA received a Notice of Apparent Liability from the Federal Communications Commission "for a Forfeiture pursuant to Section 503(b) of the Communications Act of 1934."

American General was fined $4,000 for the willful violation of Section 73.1206 of the Federal Communications Commission's rules - the unauthorized broadcast of a telephone conversation.

A second notice and fine of $3,000 was sent to American General in September 1999 for Station KISV(FM) repeated violations of Section 73.1206.
