= KRGS =

- Rifle, Colorado; United States
- Broadcast area: Grand Junction, Colorado
- Frequency: 690 kHz

Ownership
- Owner: Western Slope Communications, LLC
- Sister stations: KAYW, KAVP, KWGL, KZKS

History
- First air date: June 9, 1967
- Last air date: July 2022
- Former call signs: KWSR (1967–1985); KDBL (1985–1987); KWWS (1987–1989); KKGD (1989–1994)
- Former frequencies: 810 kHz (1967–1995)

Technical information
- Facility ID: 71960
- Class: D
- Power: 900 watts (day); 12 watts (night)
- Transmitter coordinates: 39°32′56″N 107°46′11″W
- Translator: 98.9 K255CB (Rifle)

KRGS (690 AM) was a radio station licensed to Rifle, Colorado, United States. The station was owned by Western Slope Communications, LLC. It went on the air in 1967 as KWSR; after nearly losing its license in the 1970s, it became KDBL in 1985, KWWS in 1987, KKGD in 1989, and KRGS in 1994, before ceasing operations in 2022.

== History ==
On July 6, 1965, the Oil Shale Broadcasting Company applied to the Federal Communications Commission (FCC) for permission to build a new 1,000-watt, daytime-only radio station on 810 kHz in Rifle. The commission granted the permit on December 2, 1966, and the station began broadcasting in 1967. The manager was Jimmy Seany, a former promotions manager for Denver's KWGN-TV; studios were in the Winchester Hotel.

The FCC designated the renewal of KWSR's broadcast license for hearing in November 1974 on the basis of complaints made by a former employee. In January 1976, FCC administrative law judge Walter C. Miller issued an initial decision to deny the renewal. The major issue in the license renewal proceeding was that the station rigged a "Turkey Shoot" contest. He preselected winners, one of them an advertiser on KWSR, so as to avoid an imbalance in geography; the rigging was carried out by a young staffer, according to owner Norm Price. Miller also cited other misrepresentations in the station's operating logs and said that although unfortunate, the station's misdeeds merited a temporary loss of radio service in Rifle. Upset listeners in the Rifle area and nearby Grand Junction mounted a letter-writing campaign to the commission in protest of Miller's initial decision. Oil Shale Broadcasting Company appealed, and the full FCC granted a one-year license renewal and assessed a $200 fine.

KWSR was sold to Susan and Stephen Hughes in 1985. Hughes owned Rifle FM station KDBL, and the stations became KDBL and KDBL-FM. This was the first in a series of sales over the next decade. Servant Communications, a group with broadcast interests in Oklahoma, acquired the KDBL stations in 1987 and changed the call letters on AM to KWWS. Within a year, Servant sold the pair to companies owned by Steven Humphries; by this time, KWWS was airing a country music format. In 1988, Humphries was involved in a dispute with the then owners of KKOB and KKOB-FM in Albuquerque. The owner of those stations, Fairmont Communications corporation, disputed Humphries' acquisition of KNMQ out of Santa Fe. At the time, Humphries also owned 100% of the share of Sun Media of Colorado. Sun Media was operating KWWS at the time. Sister station KZKS, then known as KWWS-FM, was involved in the dispute as well. Its call sign changed to KKGD in 1989, ahead of a format change to oldies. The stations were sold again in 1991 for assumption of debts; the new owners, David Smith's Western Media, sold them to Canterbury Broadcasting for $20,000 in 1993. Canterbury, in turn, sold KKGD and KZKS to Western Slope Communications for $30,000 in 1994.

The call sign was changed to KRGS on April 21, 1994. The station, which had been silent, returned to the air that September carrying country music from Jones Satellite Networks. KRGS moved from 810 to 690 kHz in 1995, and switched to oldies, also provided by Jones, in September 1997.

The FCC cancelled the station’s license on July 24, 2024, as it had been off the air since July 2022 and did not respond to an FCC letter. KRGS had left the air due to a transmitter failure; by then, it had become a sports radio station affiliated with ESPN Radio.
