= KZKS =

Coordinates: 39.432°N 108.130°W

- Rifle, Colorado; United States
- Broadcast area: Grand Junction, Colorado; Glenwood Springs, Colorado
- Frequency: 105.3 MHz
- Branding: Drive 105

Programming
- Format: Classic rock

Ownership
- Owner: Western Slope Communications
- Sister stations: KAYW, KAVP, KWGL

History
- First air date: 1983
- Former call signs: KDBL (1983–1985); KDBL-FM (1985–1987); KWWS-FM (1987–1988)

Technical information
- Licensing authority: FCC
- Facility ID: 71959
- Class: C
- ERP: 60,000 watts
- HAAT: 743 meters (2,438 ft)
- Translators: 97.5 K248AE (Montrose); 98.1 K251BG (Redlands); 103.7 K279DE (Steamboat Springs)
- Repeaters: 105.3 KZKS-FM1 (Grand Junction); 105.3 KZKS-FM2 (Carbondale); 105.3 KZKS-FM3 (Glenwood Springs)

Links
- Public license information: Public file; LMS
- Website: www.wscradio.net/general-8

KZKS (105.3 FM) is a radio station which broadcasts a classic rock format. Licensed to Rifle, Colorado, United States, it serves the Grand Junction area. The station is owned by Western Slope Communications. KZKS operates boosters to fill in its signal in Grand Junction, Glenwood Springs, and Carbondale.

== History ==
In 1988, the owner of KZKS, Steven Humphries, was involved in a dispute with the then owners of KKOB and KKOB-FM in Albuquerque. The owner of those stations, Fairmont Communications Corporation, disputed Humphries' acquisition of KNMQ out of Santa Fe. At the time, Humphries also owned 100% of the share of Sun Media of Colorado. Sun Media was operating KZKS at the time. Sister station KRGS, then known as KWWS, was involved in the dispute as well.

KZKS at one time carried country as its format, and was known as "Kiss Country".
