= Michael Roberts =

Michael or Mike Roberts may refer to:

== Arts and literature ==
- Michael Roberts (writer) (1902–1948), British poet, writer, critic and broadcaster
- Michael D. Roberts (born 1947), American actor
- Michael Roberts (fashion journalist) (1947–2023), British journalist
- Michael Symmons Roberts (born 1963), British writer
- Mike Roberts (mixer) (born 1992), American mixing engineer

== Sports ==
=== Rugby ===
- Mike Roberts (rugby union, born 1946), Wales international rugby union player
- Mick Roberts (born 1979), rugby league player for the Brisbane Broncos
- Mike Roberts (rugby union, born 1982), rugby union wing for Connacht Rugby

=== Other sports ===
- Mike Roberts (sportscaster) (1933–2016), sportscaster of KKOB-AM in Albuquerque
- Mike Roberts (baseball) (born 1950), American baseball player and coach
- Michael Roberts (jockey) (born 1954), South African jockey
- Michael Roberts (footballer) (born 1959), Australian rules footballer and TV journalist
- Michael Roberts (tennis), American tennis player
- Michael Roberts (cricketer) (born 1989), English cricketer
- Michael Roberts (American football) (born 1994), American football player

== Other ==
- Michael Roberts (college principal) (died 1679), principal of Jesus College, Oxford, 1648–1657
- Michael Roberts (mathematician) (1817–1882), Irish mathematician
- Michael Roberts (historian) (1908–1996), British historian
- Michael Roberts (politician) (1927–1983), British Conservative Party politician, Cardiff MP 1970–1983
- R. Michael Roberts (born 1940), American biologist
- Michael Roberts (priest) (born 1943), British Church of England priest and academic
- Michael John Roberts (1977–2026), Canadian television director, producer, and animator
- Michael W. Roberts, American defense acquisition official

== See also ==
- Mike Roberts (disambiguation)
