= KOAT-TV =

Television station in Albuquerque, New Mexico

- Albuquerque–Santa Fe, New Mexico; United States
- City: Albuquerque, New Mexico
- Channels: Digital: 7 (VHF); Virtual: 7
- Branding: KOAT 7 CBS New Mexico (7.4); KOAT Action 7 News (call letters are pronounced individually)

Programming
- Affiliations: 7.1: ABC; 7.4: CBS; for others, see § Subchannels

Ownership
- Owner: Hearst Television; (Hearst Properties Inc.)

History
- First air date: October 2, 1953
- Former channel numbers: Analog: 7 (VHF, 1953–2009); Digital: 21 (UHF, 2002–2009)
- Former affiliations: DuMont (secondary, 1954–1955)
- Call sign meaning: from former radio sister KOAT (AM)

Technical information
- Licensing authority: FCC
- Facility ID: 53928
- ERP: 26.5 kW
- HAAT: 1,292 m (4,239 ft)
- Transmitter coordinates: 35°12′53″N 106°27′3″W
- Translator(s): see § Translators

Links
- Public license information: Public file; LMS
- Website: www.koat.com

KOAT-TV (channel 7) is a television station in Albuquerque, New Mexico, United States, affiliated with ABC and CBS. Owned by Hearst Television, the station maintains studios on Carlisle Boulevard in Northeast Albuquerque, and its transmitter is located on Sandia Crest, northeast of Albuquerque. Twenty-seven repeaters carry its broadcast signal to much of New Mexico as well as southwestern Colorado and northeastern Arizona.

KOAT-TV was the second station to broadcast in Albuquerque, signing on in October 1953 as one of two new TV stations in the city in the same month. It suffered financial difficulty twice in its first four years of operation, though ownership by Clinton D. McKinnon and the Steinman Stations group steadied operations. KOAT-TV's newscasts have generally led the Albuquerque–Santa Fe market in viewership since the mid-1970s. The station's fourth subchannel assumed the CBS affiliation for New Mexico on August 1, 2026.

== History ==
=== Early years ===
After the Federal Communications Commission (FCC) lifted its four-year freeze on television station licenses in 1952, channels 7 and 13 were authorized for commercial use in Albuquerque in addition to the existing KOB-TV (channel 4). Among the various interests whose applications had languished at the FCC prior to the freeze was the Alvarado Broadcasting Company, owner of radio station KOAT (1450 AM). The original application had specified channel 13, but Alvarado switched its application to specify channel 7. This took the company out of competition with KGGM, which had also filed for channel 13. Another application had been filed for channel 7, by E. John and Salome Greer of Santa Fe, but by February 1953, E. John Greer had died. The Greer interests withdrew on June 16, 1953, leaving Alvarado unopposed. Two days later, on June 18, the FCC granted Alvarado a construction permit for KOAT-TV.

Work began within two weeks to enlarge the KOAT radio studios at 122 Tulane SE to accommodate the television extension, including adding a kitchen studio, and on a transmitter site on Ten Mile Hill, west of Albuquerque. KOAT-TV also arranged to match its sister radio station by affiliating with the ABC television network. Meanwhile, a minority stake in KOAT-TV was sold to two new investors.

KOAT-TV was scheduled to start on September 15, but the launch date was missed when factory inspectors and a critical piece of equipment failed to arrive on time. KOAT-TV beat KGGM-TV (channel 13, now KRQE) in being the first of the new stations to air when it began broadcasting on October 2, 1953; channel 13 followed two days later. KOAT-TV was the Albuquerque-area affiliate of the DuMont Television Network from 1954 until the network's dissolution the next year, replacing KOB-TV.

Alvarado sold its two radio stations—KOAT and KRSN in Los Alamos—in October 1954. Financial difficulty was evinced by the fact that KOAT had cut all but one live local show from its schedule. Six months later, in April 1955, KOAT-TV filed for bankruptcy reorganization in a plan that brought in 20 new stockholders and saw Albuquerque Exhibitors, a movie theater owner that had bought a stake in the station prior to launch, become the largest stockholder in the venture. Even while in bankruptcy, the station applied to the FCC to relocate its transmitter to Sandia Crest, a peak which already was the home of KOB-TV and KGGM-TV. The FCC granted approval in May 1956, allowing construction of a tower at the site.

=== McKinnon and Steinman ownership ===
The reorganization in 1955 was ultimately unsuccessful at repairing KOAT-TV's financial condition. Just as the Internal Revenue Service filed a tax lien on KOAT-TV, Clinton D. McKinnon, a former U.S. congressman from California and owner of KVOA radio and KVOA-TV in Tucson, Arizona, came to the station's rescue in January 1957 by buying it for $12,500 plus the assumption of debts. At the time, KOAT's liabilities exceeded its assets by some $150,000. The FCC approved the sale the next month. McKinnon merged the holding companies for KVOA-TV and KOAT-TV in 1959, under a contract that called for McKinnon to resign if Alvarado Television lost money in six consecutive months.

KOAT-TV unsuccessfully suggested that channel 2 in Santa Fe be jointly assigned to both cities or to Albuquerque so it could move there. KOAT had desired channel 2 to improve its coverage in fringe areas from Albuquerque, and McKinnon had previously protested an attempt by a proposed Santa Fe station to locate its transmitter on Sandia Crest.

In 1962, KOAT-TV constructed a microwave relay system from Albuquerque to Phoenix in order to connect with ABC, said to be the longest such system in private ownership in the United States, and it began work on new facilities on University Boulevard on Albuquerque's northeast side which were twice the size of the original facilities on Tulane. However, while construction was ongoing, several of the partners in Alvarado, in ill health and wishing to liquidate their holdings, pushed McKinnon to sell Alvarado Television. KVOA-TV and KOAT-TV were sold in August 1962 to Steinman Stations of Lancaster, Pennsylvania, headed by Clair McCollough, for $3.5 million, with FCC approval coming in January 1963.

=== Pulitzer and Hearst ownership ===
Steinman owned the Albuquerque station for five years before selling it in 1968 to the Pulitzer Publishing Company, publishers of the St. Louis Post-Dispatch and owners of KSD radio and KSD-TV in that city, for $5 million; the FCC granted approval for the transaction in 1969. Steinman had previously sold to Pulitzer KVOA-TV in Tucson earlier in the year.

Pulitzer invested in new facilities for the station to facilitate expansion. In 1978, it sold its existing studios on University to Albuquerque radio stations KRZY and KRST and announced it would construct a larger facility at the intersection of Carlisle Boulevard and Comanche Road, more than twice the size of the University building and with more convenient freeway access and a larger parking area. The resulting structure, designed by Albuquerque architect Antoine Predock, began construction in 1979 and was completed in July 1980. It also features an on-site helipad, enabling the station to keep a news helicopter at its studios instead of at the airport. Pulitzer received several unsolicited offers but categorically refused to sell KOAT-TV because of its strong performance: company executive Ray Karpowicz noted, "Under no circumstances would we even consider selling it."

In 1991, KOAT opened a news bureau in Roswell with the capability to add regional news, weather, and advertising inserts into the feed of KOAT seen on cable systems and translators in southeastern New Mexico. Hearst-Argyle acquired the entirety of Pulitzer's broadcasting holdings in 1998.

In 2025, KOAT announced an agreement with the Albuquerque Isotopes of Minor League Baseball to broadcast 12 games. Games would be split between KOAT and KOAT's third subchannel (True Crime Network).

KOAT-TV's fourth subchannel assumed the CBS affiliation for Albuquerque from KRQE on August 1, 2026. KOAT-TV was one of four Hearst-owned stations receiving CBS from Nexstar Media Group–owned stations in their markets.

== News operation ==
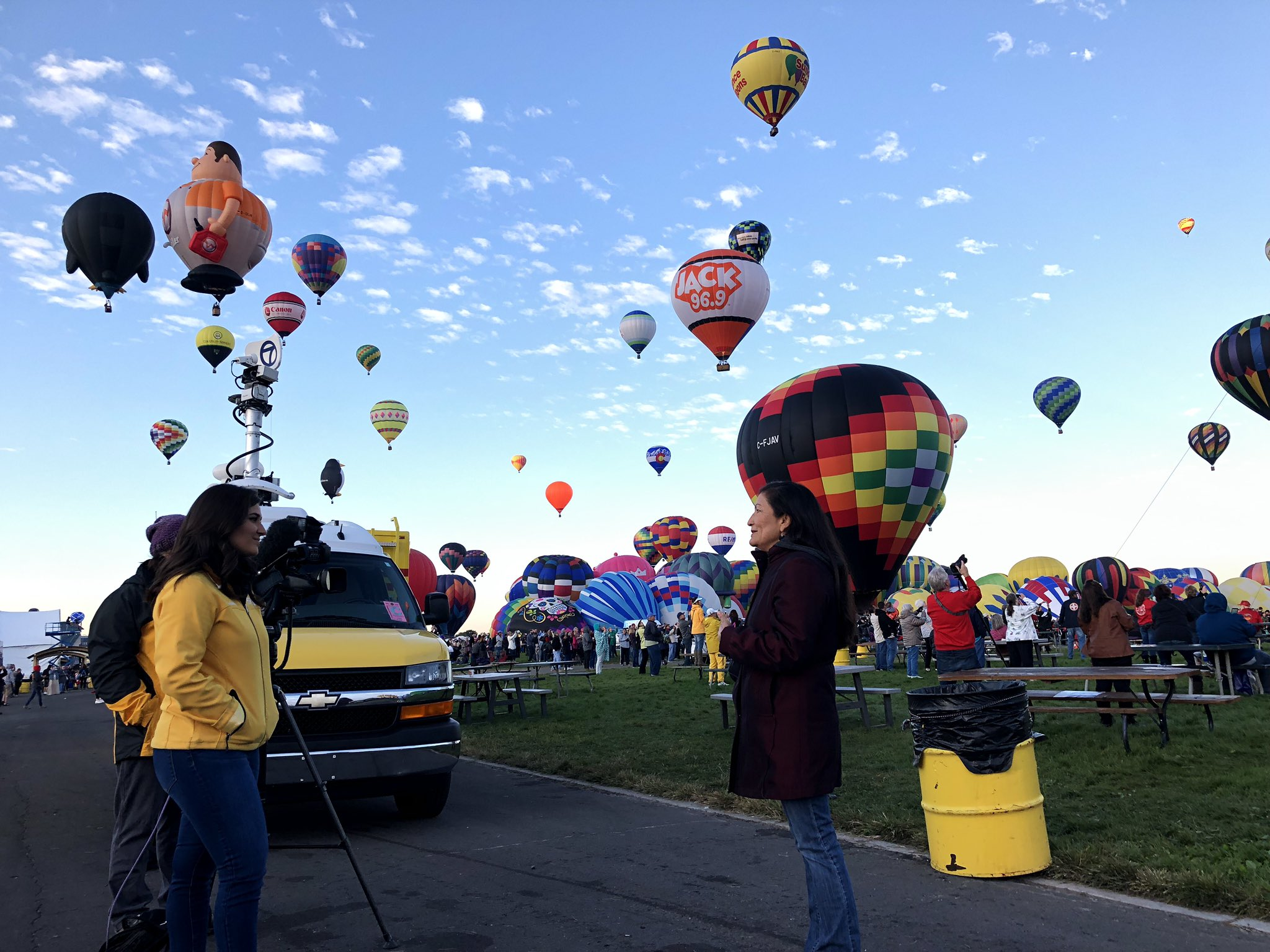
KOAT-TV reporter interviewing Deb Haaland at the 2019 Albuquerque International Balloon Fiesta.

After back-and-forth competition between KOB-TV and KOAT-TV in the late 1960s and early 1970s, 1976 proved to be a watershed year for the station's news ratings. That year, KOAT took a definitive lead as having the most-watched newscasts in the region, having erased a 14-point rating lead that KOB-TV had held in 1971. The station boasted high stability in news anchor talent during this time, with news anchor Dick Knipfing—who had been with KOAT since 1964—and weather forecaster Howard Morgan, who worked at the station from 1971 to 1999. In 1979, KOB-TV lured away Knipfing, leading to a lawsuit seeking to get him out of a non-compete clause in his contract with KOAT. KOAT then moved to fire Knipfing, who contended the non-compete clause expired with his contract on July 31, 1979, instead of remaining in effect for one year. Knipfing won the case and started on time at KOB. KOAT managed to remain in first place despite losing its star anchorman, though the gap was narrowed between the top two stations. The move never had the intended goal of displacing KOAT from its number-one position, and KOB ousted Knipfing in 1986; in an interview with The Albuquerque Tribune, Knipfing cited the talent stability and quality at KOAT for keeping that station in the lead. Knipfing then joined KGGM-TV's news team in 1987 before returning to KOAT two years later.

Knipfing's first posting upon his return was anchoring a new 5 p.m. newscast, the station's third attempt at an earlier evening news program, which debuted in March 1990. In 1994, KOAT debuted its morning newscast, Good Morning New Mexico (later rebranded as Action 7 News Live This Morning and now Action 7 News More in the Morning). However, KOB and KRQE each improved their news products during the 1990s, allowing them to close the gap on KOAT.

After the Hearst purchase, the station saw the retirements of Morgan and Johnny Morris (after a 21-year run with KOAT), as well as Knipfing's second departure in 2000.

KOAT has generally remained the market news leader since; by 2022, it led or was competitive in every major daypart. Since September 20, 2021, KOAT has streamed its newscasts, as well as other locally produced content, on Very Local, an over-the-top media service operated by Hearst Television.

=== Notable former staff ===
- Mike Roberts – weekend sportscaster, 1976–1982
- Terry McDermott — sports director, 1985–1997

== Technical information ==
=== Subchannels ===
KOAT-TV's transmitter is located on Sandia Crest, northeast of Albuquerque. The station's signal is multiplexed:

Subchannels of KOAT-TV
Subchannel	Res.	Short name	Programming
7.1	1080i	KOAT-DT	ABC
7.2	480i	Estrell	Estrella TV
7.3	480i	TCN	True Crime Network
7.4	720p	KOATCBS	CBS
7.5	480i	Story	Story Television
7.6	480i	QVC	QVC (4:3)
50.5	480i	Antenna	Antenna TV (KASY-TV) (4:3)

Broadcast on behalf of another station

=== Analog-to-digital conversion ===
KOAT-TV shut down its analog signal, over VHF channel 7, on June 12, 2009, the official date on which full-power television stations in the United States transitioned from analog to digital broadcasts under federal mandate. The station's digital signal relocated from its pre-transition UHF channel 21 to VHF channel 7.

=== Translators ===
KOAT-TV is rebroadcast on 27 additional translators, most owned by the station, across much of New Mexico, southwestern Colorado, and northeastern Arizona.

- Alamogordo, etc.: K34CR-D
- Caballo: K16LU-D
- Carlsbad: K18NX-D
- Colfax: K23JD-D
- Crownpoint: K30KV-D
- Deming: K22ME-D
- Dulce, Lumberton: K28ER-D
- Farmington: K19CM-D
- Farmington (Huérfano Mountain): K24IV-D
- Gallup: K10PW-D
- Grants, etc.: K11EV-D
- Hobbs: K12NH-D
- Las Vegas: K09AI-D
- Montoya, Newkirk: K28NX-D
- Mount Powell: K15KK-D
- Raton: K16CH-D
- Red River: K12OC-D
- Roswell: K13RK-D
- Ruidoso: K31MW-D
- Silver City: K08QP-D
- Taos: K36LF-D
- Tierra Amarilla: K36KD-D
- Cortez, CO: K09DM-D
- Durango, CO: K24NH-D
- Romeo, CO: K17JW-D
- Vallecito, CO: K13PJ-D
- Many Farms, AZ: K36JX-D

== Former satellite stations ==
KOAT-TV formerly operated three satellite stations, which rebroadcast its signal and added local content for other parts of the broadcast market:

Former satellite stations of KOAT-TV
Station	City of license	Digital channel	Virtual channel	First air date	Last air date	Former call signs	ERP	HAAT	Facility ID	Transmitter coordinates
KOCT	Carlsbad	19 (UHF)	6	Aug 24, 1956	Jul 18, 2012	KAVE-TV (1956–1987); KVIO-TV (1987–1993)	15 kW	333 m (1,093 ft)	53908	32°47′38″N 104°12′29″W
KOFT	Farmington	8 (VHF)	3	2002	Nov 13, 2007		40 kW	165.9 m (544 ft)	53904	36°40′17″N 108°13′52.7″W
KOVT	Silver City	10 (VHF)	10	Sep 1987 (Note: The Broadcasting and Cable Yearbook says KOVT signed on September 9, while the Television and Cable Factbook says it signed on September 10.)	Jul 18, 2012	KWNM-TV (1987–1992)	3.2 kW	485 m (1,591 ft)	53911	32°51′46″N 108°14′28″W

In 1993, KOAT purchased the then-KVIO-TV (channel 6) from Marsh Media, owner of KVIA-TV in El Paso, Texas. The station had operated as a satellite of an ABC station since 1966 and of the El Paso station since 1969. The move expanded the reach of KOAT-TV and made it the only ABC affiliate serving southeastern New Mexico.

Hearst-Argyle surrendered the license of KOFT to the FCC effective November 13, 2007, though its license was not canceled until May 6, 2010. Hearst then informed the FCC on July 18, 2012, that it would discontinue the operations of KOCT and KOVT; their licenses were canceled on August 1. The move was made to eliminate the need to maintain the KOCT and KOVT public files in their respective cities due to FCC regulations which went into effect on that date; they were replaced on those channels with translator station licenses (in Silver City, at reduced power).
