= KKOB =

KKOB may refer to:

- KKOB (AM), a radio station (770 AM) licensed to serve Albuquerque, New Mexico, United States
- KKOB-FM, a radio station (96.3 FM) licensed to serve Albuquerque, New Mexico
- KOBQ, a radio station (93.3 FM) licensed to serve Albuquerque, New Mexico, which held the call sign KKOB-FM from 1986 to 2019
