= Mike Roberts =

Mike Roberts may refer to:

- Mike Roberts (baseball) (born 1950), American baseball player and coach
- Mike Roberts (rugby union, born 1982), rugby union wing for Connacht Rugby
- Mike Roberts (mixer) (born 1992), American mixing engineer from Syracuse, New York
- Mike Roberts (sportscaster) (1933–2016), sportscaster of KKOB-AM in Albuquerque
- Mike Roberts (rugby union, born 1946), Wales international rugby union player

== See also ==
- Michael Roberts (disambiguation)
