= SVA =

SVA is an initialism that may refer to:

== Military ==
- South Vietnamese army, unofficial colloquial name for the Army of the Republic of Vietnam (ARVN)
- Student Veterans of America, an education non-profit organization that serves student veterans
- Scottish Veterans Association

== Science ==
- Special visceral afferent, afferent nerves that develop in association with the gastrointestinal tract
- SequenceVariantAnalyzer, a computer program for annotating and analyzing genetic variants
- SINE-VNTR-Alu, a composite, hominid-specific retrotransposon
- SVA, the Specific Area Message Encoding (SAME) code for a Severe thunderstorm watch

== Schools ==
- Sandia View Academy, in Corrales, New Mexico, USA
- School of Visual Arts, in Manhattan, New York City, USA
- Shenandoah Valley Academy, in New Market, Virginia, USA

== Sport ==
- Scottish Volleyball Association, the national governing body for volleyball in Scotland

== Other ==
- Student Volunteer Army, a volunteer organisation based at the University of Canterbury, New Zealand.
- ICAO designator for Saudi Arabian Airlines, a Saudi airline
- SVA, the IATA code for Savoonga Airport
- Servicio de Vigilancia Aduanera (Customs Surveillance Service), a Spanish law enforcement agency
- Shareholder value added, a financial concept for the estimation of shareholder value
- Single vehicle approval, performed by the Vehicle Certification Agency (VCA) to render a vehicle "street-legal" in the United Kingdom
- Società Valdostana Automobili, a defunct Italian racing car manufacturer
- National Veterinary Institute (Sweden) (Statens veterinärmedicinska anstalt)
- Subject-verb agreement (in grammar)
- Super Vertical Alignment, a type of Vertical Alignment (VA) panel that claims better viewing angles.
- Svan language, ISO 639-3 code "sva"
- SystemVerilog assertions
