= KRZY =

KRZY may refer to:

- KRZY (AM), a radio station (1450 AM) licensed to Albuquerque, New Mexico, United States
- KRZY-FM, a radio station (105.9 FM) licensed to Santa Fe, New Mexico, United States
