= KLLT =

KLLT may refer to:

- KTLK-FM, a radio station licensed to serve Columbia, Illinois, which used the KLLT call sign from 2016 to 2020
- KMRR, a radio station licensed to serve Spencer, Iowa, which used the KLLT call sign from 2000 to 2014
- KLLT (New Mexico), a now-defunct radio station licensed to serve Grants, New Mexico, which used the call sign while on-air from 1980 to 1988
