= KLLT (New Mexico) =

Radio station in Grants, New Mexico (1980–1988)

- Grants, New Mexico; United States
- Frequency: 95.3 MHz

Programming
- Format: Contemporary hit radio

History
- First air date: April 16, 1980
- Last air date: July 27, 1988
- Former call signs: KYKN (1980–1983)

Technical information
- Facility ID: 15662
- Class: A
- ERP: 3 kW
- HAAT: 215 ft (66 m)

KLLT was a radio station on 95.3 MHz in Grants, New Mexico, that operated between April 16, 1980, and July 27, 1988. The station's deep indebtedness, combined with a refusal of permission to build a mountaintop tower and move into the Albuquerque radio market, led the station to cease operations.

== History ==
On October 2, 1979, the Grants Broadcasting Company was granted a construction permit to build a new radio station on 95.3 in Grants, with a transmitter 4 miles (6.4 km) southwest of the city. KYKN signed on April 16, 1980, with a country format.

The Rainbow Broadcasting Corporation of Denver, owned by Michelle Z. Elliot, acquired KYKN in 1983 for $115,000. The new ownership changed the station's call letters to KLLT on October 31, though the country format remained. However, Rainbow ownership frequently changed hands. In 1984, Kapdin Communications acquired control of the company, and in 1986, Steven Humphries bought the entirety of Kapdin. By this time, KLLT, which had changed to contemporary hit radio earlier in the year, was deep in debt. Humphries agreed to buy the station for the assumption of its $175,000 in debt, and when he discovered another $125,000, he immediately filed for Chapter 11 bankruptcy reorganization.

Given the station's financial situation and limited facility covering Grants, the station sought a coverage and frequency upgrade as part of a program to move into Albuquerque. In February 1988, the Federal Communications Commission approved an application to move KLLT to 103.7 MHz and increase power to 50 kW. However, the United States Forest Service refused on two occasions to grant KLLT a land lease to construct the tower atop Mount Taylor that was necessary to carry out the improvements. With sales revenues continuing to decline, Humphries opted to take KLLT off the air on July 27, 1988.

However, KLLT's license continued to exist after Humphries took the station silent, a fact that would prove crucial to the course of events in another proceeding. Just days later, on August 2, Humphries filed to buy Santa Fe's KNMQ. The sale application prompted a petition to deny from Fairmont Communications Corp., owners of KKOB and KKOB-FM, which alleged that Humphries had put KLLT in bankruptcy the same day he had filed to buy the Santa Fe station, and that Humphries could not own both FM stations due to impermissible signal overlap. Humphries contended that Fairmont was upset that KNMQ had lured top-rated morning show host Paul Sisneros from KKOB, and that the overlap between the two stations would only have occurred if KLLT had been moved to Mount Taylor. In late January 1989, the FCC dismissed the transfer application, primarily on the signal overlap issue; Humphries filed a petition for reconsideration, claiming that with the station in bankruptcy, it was now the property of the bankruptcy trustee, but the deal took so long to complete that the application was withdrawn altogether.
