= KSVA =

- Albuquerque, New Mexico; United States
- Broadcast area: Albuquerque metropolitan area
- Frequency: 920 kHz
- Branding: LifeTalk Radio

Programming
- Format: Christian radio
- Affiliations: LifeTalk Radio

Ownership
- Owner: LifeTalk Radio, Inc.

History
- First air date: 1947
- Former call signs: KQEA (1946); KOAT (1947–1955); KQUE (1955–1958); KQEO (1958–1995); KHTL (1995–2000)
- Former frequencies: 1450 (1947–1951); 1240 (1951–1957)
- Call sign meaning: Sandia View Academy

Technical information
- Licensing authority: FCC
- Facility ID: 11230
- Class: B
- Power: 1,000 watts (day); 130 watts (night)
- Transmitter coordinates: 35°7′56.2″N 106°37′20.1″W
- Translator: 104.3 K282CD (Los Lunas)

Links
- Public license information: Public file; LMS
- Webcast: Listen live
- Website: www.lifetalk.net

KSVA is a Christian radio station licensed to Albuquerque, New Mexico, named after the original Sandia View Academy campus it was founded on, broadcasting on 920 AM. The station is an owned-and-operated affiliate of LifeTalk Radio.

== History ==
The station began broadcasting in 1947. The station's construction permit originally held the call sign KQEA, which was changed to KOAT on September 1, 1946; the new station initially broadcast on 1450 kHz. In 1951, the station moved to 1240 kHz. In 1955, the station's call sign was changed to KQUE as the station's original owner sold it in a fire sale to keep its recently-launched sister television station, KOAT-TV (channel 7) on the air. In 1957, the station moved to 920 kHz. In 1958, the station's call sign was changed to KQEO.

In the 1960s and 1970s KQEO aired a Top 40 format, and was for a time the leading Top 40 station in Albuquerque. In the early 1980s, the station aired an adult contemporary format, and by the mid-1980s the station was airing an oldies format. In the early and mid-1990s KQEO aired a news/talk format. On January 23, 1995, the station's call sign was changed to KHTL. As KHTL, the station aired a "Hot Talk" format.

LifeTalk Radio acquired the station in 2000, in a station swap with Citadel Communications, in which LifeTalk Radio received this station and $5 million in cash, in exchange for Albuquerque's AM 610. On April 17, 2000, the station's call sign was changed to KSVA.
