= KAVP =

- Colona, Colorado; United States
- Frequency: 1450 kHz
- Branding: ESPN 1450

Programming
- Format: Sports
- Affiliations: ESPN Radio

Ownership
- Owner: Western Slope Communications; (WS Communications, LLC)
- Sister stations: KAYW, KWGL, KZKS

History
- First air date: 2001

Technical information
- Licensing authority: FCC
- Facility ID: 82282
- Class: C
- Power: 1,000 watts (day); 1,000 watts (night)
- Transmitter coordinates: 38°23′16″N 107°40′28″W
- Translator: 97.5 K248AE (Montrose)

Links
- Public license information: Public file; LMS
- Website: www.wscradio.net/general-4

KAVP (1450 AM, "ESPN 1450") is a radio station licensed to serve Colona, Colorado, United States. The station is owned by Western Slope Communications and the broadcast license is held by WS Communications, LLC.

KAVP broadcasts a sports format as an affiliate of ESPN Radio.

== History ==
This station received its original construction permit from the Federal Communications Commission on April 15, 1997. The new station was assigned the KAVP call sign by the FCC on June 13, 1997. After multiple extensions, KAVP finally received its license to cover from the FCC on April 21, 2003.
