= KTZO =

The KTZO callsign in American broadcasting has in the past been used by:

- KOFY TV channel 20 in San Francisco was KTZO from 1980 to 1986.
- KDRF 103.3 FM in Albuquerque, New Mexico was KTZO from 2001 to 2004.
