= KRZY-FM =

Radio station in Santa Fe, New Mexico

Coordinates: 35.780°N 106.527°W

- Santa Fe, New Mexico; United States
- Broadcast area: Albuquerque metropolitan area
- Frequency: 105.9 MHz
- Branding: La Suavecita 105.9

Programming
- Format: Regional Mexican

Ownership
- Owner: Entravision Communications; (Entravision Holdings, LLC)
- Sister stations: KRZY

History
- First air date: November 1983 (as KNMQ)
- Former call signs: KNMQ (1983–1990); KOLT-FM (1990–1996)
- Call sign meaning: "Krazy" (former country format)

Technical information
- Licensing authority: FCC
- Facility ID: 65475
- Class: C
- ERP: 100,000 watts
- HAAT: 585 meters (1,919 ft)

Links
- Public license information: Public file; LMS
- Webcast: Listen live
- Website: elboton.com/nuevo-mexico/radiolasuavecita

KRZY-FM (105.9 MHz) is a regional Mexican music formatted radio station programmed by satellite, serving the Albuquerque metropolitan area. It is branded as "La Suavecita 105.9". It is owned by Entravision Communications which also owns local television stations KLUZ, a Univision affiliate, and KTFQ, an Unimás affiliate. It is licensed to Santa Fe, New Mexico.

== History ==
=== KNMQ ===
This station signed on in November 1983, as KNMQ-FM and aired a contemporary hit radio format branded as "HitRadio Q-106". The format soon became an instant success when it reached the number two spot in the Spring 1984 Arbitron ratings. The station continued to generate high ratings throughout the mid-1980s. By 1988, the station was facing more competition resulting in a drop in ratings which lead to three layoffs. Program director Steve Stucker also left to program a country station in Tulsa (he would later become a TV personality on KOB-TV).

By summer 1988, Mesa Grande Broadcasting would transfer ownership of the station to Steven Humphries who would make a few programing changes including hiring KKOB-FM personality Phil "The Bean" Sisneros as a new morning host. The owners of KKOB, Fairmont Communications, soon filed a petition requesting that the FCC deny the transfer citing Humphries ownership of Grants-based station KLLT which had been granted a construction permit earlier that year to broadcast a signal off of Mount Taylor which would have violated multiple ownership rules at that time which only allowed for one FM station per market. Humphries claimed the petition was a "sour grapes" attempt over the loss of Sisneros. The FCC would deny the transfer in early 1989. Humphries filed a petition for reconsideration but would withdraw by May 1989, leaving the station under Mesa Grande ownership. On January 30, 1990, the station dropped the CHR format. All airstaff remained except for Sisneros; he would return to KKOB-FM in April.

=== KOLT ===
On January 30, citing CHR fragmentation and decreasing shares, the station changed to a country music format as KOLT-FM ("Kolt 106"). The format was described as "country music with a CHR approach" in an effort to challenge KRST which at that time had risen to the top of the local ratings. In November, Mesa Grande would sell KOLT-FM to Clairmor Broadcasting Inc. for $1 million. By December 1992, Clairmor would sell the station to Commonwealth Broadcasting Co. for $1.3 million. In August 1995, Crescent Communications, which owned competitor KRST. would purchase KOLT for $1.3 million dollars. Now clustered with KRST the station shifted to a classic country format in 1996, called "Krazy 105.9" with the present day KRZY-FM call letters.

In April 1996, Citadel Communications would purchase the Crescent stations for $23 million. However, as Citadel had already acquired four other FM stations in the Albuquerque radio market (all of which had transmitters atop Sandia Crest) which put them over the new ownership limit, Citadel would spin off KRZY-FM and KRZY (1450 AM) to Spanish-language broadcaster EXCL Communications the following month.

=== Spanish-language formats ===
The 105.9 frequency has broadcast Spanish-language programming since 1996. Initially, it aired a Spanish adult contemporary format called "Radio Romantica" from 1996 to 2002. It changed to a regional Mexican format station called "Radio Tricolor 105.9" in October 2002. On June 24, 2004, it changed to a Latin pop music format called "Super Estrella", which lasted until November 2008.

Entravision moved adult hits formatted "José" to 105.9 FM in early November 2008. It had previously been on its sister station KRZY (AM) for about three years. The station had returned to the "Tricolor" format in early 2018; however, on January 7, 2019, the station's format was changed from regional Mexican as "La Tricolor" to Grupero and Cumbia music as "La Suavecita".
