= KMGA =

Adult contemporary radio station in Albuquerque

- Albuquerque, New Mexico; United States
- Broadcast area: Albuquerque/Santa Fe
- Frequency: 99.5 MHz
- Branding: Magic 99.5

Programming
- Format: Adult contemporary
- Affiliations: Westwood One

Ownership
- Owner: Cumulus Media; (Radio License Holding CBC, LLC)
- Sister stations: KDRF, KKOB, KKOB-FM, KOBQ, KNML, KRST, KTBL

History
- First air date: November 11, 1963 (as KARA-FM)
- Former call signs: KARA-FM (1963–1965); KBNM-FM (1965–1974); KMYR (1974–1977); KZZX (1977–1985)
- Call sign meaning: "Magic Albuquerque"

Technical information
- Licensing authority: FCC
- Facility ID: 11231
- Class: C
- ERP: 22,500 watts
- HAAT: 1,259 meters (4,131 ft)
- Transmitter coordinates: 35°12′44″N 106°26′58″W

Links
- Public license information: Public file; LMS
- Webcast: Listen live
- Website: www.magic995abq.com

KMGA (99.5 FM) is a commercial radio station licensed to Albuquerque, New Mexico. The station is owned by Cumulus Media and broadcasts an adult contemporary radio format. For much of November and December it switches to Christmas music. The radio studios and offices are in Downtown Albuquerque.

KMGA has an effective radiated power (ERP) of 22,500 watts. The transmitter tower is atop Sandia Crest east of the city.

== Programming ==
=== Personalities ===
Notable personalities on the station include nationally syndicated hosts Bob & Sheri (mornings) and John Tesh "Intelligence for Your Life" (evenings) along with local hosts Steph Duran (middays) and Doug Duroucher (afternoons). On January 1, 2018, KMGA changed slogans to "Today's Best Mix", with no changes in staff or format.

Past morning shows include Meredith Dunkel and Chris Fox of "The Meredith and Fox Show" which began in June 2015. Another change in mornings happened in November 2016 when Meredith was joined by a new co-host, Doug Durocher from San Bernardino, California. In January 2017 Bryan Simmons joined KMGA as program director from Los Angeles. In June 2017 a new host Steph Duran from sister station KRST joined the morning show replacing Meredith Dunkel who left for a new job in Tucson, Arizona. The show was then billed as "The Magic Morning Show with Doug & Duran".

Scott Simon and Rachel Michaels had hosted "Magic in the morning with Simon and Rachel" beginning in late May 2014. Simon and Rachel had moved over from country sister station KRST, which at that time had picked up the Nash FM brand as well as its national morning show. However Simon and Rachel were out after 11 months. Phil Moore had previously hosted mornings for seventeen years before retiring. By May 2012, KMGA became the market's only AC station. On January 31, 2025 the Morning Show is now hosted by Kiki Garcia she moved from sister station 93.3 The Q (KOBQ-FM).

=== Christmas music ===
For many years, KMGA plays Christmas music during part of November and most of December. Like most AC radio stations around the country, KMGA changes its format each year to playing all Christmas music beginning sometime in November until December 26. The slogan used during this period is "Albuquerque's Home for the Holidays".

In November 2017, Christmas music began the second week of November starting earlier than in the past. In another unusual move, Christmas music was also featured throughout Labor Day weekend in 2020 branded as "Quarantine Christmas" to "lift the spirits" of listeners in the midst of the COVID-19 pandemic.

== History ==
On November 11, 1963, the station first signed on as KARA-FM, the original call sign. KARA-FM would be a sister station to now defunct KARA 1310 AM and aired a beautiful music format that would simulcast from 4am to 6pm. Star Broadcasting purchased the station in 1965 and changed to KBNM. The station operated at 3.7 kW at 150 feet. In March 1971 KBNM expanded to a 24-hour broadcast with contemporary rock by day and middle-of-the-road music at night. In May 1974 Star Broadcasting sold KBNM to Fontana Media Corporation for $150,000. The station then changed to KMYR later that year with a "progressive" Album Oriented Rock format upgraded to 20 kW. In September 1977 Fontana sold KMYR to Sunbelt Communications for $415,000. The station then changed to KZZX. In July 1978 Sunbelt would also purchase KQEO AM 920 from Swanson Broadcasting for $900,000 In June 1985 Sunbelt would sell KZZX and KQEO along with KSPZ and KVOR in Colorado Springs to Penn Communications for $5.4 million. In September it would become KMGA with the "Magic 99" branding and Soft Adult Contemporary format. In 1990 KMGA and KQEO were sold to Spacecom for $1.5 million. By 1993 some new programming strategies helped KMGA to become more competitive in the market. In November 1993 Spacecom sold KMGA and KQEO to Citadel Communications for $1.4 million. Citadel would also purchase its main competitor 93.3 KKOB-FM and 770 KKOB in January 1994.

== Jingles and imaging ==
Currently, KMGA uses the "Pure AC Bright" jingle package. KMGA commissioned the Brighter version, and WWLI in Providence, Rhode Island, also owned by Cumulus, commissioned the Lighter version.

In the past KMGA used various packages from Reelworld until 2014.

KMGA uses the Benztown AC library for imaging, along with other AC stations owned by Cumulus.
