= KNML =

Sports radio station in Albuquerque, New Mexico

Coordinates: 35°1′56.6″N 106°39′34.3″W

- Albuquerque, New Mexico; United States
- Broadcast area: Albuquerque metropolitan area
- Frequency: 610 kHz
- Branding: The Sports Animal

Programming
- Format: Sports
- Affiliations: BetMGM Network; Westwood One Sports; Fox Sports Radio; Albuquerque Isotopes

Ownership
- Owner: Cumulus Media; (Radio License Holding CBC, LLC)
- Sister stations: KDRF; KKOB; KKOB-FM; KMGA; KOBQ; KRST; KTBL

History
- First air date: August 17, 1927
- Former call signs: KGGM (1927–1973); KRKE (1973–1986); KZSS (1986–1999); KSVA (1999–2000); KHTL (4/17/2000-4/24/2000)
- Former frequencies: 1470 kHz (1927–1928); 1370 kHz (1928–1929); 1230 kHz (1929–1941); 1260 kHz (1941–1947)
- Call sign meaning: "Animal"

Technical information
- Licensing authority: FCC
- Facility ID: 68608
- Class: B
- Power: 5,000 watts
- Translator: 95.9 K240BL (Albuquerque)

Links
- Public license information: Public file; LMS
- Webcast: Listen live
- Website: www.sportsanimalabq.com

KNML (610 AM "The Sports Animal") is a commercial radio station airing a sports format and licensed to Albuquerque, New Mexico. It is owned by Cumulus Media with studios and offices on 4th Street NW at Lomas Boulevard.

KNML is powered at 5,000 watts. The transmitter is off 2nd Street SW in South Valley, New Mexico, between the Rio Grande and the Albuquerque International Sunport. By day, the signal is non-directional. At night, to avoid interfering with other stations on 610 AM and adjacent channels, KNML uses a directional antenna with a three-tower array. This concentrates the signal in Albuquerque and Santa Fe. Programming is also heard on 250-watt FM translator K240BL at 95.9 MHz.

== Programming ==
The station has a long history of carrying play-by-play for local teams. KNML features some University of New Mexico sports teams coverage, mostly Lobos women's basketball, but the bulk of UNM coverage is handled by sister stations KKOB and KKOB-FM. KNML is the home of the Albuquerque Isotopes baseball team in the Pacific Coast League.

== History ==
=== Portable station ===
KNML was first licensed, as KGGM, on August 17, 1927, to Jay Peters of Inglewood, California. The station was a portable broadcasting station, that could be transported between various communities. The call letters were randomly selected from an alphabetic roster.

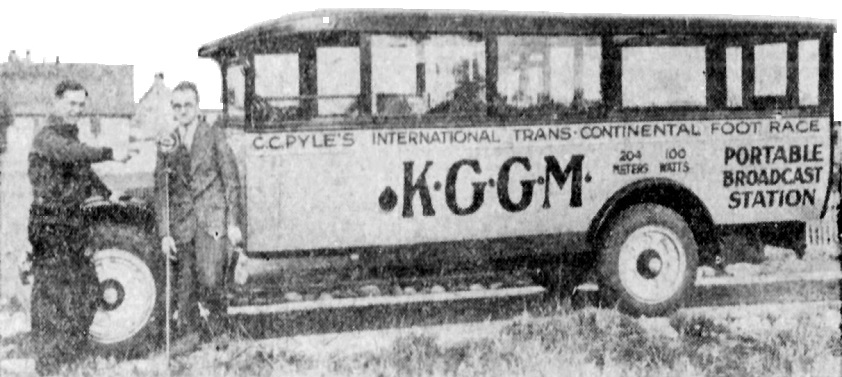
1928 publicity photograph of KGGM as a "portable broadcast station", used each evening along the route of a coast-to-coast foot race.

In early 1928, promoter C. C. Pyle organized a cross-country foot race divided into daily timed stages and run from Los Angeles to New York City. H. C. Shaw hired the KGGM equipment, carried on a specially prepared school bus, and was used to make broadcasts from the various race destinations. In late March the race was scheduled to end a leg in Albuquerque, and the station was set up to broadcast the runners' arrivals followed by their departures the following day. However, a financial dispute led to the race bypassing the city, although the station continued to follow the racers as they headed east. On May 10, a front-page article announced that the racers and KGGM had arrived in Elyria, Ohio, where the station was used to make a broadcast featuring Congressional Representative James T. Begg.

KGGM's future was uncertain as the race drew to a close. Owner Peters sued Pyle for more than $3,000 in unpaid costs for use of the station. In addition, a regulatory policy change threatened to delete the KGGM license altogether. In May 1928, the Federal Radio Commission (FRC) had announced that it planned to stop licensing portable facilities after July 1.

Following the race conclusion, KGGM travelled west, passing through Amarillo, Texas, on its way back to Los Angeles. Three days later it was announced that the station had returned to Albuquerque and would make two special broadcasts. By the time the broadcasts were made, tentative plans were in progress for KGGM to remain in Albuquerque. In the meantime, KGGM was given a 30-day extension on its license, to August 1, 1928.

=== Establishment in Albuquerque ===
At the end of July, the FRC approved the requests of Peters and Whitmore to license KGGM permanently in Albuquerque, giving the town its first radio station. (Note: At the time, KOB was still in Las Cruces, New Mexico.) The next year, Peters transferred KGGM's license to Whitmore. At the urging of the city of Albuquerque, Whitmore, who lacked experience in running a radio station, sold KGGM in March 1929 to the New Mexico Broadcasting Company, headed by Anton Hebenstreit. The station affiliated with the CBS Radio Network in 1939. Through the 1940s and '50s, the station carried CBS's dramas, comedies, news, sports and soap operas during the "Golden Age of Radio."

KGGM transmitted on 1470 kHz both while a portable station and during its initial months in Albuquerque. On November 11, 1928, as part of a nationwide reallocation by the FRC, it moved to 1370 kHz, which was followed by a move to 1230 kHz in early 1929. Two attempts to move down the dial were rejected, and on March 29, 1941, KGGM, along with the other stations on 1230 kHz, moved to 1260 kHz due to the implementation of the North American Regional Broadcasting Agreement (NARBA). In 1946 the station was granted approval to move to its current frequency of 610 kHz, which took place on May 9, 1947, and allowed sister station KVSF in Santa Fe to upgrade by relocating to the vacated 1260 kHz assignment.

=== KRKE and KZSS ===
In 1973, citing their desire to focus on KGGM-TV and comply with multiple ownership rules (the combination with KVSF remained grandfathered), the Hebenstreits sold KGGM radio to Gaylord Broadcasting for $720,000. The call letters were changed to KRKE on December 31. KRKE had a Top 40 format, playing the popular hits of the day for the young people of Albuquerque. It sometimes simulcast with KRKE-FM 94.1, which had a similar contemporary hits sound.

The call letters changed again in 1986 to KZSS, with 610 AM simulcasting with its FM sister station–by then KZRR–for nearly a decade. The two stations had an album rock format, playing top titles from the best-selling rock albums. In 1997, KZSS broke from the simulcast. It began running a "personal achievement" format, which in 1999 was traded off for the 95.1 FM frequency with KSVA. Citadel Broadcasting then traded KHTL (920 AM) for 610 AM. Citadel merged with Cumulus Media on September 16, 2011.

=== The Sports Animal ===
Logo from 2000 to 2017

The Sports Animal format began in 1994, originally appearing on KRZY (1450 AM). In 1996, after KRZY had been sold to a Spanish-language broadcaster, Citadel moved the Sports Animal format to 1050 AM, using KNML as a call sign. In 2000, the Sports Animal format was moved once again to its current home at 610 AM, the second-strongest AM signal in Albuquerque, which included the transfer of the KNML call letters.

KNML was the home of Don Imus and his syndicated wake up show, Imus in the Morning. It was carried until April 12, 2007. Previous program directors include: Andrew Paul (later with KXNT in Las Vegas), Dennis Glasgow and Ian Martin, who worked for the station beginning in 1999 and resigned during the week of July 15, 2008. Other station personalities included: Gary Herron (KQTM), Dom Zarella, Jeff Lukas, Blake Taylor (KMJ), Bob Clark (KKOB), Mike Powers (KRQE) and Brandon Vogt (KKOB).

== FM translator ==
Beginning on November 30, 2017, KNML began simulcasting on the FM band over translator station K240BL, licensed to Albuquerque and broadcasting at 95.9 MHz. Its power is 250 watts, low for an FM station. But it has a tower on Sandia Crest at 3251 meters (10,666 feet) above sea level, so it is easily heard around the Albuquerque radio market.

The translator had been owned by Carl G. Brasher and was silent between April and November 2017. Previously it had aired programming from KIVA from 2013 to 2017 and KKNS from 2008 to 2013 as well as various stations in years past.

Broadcast translator for KNML
| Call sign | Frequency | City of license | FID | ERP (W) | Class | FCC info |
|---|---|---|---|---|---|---|
| K240BL | 95.9 FM | Albuquerque, New Mexico | 8824 | 250 | D | LMS |
