= KTBL =

Radio station in Los Ranchos de Albuquerque, New Mexico

Coordinates: 34°58′46.2″N 106°44′15.1″W

- Los Ranchos de Albuquerque, New Mexico; United States
- Broadcast area: Albuquerque metropolitan area
- Frequency: 1050 kHz
- Branding: 94.5 The Pit

Programming
- Format: Active rock
- Affiliations: Compass Media Networks

Ownership
- Owner: Cumulus Media; (Radio License Holding CBC, LLC)
- Sister stations: KDRF, KKOB, KKOB-FM, KMGA, KNML, KOBQ, KRST

History
- First air date: 1987 (as KNXX)
- Former call signs: KMBA (1989–1993); KJBO (1993–1995); KHFN (1995–1996); KNML (1996–2000); KHTL (2000–2001)

Technical information
- Licensing authority: FCC
- Facility ID: 48604
- Class: B
- Power: 1,000 watts
- Translator: 94.5 K233CG (Sandia)

Links
- Public license information: Public file; LMS
- Webcast: Listen live
- Website: 945thepit.com

KTBL (1050 AM) is a commercial radio station licensed to the village of Los Ranchos de Albuquerque, New Mexico, and serves the Albuquerque metropolitan area. It is owned by Cumulus Media and its studios are located in Downtown Albuquerque and the transmitter tower is located in South Valley, New Mexico. KTBL operates with 1,000 watts. The station airs an active rock format branded as "94.5 The Pit" with the use of FM translator K233CG broadcasting at 250 watts off Sandia Crest.

== History ==
This station signed on in December 1987 as KNXX. The station featured a big band music format; however, it would be short lived due to operation costs, and went dark in July 1988. In April 1989, the station returned to the air as KMBA with a business talk format. In July 1993, with the talk format getting no ratings, it changed to KJBO with an oldies music format co-owned by radio personality Bobby Box called "Juke Box Oldies". Bobby Box would also be the morning announcer on KJBO. The music on the station would feature only American artists concentrating on music from 1954 to 1965.

In October 1994, KJBO was sold to the owners of classical music station KHFM when the stations' principal owner Don Davis wanted to devote full attention to FM start-up KRZN (101.3 FM). The format would soon switch to news and information under new call letters KHFN. In March 1996, both KHFM (then on 96.3 FM) and KHFN were sold to Citadel Broadcasting for $5.75 million. In October of that year, the call letters on 1050 were switched to KNML, and the station moved to a sports radio format branded as "The Sports Animal", which was moved from KRZY (1450 AM) after Citadel had divested the station to a Spanish language broadcaster.

In 2000, Citadel acquired the stronger 610 AM signal for $5.4 million, while swapping 920 AM to Life Talk Broadcasting, and in April, had moved KNML to that signal. The former KNML at 1050 AM would pick up the KHTL call sign from 920 AM. KHTL previously aired a "hot talk" format on 920, but on 1050, it aired a business talk format. In February 2001, 1050 had picked up the call sign KTBL from 103.3 FM. KTBL had previously been a traditional country music format branded as "K-Bull"; on 1050 AM, it had aired a classic country music format with the "K-Bull" brand after 103.3 FM changed to an adult album alternative format.

=== Talk Business Life ===
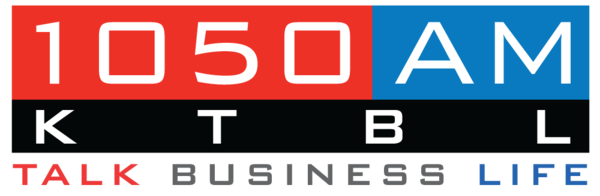
Logo as a talk station

In spring 2002, KTBL changed to a syndicated talk radio format. The talk format was mainly from a conservative viewpoint. KTBL principally aired nationally syndicated shows from Westwood One, a subsidiary of parent company Cumulus Media. KTBL also aired national news updates from Westwood One News (Fox News Radio before that) throughout the day. Shows featured over the years included Don Imus (mornings 2008-2018), Glenn Beck, Mike Huckabee, Laura Ingraham, Michael Savage, and many others. Some shows would at times be shifted between KKOB and KTBL. The station was promoted as "KKOB's talk partner".

Citadel merged with Cumulus Media on September 16, 2011.

=== The Pit ===
On February 18, 2020, KTBL began simulcasting on translator K233CG (94.5 FM), and flipped to active rock, branded as "94.5 The Pit".

Broadcast translator for KTBL
Call sign	Frequency	City of license	FID	ERP (W)	HAAT	Class	FCC info
K233CG	94.5 FM	Sandia, New Mexico	88468	250 vertical	1,240 m (4,068 ft)	D	LMS
