= SequenceVariantAnalyzer =

SequenceVariantAnalyzer (SVA) is a computer program for annotating and analyzing genetic variants called (identified) from a whole genome or exome sequencing study (Shotgun sequencing).

== Introduction ==
=== Background ===
DNA sequence information underpins genetic research, enabling discoveries of important biological or medical benefit. Compared with previous discovery strategies, a whole-genome sequencing study is no longer constrained by differing patterns of linkage disequilibrium, thus, in theory, is more possible to directly identify the genetic variants contributing to biological traits or medical outcomes.

The rapidly evolving high-throughput DNA sequencing technologies have now allowed the rapid generation of large amounts of sequence data for the purpose of performing such whole-genome sequencing studies, at a reasonable cost. SequenceVariantAnalyzer, or SVA, is software that analyzes genetic variants identified in such studies.

=== Functions ===
SVA is designed for two specific aims:

(1) To annotate the biological functions of the identified genetic variants and group them, conveniently;

(2) To find the genetic variants that are associated with or responsible for the biological traits or medical outcomes of interest.

=== Language ===
SVA is developed on the Java platform.

=== Authors ===
SVA is developed and maintained by Dr. Dongliang Ge and Dr. David B. Goldstein at Duke University, Center for Human Genome Variation.
