= KKOB-FM =

News/talk radio station in Albuquerque, New Mexico

Simulcast with KKOB
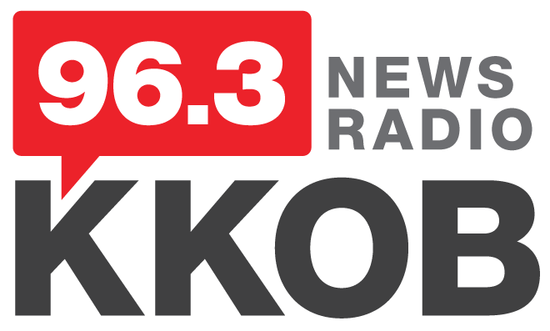

Albuquerque, New Mexico; United States
- Broadcast area: Albuquerque metropolitan area
- Frequency: 96.3 MHz
- Branding: 96.3 News Radio KKOB

Programming
- Format: News–talk
- Network: ABC News Radio
- Affiliations: Westwood One; New Mexico Lobos; Premiere Networks

Ownership
- Owner: Cumulus Media, Inc.; (Radio License Holding CBC, LLC)
- Sister stations: KDRF; KKOB; KMGA; KNML; KOBQ; KRST; KTBL

History
- First air date: November 1954; 71 years ago (as KHFM)
- Former call signs: KHFM (1954–2001); KRIF (4/09/2001-4/16/2001); KBZU (2001–2020)
- Call sign meaning: derived from sister station KKOB

Technical information
- Licensing authority: FCC
- Facility ID: 48596
- Class: C
- ERP: 20,000 watts
- HAAT: 1,260 meters (4,130 ft)
- Transmitter coordinates: 35°12′44.1″N 106°27′0″W

Links
- Public license information: Public file; LMS
- Webcast: Listen live
- Website: www.newsradiokkob.com

KKOB-FM (96.3 MHz) is a commercial radio station in Albuquerque, New Mexico. It is owned by Cumulus Media and it simulcasts a news/talk radio format with co-owned KKOB (770 AM). The studios and offices are on 4th Street NW in downtown Albuquerque. KKOB-AM-FM use the FM station's dial position for the moniker "96.3 News Radio KKOB".

KKOB-FM has an effective radiated power (ERP) of 20,000 watts. The transmitter is on Sandia Crest, amid many FM and TV towers.

== Programming ==
=== News and talk ===
KKOB-AM-FM provide local news and weather updates around the clock, traffic "on the 7's" and national news updates from ABC News Radio. On weekdays, the schedule features mostly local talk shows including Bob Clark in morning drive time, Brandon Vogt middays, TJ Trout afternoons and Eric Strauss in the evening. The rest of the schedule is nationally syndicated talk radio programs: The Vince Show with Vince Coglianese, The Mark Levin Show, Red Eye Radio and America in The Morning.

Weekends include shows on money, health, home repair, gardening, cars, pets, travel and technology, some of which are paid brokered programming. Terry Travis hosts a local talk show on weekend mornings. Syndicated programs on weekends include The Chris Plante Show, World Travel with Rudy Maxa and Sunday Nights with Bill Cunningham.

=== Sports ===
KKOB-AM-FM broadcast University of New Mexico Lobos basketball and football games. Some other Lobo sports can also be heard on co-owned sports radio station KNML 610 AM.

== History ==
=== Classical KHFM ===
The station launched in November 1954 as the second FM and first commercial FM station in Albuquerque. FM 96.3 was the home of classical music station KHFM for over 46 years. Citadel Broadcasting acquired KHFM and sister station KHFN (1050 AM) for $5.75 million in March 1996.

In March 2001, Citadel made an agreement with American General Media to move the classical format to its current home on 95.5 FM, while Citadel would continue to handle advertising for the station. That agreement ended in 2005, with control of KHFM taken over by American General Media. (In 2017, as part of a deal where American General bought Univision's entire Albuquerque cluster, KHFM was spun off to a non-profit organization known as KHFM Community Partners. It would operate 95.5 FM as a listener-supported station.)

=== Classic rock and hot talk KBZU ===
In early April 2001, 96.3 became a classic rock station branded as "The Buzzard", with the call sign changing to KBZU. "The Buzzard" challenged area rock radio rivals KIOT and KZRR, and used a slogan claiming to play "Real Classic Rock", featuring a mix that was somewhat harder than most classic rock stations at the time by avoiding songs that had crossed over onto the Top 40 charts. It played only classic bands and no modern rock that it dubbed as "weird". That format also included the syndicated Bob & Tom Show in the morning, and in late 2006, it added Opie and Anthony in the afternoon. Nights with Alice Cooper also aired on "The Buzzard" at night in later years. Some local personalities had also been featured as well throughout its run. Over the years, however, the station consistently lagged behind its competitors in the Arbitron ratings.

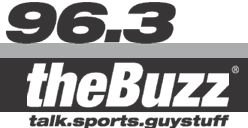
Logo through August 2008

The station aired a hot talk format, titled "96.3 The Buzz", from February 12, 2007, until August 2, 2008. Bob & Tom and Opie and Anthony retained their drive time slots; additional hosts included Dennis Miller, Mike O'Meara (before that, Don & Mike), and Tom Leykis. The station also featured locally produced programs, including the morning "zu", featuring "Chad" and "The Weezle". Citadel Broadcasting also divested KBZU to Last Bastion Station Trust on June 12, 2007, but it was reclaimed by the now-Cumulus Media effective April 30, 2013.

KBZU aired a Spanish language sports talk format broadcasting the national ESPN Deportes Radio network from August 2, 2008, until May 15, 2009. This format generated no Arbitron ratings at all during its nine-month run.

On May 22, 2009, KBZU returned to a classic rock music format branded as "96.3 The Mountain" with the slogan "Duke City's Classic Rock". All music and disc jockeys came from a satellite feed of The Classic Rock Experience, which was provided by Citadel Media. There was no local content, excluding commercials.

=== Nash Icon ===
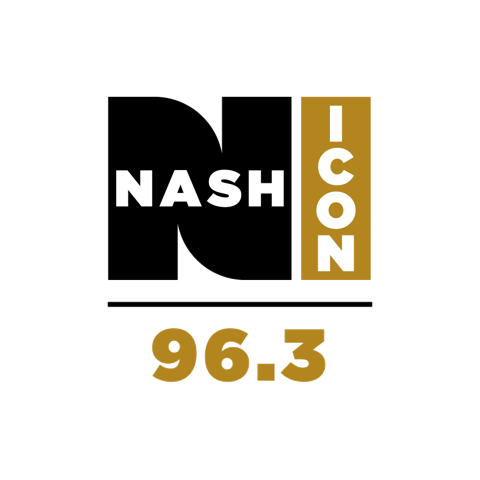
Logo from 2014-2020

On August 15, 2014, at 5 p.m., KBZU became one of the first affiliates of the new "Nash Icon" network as 96.3 Nash Icon. KBZU was one of thirteen stations Cumulus had flipped to the new format.

"96.3 Nash Icon" aired country music, mostly from the 1980s, 1990s and early 2000s. The station shared the "Nash" brand with current-based country sister station KRST until it dropped the "Nash" brand in June 2019. "Nash Icon" was developed by Cumulus Media, used on numerous Cumulus stations across the country as well as some non-Cumulus stations. Described as a "Hot AC for Country", the format focused on popular country hits from the mid-1980s to early 2000s from the biggest artists of that time (the "Icons") such as Garth Brooks, Reba McEntire, George Strait, Shania Twain and Alan Jackson along with some new material to be released on the new "Nash Icon" record label. Nash Icon played about 25-40% new material, without some current trends such as "Bro-country" heard on current based country stations.

In April 2015, Tony Lynn, who had been a long time morning host at KRST in the 1990s and KBQI from 2000 to 2011, returned to the air on KBZU in the afternoon. Other personalities included Kris Abrams in mornings, Paul Bailey in middays and Johnboy Crenshaw during nights.

=== News/talk KKOB-FM ===
The call letters KKOB-FM had long been assigned to co-owned 93.3, which has a Top 40/CHR format that was branded as "KOB-FM" for many years. On November 15, 2019, that station rebranded as "93.3 The Q" and changed call letters to KOBQ. Initially, it was believed that this was done to avoid confusion with KKOB, which had broadcast on translator K233CG (94.5 FM) since September 2016. However, the KKOB-FM call letters were in fact being reassigned to 96.3 to simulcast the heritage news and talk format from KKOB.

The simulcast began at 9:00 a.m. on January 6, 2020, along with the change in call letters to KKOB-FM. The simulcast reflects a trend with young-to-middle aged listeners avoiding the AM band, even for a radio station they might like if heard on FM.
