= KDRF =

Albuquerque, New Mexico; United States
- Broadcast area: Albuquerque, New Mexico; Santa Fe, New Mexico
- Frequency: 103.3 MHz
- Branding: 103-3 Ed FM

Programming
- Format: Adult hits

Ownership
- Owner: Cumulus Media; (Radio License Holding CBC, LLC)
- Sister stations: KKOB, KKOB-FM, KOBQ, KRST, KMGA, KNML, KTBL

History
- First air date: 1987 (as KIDI)
- Former call signs: KIDI (1987–1992); KASY (1992–1996); KTBL (1996–2001); KTZO (2001–2004)
- Call sign meaning: FReD spelled backwards (former branding)

Technical information
- Licensing authority: FCC
- Facility ID: 55052
- Class: C
- ERP: 20,000 watts
- HAAT: 1,293 meters (4,242 ft)
- Transmitter coordinates: 35°12′50″N 106°27′1″W

Links
- Public license information: Public file; LMS
- Webcast: Listen live
- Website: ed.fm

KDRF (103.3 MHz) is a radio station in Albuquerque, New Mexico. It is owned by Cumulus Media and has an adult hits format as "Ed FM" and uses the slogan "Playing Stuff We Like." Its studios are located in Downtown Albuquerque and the transmitter tower is located atop Sandia Crest east of the city.

== History ==
=== Early history: 1987-1992 ===
The 103.3 frequency signed on in 1987 as KIDI with a Spanish-language contemporary music format. In January 1992 the Guadalajara Chili Pepper Company sold KIDI to Ramar Communications for $1 million along with a construction permit for TV channel 50 (then identified as KBQE).

=== Country: 1992-2001 ===
By September 1992 it switched to a country music format as KASY ("Y-103/Cat Country") to challenge KRST. In March 1996, Ramar Communications sold KASY-FM to Citadel Broadcasting for five million dollars. The following month Citadel also acquired KRST and KRZY AM & FM from Crescent Communications for 23 million dollars and by October of that year Citadel divested both KRZY stations to a Spanish language broadcaster. KRST kept the new country format and 103.3 became KTBL ("K-Bull") which played classic country. This gave Citadel complete dominance over the popular country music radio market in Albuquerque until 2000, when Clear Channel Communications launched KBQI-FM "Big I 107.9" to challenge KRST which had also hired morning personalities Tony Lynn and Miles Copeland. KRST saw its ratings slashed as a result.

=== Adult Album Alternative (AAA): 2001-2003 ===
Logo for KTZO-FM, once a popular alternative rock radio station in Albuquerque

In February 2001, 103.3 dropped its classic country format and moved the KTBL callsign and format to 1050 AM. After stunting from February 12–14 with all R.E.M., U2 and Dave Matthews Band each day, 103.3 launched as "103-3 The Zone" at 10am on February 15 with Running Up That Hill by Kate Bush as the first song played. The callsign was changed to KTZO on February 19. KTZO originally had an adult alternative music format, playing in 20 song sets as a "quality rock" station. The Zone was designed to challenge Clear Channel's KPEK-FM "The Peak", which was playing mostly "softer" alternative bands at the time, but still played a great deal of pop songs targeted at a mostly female audience. Like its eventual successor, KTZO attempted to run without DJs until late 2001, when it had added an airstaff which included former KTEG morning host, Micheal Moxey, in morning drive. Other personalities included Don Kelly, Leah Black, Scott Souhrada, and later Forrest, Brian and Kit Missile.

=== Modern rock: 2003-2004 ===
The format shifted to modern rock in early 2003, adding hard rock acts such as System of a Down and Korn, but also keeping bands like Coldplay from its old format and also playing 1990s alternative bands such as Green Day and Bush as well as modern bands including The White Stripes, Modest Mouse and The Killers which were not heard on other local stations. It also held an annual "Battle of the Bands" competition for local bands. The winner received regular airplay on the station. Soular gained a local fanbase after winning the first competition in 2002. Feels Like Sunday and Hollis Wake won later contests.

=== Adult hits: 2004-present ===
KDRF was originally launched on December 30, 2004, as "103-3 Fred FM", but in March 2005, XM Satellite Radio claimed the name "Fred" to be a trademark of their classic alternative station. The name was then shortened to "Ed" to avoid fighting a costly legal battle. The station has no DJs and has a wide playlist of Top 40 hits from the early 1970s to the present. KDRF is also streamed online. Since 2015, Ed FM does "80s Throwback" playing all hits from the 1980s about every other weekend. Joe Cipriano had been the station imaging voice for many years.

In April 2007, eD-FM enlisted Tom Dickson of Blendtec to do a Will It Blend? version to promote the station. The three 30-second commercials show different styles of music CDs being blended, showcasing the station's variety format. The commercials aired on all Albuquerque TV stations over a four-week period. The commercials returned in late 2007 after the first campaign saw improved ratings for the station.

Citadel merged with Cumulus Media on September 16, 2011.

On December 2, 2021, KDRF added the Greg Beharrell show in which bits of the show air throughout the day. Beharrell also became the new imaging voice for the station.
