= KOB (TV) =

Television station in Albuquerque, New Mexico

- Albuquerque–Santa Fe, New Mexico; United States
- City: Albuquerque, New Mexico
- Channels: Digital: 26 (UHF); Virtual: 4
- Branding: KOB 4

Programming
- Affiliations: 4.1: NBC; for others, see § Subchannels

Ownership
- Owner: Hubbard Broadcasting; (KOB-TV, LLC)

History
- First air date: November 29, 1948
- Former call signs: KOB-TV (1948–2009)
- Former channel numbers: Analog: 4 (VHF, 1948–2009)
- Former affiliations: All secondary: ABC (1949–1953); CBS (1949–1953); DuMont (1948–1954); United (secondary, 1967)
- Call sign meaning: From former sister stations KOB-AM–FM

Technical information
- Licensing authority: FCC
- Facility ID: 35313
- ERP: 270 kW
- HAAT: 1,277 m (4,190 ft)
- Transmitter coordinates: 35°12′42.1″N 106°27′0.5″W
- Translator(s): see § Translators

Links
- Public license information: Public file; LMS
- Website: www.kob.com

KOB (channel 4) is a television station in Albuquerque, New Mexico, United States, affiliated with NBC and owned by Hubbard Broadcasting. The station's studios are located on Broadcast Plaza just west of downtown, and its transmitter is located on Sandia Crest, east of Albuquerque.

KOB was Albuquerque's and New Mexico's first television station, beginning broadcasting on November 29, 1948. It was set up by Albuquerque radio station KOB (770 AM), which remained co-owned with it until 1986. It held affiliations with all four television networks of the period until 1953, when two other TV stations started in the city. KOB was sold twice in its first decade of operation, in 1952 to Time Inc. and former Federal Communications Commission chairman Wayne Coy and again in 1957 to what today is Hubbard Broadcasting. Its newscasts led the ratings until the mid-1970s, when KOAT-TV surpassed it for first. Despite attempts to compete, KOB's news has mostly remained in second place over its history.

== History ==
Television-related activity by Albuquerque radio station KOB (770 AM) predated World War II. In December 1943, KOB applied for a permit for an experimental television station. Seven months later, in July 1944, KOB applied for television channel 1 on a fully commercial basis. Having already ordered equipment, KOB stated it was in position to bring television to Albuquerque once wartime prohibitions on equipment production were lifted. The permit was granted on May 21, 1946, and the application was adjusted later that year to specify channel 4. KOB reiterated its desire to provide television service when the equipment became available. It was also announced that KOB's station would be on the NBC television network when it was extended to Albuquerque and would operate from a site leased from the University of New Mexico, using a tower left behind by a defunct Federal Communications Commission (FCC) monitoring station.

In May 1948, KOB announced that KOB-TV would begin broadcasting in August. By that time, the station had taken delivery of the second commercial TV transmitter built by RCA. KOB-TV started operations on November 29, 1948, to an audience of an estimated 100 television receivers. It was the first television station in New Mexico. Programs from NBC and the DuMont Television Network were shipped to Albuquerque on film for airing. Affiliations with CBS and ABC were added in January and July 1949, respectively. The station broadcast a variety of local events, such as a Border Conference track and field meet and University of New Mexico and high school football games.

KOB radio and television, owned by an affiliate of the Albuquerque Journal newspaper, were sold in 1952 to magazine publisher Time Inc. and former FCC chairman Wayne Coy. It was Time's first investment in television. That same year, the FCC lifted a freeze, lasting three and a half years, on new television station allocations. Two additional VHF channels, 7 and 13, were assigned to Albuquerque. KOB entered into a joint venture with one of the new stations, KGGM-TV (channel 13, now KRQE), in May 1953 to develop Sandia Crest as a television transmitter site. The facility promised to provide television to previously unserved areas of New Mexico. KGGM-TV, a CBS affiliate, and KOAT-TV (channel 7), an ABC affiliate, debuted days apart in October 1953. KOB-TV continued to air DuMont programs until it was replaced by KOAT-TV in the network in June 1954.

While they were competitors, KGGM and KOB also joined in the construction of studios. The stations purchased an entire city block at Fourteenth Street and Coal Avenue SW, divided it, and put up studios across the street from each other. The KOB building, which the station occupied in April 1954, was two stories tall and contained two studios.

The end of the freeze also brought live network broadcasting to Albuquerque. By 1952, KOB-TV was the only television station in the United States not directly interconnected with a network. Albuquerque was connected to live network programming in September 1954.

=== Hubbard ownership ===
In 1956, Time Inc. acquired three television stations from Consolidated Television and Radio Broadcasters of Indianapolis. Time already owned three TV stations including KOB-TV, and at six stations, it surpassed the FCC ownership limit of five. It decided to sell the KOB stations. They were purchased by KSTP, Inc., owner of KSTP radio and KSTP-TV in St. Paul, Minnesota, for $1.5 million.

KSTP, Inc.—renamed Hubbard Broadcasting in 1962—invested in upgrades to the station's technical facility. In 1957, it purchased a new, more powerful transmitter and donated the old one to Albuquerque's new educational television station, KNME-TV (channel 5). The studio facility was expanded in 1960. In August 1967, KOB-FM 93.3 debuted. The KOB radio stations were sold by Hubbard to Price Communications in 1986 and adopted the call sign KKOB at the start of 1987.

KOB-TV expanded its regional footprint in the 1980s, as part of an attempt to add viewers and improve its news ratings. In 1983, it acquired KIVA-TV, the NBC affiliate in Farmington, New Mexico. Hubbard renamed the station KOBF and built new studios in Farmington. KOB acquired the NBC affiliate in Roswell, KSWS-TV (channel 8), in a deal announced in 1983. The purchase was completed in 1985 after opposition from KGGM-TV was resolved; the station then became KOBR, and KOB set out to expand the station's local news offerings and build a studio. In 1986, KOB applied for a channel to be added to Grand Junction, Colorado, for the establishment of another semi-satellite station.

KOB logo, used from 1996 to 2010

KOBF debuted an expanded news service in 1989, which included news inserts into KOB's newscasts that covered the Four Corners region. By 1996, KOBF aired a 16-minute insert into KOB's 6 p.m. newscast and a 22-minute insert into its 10 p.m. program. Local news inserts at KOBF and KOBR were discontinued in 2007.

== News operation ==
As of December 2025, KOB broadcast 29 1/2 hours a week of locally produced newscasts each week, as well as a weekly public affairs program, Eye on New Mexico, and Football Night in New Mexico, a weekly sports program aired during the National Football League season.

For most of the 1960s and early 1970s, KOB and KOAT waged a spirited battle for the ratings lead, though as late as 1971 KOB held a 14-point lead over KOAT. Between 1974 and 1976, on the advice of broadcast consultant Frank Magid and his firm, anchor Johnny Morris quit (later to work at KOAT); weathercaster George Fischbeck quit; and sportscaster Mike Roberts was fired. Channel 7 surged ahead in early 1976, pushing KOB to second. KOB spent much of the late 1970s seeking to fight back against KOAT, led by top-rated anchorman Dick Knipfing, whom KOB attempted to lure away in 1976. In April 1979, Knipfing announced he would move to KOB, even though he had a contract with KOAT that ran through August 1980. Station management and Magid believed Knipfing's success at KOAT was the main obstacle to improving ratings for KOB's newscasts and predicted they would soon rise to first place. Even though KOAT fired Knipfing in June 1979, it sued to keep Knipfing off the air until his contract with that station lapsed; an opinion from the United States District Court allowed him to proceed with his plans to begin anchoring at channel 4 on August 1.

The Knipfing hiring was not the success station management hoped it would be. Ed Otte, city editor for The Santa Fe New Mexican, noted that KOB had added Knipfing to its newscast without improving its other on-air personalities or reporting team, which he felt were inferior to KOAT's. KOAT still led in most news ratings surveys between 1979 and 1981, when Knipfing received the added title of news director; he was one of three news directors in five years. In 1983, the station switched its newscasts to a co-anchor format. In March 1986, the station dismissed Knipfing.

A common complaint of KOB's newscasts in the 1970s and 1980s was the reliance on Magid to determine by research the station's newscast format and elements. Magid and the Hubbard family were close personal friends. Johnny Morris, a former KOB weathercaster who—after being dismissed from channel 4 in 1974, reportedly at Magid's suggestion—later worked at KOAT. Other local news employees believed Magid had a poor grasp of the Albuquerque market. Months after being ousted, Knipfing wrote an editorial in The Albuquerque Tribune heavily critical of KOB. He wrote, "The problem was Magid ... It was very difficult assembling a consistent news team with consultants looking over our shoulders all the time." He noted inconsistency and turnover in everything from production to management and sports talent. Former KOB news director Mark Slimp blamed Magid for his dismissal.

In the 1980s and 1990s, KOB expanded its newscast offerings beyond two evening newscasts. A half-hour 6:30 a.m. newscast debuted in 1985 and was expanded to an hour in 1989. A second evening newscast at 5:30 p.m. was added in 1994. KOB posed a ratings challenge to KOAT at the start of the 1990s, posting wins in some surveys and narrowing the gap with KOAT, but by 1994, it had slipped to a much more distant second.

Brad Remington became KOB's news director in 1996 and retooled the newscast to emphasize breaking news, investigative reporting, and weather, including an investment in new equipment. By 2001, KOB's 10 p.m. news had tied KOAT in total households while having larger concentrations of younger viewers. After KRQE completed a turnaround in the 2000s, KOB slipped to third in late news, though its morning newscast continued to lead its competitors. By 2022, KOB was second in late news ratings among total households.

In November 2000, KOB began producing a 9 p.m. newscast, Fox 2 News at Nine, for Albuquerque's Fox affiliate, KASA-TV (channel 2). The newscast ended in 2006 when KRQE's parent company, LIN TV, purchased KASA and replaced the KOB-produced newscast with its own. KOB resumed producing news for KASA-TV—this time as a Telemundo station—in 2021, after NBCUniversal acquired KASA.

=== Notable former on-air staff ===
- George Fischbeck – weathercaster, 1970–1972
- Mike Roberts – sportscaster, 1966–1972, 1973–1976
- Gadi Schwartz – reporter
- Jane Wells – reporter

== Technical information ==
=== Subchannels ===
KOB's transmitter is located on Sandia Crest. The station's signal is multiplexed:

Subchannels of KOB
Subchannel	Res.	Short name	Programming
4.1	1080i	KOBDT1	NBC
4.2	480i	KOB-DT2	Heroes & Icons
4.3	480i	KOBDT3	MeTV
4.4	480i	KOBDT4	Catchy Comedy
4.5	480i	KOBDT5	Ion Plus
4.6	480i	KOBDT6	Ion Television
4.7	480i	KOBDT7	Start TV

=== Analog-to-digital conversion ===
KOB-TV began providing a digital signal on UHF channel 26 on August 2, 2002. It ceased analog broadcasting on June 12, 2009, the digital television transition date. The station's digital signal remained on its pre-transition UHF channel 26, using virtual channel 4.

=== Satellite stations ===
Two stations rebroadcast KOB's signal and insert local content for other parts of the media market:

Satellite stations of KOB
Station	City of license	Channels	First air date	Former call signs	ERP	HAAT	Facility ID	Transmitter coordinates	Public license information
KOBF	Farmington	12; 12 (VHF)	October 20, 1972	KIVA-TV (1972–1983)	30 kW	125 m (410 ft)	35321	36°41′43″N 108°13′16″W	Public file; LMS
KOBR	Roswell	8; 8 (VHF)	June 24, 1953	KSWS-TV (1953–1985)	40 kW	533 m (1,749 ft)	62272	33°22′31.3″N 103°46′14.3″W	Public file; LMS

KOBF and KOBR each have histories before their acquisition by KOB. KSWS-TV in Roswell went on the air on June 24, 1953, and in 1957, it began broadcasting from a tower at Caprock that at the time was the world's tallest structure. at 1,610 feet (490 m). The tower fell due to an ice storm in December 1960, and a new 875-foot (267 m) tower was constructed by 1962. It was sold to KCBD-TV of Lubbock, Texas, in 1968 and became a satellite of that station. It became KOBR on September 1, 1985. Farmington's KIVA-TV started broadcasting on October 20, 1972; it received NBC programs from KOA-TV, then the NBC affiliate in Denver, because KOB-TV did not grant permission for the new station to use its feed. It was acquired by KOB in 1983 and became KOBF.

KOB formerly operated a third satellite station, KOBG-TV (channel 6) in Silver City, which signed on in 2000. Its transmitter was located at 32°51′49″N 108°14′29.6″W. KOBG had a permit to construct a digital station on channel 8, but these facilities were never built. After the digital transition on June 12, 2009, KOBG began operating with facilities on channel 12 identical to that of low-power translator stations under special temporary authority, and was formally replaced with a translator (K12QW-D) on April 26, 2011, though its license was not canceled until August 3.

=== Translators ===
In addition, there are several low-power repeaters that carry KOB's programming throughout New Mexico, including the following:

- Caballo: K20HA-D
- Colfax: K30GJ-D
- Datil–Horse Springs: K21OH-D
- Deming: K32NM-D
- Eagle Nest: K18LT-D
- Grants: K36JS-D
- Las Cruces: K22NM-D
- Las Vegas: K23NN-D
- Montoya–Newkirk: K17FK-D
- Mora: K25FI-D
- Raton: K26DX-D
- Romeo, CO: K23NF-D
- Santa Rosa: K36DI-D
- Silver City: K12QW-D
- Socorro: K10MG-D
- Taos: K30KX-D
- Tierra Amarilla: K09KJ-D
- Truth or Consequences: K29LC-D
- Tucumcari: K35FP

== See also ==
- List of three-letter broadcast call signs in the United States
