= Mike Roberts (mixer) =

American mixing engineer (born 1992)

- Born: August 3, 1992 (age 34); Syracuse, New York
- Genres: Pop, dance-pop, indie pop, synthpop, dream pop, hip hop, rock
- Occupations: Mixer, audio engineer
- Years active: 2009-present
- Website: www.mikerobertsaudio.com

Mike Roberts (born August 3, 1992) is an American mixing engineer.

== Early life ==
Born in Syracuse, New York and raised in the suburb of Baldwinsville, Roberts first became interested in music at age 13 after discovering his father's old guitar. While attending high school, Roberts performed at numerous bars, clubs and regional music festivals with his band on a nightly basis, but it was not until he walked into a local recording studio at the age of 16 where he found his passion for engineering.

After an early graduation from high school in 2009, Roberts attended the Berklee College of Music for three semesters before leaving to pursue mixing and audio engineering full-time.

== Career ==
At Berklee, Roberts met producer and songwriter Peter Thomas. After forming an exclusive working relationship with Thomas, the team has worked with a range of notable producers and songwriters.

Roberts has worked with a variety of major and independent label recording artists, including Selena Gomez, Naya Rivera, Neon Hitch, Victoria Justice, Black Cards, Taio Cruz, Anjulie, Gabe Saporta, 3OH!3, Kevin Rudolf, Charice, Iyaz, SafetySuit, Miguel, Rachel Taylor, Mayday Parade, Spose, Elliott Yamin, Parachute, Umphrey's McGee, Goo Goo Dolls, The Derek Trucks Band, and Joe Driscoll.

At the age of 19, Roberts mixed four songs on Hoodie Allen's debut E.P. titled All American. Shortly after its release on April 10, 2012, the album rose to #1 on the iTunes U.S. "Top Albums" chart and debuted at #10 on the Billboard 200.

Select work from Roberts' discography include the single "Gold" by Victoria Justice, and song "Like A Champion" by Selena Gomez from her album Stars Dance which made its debut at #1 on the Billboard200. The album has since been certified gold in multiple countries.

Roberts frequently collaborates with Australian indie-pop artist Betty Who, and mixed Who's debut EP titled The Movement. The EP exclusively premiered on Billboard's homepage and was cited by Popjustice as "2013's best proper EP so far."
