= Sandia View Academy =

Coordinates: 35°14′50.1″N 106°36′20.1″W

- 65 Sandia View Lane; Corrales, NM 87048; United States

Information
- Type: Private, grades 9-12
- Established: 1941
- Principal: Interim Sandra Patterson
- Faculty: 6
- Enrollment: 80 in 2025/2026
- Colors: Navy Blue and Gold
- Website: sandiaviewacademy.org

Sandia View Academy is a private high school in Corrales, New Mexico. It is located in panoramic view of the Sandia Mountains. Sandia View Academy is a seven Albuquerque-area constituent church-run, grades 9 to 12, accredited senior high school in the Texico Conference of the Southwestern Union Conference of the Seventh-day Adventist Church. The school was founded in 1941 and has students from around the ABQ Metro area. Sandia View Academy is accredited through the State of New Mexico's Public Education Department (PED) for private schools, the Adventist Accrediting Association, and the National Association of Private Schools. The Adventist school system is a worldwide network and is recognized as the second-largest parochial school system in the world.

== History ==
Sandia View Academy was established in 1939 as the Spanish-American Seminary and operated by the General Conference to train young men and women of Hispanic origin to serve as workers in the Spanish-speaking areas in the Canada and Latin American countries.

For a time the Spanish-American Seminary operated as a junior college. Spanish-speaking students from almost all the Latin-American countries enrolled, in addition to Hispanic-Americans from California, Colorado, Arizona, Texas, New York, and other areas of the United States.

This was one of four seminaries operated at various times by the church to serve special language groups. The other schools were Clinton Theological Seminary (German); Humpinson Theological Seminary (Danish and Norwegian); and Broadview Seminary (Swedish).

In 1951 the General Conference voted to turn the Spanish-American Seminary property and buildings over to the Texico Conference for adoption as the conference secondary boarding school. Sandia View Academy has been in continuous operation in Corrales as an accredited secondary high school in New Mexico since 1951.

== Religious aspects ==
Sandia View Academy is a Seventh-day Adventist high school. All students take a Bible or Religion class each school year that they are enrolled at SVA. These classes cover topics in biblical history, questions about Biblical authority, Protestant Reformation, Christian and denominational doctrines.

Sandia View Academy students have opportunity to join travelling ministry classes, clubs, and sports' teams. SVA students interact with high school students of many faiths and denominationd thru the local and SDA academic and sports' leagues. Thru the 60s thru to the 80s, Bible Bowls were a big annual competition for SDA high schools in the US. SVA students travelled to Camp Yorktown Bay in Arkansas.

SVA students regularly participate in Mission Trips to other states and countries to help build schools and churches. SVA choir and band groups travel and perform at SDA churches around the Texico Conf of SDAs. Prayer is a regular part of every class and aspect of student life at SVA.

== Academics ==
Sandia View Academy is a college preparatory school. The required honors level curriculum includes classes in the following subject areas: Religion, English, Social Studies, Communication/Business, Physical Education, Health, Computer Science, Fine Arts, and Electives.

== Sports ==
The school has soccer, basketball, volleyball and gymnastics for students. There are out-of-state University sports trips for Gymnastics-Acrofest and for Basketball-Hoops Classic Tournament

== Trips ==
Trips enhance and extend the education opportunities at Sandia View Academy. Current trip opportunities include local trips such as a week long Biology Outdoor Trip, Senior Survival, and field trips as well as out-of-state University trips such as Leadership Camp, University Experience, Music Festival, and Brain Games. Students must maintain grades to be eligible for trips.

== See also ==
- List of Seventh-day Adventist secondary schools
- Seventh-day Adventist education
