= Mike Roberts (sportscaster) =

American sportscaster (1933–2016)

- Born: July 17, 1933; Carthage, Missouri, U.S.
- Died: September 13, 2016 (aged 83); Albuquerque, New Mexico, U.S.
- Occupation: Broadcaster

Mike Roberts (July 17, 1933 – September 13, 2016) was an American radio sportscaster in Albuquerque, New Mexico, where he provided play-by-play for University of New Mexico (UNM) Lobo basketball and football games on KKOB (AM). His career in New Mexico is unparalleled as a long time (1966-2013) Albuquerque sports announcer on TV and radio for local news, professional baseball, college football & basketball, and high school sports broadcasts.

Roberts began broadcasting Lobo football games in 1966 and Lobo basketball games in 1968, becoming known along the way as "the Voice of the Lobos". For years he hosted The Mike Roberts Show and the UNM coaches shows on KKOB and was the sports anchor on KOB-TV Channel 4, the NBC affiliate in Albuquerque.

Roberts has also called games for the minor league baseball teams, the Albuquerque Dukes and the Albuquerque Isotopes, as well as numerous other local sports events.

When KKOB-AM 770 announced it was replacing Roberts on the popular sports show Lobo Talk in 2003, fans of the show were so outraged that some threatened to boycott the sports bar where it is broadcast. In actuality, it was a joint decision by UNM and their new sports broadcasting partner, Learfield Sports.

Born in Missouri and a St. Louis Cardinals baseball fan since he was a child, Roberts began his broadcasting career in Atmore, Alabama, at WATM (now WNRP) in December 1951, making stops from Key West, Florida, to Laramie, Wyoming, before becoming a fixture in Albuquerque radio. He died at an assisted living center in Albuquerque on September 13, 2016, at the age of 83 from cancer.

== Awards and honors ==
In 1999, Roberts was named as an inductee to the UNM Athletic Hall of Honor by the UNM Alumni Lettermen's Association and received its Distinguished Service Award.

New Mexico governor Bill Richardson declared May 8, 2008, as "Mike Roberts Appreciation Day" throughout the state.
