= Mike Roberts (rugby union, born 1946) =

British Lions & Wales international rugby union player

Michael Gordon Roberts (born 20 February 1946 (age 79)) is a former Wales international rugby union player. He attended Ruthin School. In 1971 he toured New Zealand with the British & Irish Lions and at the time played club rugby for London Welsh RFC.
