= KRZY (AM) =

Radio station in Albuquerque, New Mexico

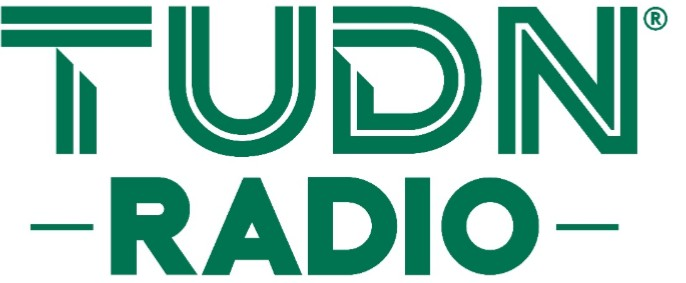
- Albuquerque, New Mexico; United States
- Frequency: 1450 kHz
- Branding: TUDN Radio Albuquerque

Programming
- Language: Spanish
- Format: Sports

Ownership
- Owner: Entravision Communications; (Entravision Holdings, LLC)
- Sister stations: KRZY-FM

History
- First air date: May 9, 1956
- Former call signs: KLOS (1956–1964)

Technical information
- Licensing authority: FCC
- Facility ID: 12634
- Class: C
- Power: 1,000 watts unlimited
- Transmitter coordinates: 35°07′56″N 106°37′18″W

Links
- Public license information: Public file; LMS
- Website: www.tudn.com

KRZY (1450 AM) is a radio station licensed to Albuquerque, New Mexico, United States, serving the Albuquerque metropolitan area. The station is owned by Entravision Communications. KRZY broadcasts a Spanish-language sports format.

== History ==
=== Early years as KLOS ===
On February 24, 1956, E. Boyd Whitney and D. K. McGregor, doing business as B and M Broadcasters, obtained a construction permit for a new radio station at 1450 kHz in Albuquerque, which would broadcast with 250 watts. With a country music format, KLOS began broadcasting on May 9. Ownership shifted several times in the station's first few years on the air, and by 1960, the station was owned by Whitney and George Oliver.

=== Going KRZY ===
On August 2, 1964, Whitney and Oliver's KLOS—by this point airing Top 40—traded frequencies and facilities with KRZY, a country music station owned by Burroughs Broadcasting, a company owned by former governor John Burroughs. For $50,500, Burroughs paid to move KRZY's programming from 1580 kHz to 1450 kHz, where it could broadcast at night; KLOS became a daytime-only station on 1580.

In its first fall on 1450 kHz, KRZY got into a heated dispute over the rights to broadcast University of New Mexico football games. After KRZY had broadcast coverage of a game against the University of Utah, the UNM Board of Regents had awarded an exclusive three-year contract for Lobos football and basketball to KOB—a move KRZY contested, claiming that, as a public institution, the university could not award exclusive rights to cover games. Undeterred, station manager Ray Moran and a salesman traveled to Provo, where the Lobos would play the BYU Cougars. Moran and a salesman set up shop in a nearby motel, while the announcers—one wearing a BYU sweatshirt and sitting in the BYU student section—brought equipment, covered by a blanket, into the stadium and relayed their commentary using wireless microphones to the motel, where it was sent by telephone back to Albuquerque. In response, the university and KOB obtained an order against the station, blocking it from any further game broadcasts.

Beyond the controversial football broadcasts, Burrough set out to improve the new KRZY. A new circular studio building was constructed at 2401 Quincy NE late in 1964, and a companion FM station, KRST 92.3, was launched the next year, from a transmitter atop Sandia Crest. While KRST changed formats to album-oriented rock in 1968, KRZY remained a country station throughout the late 1960s and 1970s, adding CBS Radio programming in 1974. By Burroughs's death in 1978, KRZY and KRST were his last remaining radio properties.

=== Ratings decline and sales ===
In 1980, at the height of the "Urban Cowboy" trend, Burroughs flipped KRST to country. KRZY differentiated itself from its FM sister by playing a more traditional mix of country music. KRZY's ratings steadily slid during the course of the decade, going from a 6.4 percent share of the market in 1980 to a 2.4 in 1987—even as KRST became one of the market's top radio stations.

It was not until 1987, nearly a decade after the death of John Burroughs, that Burroughs Broadcasting sold KRZY and KRST to Wagontrain Communications, owner of the Drake-Chenault syndication company, acquiring the pair for $5.25 million. Wagontrain owned the stations for a year, selling them for $8.1 million to Commonwealth Broadcasting of San Diego in late 1988.

=== "The Sports Animal" ===
After 30 years of country music on 1450 AM, a new format launched on the frequency in 1994. The station became known as "Sports Radio 1450 AM" and added several new sports talk programs and Colorado Rockies baseball. On July 1, the station went all-sports and adopted a now-familiar moniker in Albuquerque radio: "The Sports Animal". In addition to several local shows, KRZY was the Albuquerque home for Imus in the Morning and Jim Rome; the station made an attempt to pursue UNM athletics rights, which were still held by KOB.

Rapid consolidation in the broadcasting industry in the mid-1990s would see KRZY get several new owners. In 1995, Commonwealth sold its two Albuquerque stations and an FM outlet in the Las Vegas market to Crescent Communications for $25.73 million. In 1996, Citadel Communications acquired Crescent's three New Mexico properties—KRZY, KRST, and KRZY-FM 105.9—in a $23 million transaction. For Citadel, the prize was KRST, which had become Albuquerque's top-rated and top-billing station in the 1990s. Citadel did not want or need KRZY-AM-FM, and it could not keep them, because KRST alone pushed the company past the eight-station limit in the Albuquerque market, and at least one FM needed to be divested.

=== Spanish-language era ===
Citadel's immediate spin-off of KRZY-AM-FM brought as its buyer EXCL Communications of California, marking its first purchase of broadcasting properties in the state of New Mexico. EXCL programmed exclusively Spanish-language stations and immediately announced plans to flip its purchases to Hispanic-oriented formats. Citadel retained the Sports Animal format and name and moved it to KHFN (1050 AM), which changed call letters to KNML, on October 9, 1996.

When EXCL took over, KRZY AM became "Radio Tricolor", airing a Regional Mexican format. Entravision acquired EXCL in 2000. In 2002, Radio Tricolor moved to KRZY-FM, and KRZY AM took on a Spanish oldies format as "La Consentida". The 2002 format changes also brought with them more extensive use of satellite-fed formats from Entravision, replacing local DJs and news updates. The station then shifted to "Radio Visa", a talk-based format.

In 2005, KRZY AM was one of five Entravision stations that adopted the then-new José format, a Spanish-language version of adult hits. "La Tricolor" returned to 1450 in November 2008, when the station swapped formats with KRZY-FM, and was replaced three years later with ESPN Deportes Radio, including Spanish-language play-by-play of UNM athletics.

In September 2019, with the looming shutdown of the ESPN Deportes Radio network, all six of its Entravision-owned affiliates flipped to José—the brand having been recycled for a format of norteño and ranchera music. KRZY has since returned to Spanish-language sports programming with programming from TUDN Radio as of August 2020.
