= KAYW =

Simulcasting KZKS Rifle
- Meeker, Colorado; United States
- Frequency: 98.1 MHz
- Branding: Drive 105

Programming
- Format: Classic rock

Ownership
- Owner: Western Slope Communications, LLC

History
- First air date: 2000

Technical information
- Licensing authority: FCC
- Facility ID: 84266
- Class: C0
- ERP: 100,000 watts
- HAAT: 349 meters
- Transmitter coordinates: 40°11′45″N 107°56′0″W
- Translator: 106.1 K291CA (Craig)

Links
- Public license information: Public file; LMS
- Website: KAYW Online

KAYW (98.1 FM, "The Drive") is a radio station licensed to serve Meeker, Colorado, United States. The station is owned by Western Slope Communications, LLC.

KAYW broadcasts a classic rock music format, simulcasting KZKS 105.3 FM Rifle, Colorado.

The station was assigned the KAYW call sign by the Federal Communications Commission on December 8, 1997.
