= KRST =

Radio station in Albuquerque, New Mexico

Coordinates: 35.215°N 106.451°W

- Albuquerque, New Mexico; United States
- Broadcast area: Albuquerque metropolitan area
- Frequency: 92.3 MHz
- Branding: 92.3 KRST

Programming
- Format: Country
- Affiliations: Westwood One

Ownership
- Owner: Cumulus Media; (Radio License Holding CBC, LLC)
- Sister stations: KDRF, KKOB, KKOB-FM, KMGA, KNML, KOBQ, KTBL

History
- First air date: September 16, 1965
- Call sign meaning: Sandia Crest, its transmitter site

Technical information
- Licensing authority: FCC
- Facility ID: 12584
- Class: C
- ERP: 22,000 watts
- HAAT: 1,268 meters (4,160 ft)

Links
- Public license information: Public file; LMS
- Webcast: Listen Live
- Website: 923krst.com

KRST (92.3 FM) is a commercial radio station in Albuquerque, New Mexico. It is owned by Cumulus Media and airs a country music radio format. The radio studios and offices are located in Downtown Albuquerque.

KRST has an effective radiated power (ERP) of 22,000 watts. The transmitter tower is atop Sandia Crest east of the city. The call sign KRST represents the word "Crest", substituting a K for the C and omitting the E.

== History ==
=== Progressive rock ===
On September 16, 1965, KRST first signed on the air. It was owned by Burroughs Broadcasting, along with KRZY (1450 AM), then a country music station. KRST had separate programming from its AM counterpart, playing a free form progressive rock format beginning in the summer of 1970.

Over time, KRST moved from its freeform format to a more structured album rock format, playing the most popular tracks from top-selling rock albums.

=== Country ===
With the release of the 1980 hit movie Urban Cowboy, many FM stations around the U.S. were considering switching to country music, which was gaining acceptance outside rural communities. Since co-owned AM station KRZY had been playing a more traditional country format, management decided to put a modern country format on KRST. In the early 1980s, the station made the switch. Albuquerque radio listeners made KRST one of the market's highest rated FM stations.

In 1996, Citadel Broadcasting acquired KRST and KRZY. (KRZY has since been spun off to Entravision Broadcasting.) Citadel was later merged into current owner Cumulus Media.

==== Nash FM ====
On May 30, 2014, Cumulus Media expanded the "Nash FM" brand to Albuquerque, as KRST rebranded as "Nash FM 92.3". The conversion of KRST to Nash was part of Cumulus' plans to have their Country outlets adopt a national based brand using a combination of syndicated and local content, similar to Clear Channel Communications' Top 40/CHR "Kiss-FM" model. The conversion also resulted in several KRST air staffers (except for Juan Velasco) being let go, including "The Get Up Gang" morning show.

After five years, Cumulus rebranded the station back to "92.3 KRST" in June 2019.
