= KWGL =

- Ouray, Colorado; United States
- Frequency: 105.7 MHz
- Branding: The Range

Programming
- Format: Classic country

Ownership
- Owner: WS Communications, LLC

History
- First air date: February 28, 1985
- Former call signs: KURA (1985–1999)

Technical information
- Licensing authority: FCC
- Facility ID: 58856
- Class: C
- ERP: 60,000 watts
- HAAT: 534 meters (1,752 ft)
- Transmitter coordinates: 38°23′16″N 107°40′28″W

Links
- Public license information: Public file; LMS
- Website: wscradio.net/general-4-1

KWGL (105.7 FM, "The Range") is a radio station broadcasting a classic country music format. Licensed to Ouray, Colorado, United States, the station is owned by WS Communications, LLC.

== History ==
The station was assigned the call letters KURA on February 28, 1985. On March 1, 1999, the station changed its call sign to the current KWGL.

Former logo
