= KOBQ =

Contemporary hit radio station in Albuquerque, New Mexico, United States

Coordinates: 35.212°N 106.450°W

- Albuquerque, New Mexico; United States
- Broadcast area: Albuquerque metropolitan area
- Frequency: 93.3 MHz
- Branding: 93-3 The Q

Programming
- Format: Top 40 (CHR)
- Affiliations: Westwood One; KOAT-TV (weather)

Ownership
- Owner: Cumulus Media; (Radio License Holding CBC, LLC)
- Sister stations: KDRF; KKOB; KKOB-FM; KMGA; KNML; KRST; KTBL

History
- First air date: August 1, 1967 (as KOB-FM)
- Former call signs: KOB-FM (1967–1986); KKOB-FM (1986–2019)

Technical information
- Facility ID: 11250
- Class: C
- ERP: 21,500 watts
- HAAT: 1,265 meters (4,150 ft)

Links
- Webcast: Listen live
- Website: 933theq.com

KOBQ (93.3 FM) is a commercial radio station in Albuquerque, New Mexico. It is owned by Cumulus Media and broadcasts a top 40 (CHR) radio format, branded as "93-3 The Q". Its radio studios and offices are in Downtown Albuquerque.

KOBQ has an effective radiated power (ERP) of 21,500 watts. The transmitter is atop Sandia Peak.

== History ==
=== Beautiful music ===
In 1964, Hubbard Broadcasting Inc. applied to the Federal Communications Commission (FCC) for a construction permit to build a new FM radio station to operate alongside KOB and KOB-TV. The FM station was originally planned to begin broadcasting by Fall of that year with an antenna erected on the AM tower, and was slated to simulcast the AM programming. It signed on the air on August 14, 1967, as KOB-FM.

Instead of simulcasting KOB, KOB-FM featured a completely automated format, operating from 6:30 a.m. to midnight. It played "modern, stereophonic music performed by the top recording artists of the day". Selections included "bright uptempo sounds" in the morning. Jazz and light classical music were heard in the evenings. KOB-FM was the first station to broadcast from atop Sandia Crest. The broadcast range at the time was determined to be about 150 miles (240 km). Management stated: "The decision to program from the transmitter atop the mountain stems from the fact that stereophonic programming material relayed to a transmitter via microwave results in a reproduction of lower sound quality". From the late 1960s until 1981, KOB-FM carried a beautiful music format, still largely automated.

=== Adult contemporary ===
August 1981 saw a shift in programming, as KOB-FM changed to an adult contemporary format. KOB-FM became one of the highest rated FM stations throughout the 1980s. New FM competitors began broadcasting, but KOB-FM continued to dominate the market for many years.

In October 1986, Hubbard sold KOB-AM-FM to Price Communications for $16.5 million. The call letters were changed to KKOB-FM with no changes in programming. The stations were later acquired by Fairmont Communications. Fairmont sold both stations to Citadel Communications in late 1993 for $9 million. Citadel would also acquire KMGA, which had a soft AC format, which created an FM duopoly of KKOB-FM and KMGA. The acquisition prompted KKOB-FM to pick up the tempo and become a hot adult contemporary station.

=== Top 40 and 1980s hits ===
KKOB-FM's first shift to mainstream Top 40 came in 1999. It started using the slogan "Today's Best Music", rivaling the newly launched KCHQ-FM, "Channel 105.1", which returned the top 40 format to the market after a six-year absence. Both stations were often head-to-head in the ratings until November 2000, when KCHQ shifted to a 1980s hits format.

In January 2001, KKOB-FM also switched to a 1980s format, putting the two stations in competition once again. KKSS, which had been facing a fierce rhythmic contemporary battle with KYLZ-FM, become the area's mainstream Top 40 outlet a few weeks later. In November 2002, KKSS was sold to Hispanic Broadcasting Corporation and returned to Rhythmic Top 40. KCHQ had dropped the 1980s format in the fall of 2001, but the format continued to lose steam on KKOB-FM. On December 25, 2002, KKOB-FM returned to the Top 40 format and once again was using the three-letter "KOB" identification in its branding.

=== KOBQ ===
On November 15, 2019, "93.3 KOB FM" rebranded as "93.3 The Q", using a new call sign KOBQ, but with no change in format. The change was made in part to avoid confusion with sister station KKOB AM, who recently added an FM translator at 94.5 MHz. The KKOB-FM call letters were reassigned to 96.3 FM (formerly KBZU) on January 6, 2020, when that station began simulcasting the news/talk format of KKOB.
