= KKOB (AM) =

Radio station in Albuquerque, New Mexico

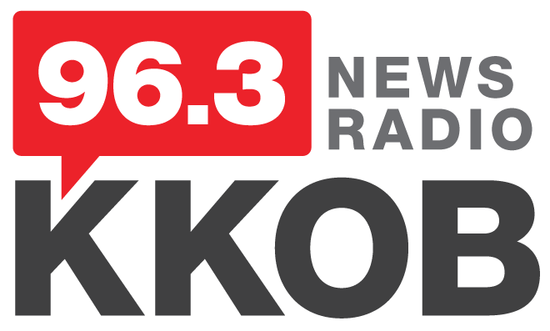
- Albuquerque, New Mexico; Experimental synchronous operation: Santa Fe, New Mexico; United States
- Broadcast area: Albuquerque metropolitan area
- Frequency: 770 kHz
- Branding: 96.3 Newsradio KKOB

Programming
- Format: News/Talk
- Affiliations: ABC News Radio; Premiere Networks; Westwood One; New Mexico Lobos

Ownership
- Owner: Cumulus Media; (Radio License Holding CBC, LLC)
- Sister stations: KDRF; KKOB-FM; KOBQ; KMGA; KNML; KRST; KTBL

History
- First air date: April 5, 1922; 104 years ago (as KOB, in State College (Las Cruces), moved to Albuquerque in 1932)
- Former call signs: KOB (1922–1986)
- Call sign meaning: Extra "K" to original, randomly assigned, call sign of KOB

Technical information
- Licensing authority: FCC
- Facility ID: 11251
- Class: B; D (experimental synchronous operation in Santa Fe)
- Power: 50,000 watts; 230 watts day and night (experimental synchronous operation in Santa Fe)
- Transmitter coordinates: 35°12′9.2″N 106°36′43.1″W; 35°40′56.1″N 105°58′23.1″W (experimental synchronous operation in Santa Fe)
- Repeater: 96.3 KKOB-FM (Albuquerque)

Links
- Public license information: Public file; LMS
- Webcast: Listen live
- Website: www.newsradiokkob.com

KKOB (770 kHz) is a commercial radio station, licensed to Albuquerque, New Mexico, and owned by Cumulus Media. Its news/talk format is branded "96.3 Newsradio KKOB", reflecting a simulcast with co-owned KKOB-FM. The station's studios and offices are located in Downtown Albuquerque. KKOB is the oldest station in New Mexico and is the state's primary entry point for the Emergency Alert System.

KKOB's transmitter site is off Second Street NW in North Valley. It is a Class B facility, operating around the clock with 50,000 watts, the maximum allowed in the United States by the Federal Communications Commission (FCC). During the daytime, it uses a non-directional signal that reaches most of New Mexico's populated areas, as well as parts of Colorado and Arizona. At night, it uses a directional antenna, primarily to limit its signal to the east in the direction of WABC in New York City, the primary class A station on 770 AM. Even with this restriction, it can be heard across most of the western half of North America with a good radio. To compensate for KKOB's weaker nighttime signal in Santa Fe, since 1986, it has been simulcast on 770 kHz by a 230-watt experimental synchronous transmitter located in that city.

== Programming ==
=== News and talk ===
KKOB-AM-FM provide local news and weather updates around the clock, traffic "on the 7's" and national news updates from ABC News Radio. On weekdays, the schedule features mostly local talk shows including Bob Clark in morning drive time, Brandon Vogt middays, TJ Trout afternoons and Eric Strauss in the evening. The rest of the schedule is nationally syndicated talk radio programs: The Vince Show with Vince Coglianese, The Mark Levin Show, Red Eye Radio and America in The Morning.

Weekends include shows on money, health, home repair, gardening, cars, pets, travel, and technology, some of which are paid brokered programming. Terry Travis hosts a local talk show on weekend mornings. Syndicated programs on weekends include The Chris Plante Show, World Travel with Rudy Maxa and Sunday Nights with Bill Cunningham.

=== Sports ===
KKOB broadcasts University of New Mexico Lobos basketball and football games. Some other Lobo sports can also be heard on co-owned sports radio station KNML 610 AM.

== History ==
=== Early years ===
The station began as KOB, first licensed by the federal government on April 5, 1922. However, the person most responsible for its founding, Ralph Willis Goddard, by this time already had extensive experience with radio. Goddard was the dean of the Engineering School at New Mexico College Of Agriculture And Mechanic Arts (now New Mexico State University). It was located in State College, New Mexico, near Las Cruces. (Note: After the college became New Mexico State University, State College became University Park, New Mexico, in 1959.) Goddard headed the school's Radio Club, and in the spring of 1920, arranged for the university to be issued a license for an experimental radio station, which was issued the call sign 5XD. In addition to experimental work, this station was used for such things as reporting sport scores. Eventually the station expanded from its initial Morse code transmissions to audio programs, including entertainment broadcasts.

Initially, there were no formal standards for radio stations making broadcasts intended for the general public. However, effective December 1, 1921, the United States Department of Commerce, which supervised radio at this time, issued a regulation requiring that stations making broadcasts intended for the general public now had to operate under a "Limited Commercial" license. On April 5, 1922, the university was issued a broadcasting station license with the randomly assigned call letters KOB.

The 1928 passage of the Davis Amendment required an equitable assignment of radio facilities within 5 regions of the United States. Effective November 11, 1928, as part of a major reassignment of stations under the Federal Radio Commission's General Order 40, KOB was assigned to 1180 kHz, one of Region 5's high-powered "clear channel" frequencies. Although this allowed unlimited operation during daylight hours, nighttime hours were shared with KEX in Portland, Oregon, with KOB receiving 1/3rd of the after-sunset hours, and KEX assigned the rest.

On December 31, 1929, while preparing the transmitter for a New Year's Eve broadcast, Goddard was instantly killed when he came into contact with high voltage equipment. In 1932, the station reduced its power from 20 to 10 kilowatts due to transmitter issues.

=== Albuquerque Journal ownership ===
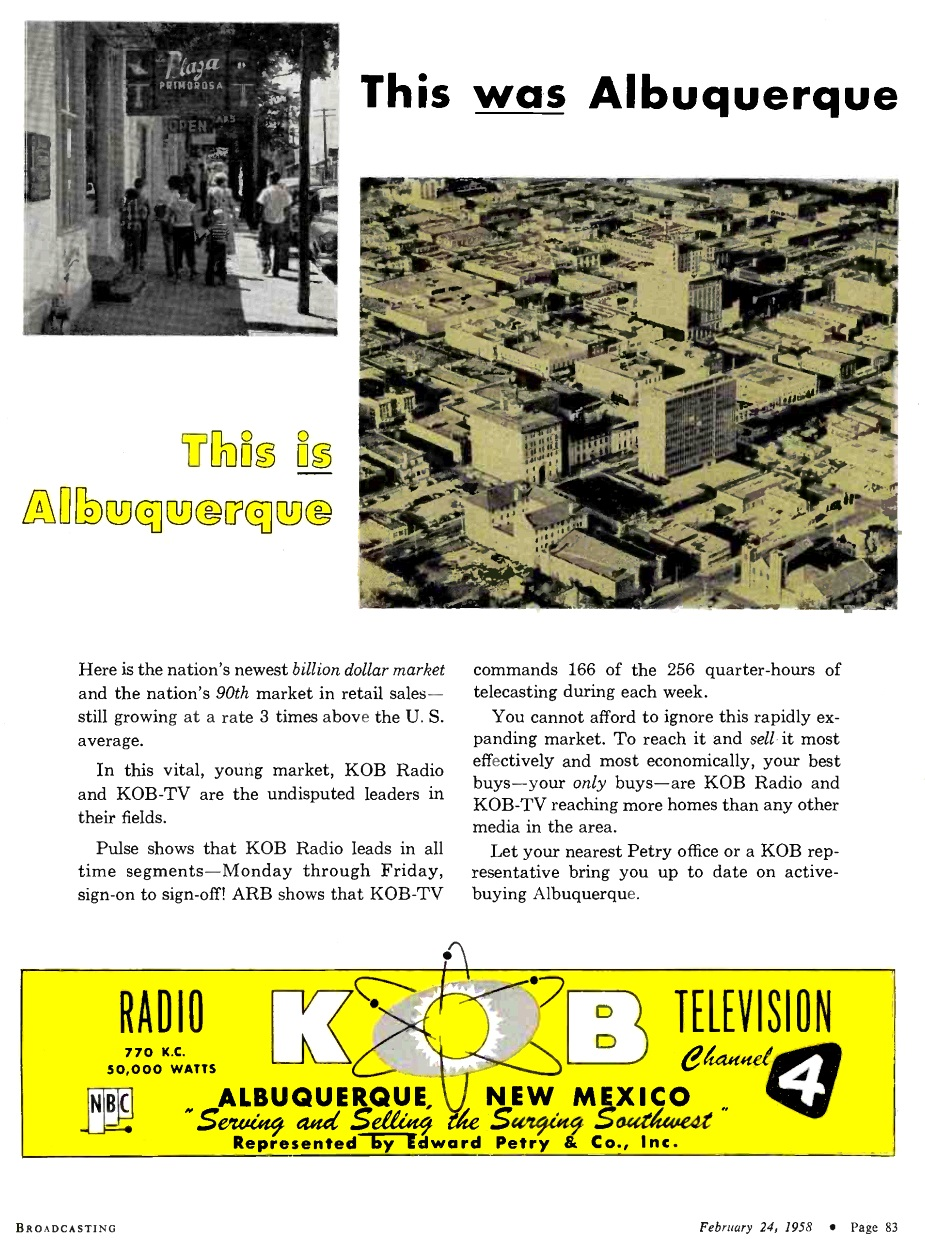
1958 advertisement for KOB (AM) and KOB-TV.

In 1932, the university arranged for KOB to be leased by the Albuquerque Journal, which later purchased the station. KOB's last State College broadcast was on April 24, and it resumed broadcasting that fall in Albuquerque. KOB was an NBC Red Network affiliate, carrying its schedule of dramas, comedies, news, sports, soap operas, game shows, and big band broadcasts during the "Golden Age of Radio".

In 1940, KOB's timesharing partner, KEX, moved to 1160 kHz, which allowed KOB to expand its nighttime operating hours to unlimited. In March 1941, a nationwide frequency reassignment took place with the implementation of the North American Regional Broadcasting Agreement (NARBA). Initially, KOB was assigned to 1030 kHz. WBZ in Boston, Massachusetts, was the primary station assigned to 1030 kHz; moreover, it employed a directional antenna that strengthened its signal toward the west. The resulting excessive nighttime interference between WBZ and KOB caused the FCC to reassign KOB to 770 kHz. However, WJZ (now WABC) in New York City was also assigned to 770 kHz, and this led to a series of legal battles between the two stations over nighttime coverage that would last for decades.

In 1948, Tom Pepperday, owner and publisher of the Journal, signed on KOB-TV, the first television station between the Mississippi River and the West Coast. The stations were acquired by Time Life in 1952. In 1957, they were sold to Hubbard Broadcasting, Inc. On August 1, 1967, KOB-FM (now KOBQ) first signed on. At first, it simulcast KOB, but soon began its own format of beautiful music, and in the 1980s, switched to adult contemporary music.

=== Separation of KOB radio and KOB-TV ===
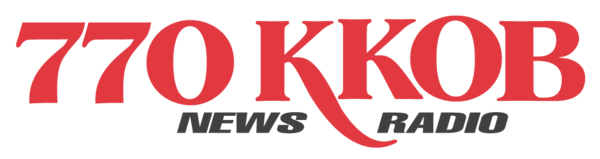
KKOB logo as an AM only station

Logo from 2016 to 2020, when KKOB was simulcast on translator station K233CG at 94.5 FM

Hubbard Broadcasting sold KOB AM and FM to Southwest Radio in 1986. At the time, FCC regulations stated that stations could not share call signs if they were not co-owned, so with Hubbard keeping the TV station as KOB-TV, Southwest had to find new call letters for the radio stations. To continue trading on the well-known KOB calls and their 64-year legacy in the state, a leading "K" was appended, becoming KKOB and KKOB-FM on October 28. Despite their separate ownership, KKOB still has a news partnership with KOB-TV.

In 1994, KKOB AM and FM were sold to Citadel Broadcasting for $7.8 million. In 2011, Citadel was acquired by the station's current owner, Cumulus Media. Under Cumulus ownership, some shows syndicated by Premiere Networks were dropped, such as Coast-to-Coast AM and Sean Hannity, because Premiere is owned by Cumulus rival iHeartMedia. KKOB switched to mostly airing programs syndicated by Cumulus Media's Westwood One subsidiary, only retaining one Premiere Networks weekday show, Rush Limbaugh until his death in 2021. Dan Bongino took over the midday time slot previously held by Limbaugh on all Cumulus stations on May 24, 2021.

On September 1, 2016, KKOB began simulcasting its programming over translator station K233CG (94.5 FM) in Sandia, which Cumulus purchased for $425,000.

=== Legal dispute with WABC ===
Beginning in 1941, KOB was involved in a 38-year-long dispute over the use of the 770 kHz frequency with New York City station WABC (originally WJZ), a Class I-A clear-channel station. In 1978, the FCC noted that "No other station assignment among the thousands so far established has approached this one in the length, complexity, and thoroughness of the consideration that has been accorded in adjudicatory and rulemaking proceedings before the Commission, and in repeated judicial reviews."

In March 1941, with the implementation of the North American Regional Broadcasting Agreement (NARBA), most of the original "clear channel" stations were reassigned to comparable authorizations. The FCC attempted to give KOB an assignment that would allow it to use high power to serve a large area of the underserved southwestern United States. KOB's initial 1941 NARBA assignment was for operation on 1030 kHz. However, another high-powered station, WBZ in Boston, Massachusetts, was also assigned to this frequency; moreover, WBZ employed a directional antenna that strengthened its signal westward. The resulting nighttime interference between WBZ and KOB caused the FCC, beginning later in 1941, to reassign KOB to 770 kHz with the first of a series of temporary Special Service Authorizations.

The joint assignment of KOB and WABC to 770 kHz still resulted in interference over large areas of the middle of the country. The FCC later concluded that KOB and WABC should have equal status on 770 kHz as "Class I-B" stations, with both required to protect the nighttime coverage of the other station, and ordered that KOB and WJZ both install directional antennas. KOB constructed the required nighttime directional antenna, but WABC refused to comply, appealing the order in the courts. WABC's challenge was successful, primarily on the grounds that downgrading its coverage left its ABC network at a disadvantage compared to the other two national networks' New York City stations, CBS's WCBS and NBC's WNBC, which were non-directional operations. The FCC then reclassified KOB as a "Class II-A" station, and its directional antenna was modified to further reduce its signal toward WABC.

=== Hot air balloon accidents ===
On October 10, 2004, a Smokey Bear special shape hot air balloon participating in the Albuquerque International Balloon Fiesta collided with and became entangled in one of KKOB's transmitter towers. The three passengers were able to climb out of the basket onto the tower. However, the tower was energized and could have led to electrocution once the passengers set foot on ground, so KKOB shut down its transmitter following the accident to enable them to climb down to safety. This accident was recorded by several local television stations, and the footage has become a standard story on a number of televised reality programs which deal with "caught on camera" incidents.

On October 11, 2024, a hot air balloon participating in the Albuquerque International Balloon Fiesta hit the north tower and caused it to collapse. The balloon was able to land safely and no injuries were reported.

== Awards ==
KKOB has been awarded four Marconi Awards from the National Association of Broadcasters – one in 1997, "Talk Station of the Year" in 2001, "Medium Market Station of the Year" in 2009 and "Legendary Station" in 2010. The station has received 13 nominations. KKOB was awarded "Station Of The Year" honors from Radio & Records magazine in 2009. From the New Mexico Broadcasters Association the station has received numerous awards including "Station of the Year" 13 times since 2000.

== Former personalities ==
- Larry Ahrens, mornings 1980–2004
- Jim 'Noochie' Villanucci, afternoons 1999 – February 28, 2013
- Billy "Fatback" Cornelius, evenings 2013–2014
- Terrie Q. Sayre, weekends 2007–2015, died on January 22, 2015
- Mike Roberts, voice of University of New Mexico football and basketball games on KKOB from 1966 until 2007. Also did the morning sports news for many years, and broadcast Albuquerque Dukes games on KKOB for many years. Died in September 2016.
- Pat Frisch, former program director who had done mornings and middays, left station in June 2019.
- Scott Stiegler, afternoon host from 2013 to 2019 now works in the sales department.

== See also ==
- List of initial AM-band station grants in the United States
