= KCVS =

- Salina, Kansas; United States
- Broadcast area: Salina, Kansas; McPherson, Kansas; Abilene, Kansas
- Frequency: 91.7 MHz

Programming
- Format: Christian Radio
- Network: VCY America

Ownership
- Owner: VCY America; (VCY America, Inc.)

History
- First air date: 1994
- Call sign meaning: Christian Youth's Voice of Salina

Technical information
- Licensing authority: FCC
- Facility ID: 49184
- Class: C2
- ERP: 11,500 watts
- HAAT: 228 meters (748 ft)
- Transmitter coordinates: 38°39′58″N 97°41′31″W

Links
- Public license information: Public file; LMS
- Webcast: Listen live
- Website: vcyamerica.org

KCVS is a Christian radio station licensed to Salina, Kansas, broadcasting on 91.7 MHz. The station serves the areas of Salina, Kansas, McPherson, Kansas, and Abilene, Kansas, and is owned by VCY America.

== Programming ==
KCVS's programming includes Christian Talk and Teaching programming including; Crosstalk, Worldview Weekend with Brannon Howse, Grace to You with John MacArthur, In Touch with Dr. Charles Stanley, Love Worth Finding with Adrian Rogers, Revive Our Hearts with Nancy Leigh DeMoss, The Alternative with Tony Evans, Liberty Council's Faith and Freedom Report, Thru the Bible with J. Vernon McGee, Joni and Friends, Unshackled!, and Moody Radio's Stories of Great Christians.

KCVS also airs a variety of vocal and instrumental traditional Christian Music, as well as children's programming such as Ranger Bill.

== History ==
The station began broadcasting in 1994. The station was owned by North Central Kansas Broadcasting and aired a religious format that was previously heard on KCVS 104.9. In 1997, the station was sold to VCY America for $260,000.

== See also ==
- VCY America
- Vic Eliason
- List of VCY America Radio Stations
