= WPTH =

- Olney, Illinois; United States
- Frequency: 88.1 MHz

Programming
- Format: Christian Radio
- Network: VCY America

Ownership
- Owner: VCY America; (VCY America, Inc.)

History
- First air date: July 1992
- Call sign meaning: With Praise To Him

Technical information
- Licensing authority: FCC
- Facility ID: 50292
- Class: A
- ERP: 2,900 watts
- HAAT: 61 meters (200 ft)
- Transmitter coordinates: 38°41′50″N 88°02′13″W

Links
- Public license information: Public file; LMS
- Webcast: Listen live
- Website: vcyamerica.org

WPTH is a Christian radio station licensed to Olney, Illinois, broadcasting on 88.1 MHz. The station is owned by VCY America.

== Programming ==
WPTH's programming includes Christian Talk and Teaching programming including; Crosstalk, Worldview Weekend with Brannon Howse, Grace to You with John MacArthur, In Touch with Dr. Charles Stanley, Love Worth Finding with Adrian Rogers, Revive Our Hearts with Nancy Leigh DeMoss, The Alternative with Tony Evans, Liberty Council's Faith and Freedom Report, Thru the Bible with J. Vernon McGee, Joni and Friends, Unshackled!, and Moody Radio's Stories of Great Christians.

WPTH also airs a variety of vocal and instrumental traditional Christian Music, as well as children's programming such as Ranger Bill.

== History ==
The station began broadcasting in July 1992. The station was owned by Olney Voice of Christian Faith and aired a Christian format. In 2011, the station was donated to VCY America.

== See also ==
- VCY America
- Vic Eliason
- List of VCY America Radio Stations
