= WVCX =

Coordinates: 43°51′10″N 90°27′36″W

- Tomah, Wisconsin; United States
- Broadcast area: La Crosse - Wisconsin Dells - Wisconsin Rapids
- Frequency: 98.9 MHz

Programming
- Format: Christian radio
- Network: VCY America

Ownership
- Owner: VCY America; (VCY America, Inc.)

History
- First air date: January 29, 1965
- Former call signs: WTMB-FM (1965–1984)

Technical information
- Licensing authority: FCC
- Facility ID: 73061
- Class: C0
- ERP: 100,000 watts horizontal; 24,500 watts vertical
- HAAT: 300 meters (980 ft)

Links
- Public license information: Public file; LMS
- Webcast: Listen live
- Website: vcyamerica.org

WVCX is a Christian radio station licensed to Tomah, Wisconsin, broadcasting on 98.9 FM. WVCX is also heard on translators W216BL 91.1 in McFarland, Wisconsin; covering the Madison area, K208FO 89.5 in Prairie du Chien, Wisconsin, and W275CH 102.9 in Ripon, Wisconsin. The station is owned by VCY America.

== Programming ==
WVCX's programming includes Christian Talk and Teaching programming including; Crosstalk, Worldview Weekend with Brannon Howse, Grace to You with John MacArthur, In Touch with Dr. Charles Stanley, Love Worth Finding with Adrian Rogers, Revive Our Hearts with Nancy Leigh DeMoss, The Alternative with Tony Evans, Liberty Council's Faith and Freedom Report, Thru the Bible with J. Vernon McGee, Joni and Friends, Unshackled!, and Moody Radio's Stories of Great Christians.

WVCX also airs a variety of vocal and instrumental traditional Christian Music, as well as children's programming such as Ranger Bill.

== History ==
The station began broadcasting on January 29, 1965, holding the call sign WTMB-FM. It was owned by The Tomah-Mauston Broadcasting Company. In the 1960s, it simulcast WTMB from dawn until 2 p.m. It broadcast in FM stereo with an easy listening format, and was the largest easy listening FM station in Wisconsin. In the 1970s, the station aired a MOR format, as a partial simulcast with WTMB. In the early 1980s, its simulcast ended, and it aired MOR music, talk, and farm programming independently.

In 1984, the station was sold to Wisconsin Voice of Christian Youth for $465,000. It adopted its current Christian format, and its call sign was changed to WVCX.

== Translators ==
Call sign	Frequency	City of license	FID	ERP (W)	HAAT	Class	FCC info
W216BL	91.1 FM	McFarland, Wisconsin	91912	120	30 m (98 ft)	D	LMS
K208FO	89.5 FM	Prairie du Chien, Wisconsin	122213	205	19.6 m (64 ft)	D	LMS
W275CH	102.9 FM	Ripon, Wisconsin	56488	13	96 m (315 ft)	D	LMS

== See also ==
- Vic Eliason
