= KVCX =

- Gregory, South Dakota; United States
- Broadcast area: Southern South Dakota - Northern Nebraska
- Frequency: 101.5 MHz

Programming
- Format: Christian Radio
- Network: VCY America

Ownership
- Owner: VCY America; (VCY America, Inc.)

History
- First air date: May 8, 1982
- Former call signs: KKSD (1982–1987)
- Call sign meaning: Voice of Christian Youth

Technical information
- Licensing authority: FCC
- Facility ID: 73060
- Class: C1
- ERP: 100,000 watts
- HAAT: 195 meters (640 ft)
- Transmitter coordinates: 43°7′41″N 99°26′1″W

Links
- Public license information: Public file; LMS
- Webcast: Listen to VCY America Live
- Website: vcyamerica.org

KVCX is a Christian radio station licensed to Gregory, South Dakota, broadcasting on 101.5 FM, and serving southern South Dakota and northern Nebraska. The station is owned by VCY America, Inc.

== Programming ==
KVCX's programming includes Christian Talk and Teaching programming including; Crosstalk, Worldview Weekend with Brannon Howse, Grace to You with John MacArthur, In Touch with Dr. Charles Stanley, Love Worth Finding with Adrian Rogers, Revive Our Hearts with Nancy Leigh DeMoss, The Alternative with Tony Evans, Liberty Council's Faith and Freedom Report, Thru the Bible with J. Vernon McGee, Joni and Friends, Unshackled!, and Moody Radio's Stories of Great Christians.

KVCX also airs a variety of vocal and instrumental traditional Christian Music, as well as children's programming such as Ranger Bill.

== History ==
The station began broadcasting on May 8, 1982, and held the call sign KKSD. KKSD aired country music and farm programming. In 1987, the station was sold to Wisconsin Voice of Christian Youth for $255,000. The station adopted its current Christian format, and its call sign was changed to KVCX.

== See also ==
- VCY America
- Vic Eliason
- List of VCY America Radio Stations
