= KVCY =

VCY America radio station in Fort Scott, Kansas

- Fort Scott, Kansas; United States
- Broadcast area: Pittsburg, Kansas
- Frequency: 104.7 MHz
- Branding: VCY America

Programming
- Format: Christian
- Affiliations: VCY America

Ownership
- Owner: VCY America, Inc.

History
- Call sign meaning: Voice of Christian Youth

Technical information
- Licensing authority: FCC
- Facility ID: 73062
- Class: C3
- ERP: 16,000 watts
- HAAT: 125 meters (410 ft)
- Transmitter coordinates: 37°52′43.00″N 94°43′24.00″W

Links
- Public license information: Public file; LMS
- Webcast: Listen Live
- Website: vcyamerica.org

KVCY (104.7 FM) is a radio station broadcasting a Christian format. Licensed to Fort Scott, Kansas, United States, it serves the Pittsburg area. The station is currently owned by VCY America, Inc.. KVCY is also heard in the Joplin, Missouri area on 106.3 FM, through translator station K292FX.

== Programming ==
KVCY's programming includes Christian Talk and Teaching programming including; Crosstalk, Worldview Weekend with Brannon Howse, Grace to You with John MacArthur, In Touch with Dr. Charles Stanley, Love Worth Finding with Adrian Rogers, Revive Our Hearts with Nancy Leigh DeMoss, The Alternative with Tony Evans, Liberty Council's Faith and Freedom Report, Thru the Bible with J. Vernon McGee, Joni and Friends, Unshackled!, and Moody Radio's Stories of Great Christians.

KVCY also airs a variety of vocal and instrumental traditional Christian music, as well as children's programming such as Ranger Bill.

== Translator ==
Call sign	Frequency	City of license	FID	ERP (W)	Class	FCC info
K292FX	106.3 FM	Joplin, Missouri	139120	250	D	LMS
