= WEGZ =

Coordinates: 46°41′31″N 90°59′27″W

- Washburn, Wisconsin; United States
- Broadcast area: Ashland, Wisconsin; Ironwood, Michigan; Two Harbors, Minnesota
- Frequency: 105.9 MHz

Programming
- Format: Christian radio
- Network: VCY America

Ownership
- Owner: VCY America; (Keweenaw Bay Broadcasting, Inc.)

History
- First air date: October 5, 1981
- Former call signs: WBWA (1981–1990)

Technical information
- Licensing authority: FCC
- Facility ID: 15972
- Class: C1
- ERP: 100,000 watts
- HAAT: 226 meters (741 ft)

Links
- Public license information: Public file; LMS
- Webcast: Listen live
- Website: vcyamerica.org

WEGZ is a Christian radio station licensed to Washburn, Wisconsin, broadcasting on 105.9 FM. The station is owned by VCY America.

== Programming ==
WEGZ's programming includes Christian Talk and Teaching programming including; Crosstalk, Worldview Weekend with Brannon Howse, Grace to You with John MacArthur, In Touch with Dr. Charles Stanley, Love Worth Finding with Adrian Rogers, Revive Our Hearts with Nancy Leigh DeMoss, The Alternative with Tony Evans, Liberty Council's Faith and Freedom Report, Thru the Bible with J. Vernon McGee, Joni and Friends, Unshackled!, and Moody Radio's Stories of Great Christians.

WEGZ also airs a variety of vocal and instrumental traditional Christian Music, as well as children's programming such as Ranger Bill.

== History ==
The station began broadcasting October 5, 1981, holding the call sign WBWA. The station aired a MOR format, and was owned by Silver Birch Broadcasting.

In 1990, the station was sold to DDS Communications for $98,000 and the station's call sign was changed to WEGZ. WEGZ would adopt a country music format and was branded "Eagle Country 106".

The station adopted its present format on January 1, 2002. DDS Communications, the licensee of WEGZ, was sold to VCY America for $465,000 shortly thereafter.

== See also ==
- VCY America
- List of VCY America Radio Stations
