= WVCY-FM =

VCY America Flagship Station
- Milwaukee, Wisconsin; United States
- Frequency: 107.7 MHz
- Branding: VCY America

Programming
- Format: Christian radio
- Affiliations: SRN News

Ownership
- Owner: VCY America; (VCY America, Inc.)
- Sister stations: WVCY-TV

History
- First air date: February 26, 1964
- Former call signs: WBON (1964–1973); WVCY (1973–1995)
- Call sign meaning: Wisconsin Voice of Christian Youth

Technical information
- Facility ID: 73059
- Class: B
- ERP: 43,000 watts
- HAAT: 161 meters (528 ft)
- Transmitter coordinates: 42.963°N 88.073°W
- Translator: 94.9 W235AG (Sheboygan)

Links
- Webcast: Listen live
- Website: www.vcyamerica.org

WVCY-FM (107.7 MHz) is a non-commercial listener-supported radio station in Milwaukee, Wisconsin. It is owned by VCY America, founded by Vic Eliason, with studios on West Kilbourn Avenue. WVCY-FM is the flagship station of the VCY America Christian radio network, airing a mix of talk and teaching programs and traditional Christian music. The station has multiple FM translators in Wisconsin and other Midwest states.

WVCY-FM is a Class B FM station, with an effective radiated power (ERP) of 43,000 watts. The transmitter is on Beloit Road at SW 124th Street in New Berlin.

== Programming ==
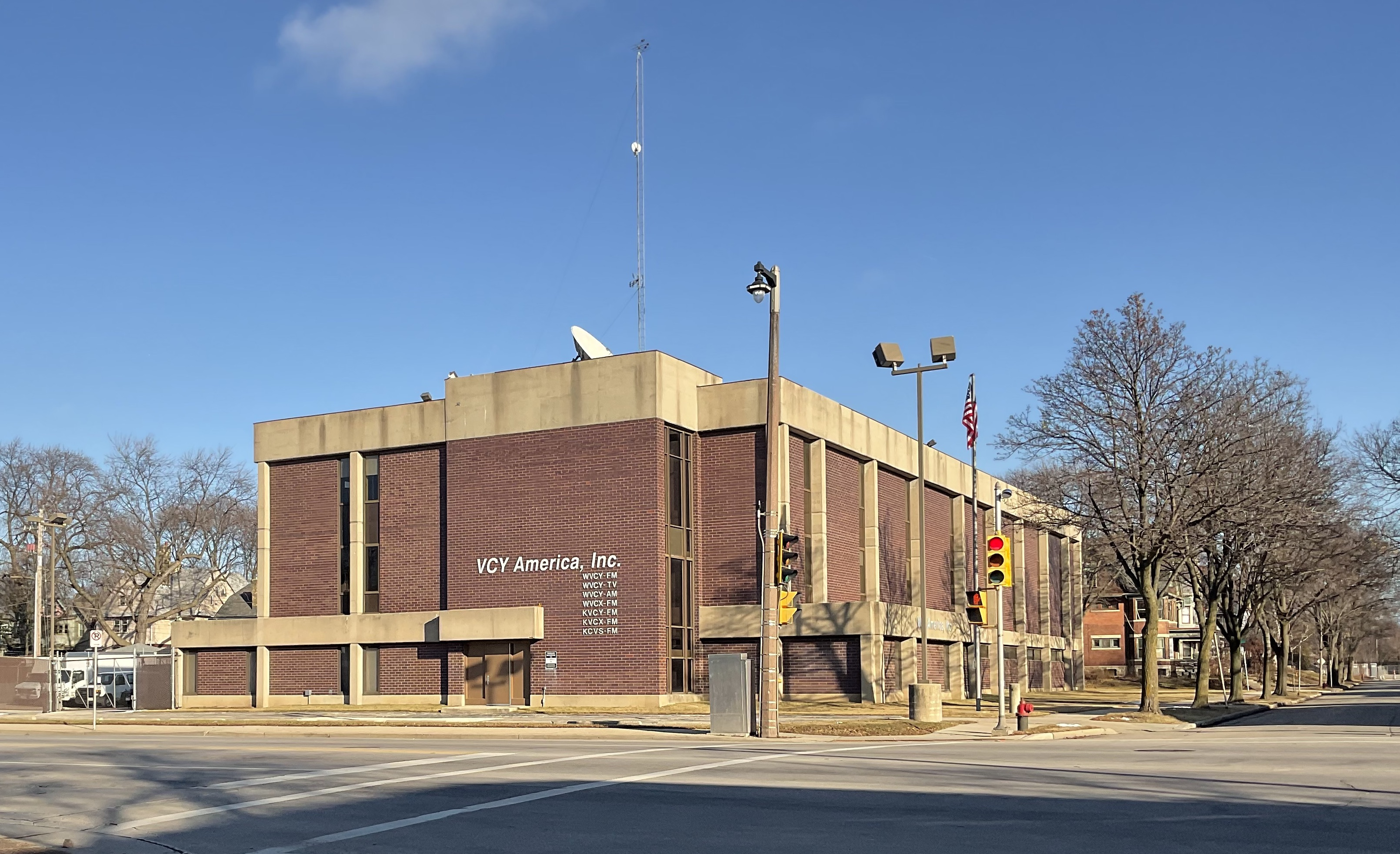
The headquarters for VCY America in the Miller Valley neighborhood of Milwaukee.

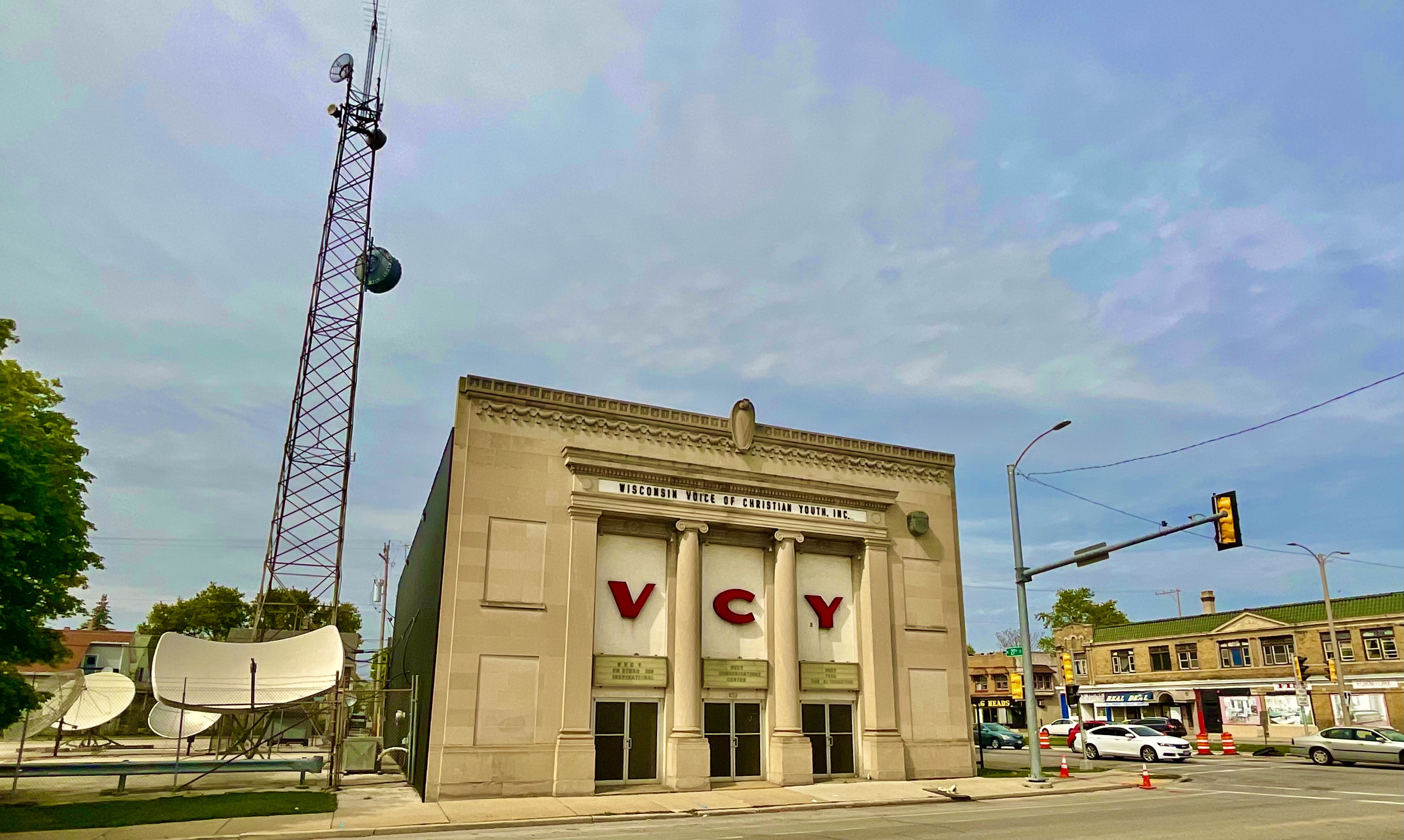
WVCY's actual studio facility for channel 30 and 107.7 FM is based a mile northeast of the VCY America building.

WVCY's programming features a combination of Christian talk and teaching shows alongside traditional Christian music. The talk shows include Crosstalk, Worldview Weekend with Brannon Howse, Grace to You with John MacArthur, In Touch with Dr. Charles Stanley, Love Worth Finding with Adrian Rogers, Revive Our Hearts with Nancy DeMoss Wolgemuth, The Alternative with Tony Evans, Liberty Counsel's Faith and Freedom Report, Thru the Bible with J. Vernon McGee, Joni and Friends, Unshackled!, and Moody Radio's Stories of Great Christians.

WVCY's playlist focuses on vocal and instrumental traditional Christian music. It completely disallows Christian contemporary music in any form, to the point that outside programs are dropped if they play it. On Saturday mornings, WVCY airs children's programming, including Kids Talk with Uncle Aaron and Aunt Amber and Ranger Bill. The station also carries political debates from the state's public television networks, along with major speeches such as the State of the Union Address. Updates from SRN News are heard several times each day.

== History ==
The station was first licensed February 26, 1964, and held the call sign WBON. The station aired religious and classical music. It was owned by Industrial Sound Engineering. At the time, the power and antenna height were limited, with the station only heard in Milwaukee and its closer suburbs.

In 1973, the "Wisconsin Voice of Christian Youth" organization acquired the station. On June 11, 1973, the call sign was changed to WVCY. The power and antenna height were boosted to the maximum Class B levels. The station took on the -FM suffix in 1995 when VCY America purchased WXOL in Oshkosh in 1995, which became WVCY (AM) (690).

== Translators ==
WVCY-FM has one direct translator located in Sheboygan, which transmits from a county-owned tower located within Taylor Park.

Call sign	Frequency	City of license	FID	ERP (W)	HAAT	Class	Transmitter coordinates	FCC info
W235AG	94.9 FM	Sheboygan, Wisconsin	86541	18	95 m (312 ft)	D	43°45′15.9″N 87°44′55.3″W	LMS

== See also ==
- VCY America
- Vic Eliason
- List of VCY America Radio Stations
