= WVCY =

WVCY may refer to:

- WVCY (AM), a radio station broadcasting at 690 kHz on the AM band, licensed to Oshkosh, Wisconsin
- WVCY-FM, a radio station broadcasting at 107.7 MHz on the FM band, licensed to Milwaukee, Wisconsin
- WVCY-TV, a television station broadcasting on 22 digital (mapped to 30 PSIP) licensed to Milwaukee, Wisconsin
