= VCY America =

Christian radio network

- Type: Radio network
- Country: United States
- Headquarters: Milwaukee, Wisconsin

Ownership
- Owner: VCY America, Inc.

History
- Founded: 1954 by Vic Eliason
- Launch date: 1954; 72 years ago
- Former names: Milwaukee Youth for Christ

Links
- Webcast: Listen Live
- Website: https://www.vcy.org/

VCY America, Inc. is a traditional, evangelical, conservative Christian ministry based in Milwaukee, Wisconsin. The VCY America Radio Network maintains a format of Christian talk and teaching, as well as traditional Christian music through its broadcast outlets.

== History ==
Originally known as "Milwaukee Youth For Christ", and later, "Greater Milwaukee Youth For Christ", it left the national YFC organization in 1973 and became known as the Wisconsin Voice of Christian Youth (WVCY) until 1995, when it changed to its present name. Its flagship stations in Milwaukee, WVCY-FM and WVCY-TV, share a call sign which refers to the ministry's original name.

== Radio network ==
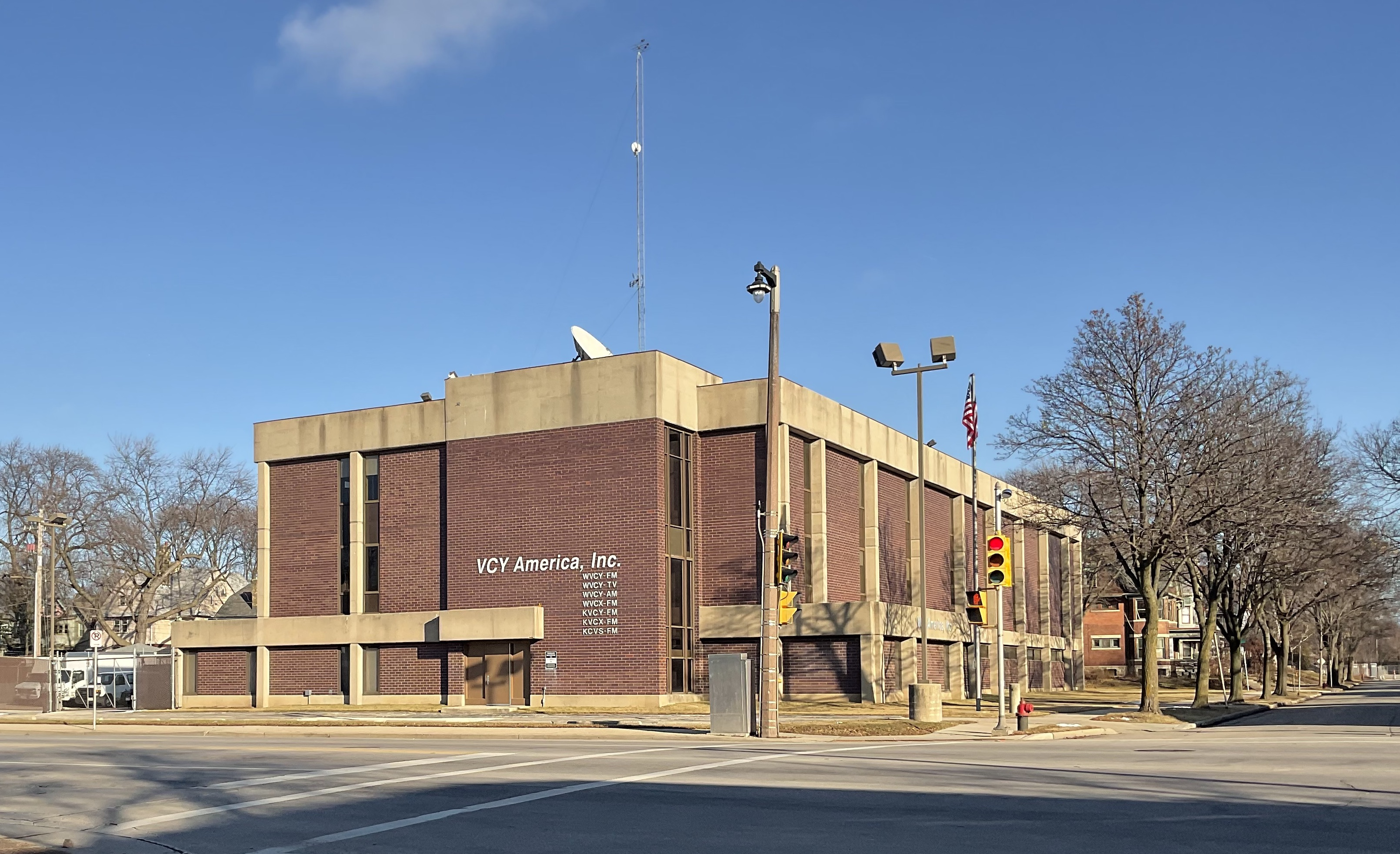
VCY America's operation center, studios and headquarters in the Miller Valley neighborhood of Milwaukee, which contains the call signs for the stations managed out of the facility purchased before 1998 upon its facade.

The ministry operates 41 VCY America-owned radio stations in Arizona, California, Colorado, Delaware, Illinois, Indiana, Iowa, Kansas, Michigan, Minnesota, Missouri, Nevada, New Mexico, New York, Ohio, South Dakota, Texas, West Virginia, and Wisconsin. It also broadcasts over 26 low-power FM translators and many affiliate stations. VCY America radio also provides programming such as Crosstalk, Worldview Weekend, and Music 'til Dawn to stations throughout the country via satellite. Additionally, VCY has a Christian bookstore in Wauwatosa, Wisconsin which is promoted on air and ships throughout the United States as an additional source of revenue.

VCY has attempted to expand into the San Francisco Bay Area, Las Vegas, and the Coachella Valley through the lease and attempted purchase of a group of three stations in a bankruptcy action: KFRH, KREV and KRCK-FM. In early 2022, the original owner sued successfully to nullify the bankruptcy action against them, and the bankruptcy debtor in possession and trustee was forced to return to the stations to them and nullify the VCY America leases. In October 2023, VCY America participated in a bankruptcy auction for these stations and was the winning bidder for KFRH, KRCK-FM, and two translators in the Palm Springs area for $2,445,952.88. KFRH in North Las Vegas, Nevada's call sign was changed to KVPH and it began airing VCY America's programming on March 18, 2024.

In December 2022 VCY America announced it would purchase WFAS-FM in the New York City area from Cumulus Media, pending final approval from the Federal Communications Commission. Renamed WVBN, the acquisition, completed on February 6, 2023, gave VCY America its first broadcast outlet on the East Coast. VCY America added to its Northeastern expansion in August 2023 with its purchase of WJBR-FM in Wilmington, Delaware, from Beasley Broadcast Group. VCY took control of the station October 6, changing its call sign to WVCW; the move brings its programming into the Philadelphia market.

=== Programming ===
VCY America's radio programming includes Christian talk and teaching programming, among them:

- Crosstalk, hosted by Jim Schneider, with past Vic Eliason-hosted episodes also aired
- Worldview Weekend with Brannon Howse
- Grace to You with John MacArthur
- In Touch with Charles Stanley
- Love Worth Finding with Adrian Rogers
- Revive Our Hearts with Nancy DeMoss Wolgemuth
- The Alternative with Tony Evans
- Liberty Counsel's Faith and Freedom Report
- Thru the Bible with J. Vernon McGee
- Joni and Friends with Joni Eareckson Tada
- Unshackled!
- Moody Radio's Stories of Great Christians
- Brinkman Adventures

VCY America also airs a variety of vocal and instrumental traditional Christian music, as well as children's programming such as Ranger Bill. Notably, the network (including WVCY-TV) eschews any programs featuring Contemporary Christian music, and has dropped programming which has switched to it in any form, including as theme music.

== Television ==
The ministry also owns WVCY-TV (Channel 30) in Milwaukee, which holds a commercial license but is completely viewer supported. As of January 2018, it is carried under a channel share agreement with commercial station WITI, owned by Fox Television Stations. It vacated its former independent frequency in the FCC's spectrum repack auction, the proceeds of which ($76.3 million, plus donations and bookstore purchases since) have been utilized to expand VCY's radio network. WVCY-TV is also carried in the Wausau television market via translator W26EE-D, licensed to Wittenburg.

In 1994, WVCY-TV rejected an offer to be purchased by CBS and become the network's new Milwaukee affiliate, following WITI's defection to Fox as part of the 1994–1996 United States broadcast television realignment.

In December 2025, VCY TV began airing on 26.9 WZEO-LD in La Crosse, Wisconsin and 34.9 WRJT-LD in Wausau, Wisconsin.

== Other efforts ==
The ministry also operates a summer camp, near Hillsboro, Wisconsin, called, "Trail Ridge Camp" as well as its religious bookstore, with a physical location in Wauwatosa, a suburb of Milwaukee, and its online presence.

== Leadership ==
The ministry is run by a team formerly headed by the late Vic Eliason, a former Youth for Christ worker, ordained Christian minister and a recipient of an honorary doctorate from Bob Jones University, in 2001. Jim Schneider is the current executive director.

== List of stations ==
=== Owned and operated ===
Call sign	Frequency	City of license	State	Class	Power (W)	ERP (W)	Height (m (ft))	FCC info
KVCP	88.3 FM	Phoenix	Arizona	C1	—	22,500	304 m (997 ft)	FCC (KVCP)
KVCC	88.5 FM	Tucson	Arizona	A	—	1,500	115 m (377 ft)	FCC (KVCC)
KVPW	97.7 FM	Mecca	California	A	—	1,600	197 m (646 ft)	FCC (KVPW)
WVCW	99.5 FM	Wilmington	Delaware	B	—	50,000	152 m (499 ft)	FCC (WVCW)
WLUV	1520 AM	Loves Park	Illinois	D	500 (day); 13 (night)	—	—	FCC (WLUV)
WPTH	88.1 FM	Olney	Illinois	A	—	2,900	61 m (200 ft)	FCC (WPTH)
WVSB	106.3 FM	South Bend	Indiana	A	—	1,400	134.8 m (442 ft)	FCC (WVSB)
KVPG	103.9 FM	Dunkerton	Iowa	C3	—	14,000	65 m (213 ft)	FCC (KVPG)
KVDI	99.3 FM	Huxley	Iowa	A	—	5,300	95 m (312 ft)	FCC (KVDI)
KVCI	89.7 FM	Montezuma	Iowa	C1	—	100,000	151 m (495 ft)	FCC (KVCI)
KVPJ	94.7 FM	Rockford	Iowa	A	—	3,100	65 m (213 ft)	FCC (KVPJ)
KVCY	104.7 FM	Fort Scott	Kansas	C3	—	16,000	125 m (410 ft)	FCC (KVCY)
KCVS	91.7 FM	Salina	Kansas	C2	—	11,500	228 m (748 ft)	FCC (KCVS)
WVCN	104.3 FM	Baraga	Michigan	C1	—	100,000	262 m (860 ft)	FCC (WVCN)
WVCM	91.5 FM	Iron Mountain	Michigan	A	—	500	183 m (600 ft)	FCC (WVCM)
WQRN	88.9 FM	Cook	Minnesota	C3	—	16,000	70 m (230 ft)	FCC (WQRN)
WQRM	850 AM	Duluth	Minnesota	B	50,000 (day); 14,000 (c.h.)	—	—	FCC (WQRM)
KVCS	89.1 FM	Spring Valley	Minnesota	C3	—	12,000	138 m (453 ft)	FCC (KVCS)
WRVX	91.7 FM	Cameron	Missouri	C2	—	27,500	116 m (381 ft)	FCC (WRVX)
KIRS	107.7 FM	Stockton	Missouri	C3	—	11,700	146 m (479 ft)	FCC (KIRS)
KVPH	104.3 FM	North Las Vegas	Nevada	C	—	24,500	1,128 m (3,701 ft)	FCC (KVPH)
KVCN	106.7 FM	Los Alamos	New Mexico	C0	—	44,000	592 m (1,942 ft)	FCC (KVCN)
WVBN	103.9 FM	Bronxville	New York	A	—	980	162.1 m (532 ft)	FCC (WVBN)
WJIC	91.7 FM	Zanesville	Ohio	A	—	6,000	97 m (318 ft)	FCC (WJIC)
KVCF	90.5 FM	Freeman	South Dakota	C2	—	9,000	246 m (807 ft)	FCC (KVCF)
KVCX	101.5 FM	Gregory	South Dakota	C1	—	100,000	195 m (640 ft)	FCC (KVCX)
KVCH	88.7 FM	Huron	South Dakota	C1	—	60,000	161 m (528 ft)	FCC (KVCH)
KVFL	89.1 FM	Pierre	South Dakota	A	—	400	113 m (371 ft)	FCC (KVFL)
KVPC	97.7 FM	Rapid City	South Dakota	C	—	100,000	579 m (1,900 ft)	FCC (KVPC)
KVDT	103.3 FM	Allen	Texas	C	—	98,000	606 m (1,988 ft)	FCC (KVCE)
KVLM	104.7 FM	Tarzan	Texas	C1	—	100,000	224 m (735 ft)	FCC (KVLM)
KVCE	92.7 FM	Slaton	Texas	C1	—	100,000	182 m (597 ft)	FCC (KVCE)
WVIW	104.1 FM	Bridgeport	West Virginia	A	—	2,450	158 m (518 ft)	FCC (WVIW)
WVCF	90.5 FM	Eau Claire	Wisconsin	A	—	1,600	112 m (367 ft)	FCC (WVCF)
WVFL	89.9 FM	Fond du Lac	Wisconsin	A	—	1,000	117 m (384 ft)	FCC (WVFL)
WVCY-FM (Note: Flagship station)	107.7 FM	Milwaukee	Wisconsin	B	—	43,000	161 m (528 ft)	FCC (WVCY-FM)
WVCY	690 AM	Oshkosh	Wisconsin	B	250 (day); 77 (night)	—	—	FCC (WVCY)
WVCS	90.1 FM	Owen	Wisconsin	C3	—	1,900	153 m (502 ft)	FCC (WVCS)
WVCX	98.9 FM	Tomah	Wisconsin	C0	—	100,000	300 m (980 ft)	FCC (WVCX)
WEGZ	105.9 FM	Washburn	Wisconsin	C1	—	100,000	226 m (741 ft)	FCC (WEGZ)
WVRN	88.9 FM	Wittenberg	Wisconsin	C2	—	25,000	147 m (482 ft)	FCC (WVRN)

Notes:

Broadcast translators of VCY America
Call sign	Frequency (MHz)	City of license	State	ERP (W)	Height (m (ft))	Class	FCC info
K251BX	98.1	Palm Desert	California	158	193 m (633 ft)	D	FCC (K251BX)
K293AO	106.5	Alamosa	Colorado	250	34.8 m (114 ft)	D	FCC (K293AO)
K214DE	90.7	Antonito	Colorado	10	731 m (2,398 ft)	D	FCC (K214DE)
W287BY	105.3	Rockford	Illinois	135	90 m (300 ft)	D	FCC (W287BY)
W249CX	97.7	Duluth	Minnesota	250	164 m (538 ft)	D	FCC (W249CX)
K292FX	106.3	Joplin	Missouri	250	60.7 m (199 ft)	D	FCC (K292FX)
K203EZ	88.5	Alamogordo	New Mexico	10	509.1 m (1,670 ft)	D	FCC (K203EZ)
K207CQ	89.3	Gallup	New Mexico	100	12 m (39 ft)	D	FCC (K207CQ)
K211CW	90.1	Hobbs	New Mexico	57	99 m (325 ft)	D	FCC (K211CW)
K250AB	97.9	Roswell	New Mexico	205	42.5 m (139 ft)	D	FCC (K250AB)
K220CE	91.9	Ruidoso	New Mexico	82	918 m (3,012 ft)	D	FCC (K220CE)
K212EH	90.3	Silver City	New Mexico	2	461 m (1,512 ft)	D	FCC (K212EH)
W232CQ	94.3	Cambridge	Ohio	13	108 m (354 ft)	D	FCC (W232CQ)
K206EQ	89.1	Brookings	South Dakota	250	41 m (135 ft)	D	FCC (K206EQ)
K258AG	99.5	Mitchell	South Dakota	250	86 m (282 ft)	D	FCC (K258AG)
K293BQ	106.5	Sioux Falls	South Dakota	250	22.8 m (75 ft)	D	FCC (K293BQ)
K278BK	103.5	Watertown	South Dakota	250	78.2 m (257 ft)	D	FCC (K278BK)
W286DS	105.1	Appleton	Wisconsin	120	68 m (223 ft)	D	FCC (W286DS)
W216BL	91.1	McFarland	Wisconsin	120	30 m (98 ft)	D	FCC (W216BL)
W211AU	90.1	Monroe	Wisconsin	13	105 m (344 ft)	D	FCC (W211AU)
W260DL	99.9	Oshkosh	Wisconsin	155	83 m (272 ft)	D	FCC (W260DL)
K208FO	89.5	Prairie du Chien	Wisconsin	205	19.6 m (64 ft)	D	FCC (K208FO)
W275CH	102.9	Ripon	Wisconsin	13	96 m (315 ft)	D	FCC (W275CH)
W235AG	94.9	Sheboygan	Wisconsin	18	95 m (312 ft)	D	FCC (W235AG)
W218CC	91.5	Wausau	Wisconsin	85	16 m (52 ft)	D	FCC (W218CC)

=== Full time affiliates ===
Call sign	Frequency	City of license	State	Class	ERP (W)	Height (m (ft))	FCC info
KPVL	89.1 FM	Postville	Iowa	A	3,000	75 m (246 ft)	FCC (KPVL)
WPWM	90.9 FM	Wheatfield	Indiana	A	1,800	76 m (249 ft)	FCC (WPWM)
KHBN	91.3 FM	Beloit	Kansas	A	6,000	65 m (213 ft)	FCC (KHBN)
KYAS	88.7 FM	Artesia	New Mexico	A	500	19 m (62 ft)	FCC (KYAS)
KHBN	88.1 FM	Roswell	New Mexico	A	350	42 m (138 ft)	FCC (KHBN)
WOBI	89.7 FM	Oak Beach	New York	A	150	11 m (36 ft)	FCC (WOBI)
KYPT	90.7 FM	Minot	North Dakota	A	400	41 m (135 ft)	FCC (KVPG)
KFCA	88.1 FM	Aberdeen	South Dakota	A	2,300	32 m (105 ft)	FCC (KFCA)
