= KVPH =

Radio station in North Las Vegas, Nevada

- North Las Vegas, Nevada; United States
- Broadcast area: Las Vegas metropolitan area
- Frequency: 104.3 MHz

Programming
- Format: Christian radio
- Network: VCY America

Ownership
- Owner: VCY America, Inc.

History
- First air date: April 1989; 36 years ago (as KJUL)
- Former call signs: KJUL (1987–2005); KCYE (2005–2009); KFRH (2009–2024)

Technical information
- Licensing authority: FCC
- Facility ID: 19062
- Class: C
- ERP: 24,500 watts
- HAAT: 1,128 meters (3,701 ft)
- Transmitter coordinates: 35.967°N 115.502°W

Links
- Public license information: Public file; LMS
- Webcast: Listen live
- Website: www.vcy.org

KVPH (104.3 FM) is a non-commercial radio station licensed to North Las Vegas, Nevada, broadcasting to the Las Vegas metropolitan area. It is owned by VCY America, Inc. and airs a Christian radio format. It carries a mix of Christian talk and teaching programs with soft Christian worship music. The station asks for donations on the air and on line.

KVPH is a Class C FM station. It has an effective radiated power (ERP) of 24,500 watts. The transmitter is on Potosi Mountain in Blue Diamond, Nevada, southwest of Las Vegas.

== History ==
=== Adult standards (1987–2005) ===
In 1981, the Federal Communications Commission (FCC) held a spectrum auction for the 104.3 frequency. A construction permit was issued in 1986 to the winning company, Eight Chiefs, Inc. It was assigned the KJUL call letters on January 14, 1987.

KJUL signed on the air in April 1989. It was known as "K-Jewel", airing an adult standards and soft oldies format. Artists played on the station included Frank Sinatra, Barbra Streisand, Nat King Cole, The Carpenters and Dionne Warwick. KJUL was sold to Nevada Radio in January 1997, which merged with Centennial Nevada in 1998.

In 2005, KJUL was awarded "Station Of The Year" at the National Association of Broadcasters' Marconi Awards.

=== Country (2005–2009) ===
On October 3, 2005, KJUL dropped the adult standards format for country music. It began calling itself "The Coyote". On October 10, KJUL officially became KCYE. The old KJUL call sign and adult standards format were later adopted by a station in Moapa Valley at 104.7 FM. KCYE was later acquired by Beasley Broadcast Group.

=== Top 40 (2009–2021) ===
In early 2009, Beasley announced that Royce International Broadcasting would acquire the station; the deal did not include the "Coyote" branding or KCYE call sign, which Beasley would move to KFRH (102.7 FM). The sale was approved on July 20, and was consummated on August 25, 2009. Upon the closure of the acquisition, KCYE flipped to contemporary hit radio as "104.3 Now", and took on the KFRH call sign.

From April 2016 to June 2018, on behalf of W.B. Music and other music companies, ASCAP successfully sued Royce International Broadcasting Corp. and its subsidiaries in the United States District Court for the Central District of California. The complaint was copyright infringement. The result was a $330,000 judgment, increased to over $1.3 million with attorney fees and sanctions.

After the defendants were unable to pay, KFRH was transferred into a court-ordered receivership controlled by broker Larry Patrick on July 6, 2020, along with two other CHR stations mentioned in the lawsuit, KREV in San Francisco and KRCK-FM in the Coachella Valley of California.

The Court Order appointing the receiver authorized Larry Patrick to take control of the three FM radio stations, and to "solicit offers for the sale of defendants’ radio stations’ assets". However, that appointment order did not give Patrick control of the business entities.

=== Christian (2020–2022) ===
On December 30, 2020, VCY America, a non-profit Christian radio broadcaster based in Wisconsin, announced it would acquire the three stations.

The December 28, 2020 "Asset Purchase Agreement" entered into by Larry Patrick has been criticized for being a "fire sale price" of $6 million for all three FM stations. The contract was signed by "W. Lawrence Patrick, solely in his capacity as court-appointed receiver for Silver State Broadcasting LLC, Golden State Broadcasting LLC, and Major Market Radio LLC" Never the less, the appointment order stated that Patrick was receiver over the three FM stations only, not the business entities.

On March 15, 2021, Judge Jesus Bernal denied Stolz' bid to end the receivership and have the stations returned to him. VCY America began operating the three stations under a local marketing agreement (LMA) while the sale of the stations was being finalized. It began carrying VCY America's national network, featuring Christian talk and teaching programs with some Christian music.

The LMA cost VCY America $5,000 per month to operate all three FM stations. The deal was criticized for being underpriced. A comparable LMA for a San Francisco FM radio station was $80,000 per month for one station. As with the Asset Purchase Agreement, the LMA was entered into by Larry Patrick purportedly as receiver of the business entities, while the Order of Appointment stated that Patrick was receiver over the FM radio assets only.

=== Talk (2022–2023) ===
On January 31, 2022, federal Judge August B. Landis apparently quashed the sale of the stations by ordering Receiver Larry Patrick to turn over control of KFRH (and Stolz's other two FM stations) back to Stolz's companies. After Stolz regained control of the station, KFRH replaced VCY America's programming with a simulcast of talk radio outlet KBET (790 AM).

=== Urban contemporary (2023–2024) ===
In mid September 2023, KFRH flipped to an urban contemporary format, branded as "104.3 The Hu$tle", competing with other Vegas urban stations Hot 97.5 and Real 103.9.

Radio stations KYLZ in Albuquerque and KREV in San Francisco also called themselves "The Hu$tle" and aired a similar urban contemporary format.

=== Return to Christian VCY (2024–present) ===
In October 2023, VCY America participated in a bankruptcy auction for KFRH, KRCK-FM and two translators in the Palm Springs area. VCY America was chosen the winning bidder for the stations at a price tag of $2,445,952.80. The price tag for the Las Vegas station alone was $1,954,219.16.

KFRH's call sign was changed to KVPH on March 18, 2024, coincident with the consummation of the sale. It returned to airing VCY America's programming the same day.
