= WXOL =

WXOL may refer to:

- WXOL-LP, a low-power radio station (106.3 FM) licensed to serve Dresden, Tennessee, United States
- WQCD (AM), a radio station (1550 AM) licensed to serve Delaware, Ohio, United States, which held the call sign WXOL from 2004 to 2007
- WVCY (AM), a radio station (690 AM) licensed to serve Oshkosh, Wisconsin, United States, which held the call sign WXOL from 1992 to 1995
- WRLL, a radio station (1450 AM) licensed to serve Cicero, Illinois, United States, which held the call sign WXOL from 1979 to 1984
