= WGIF =

- Rice Lake, Wisconsin; United States
- Broadcast area: Rice Lake and Barron
- Frequency: 90.1 MHz

Programming
- Format: Religious
- Affiliations: VCY America

Ownership
- Owner: Barron Calvary Baptist Church, Inc

History
- First air date: December 2024
- Call sign meaning: God Is Faithful

Technical information
- Licensing authority: FCC
- Facility ID: 768237
- Class: A
- ERP: 6,000 watts
- HAAT: 41 meters (135 ft)
- Transmitter coordinates: 45°21′02″N 91°50′49.8″W

Links
- Public license information: Public file; LMS

WGIF (90.1 FM) is a radio station licensed to Rice Lake, Wisconsin, United States. The station is owned by Barron Calvary Baptist Church, Inc and carries religious programming.

== History ==
WGIF was originally granted a license during a 2021 filing window. At the same time, WEPP 90.7 Rice Lake, nearby, was licensed as well. WGIF was among the first full powered non-commercial radio stations in Barron County. There are six other commercial stations in the vicinity. It is the first radio station in Barron County catered to the specific format.

The station partnered with VCY America based out of Milwaukee to provide programming. The station also carries live broadcasts from the church on Sundays. The station's tower was constructed with help from the members of the church, and is located on private land, south of Barron. The tower is 140 feet (43 m) tall, and construction was approved in May 2023 by the Barron County Board of Adjustment.
