= KRCK =

KRCK may refer to:

- KVPW, a radio station (97.7 FM) licensed to serve Mecca, California, United States, which held the call sign KRCK-FM from 1999 to 2024
- KCLB-FM, a radio station (93.7 FM) licensed to serve Coachella, California, which held the call sign KRCK in 1988
- KXL-FM, a radio station (101.1 FM) licensed to serve Portland, Oregon, United States, which held the call sign KRCK from 1983 to 1985
