= Richard Lineback =

American actor (born 1952)

- Born: February 4, 1952 (age 74); Frankfurt, Hesse, West Germany
- Other name: Richard D. Lineback
- Occupation: Actor
- Years active: 1975–present

Richard D. Lineback (born February 4, 1952) is an American actor who appeared in the films Speed, Twister and Varsity Blues. He played Deputy Dodd in Friday the 13th: A New Beginning.

Lineback has appeared in many roles on the stage, with leads that include Tom Joad in The Grapes of Wrath, C.C. Showers in The Diviners, for which he won the Drama-Logue Award for Outstanding Actor, and the title role in Mister Roberts.

He has also made numerous guest appearances for television, including Romas in Star Trek: The Next Generation, Selin Peers in Star Trek: Deep Space Nine and Kessick in Star Trek: Enterprise. He also appeared as the Rev. Vernon Canty in two episodes of JAG. He also appeared in two episodes of M*A*S*H, playing different characters.

== Early life ==
Lineback was born in Frankfurt, Germany, as the son of American parents Carl Mayo Lineback (1922–2004) and Dorothy Anne Darnall (1923–2008). His siblings are Robert B. Lineback (born 1953) and Carol A. Lineback (born 1955). His father was a physician and an officer in the U.S. Army assigned to the 97th General Hospital in Frankfurt. When he retired from active military service in 1965, Dr. Lineback relocated with his family to Austin, Texas, where he established a private practice.

Richard Lineback graduated from John H. Reagan High School in Austin in 1970, where he appeared in several student theatrical productions. After attending the University of Texas at Austin., he moved to Los Angeles, California to pursue an acting career.

== Career ==
In 1975, Lineback joined the Colony Theatre Company in Burbank, and was in the cast of the play The Grass Harp. He appeared in many stage roles, including those of Eugene Gant in Look Homeward, Angel; Tom Joad in The Grapes of Wrath; C.C. Showers in The Diviners, for which he won the Drama-Logue Award for Outstanding Actor; Dan White in Execution of Justice; and the title role in Mister Roberts.

His film debut was the role of Steve Estes in the biopic/drama Joni (1980), the story of Joni Eareckson. He played Larry in the western/drama Hard Country (1981) with Jan-Michael Vincent and Kim Basinger; then played Deputy Dodd in the slasher/horror film Friday the 13th: A New Beginning (1985).

His many television guest appearances include episodes of The Love Boat, M*A*S*H, The Waltons, Crazy Like a Fox, T. J. Hooker, Knight Rider, Matlock, Star Trek: The Next Generation, Hunter, China Beach, Dallas, Star Trek: Deep Space Nine, NYPD Blue, Touched by an Angel, Star Trek: Enterprise and JAG. He also played Billy in the Incident In a Small Jail segment of the television film Alfred Hitchcock Presents (1985), and played scheming businessman Wally Butler in the 1986 TV film Return to Mayberry.

Lineback appeared as Al LeFauve in the world premiere stage production of Baby Dance, co-starring Linda Purl and Stephanie Zimbalist, at the Pasadena Playhouse, and was nominated for the Los Angeles Drama Critics Circle Award for Best Actor for his performance. He later reprised the role at the Williamstown Theatre Festival in Massachusetts, and the Long Wharf Theatre in New Haven.

In the film Natural Born Killers (1994), Lineback's character, Sonny, was the first redneck to be shot to death by the murderous couple Mickey Knox (played by Woody Harrelson) and Mallory Knox (played by Juliette Lewis). In Twister (1996), his character, Mr. Thornton (Jo Harding's father), was the victim of a raging tornado. He played an FBI special agent, McMurphy, in the crime/thriller The Jackal (1997) with Bruce Willis, Richard Gere and Sidney Poitier.

Lineback recreated his performance as Al LeFauve for the Showtime film The Baby Dance (1998) co-starring Stockard Channing and Laura Dern. He played the innkeeper in the horror film The Ring (2002) featuring Naomi Watts and Martin Henderson.

Lineback resides in Los Angeles.

== Filmography ==
=== Film ===
Title	Release	Genre	Role	Notes
Joni	1980	Biopic / Drama	Steve Estes	
Hard Country	1981	Western / Drama	Larry	
Friday the 13th: A New Beginning	1985	Slasher / Horror	Deputy Dodd	
Stewardess School	1986	Action / Comedy	Sergeant Striker	
Beyond the Next Mountain	1987	Adventure / Drama	Mr. Young Man	
Sommersby	1993	Mystery / Romance	Timothy Fry	
Speed	1994	Action / Thriller	Sergeant Norwood	
Natural Born Killers	1994	Crime	Sonny	
The Stars Fell on Henrietta	1995	Drama	Les Furrows, Banker	
Twister	1996	Action / Adventure	Eric Thornton	
Tin Cup	1996	Comedy / Romance	Curt	
The Jackal	1997	Crime / Thriller	FBI Special Agent McMurphy	
After the Game	1997	Drama / Mystery	"Slim", The Bartender	
Hush	1998	Drama / Thriller	Hal Bentall	
Meet the Deedles	1998	Comedy	Mr. Crabbe	
Varsity Blues	1999	Comedy / Sport	Joe Harbor	
Ready to Rumble	2000	Comedy / Sport	Mr. Boggs	
The Ring	2002	Horror / Thriller	Innkeeper	

=== Television ===
Title	Aired	Genre	Role	Notes
M*A*S*H	1979-12-03	Comedy	Eddie	"Dear Uncle Abdul"
Riding for the Pony Express	1980	Western	Willy Gomes	
Gideon's Trumpet	1980	Drama	Lester Wade	
Death Ray 2000	1981	Action / Fantasy	U.S. Army Enlisted Man	
Johnny Belinda	1982	Drama	Dan	
M*A*S*H	1982-11-01	Comedy	Private Scala	"Trick or Treatment"
Ghost Dancing	1983	Drama	Brian	
Fatal Vision	1984	Drama	MP Captain	
Return to Mayberry	1986	Comedy	Wally Butler	
Matlock	1986	Legal Drama/Mystery	Banning	Pilot
Inherit the Wind	1988	Drama	Sillers	
Blind Vengeance	1990	Drama	Edwin "Ed" Rentzell	
Woman with a Past	1992	Drama	Wayne	
Somebody's Daughter	1992	Crime / Drama	Fielder	
The Stand	1994	Horror / Fantasy	Poke	
The Baby Dance	1998	Drama	Al LeFauve	
The King of Texas	2002	Western / Drama	Warnell	
Star Trek: Enterprise	2003	Sci-Fi	Kessick	"The Xindi"
McBride: Dogged	2007	Mystery	Frank Sinclair	
NCIS	2008; Episode: Heartland	Crime/Drama	Chuck Winslow	
