= KRWP =

KRWP may refer to:

- KRWP (FM), a radio station (103.3 FM) licensed to serve Pampa, Texas, United States; see List of radio stations in Texas
- KIRS (FM), a radio station (107.7 FM) licensed to serve Stockton, Missouri, United States, which held the call sign KRWP from 2005 to 2019
