= WJIC =

Coordinates: 39°58′02″N 82°12′49″W

- Zanesville, Ohio; United States
- Broadcast area: Zanesville - Newark
- Frequency: 91.7 MHz

Programming
- Format: Christian radio
- Network: VCY America

Ownership
- Owner: VCY America; (VCY America, Inc.)

History
- First air date: 1998
- Call sign meaning: Watch, Jesus Is Coming

Technical information
- Licensing authority: FCC
- Facility ID: 85074
- Class: A
- ERP: 6,000 watts
- HAAT: 97 meters (318 ft)

Links
- Public license information: Public file; LMS
- Webcast: Listen live
- Website: http://www.vcyamerica.org/

WJIC is a Christian radio station licensed to Zanesville, Ohio, broadcasting on 91.7 FM. The station is owned by VCY America and carries that network's schedule of Christian programming. WJIC is also heard in the Cambridge, Ohio area on 94.3 FM, through translator station W233AL.

== Translator ==
WJIC is also heard in the Cambridge, Ohio area through a translator on 94.3 FM.

Call sign	Frequency	City of license	FID	ERP (W)	HAAT	Class	FCC info
W232CQ	94.3 FM	Cambridge, Ohio	85648	10	110 m (361 ft)	D	LMS

== See also ==
- VCY America
- Vic Eliason
- List of VCY America Radio Stations
