= KVCE =

- Slaton, Texas; United States
- Broadcast area: Lubbock, Texas
- Frequency: 92.7 MHz
- Branding: VCY America

Programming
- Format: Conservative Christian

Ownership
- Owner: VCY America, Inc.

History
- First air date: April 26, 1978
- Former call signs: KJAK (1978–2019)

Technical information
- Licensing authority: FCC
- Facility ID: 72773
- Class: C1
- ERP: 100,000 watts
- HAAT: 182 meters (597 ft)
- Transmitter coordinates: 33°32′32″N 101°50′14″W

Links
- Public license information: Public file; LMS
- Webcast: Listen Live
- Website: vcyamerica.org

KVCE (92.7 FM) is a radio station licensed to the community of Slaton, Texas, United States, and serving the greater Lubbock, Texas, area. The station is owned by VCY America, Inc. It airs a Conservative Christian radio format.

The station was originally assigned the KJAK call letters by the Federal Communications Commission; it is a Class C1 station.

== History ==
The station signed on as KJAK (Keep Jesus as King) in 1978. Studios were in an old Stucky's located on Slaton Highway between Slaton and Lubbock. The tower was a short distance up the road on Slaton Highway. Program was fed to the tower over leased phone lines.

The station had signal problems and later moved over to 92.9. They later changed to a 100,000 watt signal on 92.7 at the KCBD-TV tower on Avenue A in Lubbock.

The station was founded by Gary L. Acker from Yukon, Oklahoma, (doing business as Faith Broadcasting Service) who owned other small religious stations.

The station was purchased in the early 1980s by Williams Oil Co, who kept station manager Bob Merrill on for a short time. They kept their gospel and contemporary Christian format intact and added some commercial programming like news and weather, Oklahoma football, and they revitalized a long drought of broadcasting high school football in the area. Merrill was replaced by Woody VanDyke during the early 1980s.

Effective January 30, 2019, Williams Oil sold KJAK to VCY America, Inc. for $550,000. The new owners changed the station's call sign to KVCE the same day.
