= KPVL =

- Postville, Iowa; United States
- Broadcast area: Northeast Iowa
- Frequency: 89.1 MHz
- Branding: Christian Information Radio

Programming
- Format: Christian
- Affiliations: VCY America

Ownership
- Owner: American Christian Radio

History
- First air date: December 2002
- Call sign meaning: Postville

Technical information
- Licensing authority: FCC
- Facility ID: 92649
- Class: A
- ERP: 3,000 watts
- HAAT: 75.0 meters (246.1 ft)
- Transmitter coordinates: 43°5′20″N 91°33′54″W

Links
- Public license information: Public file; LMS
- Website: https://www.acr-radio.org/

KPVL (89.1 FM) is a non-commercial Christian radio station licensed to Postville, Iowa, United States.

== History ==
89.1 KPVL went on the air in December 2002. Ownership passed from the City of Postville Chamber to Community Public Media of Iowa City, Iowa. In 2025, KPVL was sold to American Christian Radio for $25,000.
