= KVCI =

Coordinates: 41°12′14.00″N 92°51′17.70″W

- Montezuma, Iowa; United States
- Broadcast area: Central and South Central Iowa
- Frequency: 89.7 MHz
- Branding: VCY America

Programming
- Format: Conservative Christian radio
- Affiliations: VCY America

Ownership
- Owner: VCY America, Inc.

History
- First air date: 2009
- Former call signs: KRNF (2009–2015)

Technical information
- Licensing authority: FCC
- Facility ID: 173311
- Class: C1
- ERP: 100,000 watts
- HAAT: 151 meters (495 ft)

Links
- Public license information: Public file; LMS
- Webcast: Listen Live
- Website: www.vcyamerica.org

KVCI (89.7 FM) is a radio station licensed to Montezuma, Iowa, United States. The station airs a Conservative Christian format, and is an owned and operated affiliate of VCY America.

== History ==
The station began broadcasting in late 2009, and held the call sign KRNF. It was owned by American Radio Missions Foundation and aired a country gospel format branded "God's Country", and carried VCY America's Music 'Til Dawn overnight. In 2015, the station was sold to VCY America for $251,000, and its call sign was changed to KVCI. In 2020, the station's ERP was increased to 100,000 watts, broadcasting from a new location near Bussey, Iowa.
