= Joni (film) =

- Theatrical release poster
- Directed by: James F. Collier
- Screenplay by: James F. Collier
- Based on: Joni: An Unforgettable Story by Joni Eareckson and Joe Musser
- Produced by: Frank R. Jacobson
- Starring: Joni Eareckson Tada
- Cinematography: Frank Raymond
- Edited by: Duane Hartzell
- Music by: Tedd Smith; Rob Tregenza
- Production company: World Wide Pictures
- Distributed by: World Wide Pictures
- Release date: October 24, 1980
- Running time: 107 minutes
- Country: United States
- Language: English
- Budget: $2 million

Joni is a 1980 American independent biographical drama film directed by James F. Collier. It is the true story of Joni Eareckson Tada (played by herself), a seventeen-year-old girl who becomes paralyzed after a diving accident. It is based on her autobiography of the same name. Through her physical, emotional and spiritual struggles, Joni learns to trust in God. Billy Graham financed the film through his company World Wide Pictures and appeared in a cameo.

== Plot ==
In 1967, at age 17, Joni Eareckson is involved in a diving accident that leaves her quadriplegic. As she attempts to come to terms with the reality of her new disability, she seeks the Bible for guidance and her Christian faith grows.

== Cast ==
- Joni Eareckson Tada as herself
- Bert Remsen as John Eareckson
- Katherine De Hetre as Jay Eareckson
- Cooper Huckabee as Dick Filbert
- John Milford as Dr. Sherrill
- Jay W. MacIntosh as Lindy Eareckson
- Louise Hoven as Diana
- Michael Mancini as Don Bertolli
- Richard Lineback as Steve Estes
- Ernie Hudson as Earl
- Betsy Jones-Moreland as Mrs. Barber
- Gwen Van Dam as Nurse Pauline

== Production ==
This film was shot on location at Kernan Hospital and the University of Maryland Hospital in Baltimore, Maryland. In Los Angeles, California, it was shot at Rancho Los Amigos Hospital, Veterans Administration and Wadsworth Hospital Center. This movie was filmed in sequence, to help Joni revisit her events surrounding the injury.

== Release ==
Joni premiered on October 24, 1980, in Los Angeles. It played in New York City on March 4, 1983.

== Reception ==
Janet Maslin of The New York Times wrote the film is made more interesting and poignant by casting Tada as herself. TV Guide rated it 2/4 stars and called Tada "a natural actress".
