= Oscar C. Eliason =

American poet (1902–1985)

Oscar Eliason in an unknown role, undated character portrait.

Oscar C. Eliason (January 6, 1902 – March 1, 1985) was a Swedish American clergyman, who served as a pastor and evangelist in the Assemblies of God, and was a prolific poet and composer, who composed over 50 hymns and gospel songs, including A Name I Highly Treasure and the popular Got Any Rivers?, which influenced another song, God Specializes, commonly regarded as one of the foundational songs of the traditional gospel genre.

== Background ==
Oscar Carl Eliason was born in Nössemark, Dalsland, Sweden, the oldest son of John and Alma Johnson Eliasson, and the brother of Esther Hildegard Eliason Anderson (1899–1966), Paul Pater Eliason (born about 1906 in Sweden; died of tuberculosis in 1929 in Minneapolis, Minnesota). and Earl F. Eliason (born about 1908 in Minnesota). Eliason migrated to the US with his mother, sister and younger brother, Paul, departing Christiania, Norway on 3 July 1908 as a passenger on the Scandinavian American Line's C.F. Tietgen, arriving on 14 July 1908 at Ellis Island, before traveling to Minnesota to join his father, who had migrated in 1906, where he homesteaded a property on Johnson Road, Cook, Minnesota, a lumber town located 95 miles north of Duluth, Minnesota, The Eliason family became members of the Swedish Baptist Church in Cook, Minnesota, which had been established on land donated by the Olson family in 1907. Eliason attended the local one room schoolhouse, where he also learned to speak English, although with an accent that hinted at his Swedish birth. Eliason and his other family members became naturalized US citizens in 1915.

== Career ==
Eliason attended the Northwestern Bible and Missionary Training School in Minneapolis, and graduated in 1929. Soon after Eliason and his brother Paul were diagnosed with tuberculosis, which resulted in their hospitalization at the Glen Lake Sanatorium in Minneapolis, Minnesota. After the death of Paul on 16 June 1929, and the collapse of Eliason's right lung, Eliason was "very depressed and discouraged". After reading accounts of healing in the Pentecostal Evangel, Eliason requested prayer. Eliason credits his healing from tuberculosis to the prayers of a visiting Presbyterian minister. In 1964 Eliason recalled his healing:

During the summer of 1929, after graduating from the Northwestern Bible and Missionary Training School in Minneapolis, I went through some severe testings. My brother passed away, and I, also, became seriously ill and was not expecting to live. During the time that I was attending Northwestern, I had learned to know a Presbyterian minister,- C.K. Ingersol who had great faith in God, especially in praying for the sick. Although the pastor of the First Baptist Church, Dr. W.B. Riley, felt that he, himself, was not gifted along the line of praying for the sick, he knew that prayer for the sick, also, was the duty of the church, and has been neglected down through these last centuries. Therefore, he had asked brother Ingersol to conduct these services every Sunday afternoon in room 118, - one of the Sunday School rooms at the church, and many were the answers to prayer in that room. I had also been reading a paper about answered prayers in many places, and on my sickbed I felt led to send word to brother Ingersol to come and pray for me. The result was that I was healed of tuberculosis.

After his healing, Eliason served as an evangelist and itinerant preacher in the Iron Range area of Minnesota. On 3 October 1936 Eliason married Norma Olson (born about 1911). Among their children were Rev. Victor Carl Eliason (born 14 May 1936 in Fort Dodge, Iowa), a conservative Christian television evangelist, and another son, Verner Paul Eliason (born January 10, 1942, at their home in Cook, Minnesota).

After their marriage Eliason and his wife, Norma, started and co-pastored an Assembly of God church in Huron, South Dakota, and another in Virginia, Minnesota, that affiliated with the Assembly of God denomination in January 1940. Later the Eliasons pastored an Assembly of God church at Fort Dodge, Iowa, before traveling as itinerant music evangelists. When his health forced him to abandon this ministry, Eliason worked as a piano tuner.

Eliason died on 1 March 1985 in Cook, Minnesota.

== Hymns ==
While still a student at the Northwestern Bible and Missionary Training School, Eliason began to write Gospel songs, a practice he continued until old age at the old upright piano in his living room. Eliason was a prolific hymn writer, but his two best-known compositions were Got Any Rivers and A Name I Highly Treasure, which have been included in several hymnals and song books. Other hymns include Soon Jesus Will Come (1958), Wonderful Place of Prayer(1960); "I Fancied I Was in Heaven (1961); "O Why Will Ye Die?" (1961); "Waters of Peace"; "Make My Heart Into a Heaven" (1961); God's Truth Still Marches On, published in Singspiration 11 (1962); and "Good-bye" (1967). Eliason also translated Egon Zandelin's song "Just Believe" from Swedish to English in 1965.

=== "Got Any Rivers" (1931) ===
One of Eliason's best-known compositions is the song "Got Any Rivers", which is also known commonly as "God Satisfies". The chorus was based on part of a poem by Berton Braley called originally "At Your Service: The Panama Gang", that was published as early as 1912, and later as "Ready!". It became "a song that built the Panama Canal, an enthusiastic song that workmen sang everywhere with vim and punch", Braley's poem was widely disseminated and was published in 1914's A Course in Citizenship, a textbook used in the first year in hundreds of American elementary schools. In 1925 the chorus was included as "Song of the Panama Builders" in Lettie Burd Cowman's popular Christian devotional classic Streams in the Desert. During the Great Depression, a triumphalistic anthropocentric version of the song, with the example of the Panama Canal miners cited, was being sung by the delegates at the PCUSA Assembly in 1931: "We specialize on the wholly impossible/ Doing things that no one can do".

In Spring 1931, "as he was getting better he saw an adv[ertisement] in the Minneapolis Star Tribune by a construction company that used the slogan". While acknowledging his indebtedness to the original song, Eliason believed that "only God can say that!" Eliason recalled:

The words of the chorus of this song, although slightly different, originally was a slogan, used by the Construction Company which dug the Panama Canal. The word "God" was not there, but the word "we" was in its place. ... After the healing took place, I felt led to make a slight change in the slogan and write music for it, making it into a gospel chorus. This I did, and it seemed that it was God's plan. I introduced it in North Minneapolis, and in a short while, the chorus was sung all over the English speaking world. So far, it had no verses.

The first two lines of Eliason's chorus were identical to lines in the second stanza of Braley's original. While in Braley's poem the next two lines were: "We make a specialty of the wholly impossible/ Doing things "nobody ever could do'", Eliason changed them to: "God specializes in things tho't impossible;/ He does the things others cannot do." Eliason first performed Got Any Rivers at a home in North Minneapolis in Summer 1931. Two women who performed as the Harmony Twins soon began to sing the song and helped spread it as they traveled from church to church.

As Eliason's chorus spread initially by word of mouth, it was altered in various ways, including the addition of verses not written by Eliason, and inclusion in medleys that convinced many that these were the original verses. By the time Eliason first published the chorus in 1942, various versions of the chorus existed. Consequently, Eliason copyrighted the version that changed the last line to: "And He can do what no other power can do" as it was the best-known, and assigned it to Singspiration Music, where it soon appeared in 1942's Youth for Christ Hymnal. "Got Any Rivers" was sung frequently in Youth For Christ's crusades and rallies.

By February 1943 Eliason's chorus was reported as being popular with Australian troops in Greece and Libya, and was performed in outback Australia. During World War II United States Army Air Corps pilot Lt. Richard L. "Dick" Knautz (born 8 May 1920 in Oregon; died 7 May 1943 in Glenn, California), a former student of the Bob Jones College, then located in Cleveland, Tennessee, accidentally broadcast himself singing the song while flying over Stockton, California, air field, leading to the conversion of five young men. After Knautz's death in an airplane accident in his Vultee BT-13 Valiant while training another pilot over Chico, California, the incident was publicized at The Gideons convention in Modesto, California, in June 1944, reprinted in The Gideon magazine in September 1944, resulting in its reprinting in other religious magazines, including The Pentecostal Evangel in November 1944.

Eliason received orders "from practically every state in the union for the chorus, and some asked for the "whole song;" They were thinking it had verses, This was what finally inspired me to add its verses". With the encouragement of his wife, Norma, Eliason wrote three verses for the song based on the story of Joshua and the crossing of the Jordan River and the conquest of Jericho, which were dedicated to the mother of Dick Knautz. Eliason recalled that "I was asked to tell the story, and Mrs. Eliason was asked to sing the song at Phil Kerr's Monday musical, in the spring of 1955 in the Civic Auditorium in Pasadena, California, after which we were asked to tell the story and sing the song in seven different denominational churches".

"Got Any Rivers" is included in several hymnals and songbooks, including:

- Singspiration No. 4: Gospel Songs and Choruses (1945),;
- Singspiration No. 5: A Collection of Gospel Songs, page 37 (pub.1961) Alfred B. Smith & John W. Peterson. Zondervan Publishing.
- Choruses of Calvary (1952)
- Foursquare Hymnal (1957)
- Country & Western Gospel Hymnal - Vol. 2 (Brentwood Benson, 1980),
- Master Chorus Book (Lillenas, 1988), which sold more than a million copies.
- Praise! Our Songs and Hymns (Brentwood Benson, 1992),
- Great Gospels Songs and Hymns (1992),

In 1958 Mahalia Jackson released this song as the single "Have You Any Rivers?" through Columbia Records (Columbia 41258) and also in Australia through Coronet Records (KS-283 Others who recorded this song included:

- Jimmy Swaggart - It Matters To Him About You (1990) (Jim Records 02–155)

==== "God Specializes" (1958) ====
Eliason's chorus was incorporated into the song God Specializes, with some additional words and a new tune both written by Gloria Griffin, and arranged by Roberta Martin. "God Specializes" was recorded in July 1958 as the first single of The Roberta Martin Singers (with Gloria Griffin singing lead) released by Savoy Records (Savoy 4103) in October 1958. Among those who also recorded this song was James Cleveland and the Cleveland Singers (Savoy MG-14265). American operatic soprano Leontyne Price indicates that her first solo was singing "God Specializes" as a member of the Young Adult Choir at the Beulah Baptist church in Elmwood, Illinois. Also in 1958 Rev. F.L. Johnson & the Young Adult and Senior Choirs released a version on E.L. Thomas' new Chicago-based Pink Cloud Records (Pink Clouds 225).

=== "A Name I Highly Treasure" (1946) ===
One of Eliason's friends, Nazarene music publisher Haldor Lillenas, bought Eliason's song "A Name I Highly Treasure" in 1946 for $400 and published it in several Nazarene song books and hymnals. Cliff Barrows and the Billy Graham Crusade Choir sang "A Name I Highly Treasure" at a Billy Graham crusade in Minneapolis attended by Eliason. According to his granddaughter, "It was a thrill for him to hear the song "A Name I Highly Treasure" sung by that huge choir."

Among those who have recorded this song are:

- Northlanders of Sweden - Sacred Songs by the Northlanders of Sweden (Christian Faith/ Alma Records NS-1241);
- Earle Anderson with Rudy Atwood & Ralph Carmichael String Quartet - Earle Anderson, Baritone (Alma Records EA-4075; Christian Faith 285);
- Sherrill Nielsen - A Name I Highly Treasure (1957).
- Paul McNutt with Rudy Atwood and Lorin Whitney - Paul McNutt, Baritone (1958) (Alma Records PM-7083; Christian Faith 291);
- The Hawaiians - The Hawaiians (1973) (Tempo R7054);
- Bonnie Lee [Lamb] - I've Learned to Know A Name I Highly Treasure (West Minist'r Sound LP S 261-02 LP).

"A Name I Highly Treasure" is included in the following hymnals and songbooks:

- Singspiration Vol. 6 (Zondervan, 1951);
- Songs that Touch the Heart Vol. 2 (Singspiration/ Zondervan 1954);
- Chorus Choir Voices No. 2 (Lillenas, 1957);
- Special Songs for Special Singers Number 2 (Benson, 1958);
- Worship in Song (Lillenas, 1972);
- Sing to the Lord (Lillenas, 1993)

== Poetry ==
Eliason was a prolific poet. Included among his poems are "A Voice From Hell" and "The Modernist Preacher Entering Hell," which criticized ministers who preached liberal Christianity.
