= KVPW =

Coordinates: 33.801°N 116.225°W

- Mecca, California; United States
- Broadcast area: Coachella Valley - Palm Springs
- Frequency: 97.7 MHz
- Branding: VCY America

Programming
- Format: Christian radio
- Affiliations: VCY America

Ownership
- Owner: VCY America

History
- First air date: June 20, 2001; 24 years ago
- Former call signs: KRCK-FM (1999–2024)

Technical information
- Licensing authority: FCC
- Facility ID: 52808
- Class: A
- ERP: 1,600 watts
- HAAT: 174 meters (571 ft)
- Translator: 98.1 K251BX (Palm Desert)

Links
- Public license information: Public file; LMS
- Webcast: Listen Live
- Website: vcy.org

KVPW (97.7 MHz) is a non-commercial, listener-supported radio station licensed to Mecca, California, and broadcasting to the Coachella Valley including Palm Springs. It is an owned and operated affiliate of VCY America, based in Wisconsin. KVPW airs a Christian radio format, including talk and teaching programs with soft Christian music. VCY America holds periodic fundraisers on the air and seeks donations on its website.

KVPW is a Class A FM station with an effective radiated power (ERP) of 1,600 watts. The transmitter is in Indio Hills, in a mountain range near Joshua Tree National Park. Programming is also heard on 158-watt FM translator K251BX at 98.1 MHz in Palm Desert.

== History ==
=== Early years ===
The Federal Communications Commission held a spectrum auction for the 97.7 frequency in Mecca in the late 1990s. It issued a construction permit to the winning bidder, Playa del Sol Broadcasters, on April 7, 1998. During construction, the station was assigned the KRCK-FM call sign on February 1, 1999. The station received its broadcast license in summer 2001.

On June 20, 2001, KRCK-FM signed on the air. The station originally had an 1980s rock format branded as "K-Rock", but was ordered to drop the use of the slogan due to a possible trademark infringement with 106.7 KROQ-FM of Pasadena. It kept the rock format for five years.

=== Top 40-CHR era ===
KRCK-FM flipped to Top 40 (CHR) in the summer of 2006. It began calling itself "Hot 97.7." For the first 18 months, the DJs consisted of Kid Corona in afternoon drive and Chase Martinez in nights, with the station being automated for the remaining dayparts. In 2007, the station introduced new sonic imaging and rebranded as "Hot Hits 97.7 KRCK". In 2010, it rebranded again as "Hot 97.7 KRCK".

In 2016, the station was sold to Major Market Radio LLC, a subsidiary of Royce International Broadcasting Corporation. Royce International was led by radio entrepreneur Ed Stolz, former owner of what is now KEXC. The sale was approved on July 26, and was consummated on the 29th.

In 2018, KRCK-FM placed its new HD radio transmitter on the air, adding a talk radio format on the HD2 subchannel. FM translators at 98.1 MHz and on 95.5 FM in the Coachella area were set up to relay the talk format, which itself was a simulcast of Las Vegas station KBET. The agreement was nullified after the VCY LMA came into effect.

=== ASCAP lawsuit and attempted receivership sale ===
From April 2016 to June 2018, on behalf of W.B. Music and other music companies, ASCAP successfully sued Royce International Broadcasting Corp. and its subsidiaries for copyright infringement. The result was a $330,000 judgment, increased to over $1.3 million with attorney fees and sanctions.

When the defendants were unable to pay, KRCK-FM was transferred into a court-ordered receivership controlled by broker Larry Patrick on July 6, 2020. Also included were two other Top 40-CHR stations mentioned in the lawsuit, KFRH in Las Vegas and KREV-FM in San Francisco.

The court order appointing the receiver authorized Larry Patrick to take control of the three named FM radio stations, and to "solicit offers for the sale of Defendants’ Radio Stations’ assets." However, that appointment order did not give Mr. Patrick control of the business entities. On December 30, 2020, it was announced that VCY America would acquire the three stations.

On March 15, 2021, after Judge Jesus Bernal denied Stolz' bid to end the receivership and have the stations returned to him, VCY America began operating the three stations under a local marketing agreement (LMA) while the sale of the stations was being finalized.

On January 31, 2022, federal Judge August B. Landis apparently quashed the sale of the stations by ordering Receiver Larry Patrick to turn over control of KRCK-FM (and Stolz's other two FM stations) back to Stolz's companies. The agreement with Larry Patrick was dissolved. The radio station was taken off the air, and its website suspended.

=== VCY ownership ===
In October 2023, VCY America participated in a bankruptcy auction for these stations and was the winning bidder for KFRH, KRCK-FM and its two translators in the Palm Springs area for $2,445,952.88.

The station changed its call sign to KVPW on February 9, 2024. In May 2024 it became an affiliate of VCY America, broadcasting the network's Christian programming.
