= WVCY (AM) =

- Oshkosh, Wisconsin; United States
- Frequency: 690 kHz

Programming
- Format: Christian
- Network: VCY America

Ownership
- Owner: VCY America
- Sister stations: WVFL, WVCY-FM

History
- First air date: July 1, 1969
- Former call signs: WAGO (1969–-1983); WCKK (1983–1987); WLKE (1987–1992); WXOL (1992–1995)
- Call sign meaning: Wisconsin Voice of Christian Youth

Technical information
- Licensing authority: FCC
- Facility ID: 69836
- Class: D
- Power: 250 watts (day); 77 watts (night)
- Transmitter coordinates: 44.0809°N 88.5646°W
- Translators: 99.9 W260DL (Oshkosh); 105.1 W286DS (Appleton)

Links
- Public license information: Public file; LMS
- Webcast: Listen live
- Website: www.vcyamerica.org

WVCY (690 AM) is a noncommercial radio station licensed to Oshkosh, Wisconsin, United States. It is owned by VCY America based in Milwaukee and broadcasts a Christian format. Nearly all of WVCY's schedule is from the national network.

WVCY is also heard on two FM translators: in Oshkosh at 99.9 MHz and in Appleton at 105.1 MHz.

== History ==
The station began broadcasting on July 1, 1969. Its original call sign was WAGO. The station featured a Middle of the Road (MOR) music format. Old Time Radio dramas such as The Shadow, and news from the American Entertainment Radio Network were also on the schedule.

By 1976, the station had begun airing a Top 40 format. In 1983, the station's call sign was changed to WCKK, and it aired the Music of Your Life pop standards format, as "Cake Radio". From 1987 to 1992, the station held the call letters WLKE, initially simulcasting 1170 WLKD as "The Lake", playing music from the 1950s, 1960s, and 1970s. The call letters were changed to WXOL under the ownership of area disc jockey Steve Rose from 1992 to 1995, and the station was branded as "Excellent Oldies" during this period, airing an oldies format.

In 1995, the station was sold to VCY America for $190,000. Its call sign was changed to WVCY. The new owners switched it to a Christian format.

== Programming ==
WVCY has a format of Christian talk and teaching programs daily; WVCY also airs a variety of vocal and instrumental traditional Christian music, as well as children's programming such as Ranger Bill.

== See also ==
- VCY America
- Vic Eliason
- List of VCY America Radio Stations
