= Robert Wolgemuth =

American author and business executive (1948–2026)

- Born: Robert David Wolgemuth; February 28, 1948
- Died: January 10, 2026 (aged 77)
- Occupations: Literary agent, author
- Known for: Author, owner of Wolgemuth & Associates
- Spouse(s): Nancy Leigh DeMoss (m. 2015); Barbara Jean "Bobbie" Gardner (m. 1970; died 2014)
- Children: 2
- Parent(s): Samuel Wolgemuth, Grace Dourte

Robert David Wolgemuth (February 28, 1948 – January 10, 2026) was an American author who was the chairman of the Evangelical Christian Publishers Association. Wolgemuth authored over 20 books and was in the publishing business for more than 40 years. Five of his books have received Silver Medallion Awards from the Evangelical Christian Publishers Association. His best-selling books include She Calls Me Daddy and The Most Important Place on Earth.

Wolgemuth headed the literary agency Wolgemuth & Associates, Inc., which represents over 100 authors. He graduated with a degree in Biblical Literature from Taylor University in 1969, and received an honorary doctorate (Doctor of Humane Letters) from Taylor in 2005.

Wolgemuth died on January 10, 2026, at the age of 77.

== Written works (partial list) ==
- She Calls Me Daddy: Seven Things Every Man Needs to Know About Building a Complete Daughter (1996)
- The Devotional Bible for Dads (1999)
- Pray with Me Daddy: Conversations with God for Dads and Daughters (1999)
- Daddy@Work: Loving Your Family, Loving Your Job...Being Your Best in Both Worlds (2002)
- O Worship the King: Hymns of Praise and Assurance to Encourage Your Heart, co-authored with John F. MacArthur, Joni Eareckson Tada, and Bobbie Wolgemuth (2000)
- What's in the Bible: A One-Volume Guidebook to God's Word, co-authored with R.C. Sproul (2001)
- What Wondrous Love Is This: Hymns of Wonder and Worship to Remember His Love, co-authored with John F. MacArthur, Joni Eareckson Tada, and Bobbie Wolgemuth (2002)
- When Morning Gilds the Skies: Hymns of Heaven and Our Eternal Hope, co-authored with John F. MacArthur, Joni Eareckson Tada, and Bobbie Wolgemuth (2002)
- Prayers from a Dad's Heart (2003)
- Dad's Prayer Journal: A Guided Journal (2004)
- How to Lead Your Child to Christ, co-authored with Bobbie Wolgemuth (2005)
- 7 Things You Better Have Nailed Down Before All Hell Breaks Loose (2007)
- Dad's Bible: The Father's Plan (2007)
- Fathers of the Bible: A Devotional (2008)
- She Still Calls Me Daddy: Building a New Relationship with Your Daughter After You Walk Her Down the Aisle (2009)
- The Father's Plan: A Bible Study for Dads (2010)
- Letters to God Bible (2010)
- Couples of the Bible: A One-Year Devotional Study to Draw You Closer to God and Each Other, co-authored with Bobbie Wolgemuth (2013)
- Dad's Devotional Bible (2015)
- Like the Shepherd: Leading Your Marriage with Love and Grace (Hardcover) (2017)
