= KIRS (FM) =

- Stockton, Missouri; United States
- Frequency: 107.7 MHz

Programming
- Format: Christian

Ownership
- Owner: VCY America, Inc.

History
- First air date: January 20, 1999
- Former call signs: KRLK (1998–2005); KRWP (2005–2019)

Technical information
- Licensing authority: FCC
- Facility ID: 78693
- Class: C3
- ERP: 11,700 watts
- HAAT: 146 meters (479 ft)
- Transmitter coordinates: 37°31′25″N 93°52′41″W

Links
- Public license information: Public file; LMS
- Webcast: Listen live
- Website: vcyamerica.org

KIRS is a radio station licensed to Stockton, Missouri, broadcasting on 107.7 FM. The station is owned by VCY America, Inc.

== History ==
The station signed on January 20, 1999, as KRLK, broadcasting a classic country format branded as "The Lake". Cumulus Media bought the station from Galen Gilbert for $850,000 in 2004. The call letters changed to KRWP on February 2, 2005. The station initially relied on programming from Jones Radio Networks; in later years, KRWP was a full service station, with classic country music being supplemented with a tradio program and high school sports coverage.

Cumulus' acquisition of the station was part of its plan to move KMAJ-FM, a Topeka, Kansas, radio station it owned on the same frequency, to the Kansas City market, which would have required KRWP to reduce its power. The KMAJ-FM move was called off in 2006, after Cumulus' purchase of Susquehanna Radio Corporation, as the move would have given it too many FM radio stations in Kansas City.

On January 17, 2018, KRWP went off the air without any notice from Cumulus. Cumulus had earlier indicated that, following the Federal Communications Commission's repeal of rules requiring a local main studio, KRWP would close its local facilities and transfer its operations to Cumulus' Kansas City studios. VCY America agreed to buy the station for $100,000 on September 19, 2018; upon the completion of the sale, the station would convert to noncommercial operation and broadcast VCY's Christian radio programming. The sale was consummated on January 10, 2019, at which point VCY America changed the station's call sign to KIRS.
