= WVCY-TV =

Television station in Milwaukee

- Milwaukee, Wisconsin; United States
- Channels: Digital: 31 (UHF), shared with WITI; Virtual: 30
- Branding: TV-30

Programming
- Affiliations: 30.1: Religious independent

Ownership
- Owner: VCY America, Inc.
- Sister stations: WVCY-FM

History
- First air date: January 11, 1983
- Former channel numbers: Analog: 30 (UHF, 1983–2009); Digital: 22 (UHF, 2006–2018), 33 (UHF, 2018–2019); Translator: W04CW 4 Tigerton/Marion (analog)
- Former affiliations: FamilyNet (until 2009)
- Call sign meaning: Wisconsin Voice of Christian Youth

Technical information
- Licensing authority: FCC
- Facility ID: 72342
- ERP: 1,000 kW
- HAAT: 316 m (1,037 ft)
- Transmitter coordinates: 43°5′26″N 87°53′50″W
- Translator(s): W26EE-D Wittenberg

Links
- Public license information: Public file; LMS
- Website: www.vcy.org/tv30, vcy.tv

WVCY-TV (channel 30) is a religious independent television station in Milwaukee, Wisconsin, United States, owned by locally based VCY America, Inc. The station's studios are located on West Vliet Street in Milwaukee. Through a channel sharing agreement with Fox owned-and-operated station WITI (channel 6), WVCY-TV transmits using WITI's spectrum from an antenna on East Capitol Drive (just north of WIS 190) in Shorewood.

== History ==
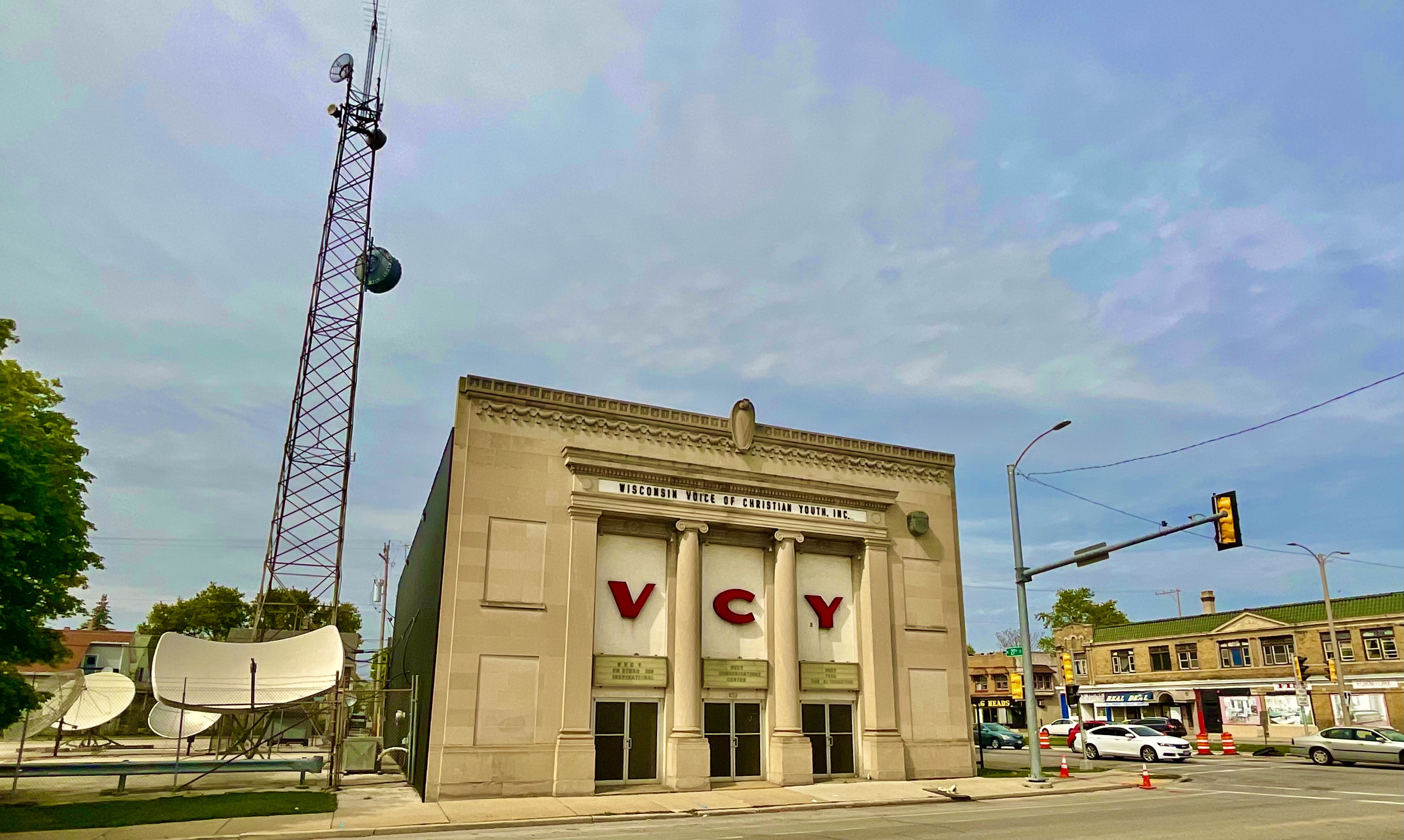
WVCY's actual studio facility for channel 30 and 107.7 FM is based a mile northeast of the VCY America building.

The station first signed on the air on January 11, 1983; it has operated as a religious station since its sign-on.

=== Attempted purchase by CBS ===
On May 23, 1994, Fox signed an affiliation deal with New World Communications to shift the network affiliations of the company's stations in 12 markets to Fox starting in the fall of 1994. Locally, the deal included WITI, which would switch from CBS to Fox in December 1994. With only months to find an affiliate, CBS approached WVCY's owners to purchase the station and make it an owned-and-operated station of that network. Offers to affiliate with the network had already been turned down by NBC affiliate WTMJ-TV (channel 4), ABC affiliate WISN-TV (channel 12, which had been affiliated with CBS from 1961 to 1977), WVTV (channel 18; which had earlier been a CBS owned-and-operated station in the 1950s), WCGV-TV (channel 24) and WJJA (channel 49, now WMLW-TV).

The board of VCY America, along with station founder and VCY America chairman Vic Eliason, decided to reject the offer and retain ownership of the station. Eliason cited a number of factors. He claimed CBS' $10 million offer was "unreasonably low". He added that on a more fundamental level, he believed selling to a commercial operator, let alone a commercial network, "would be an act of consummate irresponsibility and a betrayal of trust for all our faithful supporters who believe in Christian family values", especially given that channel 30 billed itself as "an alternative to the swill that passes as network television". Even if Eliason had been willing to sell, at the time WVCY-TV leased space on WCGV's tower under a non-compete clause that precluded WVCY's operation as a commercial station as long as it transmitted from the site. Had CBS bought the station, it would have had to either find a new transmitter site or pay a substantial fee to WCGV's owners to nullify the non-compete clause.

Ultimately, CBS aligned itself with then low-profile independent WDJT-TV (channel 58), which had also initially declined an offer to affiliate with CBS, just days before WITI switched to Fox.

== Programming ==
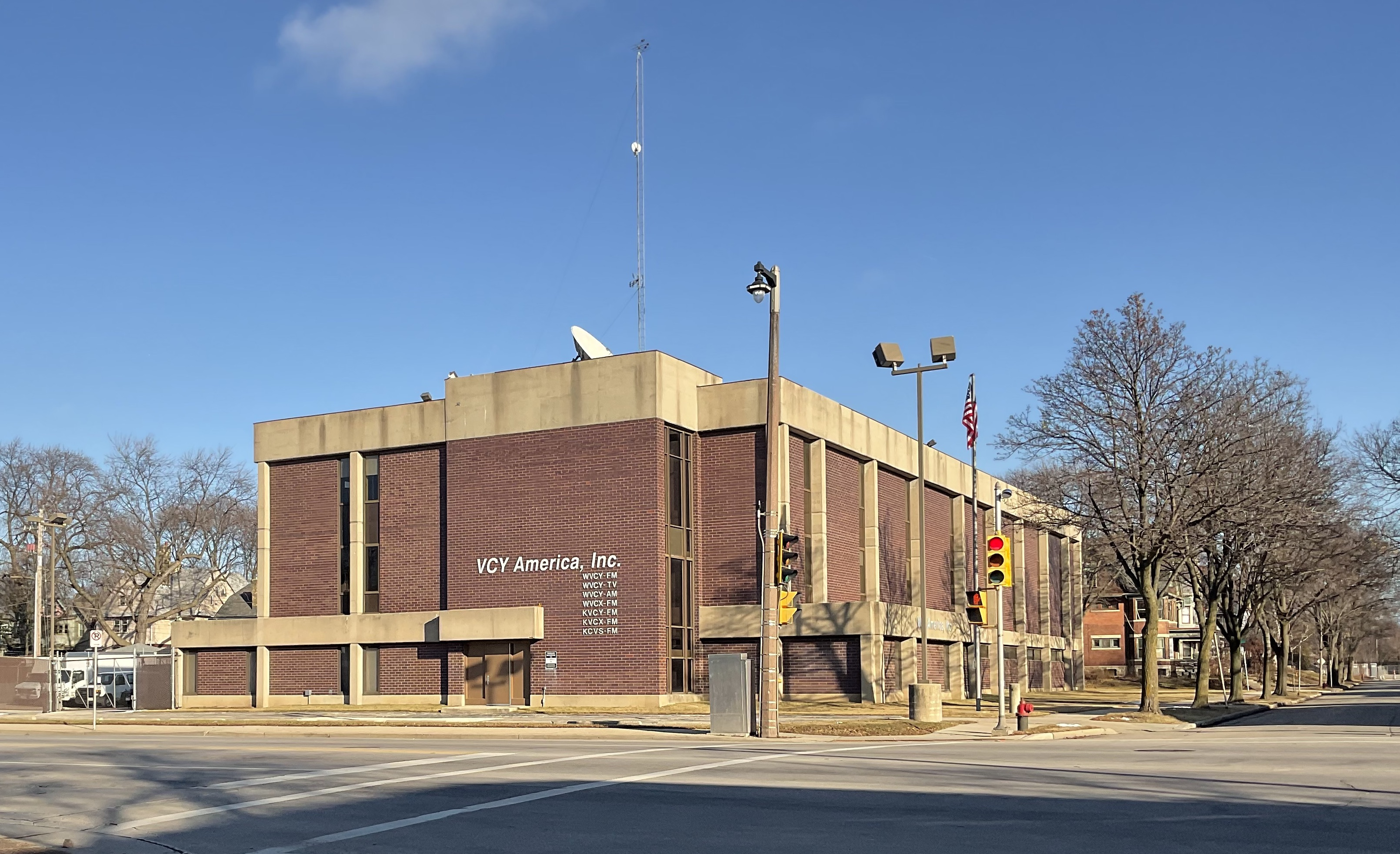
VCY America's studio building in the Miller Valley neighborhood of Milwaukee.

Although WVCY is licensed as a commercial station, it operates on a noncommercial basis. Rather than accept advertising, VCY America asks for viewer support through donations via the station, purchases through its religious bookstore in Wauwatosa and associated online store, and fundraising appeals on VCY America Radio. Unlike other religious television stations, it does not carry contemporary Christian music programming (to the point of dropping any program that uses it for theme music), or signs and wonders televangelists (such as Benny Hinn). The station is unique for carrying a top-of-the-hour text weather forecast as part of its station identification, a practice long discontinued by most commercial television stations.

The station aired programming from FamilyNet (forerunner to the current day Cowboy Channel) from before the network's 2009 purchase by a company owned by televangelist Robert A. Schuller and subsequent 2013 conversion into a secular classic television and rural living service by the Rural Media Group, reflecting that network's previously religious roots; FamilyNet shows and films airing on WVCY show the network's pre-2008 logo, suggesting they were recorded before then and retained in the station's tape archive for later use. VCY America's radio network has also discontinued programs or affiliations in the past that have changed to more "mainstream" religious views or have financial appeals that go beyond the conservative views of VCY. WVCY-TV also carries a disclaimer on CBN News broadcasts stating that CBN's views are not those of VCY America. A limited amount of programming from the Christian Television Network also airs on the station.

WVCY also carries some government hearings and presidential speeches, along with simulcasts of state political debates and the State of the State address produced by the state's public television organizations, and is the last commercial station in the state to continue to program weekday afternoon children's programming, a block that includes a rotation of series including Davey and Goliath, Becky's Barn and Sunshine Factory.

Besides Wisconsin Public Television's stations during school recesses and vacations, WVCY was the final commercial station in the state until the start of 2010 to sign off the air on a nightly basis.

== Technical information ==
=== Subchannel ===
Subchannels of WITI and WVCY-TV
License	Subchannel	Res.	Short name	Programming
WITI	6.1	720p	WITI-DT	Fox
WITI	6.2	480i	ANT-TV	Antenna TV
WITI	6.3	480i	HSN	HSN
WITI	6.4	480i	FOX WX	Fox Weather
WVCY-TV	30.1	720p	WVCY-TV	Main WVCY-TV programming

=== Analog-to-digital conversion ===
WVCY-TV shut down its analog signal, over UHF channel 30, on February 17, 2009, the original date on which full-power television stations in the United States were to transition from analog to digital broadcasts under federal mandate. The station's digital signal continued to broadcasts on its pre-transition UHF channel 22, using virtual channel 30. For fifteen years after, the station continued to broadcast in standard definition format, meaning current-day programming filmed in widescreen high-definition was carried in a reduced letterboxed format.

=== Spectrum sale and WITI channel sharing arrangement ===
On April 13, 2017, the results of the FCC's 2016 spectrum auction were announced, with VCY America successfully selling the UHF spectrum for WVCY for $76.3 million. WVCY did not leave the air, arranging to share a channel with then Tribune Broadcasting-owned WITI (now a Fox-owned station), with the existing WVCY schedule retained under their existing numbering and identification as channel 30.1 and being associated under the WVCY calls. Along with three other stations in the market, WVCY transitioned to their new arrangement on January 8, 2018. The proceeds from the spectrum sale have since been used to expand VCY's radio presence nationwide, with several station acquisitions in major markets, including New York, the Dallas–Fort Worth metroplex, Phoenix, and Albuquerque.

=== High definition ===
On September 25, 2024, the station began to broadcast in high definition for the first time and continues to carry no additional digital subchannels.

=== Translator ===
WVCY-TV operates one translator in northern Wisconsin:

City of license	Callsign	Channel	ERP	HAAT	Facility ID	Transmitter coordinates
Wittenberg	W26EE-D	26	15 kW	155 m (509 ft)	189397	44°57′53.9″N 89°00′18.4″W

== Former sister stations ==
WVCY formerly had a sister station in the Green Bay market, Suring-licensed WSCO (channel 14), which VCY America owned from 1993 to 1997. That year, VCY sold WSCO to Paxson Communications (the forerunner to Ion Media Networks) in order to concentrate on its Milwaukee operations (that station is now WCWF, which serves as Green Bay's CW affiliate).

In 1980, VCY was granted a construction permit to operate a station on UHF channel 43 in Tomah under the callsign WVCX-TV, which would serve the La Crosse–Eau Claire market. However, that construction permit expired in 1985, with W43BR in Baraboo eventually broadcasting over that channel space.

In 2008, VCY acquired W04CW (channel 4) in Tigerton–Marion, an area located between Green Bay and Wausau well outside of the Milwaukee market, which is used as a repeater of WVCY's programming. On July 18, 2012, VCY America was granted a digital broadcast license for W26EE-D (UHF 26 / virtual 30) in Wittenberg, Wisconsin. W04CW's license was returned for cancellation on February 5, 2019.
