= KBET (AM) =

Coordinates: 36°6′35.9″N 115°00′14″W

- Winchester, Nevada; United States
- Broadcast area: Las Vegas Valley
- Frequency: 790 kHz
- Branding: 103.1 & 790AM The Hu$tle

Programming
- Format: Urban contemporary

Ownership
- Owner: AutoPilotFM LLC

History
- First air date: May 22, 2006

Technical information
- Licensing authority: FCC
- Facility ID: 136292
- Class: D
- Power: 500 watts (day only)
- Translator: 103.1 K276GX (Las Vegas)

Links
- Public license information: Public file; LMS
- Webcast: Listen Live
- Website: facebook.com/TheHustle1031

KBET (790 AM, "103.1FM & 790AM The Hu$tle") is a commercial radio station licensed to Winchester, Nevada, United States, and broadcasting to the Las Vegas Valley. It features an urban contemporary format. It is currently owned by AutoPilotFM LLC, and has studios in the unincorporated Clark County community of Enterprise.

KBET's transmitter is off Telephone Pole Road in Whitney, Nevada. KBET is also heard on FM translator 103.1 MHz K276GX in Las Vegas.

== History ==
On May 22, 2006, the station first signed on the air. Diamond Broadcasting spent $2.5 million to acquire the station's construction permit before it even was on the air.

On May 29, 2009, the Las Vegas Sun reported that the station had been sold to Silver State Communications LLC, and that the format would be changed to Sports radio. KBET later aired a Classic Country format, using the slogan: "Country Legends 790."

Previous logo

KBET began broadcasting a talk format on April 19, 2012. It carried nationally syndicated conservative talk shows most of the day, mainly from Westwood One. Shows included Chris Plante, Dan Bongino and "Red Eye Radio." In addition, "Armstrong & Getty" from KSTE Sacramento was heard in morning drive time. Alex Jones from the Genesis Communications Network aired early weekday and weekend mornings and Ground Zero with Clyde Lewis was heard in late evenings. Most hours began with an update from Fox News Radio.

In 2024, the station was off the air for a period of time as Autopilot FM made plans to start an urban contemporary format on the signal. The main goal was to feed the FM translator, giving listeners in Las Vegas an FM station playing hip hop music and recent urban hits.
