= Vic Eliason =

American evangelical clergyman

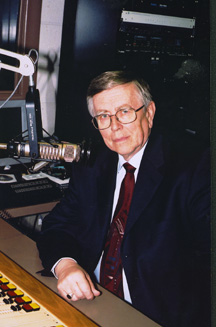
- Born: Victor Carl Eliason; May 14, 1936; Fort Dodge, Iowa, U.S.
- Died: December 5, 2015 (aged 79); Milwaukee, Wisconsin, U.S.
- Education: Bob Jones University (honorary)
- Occupations: Clergyman, radio personality
- Years active: 1959–2011
- Known for: VCY America Radio Network
- Spouse: Freda Eliason
- Children: 3
- Parent(s): Oscar C. Eliason; Norma Olson

Victor Carl "Vic" Eliason (May 14, 1936 – December 5, 2015) was an American evangelical clergyman who founded the VCY America Radio Network, a conservative Christian broadcasting ministry, based in Milwaukee, along with Milwaukee television station WVCY-TV.

== Early life ==
Victor Carl Eliason was born on May 14, 1936 in Fort Dodge, Iowa, the son of lay preacher, Oscar C. Eliason, who served with the Swedish Baptist Church and the Assemblies of God, and Norma Olson (born 1911). Eliason attended Open Bible College, in Des Moines, Iowa. After serving as an associate pastor in Des Moines, Iowa, Eliason was ordained in a non-denominational church, in October 1957.

== Career ==
In 1959 Eliason and his wife, Freda (born February 13, 1935), moved to Milwaukee, Wisconsin. In 1960, Eliason became interim director of the Milwaukee, Wisconsin chapter of Youth for Christ. In May 1961 the organization went on the air with Voice of Christian Youth, a 30-minute youth-oriented radio show over WBON-FM in Milwaukee. Soon after the ministry had expanded to a full broadcast day, resulting in 1970 in VCY purchasing WBON for $315,000 and renaming it WVCY-FM.

In 1973, Eliason led the Milwaukee Youth for Christ chapter out of the national organization, renaming it "Voice of Christian Youth." Now known as VCY America, it is a Christian broadcasting ministry based in Milwaukee. VCY currently oversees 15-20 stations mostly across the Upper Midwest, depending on the source, not including its Internet site or a 24-hour-a-day, seven days a week, television station in Milwaukee, which is WVCY-TV, launched in 1983, as well as several "translator" and "satellator" stations. VCY America also provides programming via satellite to stations around the country. The ministry is funded through listeners' and supporters' donations.

Eliason was a prominent on-air personality for the network, with duties including being one of the regular hosts for the network's morning public affairs program, VCY Today and the afternoon news program, Crosstalk. Eliason also provided the voiceovers for the network's overnight music program, Music 'Til Dawn, which features "mostly conservative, ministry-oriented inspirational music", where tunes are interspersed with verses from the Bible and commentary.

In 1978, Eliason established the Voice of Christian Youth school, a private Christian K-12 School at 3434 W. Kilbourn Avenue, Milwaukee. In the early 1990s, the Voice of Christian Youth School merged with Faith Christian Academy and the name of the school was formally changed to Badger State Baptist School, and was relocated to 1170 W. Windlake Ave, Milwaukee.

In 1983, Eliason started WVCY-TV on Channel 30 in Milwaukee. In September 1994, the WVCY-TV board rejected a purchase offer of $10 million from CBS as part of that network's attempt to find a new station in the market (CBS eventually affiliated with WDJT-TV).

=== Crosstalk ===
In 1976 Eliason started Crosstalk, a radio talk show he hosted. Even as other hosts joined, Vic would still sit in on various days for Crosstalk until he died in 2015. Crosstalk, the network's nationally broadcast weekday afternoon public affairs program, airs live on over 125 stations and is rebroadcast weekday evenings on the VCY Radio Network; one of those broadcasts is also replayed at noon (CDT) on Saturday as Best of Crosstalk.

Topics range from "the economy, the political scene, the continuing moral collapse of our nation, legislation that affects the family, or the state of evangelicalism.".

== Controversy ==
=== Julie Brienza ===
In April 1990, Julie Brienza attempted to contact Eliason for a free-lance article on "hate radio" for The Washington Blade, a gay newspaper in Washington, D.C. When Eliason returned the call, Julie answered "UPI, Julie Brienza." Eliason, at that time a UPI customer, complained to UPI that their employee was attacking a customer with company resources. He then began a national campaign that resulted in Brienza's employment being terminated in April 1990 because "she had improperly used UPI equipment to do personal freelance work unrelated to her job with the wire service". After Brienza was fired, Eliason stated during his radio show that "'Christianity has triumphed". Later in 1990, Brienza filed a US$12.75 million lawsuit against UPI and Eliason for "unlawful job termination" based on her sexual orientation. To settle the case, in April 1995, Eliason's insurance agreed to pay Brienza $255,000, and Eliason issued a statement that gays and lesbians have the right to work in the media. Eliason said "My concern in this matter from the very beginning has been objectivity in journalism, not the sexual preference of any individual in the media."

=== Rembert Weakland ===
Eliason was vociferous in his opposition to Rembert Weakland, the Roman Catholic Archbishop of Milwaukee from 1977 until 2002, "whom Eliason regarded as a "liberal" for his views on homosexuality and sex education". Weakland's eventual retirement was overshadowed by revelations that Weakland paid $450,000 of diocesan funds to a former male lover to prevent a lawsuit, along with the ongoing Catholic Church sexual abuse cases hidden under Weakland's leadership which ended up bankrupting the Archdiocese of Milwaukee.

== Personal ==
Eliason was married to Freda M. Eliason (born 1935), and the father of three adult children - Andrew Carl Eliason (born about 1964), who is employed as an engineer at VCY; Ingrid J. Schlueter (born about 1966), former producer and co-host of the Crosstalk radio talk show on the VCY America Radio Network (resigned from VCY America in May 2011); and Lisa C. Eliason (born about 1968), both of whom formerly worked at the radio ministry.

Eliason was the recipient of an honorary Doctorate of Laws degree given at the 74th Annual Commencement exercises of Bob Jones University in May 2001. He was also a licensed pilot. He died of cancer on December 5, 2015, at the age of 79.

- Vic Eliason.org - Biography of Vic Eliason
- VCY America
