= Nancy DeMoss Wolgemuth =

American author and radio host

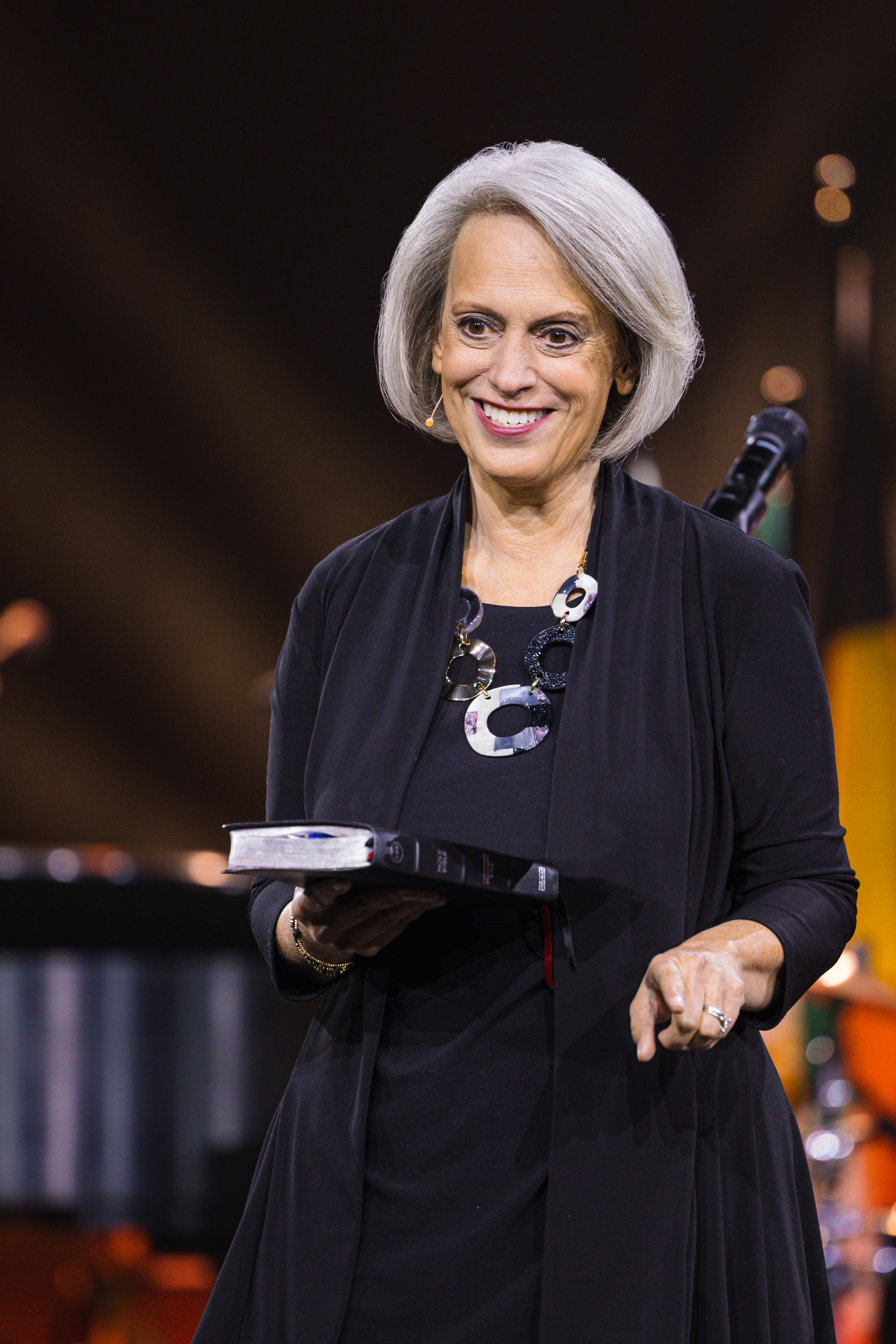
Image of Nancy DeMoss Wolgemuth

Nancy DeMoss Wolgemuth (born September 3, 1958), also known as Nancy Leigh DeMoss, is a prominent Bible teacher, public speaker and founder of Revive Our Hearts ministry for women. In 2015, DeMoss married best-selling author and a former president of Thomas Nelson Publishers, Robert Wolgemuth.

DeMoss Wolgemuth has two nationally syndicated audio programs for women, Revive Our Hearts and Seeking Him, produced in Spanish and English on 1,100 radio outlets daily. Wolgemuth is a best-selling Christian author of over twenty books and Bible studies. Her books have sold more than four million copies, including bestselling Lies Women Believe and 2018 Christian Book Award winner, Adorned. Popular hymn writer Kristyn Getty said of Adorned, "Nancy's practical insight, ageless wisdom, and warm fervor rang like bells through my spirit as I read this book. ...[Expressing how] womanhood is beautified and can blossom in a multigenerational community of women following the Lord day by day together."

In 2021 Wolgemuth was selected as general editor for the Christian Standard Bible, study Bible. The project is in partnership with Holman Bibles.

Much of her Revive Our Hearts ministry content has been translated into over a dozen languages by international teams and volunteers. She has ministries in the German, French, Indonesian, Portuguese and Persian languages and hosted events in the United States and abroad. Wolgemuth is also active in the True Woman movement which promotes a return to “Biblical womanhood.”

== Life ==
Nancy Leigh DeMoss Wolgemuth was born September 3, 1958 to Arthur S. and Nancy S. DeMoss. She was raised in Philadelphia, Pennsylvania in a family committed to world evangelism. At a young age, she became a Christian.

With an interest in music, she graduated from the University of Southern California with a degree in piano performance. Since 1980 she has served on the staff of Life Action Ministries, Niles, Michigan, and for years was Director of Women's Ministries and editor of Spirit of Revival magazine.

Elisabeth Elliot was instrumental in her life as a friend and mentor. Following in her footsteps, she started Revive Our Hearts in 2001, carrying over from Elisabeth Elliot's program, Gateway to Joy.

On November 14, 2015, Nancy married Robert Wolgemuth, author and former chairman of the Evangelical Christian Publishers Association. A widower, Dr. Wolgemuth had two grown daughters, five grandchildren and two great-grandchildren. The couple lived in southwest Michigan. He died at the age of 77 on January 10, 2026.

=== DeMoss family ===
Nancy Leigh DeMoss Wolgemuth was born to Arthur S. DeMoss (c.1926-1979) and Nancy Sossomon DeMoss (b.1938). They had seven children, and raised their family with a focus on Christ and evangelism.

Arthur DeMoss was successful in business as founder and Chairman of the National Liberty Corporation. His goal was to use his financial acumen to support missions. During his tenure in the 1970s, Art was the voice of Liberty Life Insurance. Mr. DeMoss came to national prominence in 1976 when he put up a $41,000 bond for Eldridge Cleaver, a former Black Panther, who spoke of becoming a Christian.

The couple were patrons of Christian ministries. Mr. DeMoss served on several boards, including Campus Crusade for Christ, Tennessee Temple University, Gordon-Conwell Seminary and The Old-Time Gospel Hour. In 1972 they founded the Church of the Saviour in Wayne, Pennsylvania. His life is memorialized with the Arthur S. DeMoss Foundation.

Nancy Sossomon DeMoss continued their shared vision after her widowhood. She hosted premier dinner parties for non-Christians featuring prominent Christian speakers. These events were conducted in New York City at the DeMoss House and her Palm Beach home. The DeMoss House housed the Executive Ministries team, an evangelistic outreach focusing on professionals, which was part of Campus Crusade for Christ. The DeMoss House ministry paved the way for Tim Keller’s founding of Redeemer Church in 1989. Keller's biographer wrote, “If this crowd would no longer go to church, she would go to them with the message of Jesus.” Her daughter Nancy Wolgemuth wrote, “her model has led me to reverence, honor, and joyously obey the Lord Jesus.”

As a Palm Beach resident, Nancy Sossomon DeMoss owns a property adjacent to Mar-a-Lago. In 2020 a DeMoss family attorney represented neighbors urging Palm Beach officials to prevent outgoing President Trump from living at Mar-a-Lago, stating it went against a 1993 use agreement. Some tabloids erroneously identified a photo of Nancy Leigh DeMoss Wolgemuth as being that of her 82-year-old mother, Nancy S. DeMoss.

Three DeMoss children who have been in the public eye:

- Nancy Leigh DeMoss Wolgemuth, prominent women's ministries leader.
- Mark DeMoss, is retired as the founder of a faith-based public relations firm. He was the spokesman for Billy Graham's family and ministry when Graham died in 2018. His firm also represented his son Franklin Graham's charitable organization Samaritan's Purse. DeMoss was a senior advisor in Mitt Romney's 2008 and 2012 presidential campaigns, and served as chairman of the board of trustees at Liberty University until 2016. The cornerstone for his firm was Isaiah 26:8, “Yes, Lord ... your name and renown are the desire of our hearts.”
- Deborah DeMoss Fonseca served as a vigorous senior aide to conservative U.S. Senator Jesse Helms, championing the Nicaragua Contras rebels. Later, she married a Honduran senior military officer and they advised conservative politicians throughout the El Salvador region. In 1996 the couple campaigned together for his attempted Honduras presidential bid. She has said of her father, "Dad had been a very successful businessman, but it was obvious to all, that that was secondary to the joy and peace he had through his faith in Christ."

== Publications ==
Nancy DeMoss Wolgemuth works, which have been reissued over multiple years, are released through Moody Publishers. In addition to her writings, are study guides and other support materials produced by her Revive Our Hearts staff writers.

- Becoming God's True Woman (2008), formerly titled Biblical Womanhood in the Home (2000)
- A Thirty-Day Walk with God in the Psalms (2001)
- A Place of Quiet Rest: Finding Intimacy with God Through a Daily Devotional Life (2002)
- A Place of Quiet Rest Journal (2002)
- Ruth: The Message of Redemption and Revival in the Book of Ruth (2004), A video Bible study for small groups
- Choosing Forgiveness: Your Journey to Freedom (2006)
- Choosing Gratitude: Your Journey to Joy (2009)
- Seeking Him: Experiencing the Joy of Personal Revival (2009), with Tim Grissom
- Voices of the True Woman Movement: A Call to the Counter-Revolution (2010) Editor: Nancy Leigh DeMoss. Includes John Piper, Mary Kassian, Joni Eareckson-Tada, Karen Loritts, Janet Parshall, and Nancy Leigh DeMoss.
- The Quiet Place: Daily Devotional Readings (2012)
- True Woman 101: Divine Design, An Eight-Week Study on Biblical Womanhood (2012), with Mary A. Kassian
- True Woman 201: Interior Design, Ten Elements of Biblical Womanhood (2015), with Mary A. Kassian
- The Wonder of His Name: 21 Life-Changing Names of Jesus (2014), artwork by Timothy Botts
- Adorned: Living Out the Beauty of the Gospel Together (2017)
- Adorned Study Guide: Living Out the Beauty of the Gospel Together (2018)

Lies Women Believe Series

- Lies Women Believe: And the Truth That Sets Them Free (2001)
- Lies Women Believe: And the Truth That Sets Them Free - updated, expanded edition (2018)
- Lies Women Believe Study Guide (2018)
- Lies Young Women Believe: And the Truth That Sets Them Free (2018), with Dannah Gresh
- Lies Young Women Believe Study Guide (2018), with Dannah Gresh and Erin Davis

Revive Our Hearts Study Series

- Brokenness: The Heart God Revives (2002)
- Surrender: The Heart God Controls (2003)
- Holiness: The Heart God Purifies (2004)

Advent Devotionals

- First Songs of Christmas: Meditations on Luke 1&2: A 31-Day Advent Devotional (2018)
- Consider Jesus: A 31-Day Advent Devotional (2019)
- Born a Child and Yet a King: The Gospel in the Carols: An Advent Devotional (2020)
