= In Touch with Dr. Charles Stanley =

- Also known as: The Chapel Hour
- Genre: Christian
- Presented by: Charles Stanley
- Country of origin: United States
- No. of seasons: 27

Original release
- Network: Syndication; TBN; Daystar
- Release: 1973 – present

In Touch with Dr. Charles Stanley is a television series sponsored by In Touch Ministries in Atlanta, Georgia and hosted by Charles Stanley.

== History ==
The series began airing in 1978. The show has been translated in 50 languages.
