= Unshackled! =

- Genre: Radio drama
- Running time: 30 minutes
- Country of origin: United States
- Languages: English, Spanish, Arabic, Russian, Romanian, Polish, Korean, Persian, Japanese, Albanian, Greek, Macedonian, Turkish and Portuguese
- Announcer: Timothy Gregory
- Directed by: Timothy Gregory
- Recording studio: Chicago, Illinois
- Original release: September 23, 1950
- Website: unshackled.org

Unshackled! is a radio drama series produced by Pacific Garden Mission, in Chicago, Illinois, that first aired on September 23, 1950. It is one of the longest-running radio dramas in history and one of a very few still in production in the United States. The show is aired over 6,500 times around the world each week on over 1,550 radio outlets, and is translated and re-dramatized into eight languages on six continents.

As of January 2022, over 3,707 episodes have been produced, each 30 minutes in length. Unshackled! is produced in the same way as shows during the Golden Age of Radio: Actors record dialogue live before a studio audience, an organist plays live incidental music, and a sound-effects person plays sounds in real time as the show progresses. The show has retained a consistent and distinctive quality throughout its years of production, established by Jack O'Dell's 40-year tenure as its producer/director from 1950 to 1990.

== Characters and stories ==
Each production dramatizes the testimony of someone who converts to Evangelical Christianity, sometimes, the person converts either during or after a visit to Pacific Garden Mission or the person converts after hearing Unshackled! on the radio. Episodes include the life stories of baseball-great-turned-evangelist Billy Sunday, himself a Pacific Garden Mission convert, and Dominic Mance, an international banker who became a homeless vagabond nearly overnight. Past members of the cast and crew range from current actors to Golden Age of Radio personalities such as Harry Elders, Bob O'Donnell, Jack Bivans, Stan Dale and Russ Reed.

With rare exceptions, the scripts are derived from actual testimonies and actual events. Beginning in the 1950s, comic book versions of many Unshackled! stories were also produced.

== See also ==
- Adventures in Odyssey (1987–present), another long-running Christian radio drama.
