= Ranger Bill =

- Running time: 15 minutes (1950-1954), 30 Minutes (1954-1964)
- Country of origin: United States
- Home station: WMBI-FM
- Starring: Miron Canaday
- Written by: Charles Erkhart, John Rowan
- Directed by: Charles Christensen, Jim Grant
- Produced by: Moody Radio
- Recording studio: Studio B
- Original release: 1950 – 1964
- No. of episodes: 214

Ranger Bill is a Christian radio program from the 1950s, produced by Moody Radio. With over 200 episodes produced, Ranger Bill stars Miron Canaday as the title character and Stumpy Jenkins—with Ed Ronne, Sr as Grey Wolf. The main character, Ranger Bill, is a forest ranger located in the town of Knotty Pine along the Rocky Mountains. The show describes the various tales of the adventures of Ranger Bill and his friends.

== Radio program ==
The Moody Bible Institute originally aired on October 2, 1950 in 15-minute episodes. The series later aired in half-hour episode format, with the earliest known episode airing May 14, 1954. The series continued through 1964, and was later syndicated through to the present in 30-minute episodes.

=== Crew ===
- Charles Christensen - director
- Jim Grant - director
- Joal Hanson - writer
- John Rowan - writer
- John McCombe - sound effects

=== Actors ===
- Miron Canaday as Ranger Bill, Stumpy Jenkins
- Ed Ronne Sr. as Gray Wolf
- Roger Compton as Henry Scott

== Character universe ==
=== Main characters ===
- Bill Jefferson is the chief forest ranger. He lives with his mother in the small town of Knotty Pine. He's described as a well-built leader capable of accomplishing nearly anything.
- Stumpy Jenkins, another forest ranger, is often referred to as "The Old Timer". Known for his superb marksmanship, he likes to tell jokes and travel around with his rifle. A good description of his rifle is given in the episode "The Prehistoric Monster".
- Henry Scott is the teenage ward of Ranger Bill, who helps out in many park ranger tasks.
- Gray Wolf is a Native American of the Dakota tribe, and also a forest ranger. Although he talks in broken English, he is knowledgeable in both modern forest management and the traditional ways of his people. Drawing on both, he makes a valuable contribution to the rangers.

=== Minor characters ===
- Ralph, a forest ranger.
- Sheriff Cal, the county sheriff
- Jo Jo, a friend of Henry's
- Pat O'Roark, Knotty Pine's chief of police.
- Frenchy DeSalle, chief lumberjack in the area.
- Colonel Anders, Ranger Bill's boss.
- Moose McBain, a local fur trapper.
- Maggie Murphy, Stumpy's housekeeper in "The Battle At Jenkins Manor" and cook at summer camp in "Mrs. Murphy's Chowder" and also {cook} aboard the "River Giant."
- George Benton, Replaces Col. Anders temporarily in "The Hard Head."
- Jane Reeves, Fire watcher in "Petticoat Rangers."
- Jock McIntosh, Knotty Pine's blacksmith in "The Wrong Valley."
- Annie McIntosh, Jock's wife. Also appears in "The Wrong Valley."
- Dutch Vanderhaven, Knotty Pine's own version of "The Self-Made Man."
- Mary Lu, a friend of Henry's in "Mystery Island" and "The Measure of a Man."
- Alec, a friend of Henry's in "Water tower Rescue" "He broke through the Ice" and "The bomb shelter

== Location Universe ==
- Knotty Pine, the central focus of the Ranger Bill series.
- Junction City, a town about an hour from Knotty Pine and comparable in size.
- Border Town, a town of questionable character located just outside the park rangers' jurisdiction.
- Central City, the nearest major city to Knotty Pine.

== Listen Online ==
https://archive.org/details/OTRR_Ranger_Bill_Singles

== List of episodes ==
No.	Title	Original release date	Opening
RB001	"20 Fathoms Under the Sea"	May 26, 1954	1
Bill and the boys go deep sea fishing with old salvage man Ben Benson. An old Navy sub used for training is stuck on the bottom and Ben can but won't help because his son died on a salvage job.
RB002	"A Boy and A Bomb"	unknown	1
Bill gets secret orders to escort Hal Dever to the Army proving grounds to test a bomb timing device. Hal is a single father who ignores his son Jim. The boy takes the timer and starts it ticking.
RB003	"Getting with the Wrong Crowd"	March 28, 1956	1
George Bruce returns to Knotty Pine after spending time in reform school. Townsfolks refuse to accept him or help him. Bill gets him a delivery job with Frenchy DeSalle's logging operation where he loses the payroll.
RB004	"The Hermit"	December 21, 1955	1
A hermit who moves into a cabin in Bill's territory turns out to be a desperately needed brain surgeon.
RB005	"Burning Sands"	May 16, 1954	1
Elderly desert prospector Joshua Webb is told by his doctor to stay in Knotty Pine for his health, but the lure of gold takes him back to the desert anyway. Bill and the boys must brave 120-degree heat to rescue Joshua.
RB006	"The Fire Bug"	August 11, 1954	1
Randolph Thompson's coal fired railroad engines threaten the big pines in the forests along his rail lines.
RB007	"Miracles"	December 20, 1961	2
Henry and Freddy go on a hike where Freddy has to wrestle with his faith and miracles. The boys need a miracle when Freddy falls into Half-Mile Gulley and breaks his leg, while flood waters from a broken dam threaten to drown the boys. Only a miracle can save them.
RB008	"They Called It (Him) the Jinx"	November 5, 1955	1
Tom Farris called in to be foreman of bridge project over 1,200-foot-deep Dead Man's Gorge. The crew is afraid of the jinx on Tom from accidents caused by pushing his men.
RB009	"Bim the Dog"	March 9, 1955	1
A brave dog protects his family then serves his country.
RB010	"Hit and Run"	April 13, 1955	1
Two boys hide after hitting an elderly pedestrian.
