= Joni Eareckson Tada =

American artist and author (born 1949)

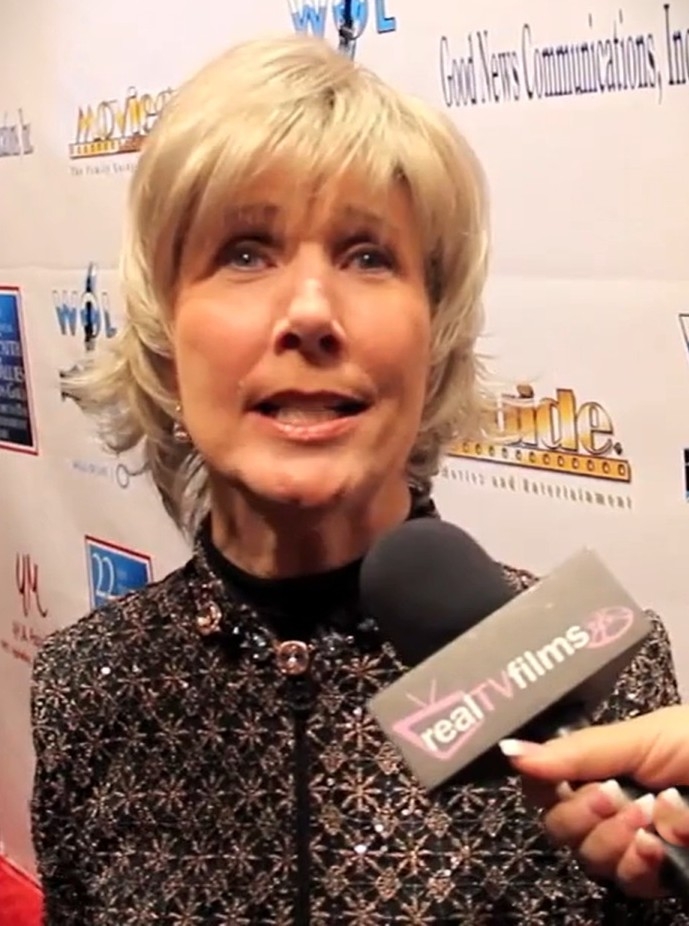
- Tada in 2014
- Born: October 15, 1949 (age 77); Baltimore, Maryland, U.S.
- Occupations: Author; artist; singer; radio personality; disability rights advocate
- Spouse: Ken Tada (m. 1982)
- Writing career
- Genre: Christian literature
- Subject: Non-fiction
- Website: www.joniandfriends.org

Joni Eareckson Tada (born October 15, 1949) is an American evangelical Christian author, radio host, artist, and founder of Joni PTL, Joni and Friends, an organization "accelerating Christian ministry in the disability community".

== Early life ==
Joni Eareckson was born on October 15, 1949, in Baltimore, Maryland, the youngest of four daughters, to John and Lindy Eareckson. She was named after her father, so Joni pronounces her name as "Johnny". John participated in the 1932 Summer Olympics as an alternate for the United States wrestling team and was honored as a Distinguished Member of the National Wrestling Hall of Fame and Museum in 1996. Joni was a member of Bishop Cummins Reformed Episcopal Church, where she was confirmed as a young woman.

With the example of her parents, Joni lived a very active life all throughout growing up. She enjoyed riding horses, hiking, tennis, and swimming. On July 30, 1967, at age 17, Joni dove into the Chesapeake Bay after misjudging the shallowness of the water. She had a fracture between the fourth and fifth cervical vertebrae and became a quadriplegic (or tetraplegic), paralyzed from the shoulders down. During her two years of rehabilitation, according to her autobiography Joni, Joni experienced anger, depression, suicidal thoughts, and religious doubts. However, during occupational therapy, she learned to paint with a brush between her teeth and began selling her artwork. She also writes this way, although for most writing tasks she relies on voice recognition software. To date, she has written over 40 books, recorded several musical albums, and starred in an autobiographical movie of her life, and is an advocate for people with disabilities.

Joni wrote of her experiences in her 1976 international best-selling autobiography, Joni: The unforgettable story of a young woman's struggle against quadriplegia & depression, which has been distributed in many languages. The book was made into a 1980 feature film of the same name, starring herself. Her second book, A Step Further, was released in 1978.

== Ministry and public life ==
Tada founded Joni and Friends in 1979, an organization to "accelerate Christian ministry in the disability community" throughout the world. In 2007 the Joni and Friends International Disability Center in Agoura Hills, California, was established. Led by Tada (founder and CEO) and John Nugent (president and COO), the Joni and Friends International Disability Center runs a multi-faceted non-profit covering a number of program outlets. The longest-running program is "Joni and Friends Radio", a five-minute radio program begun in 1982. It now runs four minutes in length and can be heard each weekday on over 1,000 broadcast outlets. Tada also records a one-minute radio feature, "Diamonds in the Dust", that airs daily. Both programs have received awards: "Joni and Friends Radio" received the "Radio Program of the Year" award from National Religious Broadcasters in 2002, and "Diamonds in the Dust" won the same award in 2011 in the short program.

Other Joni and Friends programs include Family Retreats (a camp/retreat experience for families affected by disability), Wounded Warrior Getaways (which offer a similar experience for families of Wounded Warriors), and Wheels for the World (which collects manual wheelchairs and other mobility devices to be refurbished by volunteers in prison restoration shops, then shipped overseas, where the wheelchairs are fitted by physical therapists to people in developing nations). Joni and Friends also has produced 51 episodes of Joni and Friends TV, and overseen the formation of the Christian Institute on Disability (a training and advocacy arm of Joni and Friends), among other ventures. While the main office of Joni and Friends remains in Agoura Hills, California, smaller offices can be found across the United States.

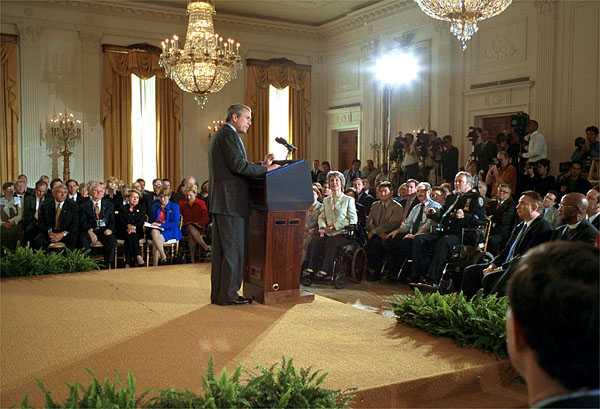
President George W. Bush calls on the Senate to support a ban on human cloning during an address on April 10, 2002. Pictured at center to the right of the lectern is disability advocate Joni Eareckson Tada.

In 2005, Tada was appointed to the Disability Advisory Committee of the U.S. State Department. Tada served on the National Council on Disability under presidents Reagan and Bush in 1988. The first draft of the Americans with Disabilities Act was authored by this council.

Tada is a conference speaker. Her articles have been published in Christianity Today, Today's Christian Woman, The War Cry (Salvation Army), and newspapers around the world. Tada has appeared several times on Larry King Live. In 1989, Tada was a plenary speaker at the Second International Congress on World Evangelization in Manila. She served until 2013 in her appointment as the Lausanne Senior Associate for Disability Concerns. As of 2017, Tada is still a board member of the Lausanne Movement.

As of 2017, Tada is an adviser on many organizations, such as the Board of Reference for the Christian Medical and Dental Society, Young Life Capernaum Board, CBM International, National Institute for Learning Disabilities, and the American Leprosy Missions, now operating as Hope Rises International. She also served on Love and Action, the Institute on Learning Disabilities, the Disability Advisory Committee, New Europe Communications, and the Christian Writers Guild, and as honorary co-chair of the Presidential Prayer Team. She also served on Love and Action, the Institute on Learning Disabilities, the Disability Advisory Committee, New Europe Communications, and the Christian Writers Guild, and as honorary co-chair of the Presidential Prayer Team. She has been interviewed by the Chicago Tribune, Ligonier Ministries, and the Los Angeles Times.

In November 2009, Tada signed an ecumenical statement known as the Manhattan Declaration calling on evangelicals, Catholic and Eastern Orthodox Christians to work towards changing laws which permit abortion, and other matters that go against their religious consciences.

== Music ==
Tada received media attention in 2014 for her performance of the title song from the Christian film Alone yet Not Alone. With limited lung capacity due to her disability, Tada had her husband, Ken, pushing on her diaphragm while she recorded the song to give her enough breath to hit the high notes. Tada has no professional training in music. While the song's writers initially received a nomination for an Oscar in the Original Song category, the nomination was later revoked for what the academy deemed improper campaigning by the composer, Bruce Broughton. Some controversy followed this decision, and subsequent media attention helped the song's official YouTube video, featuring Tada, surpass one million views.

== Books ==
Tada is the author of over 48 books on the subjects of disability and Christianity. Several of them have been children's books, including Tell Me The Promises, which received the Evangelical Christian Publishers' Association's (ECPA) Gold Medallion and the silver medal in the 1997 C. S. Lewis Awards, and Tell Me The Truth, which received the ECPA Gold Medallion in 1998. The life story of Tada was used by Czech composer Ivan Kurz in his opera Večerní shromáždění ketho (Evening Divine service).

== Personal life ==
Joni married Ken Tada in 1982. For many years, Ken was a high school history teacher and coach, though he is now retired. Ken is sansei, meaning that he is the third generation to be born in the United States after his family immigrated from Japan. Ken and Joni live in Calabasas, California. They have no children.

In 2010, Tada announced that she had been diagnosed with Stage III breast cancer. She underwent a mastectomy and chemotherapy. Tada's treatment proved successful, and she was declared cancer-free in 2015. In November 2018, Tada was diagnosed with a malignant nodule on her chest wall near the site of her original cancer. Radiation treatments for the nodule proved successful, and, in July 2019, Tada announced that she had once again been declared cancer-free.

== Awards ==
- 1979 American Academy of Achievement's Golden Plate Award for Inspiring Victory Over Quadriplegia
- Courage Award from the Courage Rehabilitation Center
- Award of Excellence from the Patricia Neal Rehabilitation Center
- Golden Word Award from the International Bible Society
- 1985 First woman to be honored by the National Association of Evangelicals as their "Layperson of the Year"
- 1989 Victory Award from the National Rehabilitation Hospital
- 1993 "Churchwoman of the Year" by the Religious Heritage Foundation
- 1997 Silver Medal, C. S. Lewis Award from the Christian Educators Association
- 2001 Inducted into the Christian Booksellers Association's Hall of Honor
- 2002 William Ward Ayer Award for excellence from the National Religious Broadcasters
- 2003 ECPA Gold Medallion Award in Christian Education for her book When God Weeps
- 2003 ECPA Gold Medallion Lifetime Achievement Award by the Evangelical Christian Publishers Association
- 2004 ECPA Gold Medallion Award in Elementary Children for co-authoring Hymns for a Kid's Heart, Volume 1
- 2009 Inducted into the Indiana Wesleyan University Society of World Changers in 2009
- 2009 Inducted into the Indiana Wesleyan University Society of World Changers and presented with an honorary doctorate while speaking at the university on April 1, 2009
- 2009 Honored by Women in Christian Media with the Excellence in Communication award of merit for National Achievement in Christian Media
- 2011 Named the 2011 Honorary Chairman of the National Day of Prayer
- 2015 Robert Neff Award from the Moody Bible Institute
- 2012 William Wilberforce Award from the Colson Center for Christian Worldview
- 2012 Inducted by the National Religious Broadcasters into the NRB Hall of Fame* 2017 Named Daniel of the Year by WORLD News Group
- 2017 Charles W. Colson Courage & Conviction Award from Biola University

=== Degrees ===
Tada also holds the following honorary degrees:

- Bachelor of Letters from Western Maryland College
- Humanities from Gordon College
- Doctor of Humane Letters from Columbia International University, the first honorary doctorate bestowed in its 75-year history
- Doctor of Divinity from Westminster Theological Seminary
- Doctor of Divinity from Lancaster Bible College
- Doctor of Humane Letters from Indiana Wesleyan University
- Doctor of Laws from Biola University
- Doctor of Humanitarian Services from California Baptist University

=== Bibliography ===
- Joni (1976) with Joe Musser (published as Joni: An Unforgettable Story) and updated in 2001, 2012 and 2021 (45th anniversary)
- A Step Further: Growing closer to God through hurt and hardship (1978) with Steve Estes
- The Great Alphabet Fight: and How Peace Was Made (1983) with Steve Jensen
- Choices...Changes 1986
- All God's Children: Ministry to the Disabled (1987) with Gene Newman
- Friendship Unlimited: How You Can Help a Disabled Friend (1987) with Bev Singleton
- Jeremy, Barnabas, and the Wonderful Dream (1987)
- Meet My Friends (1987)
- Darcy (1988)
- Ryan and the Circus Wheels (1988) with Norman McGary
- Secret Strength: For Those Who Search (1988)
- Glorious Intruder: God's Presence in Life's Chaos (1989)
- Let God Be God (1989)
- A Christmas Longing (1990)
- Pursued (1990)
- Seeking God (Reflections): My Journey of Prayer and Praise (1991)
- A Step Further: Growing Closer to God Through Hurt & Friendship (1991)
- Joni's Story (1992)
- All God's Children: Guide to Enabling the Disabled (1992)
- When Is It Right to Die?: Suicide, Euthanasia, Suffering, Mercy (1992) with C. Everett Koop
- Darcy and the Meanest Teacher in the World (1993) with Steve Jensen
- All God's Children: Ministry with Disabled Persons (1993) Gene Newman, Joni Eareckson Tada
- Diamonds in the Dust: 366 Sparkling Devotions (1993)
- Just Like Everybody Else (1993) Jim Pierson, Joni Eareckson Tada
- The Healing Promise: Is It Always God's Will to Heal? Will He Heal Me? (1994) Richard L. Mayhue, Joni Eareckson Tada
- Flights of Angels (1994) with others
- Darcy's Dog Dilemma (1994) with Steve Jensen
- Darcy's Great Expectations (1994) with Steve Jensen and LoraBeth Norton
- A Quiet Place in a Crazy World (1994)
- Heaven: Your Real Home...From a Higher Perspective (1995)
- How to Create an Effective Disability Outreach in Your Church (1995) Steve Miller, Joni Eareckson Tada
- The Life and Death Dilemma: Families Facing Health Care Choices (1995)
- A Christmas Longing (1996)
- Honestly (1996) Sheila Walsh, Joni Eareckson Tada
- Tell Me the Promises: A Family Covenant for Eternity (1996)
- When God Weeps: Why Our Sufferings Matter to the Almighty (1997)
- Tell Me the Truth: God's Eternal Truth for Families (1997) with Steve Jensen
- Barrier-free Friendships: Bridging the Distance Between You and Friends with Disabilities (1997)
- God's Precious Love (1998)
- More Precious Than Silver: 366 Daily Devotional Readings (1998)
- I'll Be With You Always (1998)
- Holiness in Hidden Places (1999)
- Prayers from a Child's Heart (1999)
- Heaven: What Will It Be Like (1999)
- Acres of Hope: The Miraculous Story of One Family's Gift of Love to Children Without Hope (1999)
- You've Got a Friend (1999)
- The Amazing Secret (Darcy and Friends, #1) (2000)
- O Worship The King (2000)
- Forever Friends (2000) with Melody Carlson
- The Unforgettable Summer (Darcy and Friends, #2) (2000) with Steve Jensen
- Choices Changes (2000)
- Ordinary People, Extraordinary Faith (2001)
- NIV Encouragement Bible (2001)
- The Incredible Discovery of Lindsey Renee (2001)
- O Come, All Ye Faithful: Hymns of Adoration and Joy to Celebrate His Birth (2001) with Robert Wolgemuth, Bobbie Wolgemuth, John MacArthur
- The Mission Adventure (2001)
- Ordinary People, Extraordinary Faith (2001)
- God's Tender Care (2002)
- On the Wings of the West Wind (2002)
- What Wondrous Love Is This: Hymns of Wonder and Worship to Remember His Love (2002) with Bobbie Wolgemuth (with CD)
- When Morning Gilds the Skies: Hymns of Heaven and Our Eternal Hope (2002) with Bobbie Wolgemuth (with CD)
- The Hand That Paints The Sky: Delighting in the Creator's Canvas (2003)
- The God I Love: A Lifetime of Walking with Jesus (2003)
- Special Needs, Special Ministry (2003) (foreword)
- Hymns for a Kid's Heart Vol. 1 (2003) with Bobbie Wolgemuth
- Hymns for a Kid's Heart Vol. 2 (2004) with Bobbie Wolgemuth
- Christmas Carols for a Kid's Heart (Hymns for a Kid's Heart Vol. 3) (2004) with Bobbie Wolgemuth
- Passion Hymns for a Kid's Heart (Hymns for a Kid's Heart Vol. 4) (2004) with Bobbie Wolgemuth
- 31 Days Toward Intimacy with God (2005)
- Living Without Limits: 10 Keys to Unlocking the Champion in You (2005) Judy Siegle, Joni Eareckson Tada
- Why (2005) Anne Graham Lotz, Joni Eareckson Tada
- A Father's Touch (2005)
- 365 Days of Hope: Encouragement for Those Facing Loss, Pain, and Disappointment (2006) with Dave Dravecky, Jan Dravecky
- Pearls of Great Price (2006)
- How To Be A Christian in a Brave New World (2006)
- 31 Days toward Overcoming Adversity (2006)
- 31 Days Toward Passionate Faith (2007)
- Hope...the Best of Things (2008)
- A Thankful Heart in a World of Hurt (2008)
- A Lifetime of Wisdom: Embracing the Way God Heals You (2009)
- Life in the Balance: Biblical Answers for the Issues of Our Day (2009)
- Finding God in Hidden Places (2010)
- A Place of Healing: Wrestling with the Mysteries of Suffering, Pain, and God's Sovereignty (2010)
- Life in the Balance: Leader's Guide: Raise Awareness & Move People to Action (2010)
- Silver & Gold Devotional (2010)
- When is it Right to Die? (2012)
- Diagnosed with Breast Cancer: Life After Shock (2012)
- Gaining a Hopeful Spirit (2012)
- Anger: Aim it in the Right Direction (2012)
- God's Sovereignty: God's Hand in Our Hardship (2012)
- God's Hand in Our Hardship (2012)
- Breaking the Bonds of Fear (2013)
- Living a Life That Pleases God (2013)
- No Longer Alone (2013)
- When God Seems Unjust (2013)
- Stressed to the Max: Peace for Women Under Pressure (2013)
- Joni & Ken: An Untold Love Story (2013)
- Pain and Providence (2013)
- Beyond Suffering Reader: A Christian View on Disability on Disability Ministry: A Cultural Adaptation (2014) with Steve Bundy, Pat Verbal
- Speaking God's Language (2014)
- Beside Bethesda: 31 Days Toward Deeper Healing (2014)
- ‘’Beyond Suffering Bible’’NLT (New Living Translation) Tyndale Publishing (2016)
- A Spectacle of Glory: God's Light Shining Through Me Every Day (2016)
- Grief (2016)
- When God Breaks Your Heart: Choosing Hope in the Midst of Faith-Shattering Circumstances (2017) Ed Underwood, Joni Eareckson Tada
- When Is It Right to Die?: A Comforting and Surprising Look at Death and Dying (2018)
- Infinite Hope: In the Midst of Struggles (2018) Joni and Friends, Joni Eareckson Tada (forward)
- Songs of Suffering: 25 Hymns and Devotions for Weary Souls (2022)
- The Practice of the Presence of Jesus: Daily Meditations on the Nearness of Our Savior (2023) with John Sloan
- Keeping Faith When Life Hurts: 100 Devotions for Hard Days (2026)

=== Discography ===
- Journey's End (1979)
- Joni's Song (1981)
- Spirit Wings (1982)
- Lord of Love (1984)
- I've Got Wheels! (1985) with Joni's Kids
- Let God Be God (1989)
- When Is It Right to Die? Suicide, Euthanasia, Suffering, Mercy (1992)
- Harps & Halos: Songs About Heaven (1994)
- Joni: An Unforgettable Story (2001) audio book
- The Great Adventure: A Very Special Story for Children (2001) Narrator
- God's Precious Love (2002)
- God's Tender Care (2002)
- When Morning Gilds the Skies: Great Hymns of Our Faith (2002)
- Choose Life!, Focus on the Family (2004)
- Alone yet Not Alone (2013)

== Filmography ==
- Joni (1980)
- Reflections of His Love (1981)
- The Journey (1992)
- Heaven: Our Eternal Home (2001)
- Joni and Friends (2007–2009) TV series
- The Terri Schiavo Story (2009)
- When Robin Prays (2009)
