= Dean Francis Alfar =

Filipino writer (born 1969)

Dean Francis Alfar (born 2 January 1969), is a Filipino playwright, novelist and writer of speculative fiction. His plays have been performed in venues across the country, while his articles and fiction have been published both in his native Philippines and abroad, such as in Strange Horizons, Rabid Transit, The Year's Best Fantasy and Horror and the Exotic Gothic series.

He is the author of the novel Salamanca (Ateneo Press, 2006), as well as three collections of short fiction - The Kite of Stars and other stories (Anvil Publishing, 2007), How to Traverse Terra Incognita (Visprint, 2014), and A Field Guide to the Roads of Manila (Anvil Publishing, 2015).

His literary awards include ten Don Carlos Palanca Memorial Awards for Literature (Palanca Awards) — including the Grand Prize for Novel — as well as the Manila Critics' Circle National Book Awards for the graphic novels Siglo: Freedom and Siglo: Passion, and the Philippines Free Press Literary Award.

He was a fellow at the 1992 Dumaguete National Writers Workshop as well as the 20th and 48th UP National Writers Workshop.

He is the Chair of the Manila Critics Circle.

He is an advocate of the literature of the fantastic, editing the Philippine Speculative Fiction series, as well as a comic book creator.

Alfar is also an entrepreneur — running several businesses. He lives in Manila with his wife, fictionist Nikki Alfar and their two daughters.

== Awards ==
Philippine Graphic Fiction Awards

- 2010 - Prose (Remembrance)

Gintong Aklat Awards

- 2008 - Literature (Salamanca)

Don Carlos Palanca Memorial Awards for Literature

- 2007 - for short story for Children (Poor, Poor Luisa)
- 2006 - for short story for Children (How Rosang Taba Won the Race)
- 2005 - for the novel (Salamanca)
- 2004 - for futuristic fiction (Hollow Girl)
- 2004 - for one-act play (The Kite of Stars)
- 2003 - for one-act play (The Onan Circle)
- 1994 - for full-length play (Island)
- 1994 - for one-act play (Loving Toto)
- 1991 - for one-act play (Short Time)
- 1990 - for one-act play (Fragments of Memory)

Manila Critics' Circle National Book Awards

- 2006- Best Comic Book (Siglo: Passion)
- 2004- Best Comic Book (Siglo: Freedom)

Philippines Free Press Literary Awards

- 2007 - for short story (Six from Downtown)

Fellowships

- 31st National Writers' Workshop, Dumaguete (1992) - Writing Fellow
- 20th U.P. National Writers' Workshop (1992) - Writing Fellow
- 48th U.P. National Writers' Workshop (2009) - Writing Fellow

== Works ==
=== Books ===
- Salamanca, Ateneo de Manila University Press, April 2006. Grand Prize Winner for Novel, Don Carlos Palanca Memorial Awards for Literature, 2005.
- The Kite of Stars and Other Stories, Anvil Publishing, 2007. (Collection of short fiction)
- How to Traverse Terra Incognita, Visprint, 2014. (Collection of short fiction)
- A Field Guide to the Roads of Manila, Anvil Publishing, 2015. (Collection of short fiction)
- How Rosang Taba Won A Race, Lampara Books, 2012. (Children's Book)
- Philippine Speculative Fiction Vol. 1, Kestrel, December 2005. (Anthology of short fiction)
- Philippine Speculative Fiction Vol. 2, Kestrel, December 2006. (Anthology of short fiction)
- Philippine Speculative Fiction Vol. 3, Kestrel, December 2007. (with Nikki Alfar, Anthology of short fiction)
- Philippine Speculative Fiction Vol. 4, Kestrel, February, 2009. (with Nikki Alfar, Anthology of short fiction)
- Philippine Speculative Fiction Vol. 8, Flipside Books, July 2013. (with Nikki Alfar, Anthology of short fiction)
- The Best of Philippine Speculative Fiction 2005 - 2010, UP Press, February 2013. (with Nikki Alfar, Anthology of short fiction); ebook, Flipside, July 2013
- The Farthest Shore: An Anthology of Fantasy Fiction from the Philippines, UP Press, August 2013. (with Joseph Nacino, Anthology of short fiction)
- VOLUME One, Anvil, 2013. (with Sarge Lacuesta, Anthology of short fiction, forthcoming)
- Horror: Filipino Fiction for Young Adults, UP Press, 2013. (with Kenneth Yu, Anthology of short fiction, forthcoming)

=== Short fiction ===
- “Terminos” forthcoming in The Time Traveller's Almanac, edited by Ann & Jeff Vandermeer, Tor/Head of Zeus
- “Enkantong-bato” forthcoming in Bestiary, edited by Ann & Jeff Vandermeer
- “Jianghu” forthcoming in Lakeside Circus
- “Glove & Goggles” in Philippines Graphic, July 2013
- “Things” in Querida: An Anthology, edited by Caroline Hau, Katrina Tuvera and Isabelita O. Reyes, June 2013
- “Remembrance” in Manila Envelope 4, edited by Jessica Zafra, April 2013
- “The Kite of Stars (L'Aquilone du Estrellas)” in Hoard of Thunder: Philippine Short Stories in English Volume II 2001 to 2008, edited by Gemino H Abad, U.P. Press, January 2013
- “Notes on an Ascent” in Thursday Never Looking Back, edited by Adam David, Youth & Beauty Brigade, December 2012
- “Ohkti” in Philippines Graphic, November 2012
- “A Field Guide to the Streets of Manila” in Esquire Philippines, November 2012
- “The New Daughter” in Philippine Genre Stories, October 2012
- “Simon's Replica” in Apex Magazine 41, October 2012
- “Terminos ” in Expanded Horizons, September 2012
- “Azamgal” in How to Traverse Terra Incognita, Flipside, August 2012
- “Securing Doors from Fathers” in How to Traverse Terra Incognita, Flipside, August 2012
- “East of the Sun” in Philippine Speculative Fiction Vol. 7, edited by Alexander Osias and Kate Osias
- “Brother & Sister” in Philippines Free Press, April 2012
- “The Girl with the Gun” in Philippines Graphic, March 26, 2012
- “The Malaya” in Diaspora Ad Astra, edited by Joseph Nacino & Emil Flores, Estranghero Press, January 2012
- "A Door Opens: The Beginning of the Fall of the Ispancialo-in-Hinirang (Emprensa Press: 2007)” by Salahuddin Alonto, Annotated by Omar Jamad Maududi, MLS, HOL, JMS" in Alternative Alamat, edited by Paolo Chikiamco, Rocket Kapre Books, 2011
- “The Face” in Philippines Free Press, December 2011
- “Escape” in Philippines Genre Stories, October 2011
- “The Fortune-teller's Beautiful Daughter” in Philippines Graphic, July 2011
- “Packing for the Moon” in Philippines Free Press, June 2011
- “Simon's Replica” in Philippines Free Press, May 2010
- “Bruhita” in Exotic Gothic III, edited by Danel Olson, Ash-Tree Press, 2009
- “Ghosts of Wan Chai” in Connecting Flights: Nineteen Filipinos Report From Elsewhere, edited by Ruel de Vera, Anvil, December 2009
- “In the Dim Plane” in Bewildering Stories, issue 366, January 2010
- “The Kite of Stars ” in The Apex Book of World SF, edited by Lavie Tidhar, Apex 2009
- “Something Like That” in Growing Up Filipino II, edited by Cecilia Manguerra Brainard, December 2009
- “How My Mother Flew” in Growing Up Filipino II, edited by Cecilia Manguerra Brainard, December 2009
- “The Music Teacher” in Growing Up Filipino II, edited by Cecilia Manguerra Brainard, December 2009
- “Strange Weather” in The Farthest Shore, edited by Joseph Nacino & Dean Francis Alfar, 2009; and in Philippine Speculative Fiction 5. edited by Nikki Alfar and Vincent Michael Simbulan (Kestrel, 2010)
- “Messiah” in Dark Blue Southern Seas 2009, edited by F. Jordan Carnice, April 2009
- “Fallow's Flight” in A Time for Dragons, edited by Vincent Michael Simbulan, Anvil Fantasy, March 2009
- “Report HC-IK017785A-0097B-006 de Ocampo: Survey of Artifacts Found in the Derelict Vessel The Malaya” in Philippines Free Press, November 2008.
- “I, D.I." in Belonging: Stories of Relationships, edited by Erlinda Panlilio, Anvil, October 2008
- “Remembrance” in Exotic Gothic II, edited by Danel Olson, Ash-Tree Press, September 2008
- “The Maiden and the Crocodile” reprint in Bewildering Stories, September 2008.
- “The Many Loves of Ramil Alonzo” in Philippines Free Press, August 2008.
- “Sunboy” in Philippines Free Press, May 2008.
- “In the Dim Plane” in Digest of Philippine Genre Stories, April 2008.
- “The Middle Prince” in Tales of Fantasy and Enchantment, edited by Cristina Pantoja-Hidalgo, February 2008
- “An Excerpt from 'Princes of the Sultanate' (Ghazali: 1902); Annotated by Omar Jamad Maududi, MLS, HOL, JMS” in Story Philippines, February 2008
- “Chasing Aurora" in Sunday Inquirer Magazine of the Philippine Daily Inquirer, November 2007.
- “Ever, After” in Philippines Free Press, August 2007.
- “Into the Morning” in Bewildering Stories, July 2007.
- “The Dragon in the Bell” in Philippines Free Press, June 2007.
- “Sabados con Fray Villalobos” in A la Carte; Food and Fiction, edited by Cecilia Manguerra Brainard and Marily Orosa (February 2007).
- “The Middle Prince” in Bewildering Stories, September 2006; Digest of Philippine Genre Stories, December 2006
- “How Rosang Taba Won A Race” in Philippines Free Press, July 2006.
- “Six From Downtown” in Philippines Free Press, June 2006; Philippine Speculative Fiction Vol.2 (Kestrel, December 2006)
- “The Maiden and the Crocodile” in Story Philippines, March 2006.
- “Hollow Girl: A Romance” in Latitude: Writing from the Philippines and Scotland, edited by Angelo Rodriguez Lacuesta and Toni Davidson (Anvil Publishing, March 2006; Futuristic Fiction, Don Carlos Palanca Memorial Awards for Literature, 2004).
- “Four-letter Words” in Manual, January 2006.
- “Terminos” in Rabid Transit : Menagerie, (Velocity Press, U.S.A., May 2005).
- “L'Aquilone du Estrellas (The Kite of Stars) ” in Strange Horizons, January 2003; in The Year's Best Fantasy & Horror Seventeenth Annual Collection, edited by Ellen Datlow, Kelly Link & Gavin Grant (St. Martin's Press, U.S.A., August 2004); and in Philippine Speculative Fiction Vol. 1, edited by Dean Francis Alfar (Kestrel, December 2005).
- “Gumamela” in ab ovo 2 (Kestrel Studios, January 2003).
- “Ser Clessidrana Acerca Tiempo (Mr. Clessidrana Thinks About Time)” in Hinirang.com, 2002.
- “(push)” in Stuff Magazine, May 2001.
- “Spark: The Sad and Strange Tale of Sister Maria Dolores, the Nun who Exploded” in National Midweek, 1992.
- “The Last Mermaid Story” in National Midweek, 1992.
- “The Secret Measure” in National Midweek, 1992.
- “Magan & Balo” in Mr. & Ms. Magazine, 1991.

=== Comic Books ===
- Siglo: Passion, edited by Dean Francis Alfar & Vincent Michael Simbulan (Kestrel/Nautilus Books, 2005).
- The Craft Century in Project: Hero, edited by Elbert Or & Andrew Drilon (Questventures, 2005).
- Invitation in K.I.A., edited by Marco Dimaano (Alamat Comics, 2005).
- Quad in Hey Comics!, edited by Ramon de Veyra, 2004.
- Siglo: Freedom, edited by Dean Francis Alfar & Vincent Michael Simbulan (Kestrel/Nautilus Books, 2003).
- Ab Ovo 1, 2, edited by Dean Francis Alfar (Kestrel, 2002).
- The Lost 1, 2. Kestrel, 2001.

== See also ==
- TJ Dimacali
