= Jessica Zafra =

Filipino writer

- Born: 1965 (age 59–60); Philippines
- Occupation: Writer, columnist, editor, publisher, television host, radio host

Website
- jessicarulestheuniverse.com

Jessica Zafra (Tagalog: [ˌdʒɛsiˈka ˈsapɾa]; born 1965) is a fiction writer, columnist, editor, publisher, and former television and radio show host. She is known for her sharp and witty writing style. Her work often are about current events (both Philippine and international), tennis, movies, music, cats, books, technology, and her personal life. Her work has been the subject of academic study. The main ingredient to her work is often fun cynicism and irony.

== Biography ==
Zafra attended Saint Theresa's College of Quezon City, Quezon City, from prep school until the 6th Grade, after which she went to the main campus of the Philippine Science High School and then to the University of the Philippines where she majored in comparative literature.

Her most popular books are the Twisted series, a collection of her essays as a columnist for the newspaper Today (now Manila Standard Today), as well as from her time as editor and publisher of the magazine Flip. She currently writes a weekly column for InterAksyon.com, the online news portal of TV5. She resides in Metro Manila, Philippines, where she is working on her first novel. She also managed the Eraserheads during the 1990s.

== Selected publications ==
=== Books ===
- 500 People You Meet in Hell
- Manananggal Terrorizes Manila and Other Short Stories, 1992
- Womenagerie and Other Tales from the Front, 1995
- Twisted, 1995
- Twisted II: Spawn of Twisted, 1996
- Fruitcake, 1997 (as editor)
- Planet of the Twisted, 1998
- Chicken Pox for the Soul, 1999
- Twisted IV
- Twisted V
- Twisted 6
- Tw7sted
- Twisted 8: Night of the Living Twisted
- Twisted Flicks, 2007
- Twisted Travels
- Twisted 8½
- Twisted 9
- The word-eaters
- Geeks vs. Jocks, 2014
- The Stories So Far, 2015
- The Collected Stories of Jessica Zafra, 2019
- The Age of Umbrage, 2020
- ' ' Portents

=== Magazines ===
- Manila Envelope
- Flip (as Editor-in-Chief

== Filmography ==
=== Television ===
- Points of View, Studio 23

== Other works ==
=== CDs ===
- Twisted's Greatest Hits

=== Radio shows ===
- Twisted on a Sunday, 103.5 K-Lite FM

== Awards ==
- 1991 Palanca Award, 1st Place, Short Story Category for "Portents"
- 1993 Palanca Award, 3rd Place, Short Story Category for "Bad Boy, Robin, Baad, Baad Boy"
- 1994 Palanca Award, 3rd Place, Short Story Category for "Black"
