= 2006 Palanca Awards =

Philippine literary award

56th Palanca Awards
- Date: September 1, 2006
- Location: Dusit Hotel Nikko, Makati, Philippines

The 56th Don Carlos Palanca Memorial Awards for Literature was held on September 1, 2006, at the Dusit Hotel Nikko in Makati to commemorate the memory of Don Carlos Palanca Sr. through an endeavor that would promote education and culture in the country. National Artist for Literature Edith Tiempo was Guest of Honor and Speaker at this year’s awarding ceremony.

LIST OF WINNERS

The 2006 winners are divided into four categories:

== English Division ==
=== Short Story ===
- First Prize: Socorro Villanueva, "Mahogany Water"
- Second Prize: Myrza Sison, "Sink or Swim"
- Third Prize: Ma. Celeste Flores-Coscolluela, "Trips"

=== Future Fiction ===
- First Prize: No Winner
- Second Prize: Corinna Esperanza A. Nuqui, "Suman"
- Third Prize: Arturo Ilano, "A Monumental Race"

=== Short Story for Children ===
- First Prize: Ma. Celeste Flores-Coscolluela, "Cut"
- Second Prize: Grace Dacanay Chong, "Big Brother"
- Third Prize: Dean Francis Alfar, "How Rosang Taba Won a Race"

=== Poetry ===
- First Prize: Lawrence L. Ypil, "The Highest Hiding Place"
- Second Prize: Sid G. Hildawa, "Building a House, and Other Poems"
- Third Prize: Raymundo T. Pandan Jr., "Illuminations and Sonorities"

=== Essay ===
- First Prize: Jose Edmundo O. Reyes, "Fungibility, Dead Souls and OCWs"
- Second Prize: Edgardo B. Maranan, "Hometown Stories and Footnotes to Childhood’s End"
- Third Prize: Martin V. Villanueva, "He’d Rather be Relevant"

=== One-Act Play ===
- First Prize: Steven Prince C. Fernandez, "Ming Ming"
- Second Prize: Joachim Emilio B. Antonio, "Gabrielle"
- Third Prize: Nikki Alfar, "Life After Beth"

=== Full-Length Play ===
- First Prize: Glenn S. Mas, "The Death of Memory"
- Second Prize: Amelia L. Bonifacio, "Chinchina and the Five Mountains"
- Third Prize: Maria Clarissa Estuar, "Ask Me Again When I’m Thirty"

== Filipino Division ==
=== Maikling Kwento ===
- First prize: Eros S. Atalia, "Si Intoy Syokoy ng Kalye Marino"
- Second prize: Kristian Sendon Cordero, "Langaw"
- Third prize: Edgardo B. Maranan, "Buwan at Lupa"

=== Future Fiction [Filipino] ===
- First Prize: Michael Francis C. Andrada, "Tala-Huli/Huling Tala: Si Manong, Sa Dyip, Ang Drayber at Ako, Ako Lang Naman, Ang Kanyang Pasahero"
- Second Prize: Enrique C. Villasis, "De-Lata"
- Third Prize: Vladimeir B. Gonzales, "Lunes, Alas Diyes ng Umaga"

=== Maikling Kwentong Pambata ===
- First Prize: Bernadette V. Neri, "Ang Ikaklit sa Aming Hardin"
- Second Prize: Maynard G. Manasala, "Taguan-Pung"
- Third Prize: Allan Alberto N. Derain, "Ang Regalo ng Taong Ibon"

=== Tula ===
- First Prize: Rebecca T. Añonuevo, "Sa Tanda ng Pagsisimula ng Buhay"
- Second Prize: Maria Josephine C. Barrios, "Salit-salitang mga Tula ng Pagsulyap, Pakikibaka at Paglingap"
- Third Prize: Emmanuel V. Dumlao, "Salamangka ng Santelmo"

=== Sanaysay ===
- First Prize: Rosario Torres-Yu, "Batang Tundo"
- Second Prize: Elyrah L. Salanga, "Talambalay"
- Third Prize: Ramon M. Bernardo, "Alingawngaw ng mga Kuliglig, Kalansing ng mga Tansan"

=== Dulang May Isang Yugto ===
- First Prize: Job A. Pagsibigan, "The Palanca in My Mind"
- Second Prize: Joel V. Almazan, "Aba Ginoong Mag-asawa"
- Third Prize: Christian U. Tordecillas, "Dyip"

=== Dulang Ganap ang Haba ===
- First Prize: Ma. Josephine C. Barrios, "Gabriela"
- Second Prize: Timothy Dacanay, "Teatro Porvenir"
- Third Prize: Liza Magtoto, "'Nay Isa"

=== Dulang Pantelebisyon ===
- First Prize: Rodolfo R. Lana Jr., "Milagroso"
- Second Prize: Jose Dennis C. Teodosio, "Pulo"
- Third prize: Bonifacio P. Ilagan, "Negatibo"

=== Dulang Pampelikula ===
- First Prize: Cenon O. Palomares, "Kusina"
- Second Prize: Jim Libiran, "Tribu"
- Third Prize: Carlos A. Arejola, "Ang Mundo ay Iisa at Marami"

== Regional Division ==
=== Short Story [Cebuano] ===
- First Prize: Lamberto Ceballos, "Ang Ungo sa San Pilar"
- Second Prize: Richel G. Dorotan, "Dayaspora"
- Third prize: Eleazar T. Acampado, "Mata sa Bagyo"

=== Short Story [Hiligaynon] ===
- First Prize: Leoncio P. Deriada, "Duta para sa mga Iskolar sang Banwa"
- Second prize: Peter Solis Nery, "Ang Kapid"
- Third prize: Bryan Mari Argos, "Sagal-i"

=== Short Story [Iluko] ===
- First Prize: Bernardo D. Tabbada, "Nabungon Iti Lawag"
- Second Prize: Danilo B. Antalan, "Tugot"
- Third Prize: Arnold P. Jose, "Ni Ina Baket Gimma, Ti Aso, ken Ti Atang"

== Kabataan Division ==
=== Kabataan Essay ===
- First Prize: Katrina G. Gomez, "Restructuring Idealism"
- Second Prize: Ryan Edward L. Chua, "Home"
- Third Prize: Hannah L. Co, "Coming Home"

=== Kabataan Sanaysay ===
- First Prize: No Winner
- Second Prize: Allan Jay. T. Allonar Jr., "Ang Pangako kay Asterz"
- Third Prize: No Winner

== Sources ==
- "The Don Carlos Palanca Memorial Awards for Literature | Winners 2006". Archived from the original on 2009-10-27.
