= Edgar Calabia Samar =

Philippine poet and novelist

- Born: February 18, 1981 (age 45); San Pablo, Laguna, Philippines
- Occupations: Novelist, Poet, Teacher
- Writing career
- Genres: Novel, Young Adult, Poetry
- Website: www.edgarcsamar.com

Edgar Calabia Samar (born 1981) is a poet and novelist from San Pablo City, Philippines. He has received the Philippine National Book Awards for his novels and book of criticism, and the Palanca Awards for his poetry collections and short fiction. His novels Sa Kasunod ng 909, Si Janus Silang at ang Tiyanak ng Tabon and Si Janus Silang at ang Labanang Manananggal-Mambabarang all won the Philippine National Book Awards for Best Novel in a Philippine Language in 2012, 2015, and 2016, respectively. He has been awarded the PBBY-Salanga Writer's Prize, the NCCA Writer's Prize for the Novel, the Gantimpalang Collantes sa Sanaysay and the Gawad Surian sa Tula.

His poetry books, Pag-aabang sa Kundiman: Isang Tulambuhay and Samantalang Sakop at Iniibig: Panibagong Tulambuhay were both nominated for the Philippine National Book Awards. His children's story Uuwi na ang Nanay Kong si Darna has been adapted into a play and was staged at the Cultural Center of the Philippines as part of the Virgin Labfest in July 2008. The same story was also adapted for television in a storytelling segment of GMA-7's Art Angel episode on May 29, 2008. The plot was described by the Philippine Board on Books for Young People as "Popoy counts the day to his mother’s homecoming from her overseas job and fantasizes the Darna powers his supermom has".

Samar's book, Walong Diwata ng Pagkahulog, was awarded the 2005 NCCA Writer's Prize; its translation to English as Eight Muses of the Fall was longlisted in the 2009 Man Asian Literary Prize. Samar was a fellow of the International Writing Program of the University of Iowa.

== Biography ==
Samar was born on 18 February 1981 in San Pablo City, Philippines. He attended a diocesan catholic school, the Liceo de San Pablo, from grade school to high school (1988–1998) before he entered the Ateneo de Manila University where he finished his AB in Psychology (2002) and MA in Filipino Literature (2004). In Ateneo, he became a member of Heights for four years (1998–2002). He received his Doctor of Philosophy from the University of the Philippines in Diliman, which awarded him the Gawad Antonio Abad for Best Dissertation in 2011.

Samar has taught Philippine Literature and Creative Writing at the Ateneo de Manila University since 2011. He was president of Linangan sa Imahen, Retorika at Anyo in 2002–2004, and now acts as moderator of Heights. He has been panelist to several national writers' workshops in the Philippines. He directed the 7th Ateneo National Writers' Workshop held in October 2007 at the Sacred Heart Novitiate in Quezon City. He lives in Marikina.

He has read his poetry on a podcast.

== Published works ==
=== Books ===
- Si Janus Sílang at ang Tiyanak ng Tábon (Adarna House, 2014)
- Eight Muses of the Fall (Anvil Publishing, 2013)
- Halos Isang Búhay: Ang Manananggal sa Pagsusulat ng Nobela (UST Publishing House, 2012)
- Sa Kasunod ng 909 (UST Publishing House, 2012)
- Walong Diwata ng Pagkahulog (Anvil Publishing, 2009)
- Pag-aabang sa Kundiman: Isang Tulambuhay (ADMU Office of Research and Publications, 2006)
- Isa na Namang Pagtingala sa Buwan (National Commission for Culture and the Arts, 2005)
- Uuwi na ang Nanay Kong si Darna! (Adarna House, 2002).

=== Poetry ===
- "Kuwentong-Bayan" in Literatura 8: Tha Palanca 2004 Issue
- "Walang Diwata ng Apoy" in Literatura 8: The Palanca 2004 Issue
- "2000" in High Chair 5 (July–December 2005)
- "Gnosis" in Tinig Volume 35

=== Essay ===
- "Si Big Brother, Si Boy Bastos, at ang Pagsasalba ng Katawan sa Textong Popular Ayon Kay Antonio Pigafetta" in Malay 20, No. 1 (2007)
- "Paghawak sa Panahon: Ang Salaysay Bilang Talinghaga sa Tula" in Loyola Schools Review 6 (2007)

=== Serialized novel ===
- Kasaysayan ng (2019)

== Awards, grants, fellowships ==
- 2010 International Writing Program, Fellow
- Man Asian Literary Prize, Longlist for "Eight Muses of the Fall"
- 2007 Gantimpalang Collantes sa Sanaysay, Second Prize for "Tungo sa Pag-awit ng Inadung"
- 2007 46th UP National Writers' Workshop, Fellow for Poetry in Filipino
- 2005 NCCA Writer's Prize, Grand Prize for Walong Diwata ng Pagkahulog
- 2004 Gawad Surian sa Tula, Grand Prize for "Kung Bakit Tayo Nakikinig sa Alamat"
- 2004 PBBY-Salanga Writer's Prize, Honorable Mention for "Magkano Papuntang Antipolo?"
- 2004 Palanca Awards for Poetry in Filipino, First Prize for "Tayong Lumalakad Nang Matulin"
- 2003 Palanca Awards for Future Fiction in Filipino, Second Prize for "Project: EYOD"
- 2003 1st Iyas-La Salle National Writers' Workshop, Fellow for Poetry in Filipino
- 2002 Palanca Awards for Poetry in Filipino, Second Prize for "Pag-aabang sa Kundiman at Iba Pang Tula"
- 2002 PBBY-Salanga Writer's Prize, Grand Prize for "Uuwi na ang Nanay Kong si Darna!"
- 2001 38th UP National Writers' Workshop, Fellow for Poetry in Filipino
- 2000 1st UST National Writers' Workshop, Fellow for Poetry in Filipino
- 1999 6th Ateneo-Heights Writers' Workshop, Fellow for Poetry in Filipino
- 1997 National Schools Press Conference, Second Place for Editorial Writing in Filipino
