= Cirilo Bautista =

Filipino poet, critic and writer (1941-2018

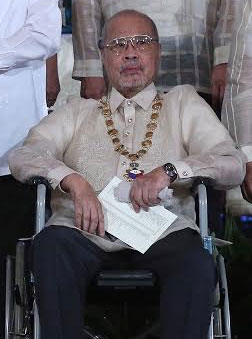
- Bautista on 2016
- Born: July 9, 1941; Manila, Commonwealth of the Philippines
- Died: May 6, 2018 (aged 76); Manila, Philippines
- Resting place: Libingan ng mga Bayani
- Education: University of Santo Tomas; St. Louis University; De La Salle University-Manila
- Writing career
- Notable awards: Order of National Artists of the Philippines

Cirilo F. Bautista (July 9, 1941 – May 6, 2018) was a Filipino poet, critic and writer of nonfiction. A National Artist of the Philippines award was conferred on him in 2014.

== Early life and education ==
Bautista was born in Manila on July 9, 1941, and spent his childhood in Balic-Balic, Sampaloc.

== Career ==
Bautista taught creative writing and literature at St. Louis University (1963–1968) and the University of Santo Tomas (1969–1970) before moving to De La Salle University-Manila in 1970. He is also a co-founding member of the Philippine Literary Arts Council (PLAC) and a member of the Manila Critics Circle, Philippine Center of International PEN and the Philippine Writers Academy.

== Death ==
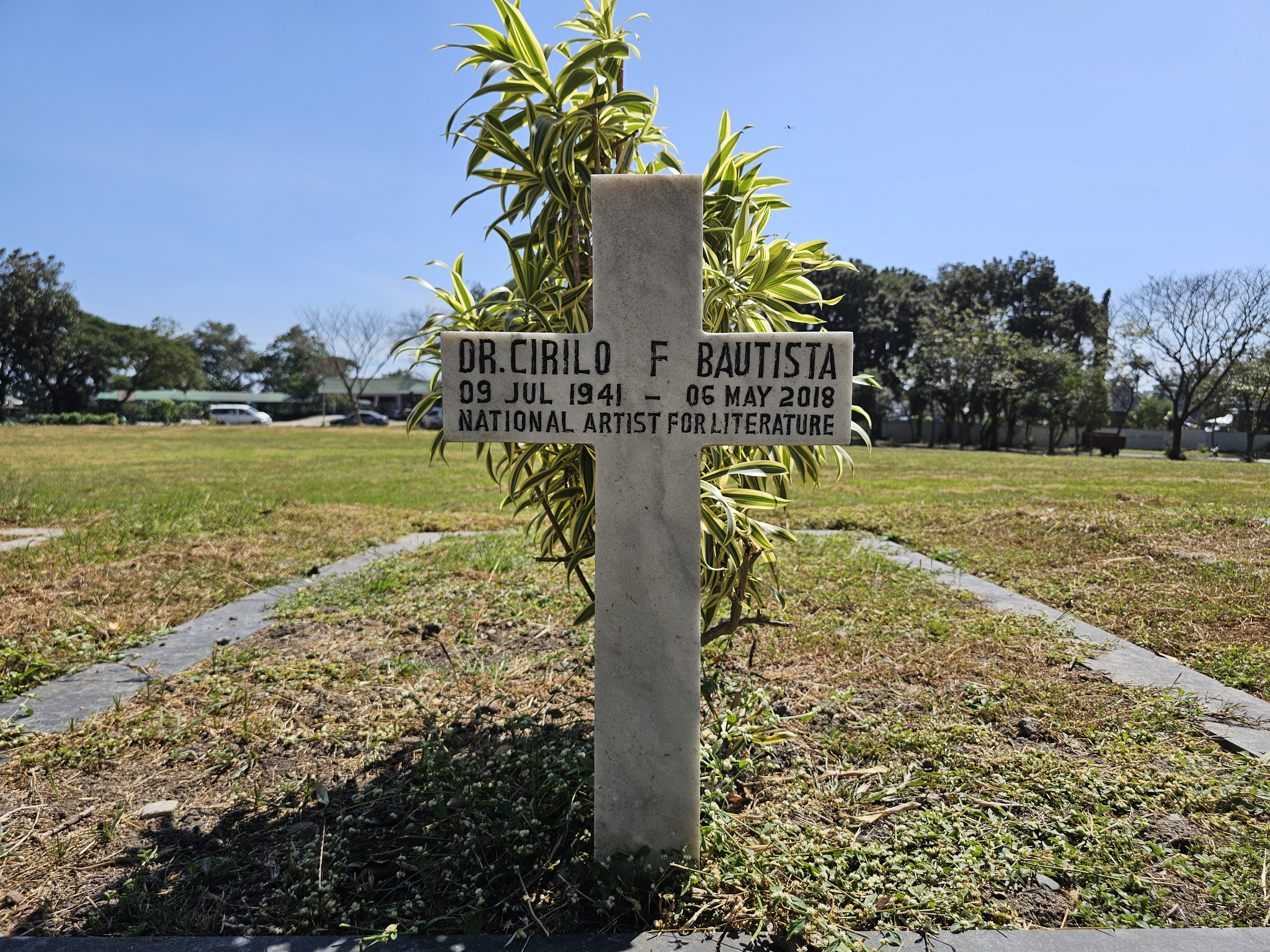

Bautista died on May 6, 2018. He was laid to rest following a state funeral at the Libingan ng mga Bayani.

== Personal life ==
Cirilo Bautista was married to Rosemarie Bautista and had three children.

== Works ==
=== Poetry ===
- Summer Suns (with Albert Casuga, 1963)
- The Cave and Other Poems (1968)
- The Archipelago (1970)
- Charts (1973)
- Telex Moon (1981)
- Sugat ng Salita (1986)
- Boneyard Breaking: New Collected Poems (1990)
- Kirot ng Kataga (1995)
- Sunlight on Broken Stones (1999)
- The Trilogy of Saint Lazarus (2001)
- Tinik Sa Dila: Isang Katipunan ng mga Tula (2003)
- Believe and Betray: New and Collected Poems (2007)
- Things Happen: Poems 2012 (2014)
- In Many Ways: Poems, 2012-2016 (2017)
- Third World Geography
- Pedagogic (2008)
- Villanelle For Old Men

=== Fiction ===
- Stories (1990)
- Galaw ng Asoge (2004)

=== Literary Theory and Cultural Studies ===
- Breaking Signs (1990)
- Words and Battlefields: A Theoria on the Poem (1998)
- The Estrella D. Alfon Anthology Vol. I – Short Stories (2000)
- Bullets and Roses: The Poetry Of Amado V. Hernandez / A Bilingual Edition (translated Into English and with a critical introduction) (2003)

== Awards, Prizes and Honors ==
- First Prize in Epic Writing English Category, of the National Centennial Commission's Literary Contests, 1998, sponsored by the Philippine Government. The judges in this prestigious contest, held to commemorate the Centennial of our freedom, gave the prize to Bautista's Sunlight on Broken Stones, the last volume in his The Trilogy of Saint Lazarus. This epic of 3,050 lines concludes his monumental work on Philippine history.
- In 1999, Sunlight on Broken Stones, published by De La Salle University-Manila Press, garnered the National Book Award given by the Manila Critics Circle and the Gintong Aklat Award given by the Book Development Association of the Philippines
- Hall of Fame of the Palanca Awards Foundation for achievements in the field of literature, 1995. This is given to Filipino writers who have distinguished themselves by winning at least five First Prizes in the Palanca Literary Contests.
- Don Carlos Palanca Memorial Awards for Literature nine (9) times for poetry, fiction and essay. His prize-winning works include: Philippine Poetics: The Past Eight Years (essay), 1981; Crossworks (collected poems), 1979; Charts (collected poems), 1973; The Archipelago (epic poem), 1970; Telex Moon (epic poem), 1975; The Cave and Other Poems (collected poems), 1968; and the short stories Ritual and The Man Who Made a Covenant with the Wind.
- National Book Award given by the Manila Critics Circle five (5) times, for The Archipelago, Sugat ng Salita, Sunlight on Broken Stones, The Trilogy of Saint Lazarus and Tinik sa Dila.
- Diwa ng Lahi, Gawad Antonio Villegas at Patnubay ng Sining at Kalinangan in the field of literature by the City of Manila. This award is given to outstanding Manila artists who have contributed to the advancement of arts and culture. 430th Araw ng Maynila, June 22, 2001, Bulwagang Villegas, Manila City Hall.
- Gawad Balagtas in 1997 by the Unyon ng mga Manunulat ng Pilipinas for Bautista's achievements as a poet, fictionist, and critic.
- Included in Who’s Who in the World, 1996, New Providence, New Jersey, U.S.
- Makata ng Taon 1993, sponsored by the Komisyon ng mga Wikang Pilipinas with the poem Ulat Buhat Sa Bulkan. With this and his Palanca award for Tagalog poetry and his winning the First Prize in the Poetry contest sponsored by the Dyaryo Filipino with his poem, Ilang Aeta Mula Sa Botolan, Bautista affirmed his importance as a bilingual writer.
- Included in The Oxford Companion to the English Language, edited by Tom MacArthur, Oxford University Press, 1992.
- Included in The Traveller’s Guide to Asian Literature, 1993.
- Knight Commander of Rizal by the Order of the Knights of Rizal, December 1998, in recognition of Bautista's literary works that helped propagate the ideas and achievements of the national hero. His The Trilogy of Saint Lazarus has the national hero as the main character and focal point in the author's poetic recreation of the development of the Filipino soul from the beginning of our history to the present.
- Adopted Son of Iligan City, 1997, by virtue of Executive Order #98 signed by Mayor Alejo Yanes, for his contribution “in the development of creative writing in Mindanao, for serving as a role model among young writers, as well as his tireless promotion of Iligan City as a center for literary arts in the Philippines.” Bautista was instrumental in the founding of the Iligan Writers Workshop and was its primary mover in attracting young writers to congregate in Mindanao and learn the craft of writing.
- Gawad Manuel L. Quezon in 1996 by the Quezon City Government in connection with the Quezon Day Celebrations for Bautista's outstanding achievement as writer, editor and teacher.
- Certificate of appreciation from the Benigno Aquino Jr., Foundation for his literary works that helped perpetuate the memory of the late senator
- St. Miguel Febres Cordero Research Award, SY2002-03 given by De La Salle University-Manila, 2002. This award was given to Bautista in recognition of his achievements in research and creative writing.
- First Annual Dove Award by the College of Liberal Arts, De La Salle University-Manila, February 14, 2001. An alumnus of the Graduate School of the university, Bautista was honored for the contributions he had in energizing the writing life in campus through his co-founding of the creative writing programs in the university and activities as Writer-in-Residence for fifteen years.
- Most Outstanding Achievement Award in Literature by the Philets-Artlets Centennial Alumni Association of the University of Santo Tomas, 1996.
- Most Outstanding Alumnus Award for Literature, Mapa High School Alumni Association, 1983.
- Pablo Roman Prize for his Novel-in-Progress entitled Reconstruction, 1982.
- Most Outstanding Alumnus Award for Literature from the Alumni Association of the College of Arts and Letters, University of Santo Tomas, 1982.
- Fernando Maria Guerrero Award for Literature, University of Santo Tomas Alumni Association, 1980.
- Most Outstanding Alumnus Award for Literature, Graduate School, Saint Louis University, 1975.
- British Council Fellowship as Visiting Writer, Trinity College, Cambridge, England, 1987. Bautista was the first Filipino writer to be invited to attend the Cambridge Seminar on Contemporary Literature.
- Honorary Fellow in Creative Writing, University of Iowa, U.S., 1969
- Visiting Professor at Waseda University, Japan and Ohio University, U.S.
