= 2002 Palanca Awards =

Philippine literary award

52nd Palanca Awards
- Date: September 1, 2002
- Location: The Peninsula Manila, Makati, Philippines

The 52nd Don Carlos Palanca Memorial Awards for Literature was held on September 1, 2002, at The Peninsula Manila in Makati to commemorate the memory of Don Carlos Palanca Sr. through an endeavor that would promote education and culture in the country. Former Education Secretary Raul Roco was Guest of Honor and Speaker at this year’s awarding ceremony.

List of Winners

The 2002 winners are divided into four categories:

== English Division ==
=== Novel ===
- Grand Prize: Vicente Garcia Groyon, The Sky Over Dimas

=== Short Story ===
- First Prize: Socorro A. Villanueva, "We Won't Cry About This"
- Second Prize: Ian Rosales Casocot, "Old Movies"
- Third Prize: Edgar B. Maranan, "Doomsday"

=== Future Fiction ===
- First Prize: Raissa Claire U. Rivera, "Virtual Center"
- Second Prize: David Peter Jose J. Hontiveros, "Kaming mga Seroks"
- Third Prize: Baryon Tensor Posadas, "Mall"

=== Short Story for Children ===
- First Prize: Luis Joaquin M. Katigbak, "Mico and Friends"
- Second Prize: Raissa Claire U. Rivera, "The Slipper"
- Third Prize: Herbeth Fondevilla, "The Peace Crane"

=== Poetry ===
- First Prize: Paolo Manalo, "Jolography"
- Second Prize: Anthony L. Tan, "Crossing the River and Other Poems"
- Third Prize: Mariano L. Kilates, "Things of Light"

=== Essay ===
- First Prize: Melba Padilla Maggay, "Death and Early Sorrow"
- Second Prize: Pareto Oliver B. Patacsil II, "Bread and Quiz Shows"
- Third Prize: Noel P. Pingoy, "Becoming a Hematologist"

=== One-Act Play ===
- First Prize: No Winner
- Second Prize: Joseph Israel M. Laban, "The Day Lola Lilia Finished Weaving"
- Third Prize: Hans Leo J. Cacdac, "Choosers of the Slain"

=== Full-Length Play ===
- First Prize: No Winner
- Second Prize: Francis Tanglao-Aguas, "When the Purple Settles"
- Third Prize: Christopher Q. Gozum, "The Pasyon of Pedro Calosa and the Tayug Colorum Uprising of 1931"

== Filipino Division ==
=== Nobela ===
- Grand Prize: Norman Wilwayco, Kung Paano Ko Inayos ang Buhok Ko Matapos ang Mahaba-haba Ring Paglalakbay

=== Maikling Kwento ===
- First Prize: Marco A.V. Lopez, "Bukbok"
- Second Prize: Jerry Arcega-Gracio, "Isda"
- Third Prize: Pat V. Villafuerte, "Huling Hiling, Hinaing at Halinghing ni Hermano Huseng"

=== Future Fiction [Filipino] ===
- First Prize: Alvin B. Yapan, "Apokalipsis"
- Second Prize: Alwin C. Aguirre, "Semi-Kalbo"
- Third Prize: Jimmuel C. Naval, "Mr. Doily"

=== Maikling Kwentong Pambata ===
- First Prize: Genaro R. Gojo Cruz, "Ang Lumang Aparador"
- Second Prize: Joseph Patrick V. Arevalo, "Pagbibilang sa Bookstore"
- Third Prize: Enrico C. Torralba, "Ang Ama ni Pando"

=== Tula ===
- First Prize: Roberto T. Añonuevo, "Estalon at Iba Pang Simoy ng Bait"
- Second Prize: Edgar Calabia Samar, "Pag-aabang sa Kundiman at Iba Pang Tula"
- Third Prize: Jerry Arcega-Gracio, "Sinaunang Pag-ibig sa Apoy"

=== Sanaysay ===
- First Prize: Luis P. Gatmaitan, "Tuwing Miyerkules"
- Second Prize: Neil Bustamante Campos, "Paano Nga Ba Kung Matanda Ka Na?"
- Third Prize: Michael M. Coroza, "Si Nanay, Si Lolo Ceferino, Ang Lira, at si Eliot o ang Henesis ng Aking Pananaludtod"

=== Dulang May Isang Yugto ===
- First Prize: Nathaniel Joseph F. De Mesa, "SubTEXT"
- Second Prize: Harlene Charmaine Bautista-Tejedor, "Kasal, Sakal, Xenical"
- Third Prize: Salvador T. Biglaen, "Ang Bayani ng Hannaga"

=== Dulang Ganap Ang Haba ===
- First Prize: Liza C. Magtoto, "Agnoia"
- Second Prize: George A. De Jesus III, "Sala sa Pito"
- Third Prize: Edward Perez, "Teatro Porvenir"

=== Dulang Pantelebisyon ===
- First Prize: Vincent Kua, "Shashin Lolabye"
- Second Prize: Joel V. Almazan, "Balikbayan Box"
- Third Prize: Lynda Casimiro, "Supectibol"

=== Dulang Pampelikula ===
- First Prize: Michael Angelo P. Dagñalan, "Isnatser!"
- Second Prize: Jose Dennis C. Teodosio, "Tanso at bronse"
- Third Prize: Agustin del Mundo Sugatan Jr., "Fire Crackers"

== Regional Division ==
=== Short Story [Cebuano] ===
- First Prize: Rolando S. Salvaña, "Libat"
- Second Prize: Sheilfa B. Alojamiento, "Ang Mga Babaye sa Among Baryo"
- Third Prize: Ernesto D. Lariosa, "Sakdapanay"

=== Short Story [Hiligaynon] ===
- First Prize: Alice Tan Gonzales, "Sa Taguangkan Sang Duta"
- Second Prize: Genevieve L. Asenjo, "taga-uma@manila"
- Third Prize: John Iremil E. Teodoro, "Anghel Sang Capiz"

=== Short Story [Iluko] ===
- First Prize: Lorenzo G. Tabin, "Puon"
- Second Prize: William V. Alvarado, "Alipugpog 1762-1765"
- Third Prize: Eden Aquino Alviar, "Salmo"

== Kabataan Division ==
=== Kabataan Essay ===
- First Prize: Enrico Miguel T. Subido, "Waging War for Humanity: The Battle for Peace"
- Second Prize: Monica S. Macansantos, "My Brush with Eugenics"
- Third Prize: Patricia Nicole J. Golez, "World Peace in My Own Little Way, Bow"

=== Kabataan Sanaysay ===
- First Prize: Margaret P. Yarcia, "Kabataang Mandirigma"
- Second Prize: Lester John Cariaga Lim, "Pandaigdigang Kapayapaan: Kabataan Game Ka Na Ba?"
- Third Prize: Ivan D.J. Josue, "Mangarap Ka Nang Gising"

== Sources ==
- "The Don Carlos Palanca Memorial Awards for Literature | Winners 2002". Archived from the original on 2009-10-21.
