= Ricardo de Ungria =

Filipino poet

- Born: 1951 (age 74–75)
- Occupation: Poet, professor
- Education: De La Salle University; Washington University in St. Louis

Ricardo "Ricky" Monreal De Ungria (born 1951) is a Filipino poet.

== Early life and education ==
De Ungria was born in 1951 and raised in Paco, Manila. He did spoken word poetry and performed in a rock band in the 1970s. He graduated with a Bachelor's degree cum laude in Literature from the De La Salle University. In 1990, while on a Fulbright Scholarship in the United States, he was awarded an MFA in creative writing from Washington University in St. Louis. He received writing residency fellowships at the Hawthornden Castle International Retreat for Writers in 1991 and the Bellagio Study of Conference Center in 1993.

== Career ==
In 1999, he moved to Davao City to become the first dean of the College of Humanities and Social Sciences of the newly established University of the Philippines Mindanao campus. In the same year, he founded the Davao Writers Guild, which publishes the works of its members; holds poetry readings; and hosts the Davao Writing Workshops, which started in 2005. The Guild has been publishing Cebuano, Filipino, Davaoeño, Karay-a, and English works in the literary journal Dagmay since 2001. In 2006, they began publishing a monthly literary supplement in SunStar Davao. While serving as Chancellor of UP Mindanao (2001-2007), he also organized the Davao Colleges and Universities Network (DACUN) in 2001 and the Mindanao Studies Consortium Foundation, Inc. (MSCFI) in 2003, both being a consortium of universities in the Davao and Mindanao regions, respectively. In 2004, he also organized the Mindanao Science and Technology Park Consortium Foundation, Inc. that was a consortium of academic institutions and government agencies in the Mintal area of Davao. He had retired from formally teaching creative writing and literature at U.P. Mindanao by 2018.

From 2007 to 2010, de Ungria served as Festival Director of Philippine International Arts Festivals. Around this time, he also sat on the board of judges for the Palanca Awards and chaired the Mindanao Science and Technology Park Consortium. He was a founding member of Philippine Literary Arts Council (PLAC) in 1981, and a member of the Unyon ng mga Manunulat sa Pilipinas (UMPIL). He headed the Committee on Literary Arts at the National Commission for Culture and the Arts (NCCA), where he became a Commissioner for the Arts in 2009. In 2015 and 2016, he served as director-in-residence of Silliman University's National Writers Workshop. For many years, he was a fellow of the University of the Philippines Institute of Creative Writing in UP Diliman. He has served as a panelist in various writing workshops, including the UP Diliman, Silliman University, Davao Writers Guild, and the Ateneo de Davao Writers workshops. For his achievements in literature and writing, he was awarded the Gawad Balagtas by the UMPIL in 1999 and the Patnubay ng Sining at Kalinangan (Literature) by the City of Manila in 2007. He was also UP Artist 1 from 2009 to 2011 and 2012 to the present time and the recipient of nine National Book Awards as of 2025.

== Selected works ==
Poetry

- R+A+D+I+O (1986)
- Decimal Places (1991), ISBN 9789712701030
- Voideville: Selected Poems, 1974–79 (1991), ISBN 9789718577851
- Nudes: Poems (1994), ISBN 9789712703324
- Body English (1996), ISBN 9789715421034
- Waking Ice: Poems (2000), ISBN 9789712709913
- Pidgin Levitations (2004), ISBN 9789715424110
- m'mry wire (2013), ISBN 9789715067089

Anthology (as editor)

- Luna Caledonia: Five Filipino Writers in Hawthornden Castle (1992), ISBN 9789718872000
- Passionate Patience: Ten Filipino Poets on the Writing of Their Poems (1995), ISBN 9712704297 and 9789712704284
- Catfish Arriving in Little Schools (1996), ISBN 9789712705106
- The Likhaan Book of Poetry and Fiction 1996 (1997), ISBN 9789715421997
- The Likhaan Book of Poetry and Fiction 1999 (2001) with Jose Dalisay Jr., ISBN 9789715423328
- The Likhaan Anthology of Philippine Literature in English from 1900 to the Present (2002) with Gémino Abad, ISBN 9715422144
- Fallen Cradle: Parents on the loss of a child (2006) with Agnes Prieto, ISBN 9789712717321
- Davao Harvest 2 (2008) with Tita Lacambra-Ayala, ISBN 9711006553
- The Best of Dagmay (2007–2009) (2010), ISBN 9718142231
- Tala Mundi: The Collected Poems of Tita Agcaoili Lacambra Ayala (2011), ISBN 9789715065924
- Habagatanon: Conversations with Six Davao Writers (2015), ISBN 9789715427746
- Voices on the Waters: Conversations with Five Mindanao Writers (2018), ISBN 9789715508650
- Songs Sprung from Native Soils (2019), ISBN 9789719094319
- Mindanao Harvest 4: A 21st Century Literary Anthology (2022) with Jaime An Lim and Christine F. Godinez-Ortega, ISBN 9789716780628
- Kalandrakas Part 1, 1890-1945: Stories and Storytellers of/on Regions in Mindanao, 1890-1990 (2022), ISBN 9786214482016
- Kalandrakas Part 2, 1946-1990: Stories and Storytellers of/on Regions in Mindanao, 1890-1990 (2022), ISBN 9786214481996

== Honors and awards ==
Year	Award	Work	Awarding body	Notes	Ref
1974	Palanca Awards Second Prize in Poetry	Boxes	Palanca Memorial Awards Committee	Tied for second with Gilbert Luis R. Centina III	
1976	Palanca Awards Second Prize in Poetry	Poyms Tch Tch Passwords	Palanca Memorial Awards Committee		
1979	Palanca Awards Second Prize in Poetry	Nova Blum	Palanca Memorial Awards Committee		
1980	Palanca Awards Second Prize in Poetry	R+A+D+I+O	Palanca Memorial Awards Committee	Tied for second with Gémino Abad	
1987	Fulbright Scholar		Bureau of Educational and Cultural Affairs	Earned his MFA at Washington University in St. Louis	
1988	Academy of American Poets Prize: Honorable Mention		Academy of American Poets		
1988	State Street Poetry Contest: Honorable Mention		Florida State University		
1989	First Prize	Saint Louis Poetry Center Annual Contest			
1990	Palanca Awards First Prize in Poetry	Body English and Decimal Places	Palanca Memorial Awards Committee		
1991	Hawthornden Writing Residency		Hawthornden Foundation		
1993	Bellagio Writing Residency		Rockefeller Foundation	Worked on two volumes of poetry, Nudes and Body English	
1994	National Book Awards: Poetry	Nudes: Poems	Manila Critics' Circle and National Book Development Board		
1996	National Book Awards: Poetry	Body English	Manila Critics' Circle and National Book Development Board		
1999	Gawad Pambansang Alagad ni Balagtas		Unyon ng mga Manunulat sa Pilipinas		
2000	National Book Awards: Poetry	Waking Ice	Manila Critics' Circle and National Book Development Board		
2005	National Book Awards: Design		Manila Critics' Circle and National Book Development Board		
2007	Patnubay ng Sining at Kalinangan (Literature)		City of Manila		
2012	National Book Awards: Poetry in English	Tala Mundi: The Collected Poems of Tita Agcaoili Lacambra Ayala	Manila Critics' Circle and National Book Development Board		
2013	UP Artist I for Literature		University of Philippines		
2014	National Book Awards: Poetry in English	m’mry wire	Manila Critics' Circle and National Book Development Board		
2015	International Writers’ Residency		Sun Yat-sen University		
2016	National Book Awards: Best Anthology in English	Habagatanon: Conversations with Six Davao Writers	Manila Critics' Circle and National Book Development Board	Editor	
2018	Southeast Asian Writers Award		ASEAN		
2019	National Book Awards: Best Anthology in English	Voices on the Waters: Conversations with Five Mindanao Writers	Manila Critics' Circle and National Book Development Board	Editor	
2020	Ani ng Dangal for Literary Arts		National Commission for Culture and the Arts		
2022	National Book Awards: Best Anthology in English	Mindanao Harvest 4	Manila Critics' Circle and National Book Development Board	Editor	
2023	National Book Awards: Best Anthology in English	Kalandrakas: Stories and Storytellers of/on Regions in Mindanao, Parts I and II	Manila Critics' Circle and National Book Development Board	Editor	
?	CCP Verse-Writing Contest				
?	Philippines Free Press Awards		Philippines Free Press		

== Personal life ==
De Ungria's son Nikos died by suicide in 1998. Several of his subsequent poems focus heavily on this topic.
