= 2005 Palanca Awards =

Philippine literary award

55th Palanca Awards
- Date: September 1, 2005
- Location: The Peninsula Manila, Makati, Philippines

The 55th Don Carlos Palanca Memorial Awards for Literature was held on September 1, 2005, at The Peninsula Manila in Makati to commemorate the memory of Don Carlos Palanca Sr. through an endeavor that would promote education and culture in the country. Dr. Emerlinda Roman, the first female president of the University of the Philippines, was a Guest of Honor and Speaker at this year’s awarding ceremony.

Rodolfo R. Lana Jr., Manuel R. Buising, and Luis P. Gatmaitan were this year's Palanca Hall of Fame awardees. Lana clinched his fifth first prize for “Milagroso” under the Dulang Pantelebisyon category. Buising clinched his fifth first prize for “Niños Inocentes” also under the Dulang Pantelebisyon category. And Gatmaitan clinched his fifth first prize for “Tapok at Banlik” under the Sanaysay category. The award is given to writers who have won five first places in any category.

The 2005 winners are divided into four categories:

== English Division ==
=== Novel ===
- Grand Prize: Dean Francis Alfar, Salamanca

=== Short Story ===
- First Prize: Alexis Abola, "The Shakespeare Guy"
- Second Prize: Lakambini A. Sitoy, "Shut Up and Live"
- Third Prize: Maryanne Moll, "At Merienda"

=== Future Fiction ===
- First Prize: Karen Manalastas, "Treasure Islands"
- Second Prize: Pia R. Roxas, "Last Bus Ride"
- Third Prize: Pearlsha Abubakar, "Espiritu Santos"

=== Short Story for Children ===
- First Prize: Grace Dacanay-Chong, "No Lipstick for Mother"
- Second Prize: Raissa Claire U. Rivera, "The Dancers of Malumbay"
- Third Prize: Nikki Alfar, "Menggay’s Magical Chicken"

=== Poetry ===
- First Prize: Joel M. Toledo, "What Little I Know of Luminosity"
- Second Prize: Naya S. Valdellon, "Evasions"
- Third Prize: Ana Maria Katigbak, "The Proxy Eros"

=== Essay ===
- First Prize: Lakambini A. Sitoy, "From the Outlands with Love"
- Second Prize: Aurelio S. Agcaoili, "Metaphor Man and Migrant, I"
- Third Prize: Maria Angela Nicole S. Perreras, "Thorn"

=== One-Act Play ===
- First Prize: Alfonso I. Dacanay, "First Snow of November"
- Second Prize: Glenn Sevilla Mas, "Children of the Sea"
- Third Prize: Chris Martinez, "Welcome to Intelstar"

=== Full-Length Play ===
- First Prize: Glenn Sevilla Mas, "In the Land of the Giants"
- Second Prize: Ma. Clarissa N. Estuar, "Jyan Ken Pon"
- Third Prize: Allan Lopez, "Something Happened"

== Filipino Division ==
=== Nobela ===
- Grand Prize: Ellen Sicat, Unang Ulan ng Mayo

=== Maikling Kwento ===
- First Prize: Agustin Pagusara Jr., “Mga Landas Ng Pangarap”
- Second Prize: Domingo G. Landicho, “Anay Sa Dagat Na Asul”
- Third Prize: John Iremil E. Teodoro, “Ang Santo Niño Na Walang Ulo”

=== Future Fiction [Filipino] ===
- First Prize: No Winner
- Second Prize: No Winner
- Third Prize: Dick Garcia Enoya, “Vic”

=== Maikling Kwentong Pambata ===
- First Prize: Eugene Evasco, “Tag-araw ng mga Ibong Hilaga”
- Second Prize: Edgardo B. Maranan, “Ang Batang Nanaginip Na Siya’y Nakalilipad”
- Third Prize: Perry C. Mangilaya, “Ang Kahon Ni Lolo Yoyong”

=== Tula ===
- First Prize: Joseph Rosmon M. Tuazon, “Sa Pagitan ng Emerhensiya”
- Second Prize: Rebecca T. Anonuevo, “Buong Buo”
- Third Prize: Mesandel Virtusio Arguelles, “Una Prosa”

=== Sanaysay ===
- First Prize: Luis Gatmaitan, “Tapok at Banlik”
- Second Prize: Ferdinand Pisigan Jarin, “Anim Na Sabado Ng Beyblade”
- Third Prize: Eugene Evasco, “Segunda Mano”

=== Dulang May Isang Yugto ===
- First Prize: No Winner
- Second Prize: Joseph Patrick V. Arevalo, “Sa Loob ng Kawayan”
- Third Prize: Vincent A. De Jesus, “Ateng...”

=== Dulang Ganap ang Haba ===
- First Prize: Reuel M. Aguila, “Baligho”
- Second Prize: Edward P. Perez Jr., “Si Marya at Si Kiling”
- Third Prize: Rodolfo Vera, “Masa”

=== Dulang Pantelebisyon ===
- First Prize: Manuel R. Buising, “Niños Inocentes”
- Second Prize: Elmer L. Gatchalian, “Pasalubong”
- Third Prize: Ma. Clarissa N. Estuar, “Bayad Utang”

=== Dulang Pampelikula ===
- First Prize: Erlito G. Reyes, “Hubog Ng Langit”
- Second Prize: Veronica B. Velasco, “Boy”
- Third Prize: Allan Tijamo, “Blue Moon”

== Regional Division ==
=== Short Story [Cebuano] ===
- First Prize: Macario D. Tiu, "Balyan"
- Second Prize: Agustin Pagusara Jr., "Bangka sa Kinabuhi"
- Third Prize: Josua S. Cabrera, "Sesyon"

=== Short Story [Hiligaynon] ===
- First Prize: Genevieve L. Asenjo, "Turagsoy"
- Second Prize: Christian F. Emague, "Kaupod"
- Third prize: Lester Mark P. Carnaje, "Daguob Sang Dagat"

=== Short Story [Iluko] ===
- First Prize: Danilo B. Antalan, "Goyo: Ti Dangadang iti Rabaw ti Ulep"
- Second Prize: Joel B. Manuel, "Ti Galienera, Ti Ili, ken Tallo A Kronika"
- Third Prize: Daniel L. Nesperos, "Dagiti Dir-i ken Tagay iti Daradara a Bangabanga"

== Kabataan Division ==
=== Kabataan Essay ===
- First Prize: Patricia Marie I. Ranada, "Stories"
- Second Prize: Joan Paula A. Deveraturda, "As Silly As It Gets"
- Third prize: Katrina G. Gomez, "Learning To Be Filipino"

=== Kabataan Sanaysay ===
- First Prize: Kristina D.C. Javier, "Wahahahahahahahaha"
- Second Prize: Jamaica Jane J. Pascual, "Alaala ng Quiapo"
- Third Prize: Arnold Pantaleon Pascua II, "K"

== Sources ==
- "The Don Carlos Palanca Memorial Awards for Literature | Winners 2005". Archived from the original on 2009-10-27.
