= 2004 Palanca Awards =

Philippine literary award

54th Palanca Awards
- Date: September 1, 2004
- Location: The Peninsula Manila, Makati, Philippines

The 54th Don Carlos Palanca Memorial Awards for Literature was held on September 1, 2004, at The Peninsula Manila in Makati to commemorate the memory of Don Carlos Palanca Sr. through an endeavor that would promote education and culture in the country.

Isagani R. Cruz was this year's Palanca Hall of Fame awardee. Cruz clinched his fifth first prize for “The Lovely Bienvenido N. Santos” under the Full-Length Play category. The said award is given to writers who have won five first places in any category.

LIST OF WINNERS

The 2004 winners are divided into four categories:

== English Division ==
=== Short Story ===
- First Prize: Asterio Enrico Gutierrez, "Blind"
- Second Prize: Socorro Villanueva, "Foggy Makes Me Sad"
- Third Prize: Paul de Guzman, "The Index of Forbidden Books"

=== Future Fiction ===
- First Prize: Irene Carolina Sarmiento, "They Don't Bite"
- Second Prize: Catherine Rose Torres, "Niche"
- Third Prize: Dean Francis Alfar, "Hollow Girl: A Romance"

=== Short Story for Children ===
- First Prize: Victoria Estrella Bravo, "The Cat Painter"
- Second Prize: Maria Celeste Flores, "Touch Ball"
- Third Prize: C. Horatius Mosquera, "The Boy Who Had Three Brains"

=== Poetry ===
- First Prize: Naya Valdellon, "Casual Ties"
- Second {rize: Joel Toledo, "Literature and Other Poems"
- Third Prize: Angelo Suarez, "Else It Was Purely Girls"

=== Essay ===
- First Prize: Wilfredo Pascual Jr., "Devotion"
- Second Prize: Erwin Romulo, "Confessions of a Space Boy"
- Third Prize: Jose Maria Alarilla, "Surviving the Zeroes"

=== One-Act play ===
- First Prize: Glenn Sevilla Mas, "Her Father's House"
- Second Prize: Dean Francis Alfar, "The Kite of Stars"
- Third Prize: Robert Arlo de Guzman, "Sakura"

=== Full-Length Play ===
- First Prize: Isagani R. Cruz, "The Lovely Bienvenido N. Santos"
- Second Prize: Anna Felicia Sanchez, "In Search of a Storybook Dragon"
- Third Prize: Glenn Sevilla Mas, "Rite of Passage"

== Filipino Division ==
=== Maikiling Kwento ===
- First Prize: Honorio Bartolome De Dios, "Etong Bayad, Sang Kalayaan Lang"
- Second Prize: Clarito Garcia de Francia, "Mik-Eng"
- Third Prize: Johannes Chua, "Dinuguan"

=== Future Fiction [Filipino] ===
- First Prize: Charles Bryan Acosta, "Dalawang Butil ng Asukal at Bigas"
- Second Prize: No Winner
- Third Prize: No Winner

=== Maikling Kwentong Pambata ===
- First Prize: No Winner
- Second Prize: Eugene Evasco, "Si Mabait at Ang Mga Daliri ng Liwanag"
- Third Prize: Russell Roland Molina, "Tuwing Sabado"

=== Tula ===
- First Prize: Edgar Calabia Samar, "Tayong Lumalakad Nang Matulin"
- Second Prize: Joseph Rosmon Tuazon, "Puti ang Anino ng Minsang Narito"
- Third Prize: Renato Santos, "Sa Mall ng Mega-buhay-buhay"

=== Sanaysay ===
- First Prize: Luna Sicat Cleto, "Balanse"
- Second Prize: Mary Grace Mendoza, "Suson-susong Suso"
- Third Prize: Melecio Antonio Adviento III, "Diwa ng Manlalakbay"

=== Dulang May Isang Yugto ===
- First Prize: Nicolas Pichay, "Pangulo Naming Mahal"
- Second Prize: Rodolfo Vera, "Mga Aswang sa Panahon ng Digmaan"
- Third Prize: George de Jesus III, "Unang Ulang ng Mayo"

=== Dulang Ganap ang Haba ===
- First Prize: Nicolas Pichay, "Psychedelia Apocalypsis"
- Second Prize: Jeanne Lim, "Gulong"
- Third prize: Allan Lopez, "Anatomiya ng Pag-ibig"

=== Dulang Pantelebisyon ===
- First Prize: Lourd Ernest De Veyra and Homer Novicio, "Tugtog Tinapay"
- Second Prize: Ma. Clarissa Estuar, "Riles"
- Third Prize: Ramon Orbeta, "Adik sa TV"

=== Dulang Pampelikula ===
- First Prize: Mark Meily, "Good Friday Archipelago"
- Second Prize: Ma. Abigael Malonzo, "Snapshots"
- Third Prize: Jose Maria Manalo, "Adoboville"

== Regional Division ==
=== Short Story [Cebuano] ===
- First Prize: Arnel Mardoquio, "Ang Katapusang Sonata sa Clarinet ni Nikolet"
- Second Prize: Agustin Pagusara Jr., "Talia Migrante"
- Third Prize: Gumer Rafanan, "Gutom"

=== Short Story [Hiligaynon] ===
- First Prize: Winton Lou Ynion, "Sinipad sa Balaan Bukid"
- Second Prize: Genevieve L. Asenjo, "Si Beryong Balikbayan"
- Third Prize: John Iremil Teodoro, "Balaan"

=== Short Story [Iluko] ===
- First Prize: Prescillano Bermudez, "Apong Gabriel, Pundador"
- Second Prize: Daniel Nesperos, "Opas"
- Third Prize: Severino Pablo, "Silaw a Makidinnaeg iti Di Maungpot nga Isisingising ti Init"

== Kabataan Division ==
=== Kabataan Essay ===
- First Prize: Charles Bryan Acosta, "My Philosophy"
- Second Prize: Marc Gregory Yu, "To Be President? Why Not"
- Third Prize: Marie Kristine Reyes, "In Over-anticipation of the Future"

=== Kabataan Sanaysay ===
- First {rize: Marylaine Louise Viernes, "Iboto! Ako Para Pangulo"
- Second Prize: Cassandra Czarina Yap, "Kung Ako ay Presidente ng Pilipinas"
- Third Prize: Mark Christopher delos Angeles Deatras, "Kapitan"

== Sources ==
http://www.geocities.com/palanca_awards/2004.html( 2009-10-23)
