= José Wendell Capili =

Filipino academic and writer

- Born: Manila, Philippines
- Education: University of Santo Tomas (AB); University of the Philippines Diliman (MA); University of Cambridge (MPhil); Australian National University (PhD)
- Occupations: Professor, poet, author
- Writing career
- Pen name: José Wendell Capili

José Wendell Capili is a Filipino academic and writer. He earned degrees from the University of Santo Tomas, University of the Philippines Diliman, University of Cambridge and Australian National University. He is a professor of creative writing and comparative literature at the College of Arts and Letters, University of the Philippines. His creative and scholarly works were published in Asia, Europe, North America and Australia.

== Background and writing career ==
Al Camus Palomar of the University of Oklahoma says that "Edith L. Tiempo, Rene Amper, Peter Bacho, Jose Capili, Maria Cariño, and the incomparable Fatima Lim-Wilson are included to remind us all of what reading good poetry, feels like. And read Luis Cabalquinto, Jose Capili, and Ricardo de Ungria carefully. You will be immensely rewarded if you do". A.R.D.S. Bordado said that Capili's “The Great Australian Landscape” and “Gorilla Bay” show the Filipino sensibility imbibing foreign geography. The latter poem describes the beauty of the bay: “Gastropods on a drift/ conceive enclosures of/ bubbles shimmering forth,/ polished and white among/ rocks, splashing as spring/ time turns supremely aqua/ marine, even less torrential.” Of "Baguio: The Demise", critic Ralph Semino Galan writes how Capili utilizes the aftermath of another disaster, the gutted down remains of the Pines Hotel that burned down in 1984, as one of the objective correlatives (“the turn and flow of stones/ we perceived from childhood/ as walls, doors and ceilings/”) to express the emotional vacuity the personae in his elegiac poem are experiencing years after their major romantic breakup. For Galan, Capili is able to obfuscate the obvious intensity of the emotions that are being stirred by the reunion, for he makes the ex-lovers focus on the physical landscape, rather than the inner turmoil they are feeling in each other's formerly familiar presence: “the rustle of leaves/ behaving like music,” “the landscape of cones/ falling on mountain sleeves,” “pure hemp and other bell-shaped/ things awakening from/ a sudden gush of the wind”. Of A Madness of Birds (1998), Capili's first book, critic Tito Quiling Jr. writes, "Splattered across its pages are colors such as ceruleans to auburns, and images of falling leaves, cascading water, and stout temple pillars. And spinning in between these are individual’s memories attached to nature’s multifaceted character—from seeing migratory birds returning to their proverbial places to moments illustrating one’s love for his hometown are some of the pieces found in this collection of poems..."

== Research career ==
Capili interviewed National Artist Napoleón Abueva, the "Father of Modern Philippine Sculpture". Abueva revealed his personal aesthetics, especially in connection with World War II. Says Abueva: "We sought the remains of our parents from a field of corpses and items belonging to the members of the resistance group. It was painful for me and my siblings to unearth the soiled white shirt with blue stripes, which belonged to my father. We also found a piece of my mother’s dress as well as her rosary. Later, we found my parents’ bodies and we buried them. It was very painful. As an artist, these experiences taught me to see life in a different way. More specifically, I tried my best to look for new ways of expressing ideas as a way of dealing with the pain".

Capili worked on a research project involving Southeast Asian diaspora writers in Australia at the Research School of Pacific and Asian Studies, Australian National University. His stint as a visiting scholar at the National University of Singapore, University of Sydney, Westerly Centre of the University of Western Australia, University of Melbourne, and the University of Queensland brought about the publication of From the Editors: Migrant Communities and Emerging Australian Literature (2007) and Salu-Salo: In Conversation with Filipinos (2008). In "The Asian conspiracy: deploying voice/deploying story", Merlinda Bobis, winner of the Christina Stead Prize for Fiction in the 2016 New South Wales Premier's Literary Awards, writes, "Migrant story-making has clout if it contributes to the narrative of the nation. This framework is discussed by...Capili in his introduction to Salu-Salo...". But critic Michael Jacklin of the University of Wollongong, in The Transnational Turn in Australian Literary Studies, commented that while publications on Southeast Asian diaspora writers and every other cultural group that has settled in Australia could be provided for the transnational dimensions of Vietnamese-Australian, Lao-Australian or Philippine-Australian writing, such work frequently remains undocumented by literature infrastructure. "Literary cultures across Australia will not appreciate works by community-based Southeast Asian diaspora writers", Capili noted. As Jacklin observes, "Cheeseman and Capili’s book is yet to appear in Library Australia’s listings; it does appear in the Blacktown City Libraries catalogue". Similarly, AusLit, the Australian Literature Resource, cited Capili's 'Southeast Asian diaspora writers in Australia and the consequence of community-based initiatives', in which he notes the difficulty of finding an audience for community-based Southeast Asian writers in Australia.

In The Politics of Identity and Mimetic Constructions in the Philippine Transnational Experience, Sharon Orig noted that Capili's early work on displacement and reterritorialization in Philippine expatriate poetry in the United States (1993) "expounds on 'de-territorialization' as a 'displacement,' 'dislocation,' or simply a feeling of 'not being home'". Hope S. Yu, in "Memory, Nostalgia and the Filipino Diaspora in the Works of Two Filipina Writers", added that Capili attributes the migration of many Philippine migrant writers "mainly to the strong influence America has on its 'neo-colony' as well as the inability of the Philippine government to 'provide its citizens with the most basic material necessities: food, clothing, shelter." Capili's interest in migration studies is more evident in Immigrant themes in Japanese-American and Filipino-American poetry (1995) and The Relocalisation of Japanese Immigrants in Davao, Southern Philippines (1996). Arnold Molina Azurin, in The Japanese in our Midst: An Exploratory Analysis of the Experiences of Japanese Migrants/Settlers in the Philippines, and Shun Ohno (大野 俊), in Rethinking Okinawan Diasporas in 'Davaokuo (｢ダバオ国｣の沖縄人社会再考 －本土日本人、フィリピン人との関係を中心に－), noted how Capili described Japan as dura virum nutrix (a hard nurse of men) due to that country's open and shifting hierarchy. Ultimately, for Azurin, Capili suggests that wealth, not blood, was the greater recipient of position [of privilege], and wealth could be created by (war-making) skill or fraud. "It was a situation where money and contracts, not blood and status, ruled", Capili asserts. Azurin comments: "And then, with direct reference to the dire situation in the early 1900s among the common folk in Japan, he (Capili) suggests that 'Japanese emigrants decided to establish settlements in Davao because…[by his own sweat] a person can move up fairly quickly, certainly within a lifetime'".

Migrations and Mediations, Capili's doctoral dissertation on Southeast Asian writing in Australia, was published by the University of the Philippines Press in 2016. According to Philippine National Artist for Literature Bienvenido Lumbera, the book is “… remarkable for its steady grasp of a unifying vision encompassing literary production by writers coming from disparate cultures and historical backgrounds, and establishing their significance as a factor in the construction of the contemporary cultural identity of Australia … an important contribution to the narrative of Australia’s cultural history …”. For critic Danilo Francisco M. Reyes, the alternative cultural history that Capili proposes would not have been possible if not for his patience in upholding the methodology of oral history". Says University of Western Australia Professor Michael Pinches, Migrations and Mediations is “… important and timely: on one hand, identifying and documenting the various factors that have limited, shaped and facilitated the development of Southeast Asian Diaspora writers in Australia; on the other, demonstrating the significant contribution these writers have made to the advancement of multiculturalism in Australia…Capili’s main contribution to the field lies in the way he distinguishes and documents the various programs, institutions, mentors, awards, and communities that have contributed to the growth of Southeast Asian diasporic writing in Australia …”.

During a collaborative session between the Southeast Asia/Southeast Asia Diasporic Forum of the Modern Language Association (MLA) and the American Association for Australasian Literary Studies (AAALS) at the January 2020 MLA conference in Seattle, critic Weihsin Gui noted that although there are many studies and anthologies in the social sciences regarding Southeast Asia and Australia, with one exception there has not been a recent substantive study of literary and cultural productions that arise because of such connections. Frequently discussed are works by authors of East Asian and South Asian descent, although there is some attention given to writing by a few authors of Southeast Asian ancestry. Gui and Cheryl Narumi Naruse took their lead for this collaborative session from Capili's book, which "makes an important contribution to knowledge about Asian Australian culture and literature, an area that has seen exciting growth and critical debate over the past two decades.

== Commentator of popular culture ==
In Originality in the Postcolony: Choreographing the Neoethnic Body of Philippine Ballet, critic Sally A. Ness of the University of California, Riverside noted how Capili identified National Artist for Dance Agnes Locsin's neoethnic choreographies as a prestigious and technically effective site for what Locsin calls "Filipinization", and on more than one level "the state of the art" in an internationally oriented project of cultural nationalism. Says Ness: "Capili recognized this function of Locsin's work, when Ms. Locsin's neoethnic ballet Babalyan was awarded the prestigious Prince Norihito Takamado Award from Japan's Imperial Family in 1994. 'Once and for all', Capili wrote, in a feature article published in the Philippine Daily Inquirer, 'Locsin asserted the fact that we are not a nation of domestics and prostitutes'.

Spanish novelist and screenwriter Ignacio Martínez de Pisón's La Filipinas de Amparo Muñoz (The Philippines of Amparo Muñoz, 2011), published in El País, referred to Capili's third book, Mabuhay to Beauty (2003), as a starting point to help explain the iconic nature of beauty pageants and luminaries like Miss Universe 1974 Amparo Muñoz in the Philippines.

== Books ==
=== Poetry ===
A Madness of Birds, (Quezon City: University of the Philippines Press, 1998)

=== Essays ===
Bloom and Memory, (Manila: University of Santo Tomas Publishing House, 2002)

Bridging Leadership by Example (with Timothy James Dimacali and Manuel de Vera), (Makati: Asian Institute of Management, 2025)

=== Popular culture ===
(as editor) Mabuhay to Beauty!, (Quezon City: Milflores Publishing, 2003)

=== Anthology ===
(as editor) From the Editors: Migrant Communities and Emerging Australian Literature, (Liverpool, New South Wales, Australia: Casula Powerhouse, 2007)

(as co-editor, with John Cheeseman) Salu-Salo: In Conversation with Filipinos, (Blacktown and Liverpool, New South Wales, Australia: Blacktown Arts Centre and Casula Powerhouse, 2008)

=== Translation ===
(translated and edited with John Jack Wigley) Lupito and the Circus Village (translation of Si Lupito at ang Barrio Sirkero written by Rowald Almazar, artworks by Jose Santos III), (Manila: University of Santo Tomas Publishing House, 2008)

=== Literary History and Criticism ===
Migrations and Mediations: The Emergence of Southeast Asian Diaspora Writers in Australia, 1972-2007, (Quezon City: University of the Philippines Press, 2016)
