= 1991 Palanca Awards =

Philippine literary award

41st Palanca Awards

The 41st Don Carlos Palanca Memorial Awards for Literature was held to commemorate the memory of Don Carlos Palanca Sr. through an endeavor that would promote education and culture in the country.

LIST OF WINNERS

The 1991 winners were divided into thirteen categories, open only to English and Filipino [Tagalog] short story, short story for children, poetry, essay, one-act play, and full-length play, plus the Dulang Pantelebisyon, open only for the Filipino Division:

== English Division ==
=== Short Story ===
- First Prize: Jessica Zafra, “Portents”
- Second Prize: Alfred A. Yuson, “The Music Child”
- Third Prize: Ma. Luisa A. Igloria, “All Possible Pasts and Future”

=== Short Story for Children ===
- First Prize: Ma. Elena Paterno-Locsin, “The Blanket”
- Second Prize: Edgardo B. Maranan, “The Jink, the Dolphin, and the Deep Sea Mystery”

Ma. Elena Paterno-Locsin, “Francisco”

- Third Prize: Ramon Sunico, “Blue, Red, Yello”

Edgardo B. Maranan, “The Fifth Element”
Ametta Suarez-Taguchi, “Tito Jose's Legacy”

=== Poetry ===
- First Prize: Arnold Molina Azurin, “Dogodog and Other Poems Bypassed by the Northerlies”
- Second Prize: Merlie Alunan, “Poems of a Season”
- Third Prize: Ma. Fatima V. Lim, “From the Hothouse”

Franklin Cimatu, “Living in the Movies”

=== Essay ===
- First Prize: Arnold Molina Azurin, “Unravelling the Knots of Ethnicity”
- Second Prize: Jose Y. Dalisay Jr., “Killing Time in Little Earth”
- Third Prize: Anthony L. Tan, “Intimations of Mortality”

=== One-Act Play ===
- First Prize: No Winner
- Second Prize: Jessie B. Garcia, “A Footnote to History”

Dean Francis Alfar, “Short Time”
Felix A. Clemente, “The Nuptial Initiation”

- Third Prize: No Winner

=== Full-Length Play ===
- First Prize: No Winner
- Second Prize: No Winner
- Third Prize: No Winner

== Filipino Division ==
=== Maikling Kwento ===
- Honorable Mention: Lav Indico Diaz, “Ang Pinagdaanang Buhay ni Nano”

Fernando Villarca Cao, “Isang Hindi Malilimutang Tanghali sa Buhay ng mga Ginoo at Ginang ng Bitukang Manok”
Reynaldo A. Duque, “Marino”
Pat V. Villafuerte, “Si Ato sa Sangmagdamagang Pagtatakas sa Kawalang Malay”
Lorenzo Tabin, “Tatlong Bakas ng Paa”

=== Maikling Kwentong Pambata ===
- First Prize: Natasha Vizcarra, “Ang Pintor ni Garu”
- Second Prize: Edgardo B. Maranan, “Ang Ambahan ni Ambo”
- Third Prize: Reynaldo A. Duque, “Salidum-Ay”

=== Tula ===
- First Prize: Franklin Cimatu, “Desparacido/Desaparadico”
- Second Prize: JJ Alvarez Dela Rosa, “Hari ang Ari”

Roberto Ofanda Umil, “Mga Tula sa Pagpapalit ng Tadhana”

- Third Prize: No Winner
- Honorable Mention: Michael M. Coroza, “Putol”

=== Sanaysay ===
- First Prize: Glecy C. Atienza, “Ang Pagdadalaga ng mga Batang Taludtod”
- Second Prize: Roland Tolentino, “Ang Mito ng Pagkalalaki ni Richard Gomez”
- Third Prize: Omer Oscar Almenario, “Talaarawan ng Isang Galang Peryodista”

=== Dulang May Isang Yugto ===
- First Prize: No Winner
- Second Prize: Ramon C. Jocson, “Sa Pusod ng Yungib”
- Third Prize: Reuel Molina Aguila, “Open 25-hours a Day”
- Honorable Mention: Rodolfo R. Lana Jr., “Eksodo”

Jose Bernard Capino, “Hindi Tungkol sa Mga Bayani”

=== Dulang Ganap ang Haba ===
- First Prize: Wilfred S. Victoria, “Baclaran”
- Second Prize: Manuel R. Buising, “Kung Paano Balatan ang Talop na Bunga”
- Third Prize: Carlos Dela Paz Jr., “Poon”

=== Dulang Pantelebisyon ===
- First Honorable Mention: Ronald S. Marcelo, “Kapanahon”

Segundo D. Matias Jr., "Loida: Taxi Driver"

- Second Honorable Mention: Diosdado Anzures Jr., “Ang Halamanan sa Paso”

Melchor Salandanan Ventura, “Isang Bukas Para Kay Junjun”

- Third Honorable Mention: Rolando S. Salvana, “Jayvee's Brother”

== Sources ==
- "The Don Carlos Palanca Memorial Awards for Literature | Winners 1991". Archived from the original on 2009-10-21.
