= Timothy James Dimacali =

Filipino science fiction writer and journalist (born 1980)

- Born: Timothy James Martinez Dimacali; April 17, 1980 (age 46)
- Education: University of the Philippines Diliman (AB); Massachusetts Institute of Technology (MS)
- Occupations: Journalist, Science Fiction Writer

Timothy James "TJ" Martinez Dimacali, (born April 17, 1980) is a Filipino science fiction writer and a science journalist. He is the first Filipino and first Fulbright scholar to attend the Massachusetts Institute of Technology's Graduate Program in Science Writing. He is also a science education advocate.

As a journalist, Dimacali served as Science and Technology Editor for GMA News and Public Affairs’s online portal GMA News Online, which earned him recognition from the Philippines' Department of Science and Technology, which named him one of the awardees of the Gawad Scriba Award for Science Communicators in 2013. He left the post after receiving a Fulbright scholarship to MIT in 2017.

As a science fictionist, Dimacali is known for his science fiction work that incorporates Philippine myths and history. He is an alumnus of several local and international writers' workshops, including the Iligan National Writers' Workshop, the Silliman University Writers' Workshop, and the Clarion Science Fiction and Fantasy Writers' Workshop.

== Career ==
=== Literary writing ===
In 2009 he was chosen to be a Fellow for English Fiction at the Iligan National Writers' Workshop, held at Mindanao State University – Iligan Institute of Technology in Iligan City.

In 2010 he also contributed the story "Keeper of My Sky" to Volume 5 of Philippine Speculative Fiction, which by then was being edited by Nikki Alfar and Vincent Simbulan. In 2014, the same story was optioned Paolo Chikiamco's Mythology-oriented anthology "Alternative Alamat: Stories Inspired by Philippine Mythology". In 2012, Dimacali was also selected as a Fellow for Fiction at the Silliman University National Writers Workshop, held at Silliman University in Dumaguete.

His work regularly graces the pages of anthologies such as Kestrel Publishing's Philippine Speculative Fiction series and Paolo Chikiamco's Alternative Alamat, as well as magazines such as Philippine Graphic and Summit Media's Kwentillion. His story “Sky Gypsies” has also been adapted into a comic book, with John Ray "JR" Bumanglag as artist, coming out in the pages of Kwentillion magazine. This comic book adaptation was reprinted in Volume 12, Issue 2 of The Journal of Transnational American Studies, published by the University of California, Santa Barbara, in 2021.

In 2019, Dimacali was chosen as a fellow to the Clarion Workshop, a six-week retreat for aspiring science fiction and fantasy writers hosted by the University of California - San Diego and supported by the Arthur C. Clarke Center for Human Imagination.

=== Academic writing ===
Dimacali has written extensively about indigenous Philippine science. His MIT master's thesis, titled, "From the Sea to the Stars: The Forgotten Journeys of the Philippines' Ancient Explorers," discussed the likelihood that anatomically modern humans had developed seafaring technology to reach the Philippine islands tens of thousands of years before other civilizations. In 2024, his paper, "The Better Angles of Our Nature: The Psychophysics of Balangay Construction and Navigation" discussed the possibility of inferring lost boatbuilding and seafaring knowledge by studying the construction details of extant artifacts.

Dimacali was also the chief editor of PAGTANAW 2050, a Philippines-focused Science, Technology, and Innovation (STI) Foresight and Strategic Plan, designed to guide the country towards a prosperous, archipelagic, and maritime nation by 2050. Published in 2021, the extensive document envisions harnessing Filipino talent and STI to drive innovation in products, processes, and organizations, ultimately leveraging the country's natural resources for sustainable development.

=== Science journalism ===
When GMA News and Public Affairs launched its online presence in the form of GMA News Online in 2009, Dimacali became the portal's online community manager. In 2010, GMA News Online created the post of Science and Technology Editor, and asked Dimacali to come on board. Under Dimacali, GMA News Online became noted for its coverage of basic science stories–in contrast to most Philippine news venues, whose science and technology coverage has thus far either tended to focus on consumer technology, or relegated to special sections that only get published occasionally.

In July 2013, the Philippine Department of Science and Technology (DOST) awarded Dimacali with a DOST Gawad Scriba Award for Science Communicators.

In 2025, he co-authored Bridging Leadership by Example, together with UP Diliman professor Jose Wendell Capili and Asian Institute of Management professor Manuel De Vera. The book is a retrospective of the history and achievements of the AIM TeaM Energy Center for Bridging Leadership.

=== Science education and consultancy work ===
In 2020, Dimacali was tapped as a communications consultant for the Philippine Department of Science and Technology (DOST), and the Philippine National Academy of Science and Technology (NAST), and the Probe Media Foundation.

As part of their response to the various quarantines arising from the Coronavirus disease 2019 pandemic in the Philippines, the Philippines' Department of Science and Technology tapped Dimacali as writer alongside Jeffrey Hidalgo as film director for their 20-minute "TuklaSiyensya sa Eskwela" Science education modules. These were designed to be used by both public and private schools who had to shift to teaching Science via distance mode while the COVID-19 crisis remained unresolved. Dimacali was also a regular contributor to Batobalani Magazine and Asian Scientist Magazine.

In 2023, Dimacali co-founded Science Communicators Philippines Inc., a nonstock, nonprofit organization composed of scientists, science journalists and broadcasters, and science communicators that aims to promote the relevance and practical use of science and technology in social and economic development as well as in Filipinos' daily lives. He served as the organization's first Vice President for External Affairs.

As of 2023, Dimacali was the head of the UP Diliman College of Science's Science Communication Team. In 2025, he was appointed Research Communications Head under the Office of the Assistant Vice President for Research, Creative Work, and Innovation of Ateneo de Manila University.

== Controversy ==
=== Iligan Workshop incident ===
In August 2019, a Twitter user named Angely Chi claimed that Dimacali had sexually assaulted a participant of the 2019 Iligan National Writer's Workshop, in which Dimacali was a guest speaker. Dimacali maintained his innocence through social media and through an affidavit he submitted to the Commission on Human Rights (CHR). The resulting legal case was dismissed with finality by Iligan City Assistant Prosecutor Shirly Parmisana-Bisnar in January 2020 as the alleged victim admitted to asking witnesses to leave the room while Dimacali was passed out on his back. This was corroborated and attested to by the eyewitnesses themselves in sworn affidavits submitted to the investigation. In January 2022, police arrested Angely Chi, charging her with cyber libel under the Cybercrime Prevention Act of 2012. On September 25, 2024, CHR Officer-in-Charge Atty. Rochelle Dagaraga-Bagas sent the organizers of the workshop a Notice of Final Resolution declaring the case against Dimacali "closed and terminated." In a public statement, workshop director Christine Godinez-Ortega welcomed the decision, saying, "This is a vindication from the lawful courts and the CHR. We rest easy now."

== See also ==
- GMA News and Public Affairs
- Howie Severino
