= 2003 Palanca Awards =

Philippine literary award

53rd Palanca Awards
- Date: September 1, 2003
- Location: The Peninsula Manila, Makati, Philippines

The 53rd Don Carlos Palanca Memorial Awards for Literature was held on September 1, 2003, at The Peninsula Manila in Makati to commemorate the memory of Don Carlos Palanca Sr. through an endeavor that would promote education and culture in the country. National Artist for Literature Virgilio S. Almario was Guest of Honor and Speaker at this year’s awarding ceremony.

Reynaldo A. Duque was this year's Palanca Hall of Fame awardee. Duque clinched his fifth first prize for “Apong Simon” under the Maikling Kwento category. The said award is given to writers who have won five first places in any category.

LIST OF WINNERS

The 2003 winners are divided into four categories:

== English Division ==
=== Short Story ===
- First Prize: Rosario Cruz Lucero, "Doreen's Story"
- Second Prize: Ian Rosales Casocot, "The Hero of the Snore Tango"
- Third Prize: Maria Francezca Theresa C. Kwe, "Closed Doors"

=== Future Fiction ===
- First Prize: No Winner
- Second Prize: No Winner
- Third Prize: Yvette Natalia Uy Tan, "Sidhi"

=== Short Story for Children ===
- First Prize: Honoel A. Ibardolaza, "The Greediest of Rajahs and the Whitest of Clouds"
- Second Prize: Cyan Abad-Jugo, "Behind The Old Aparador"
- Third Prize: Yvette Natalie Uy Tan, "Kulog"

=== Poetry ===
- First Prize: Isidoro Cruz, "Bodies Of Water"
- Second Prize: Angelo Suarez, "Exploratoria"
- Third Prize: Mike Maniquiz, "Tornadoes and Other Poems"

=== Essay ===
- First Prize: Rosario Cruz Lucero, "The Music Of Pestle-On-Mortar"
- Second Prize: Lourd Ernest de Veyra, "Videoke Blues"
- Third Prize: Xerxes Matza, "Licking Lollies: The Re-education of the Accidental American"

=== One-Act Play ===
- First Prize: No Winne
- Second Prize: Dean Francis Alfar, "The Onan Circle"
- Third Prize: Glenn Sevilla Mas, "The Birth Of Light"

=== Full-Length Play ===
- First Prize: No Winner
- Second Prize: Floy Quintos, "Fluid"
- Third Prize: Frank Rivera, "The Adventures of Pilandok"

== Filipino Division ==
=== Maikling Kwento ===
- First Prize: Reynaldo Duque, "Apong Simon"
- Second Prize: Alvin Yapan, "Bomba"
- Third Prize: Abdon Balde Jr., "Supay"

=== Future Fiction [Filipino] ===
- First Prize: Ricardo Fernando III, "Bagong Developments Sa Pagbuo Ng Mito Sa Lungsod"
- Second Prize: Edgar Calabia Samar, "Project: Eyod"
- Third Prize: Alvin Yapan, "Nostalgia"

=== Maikling Kwentong Pambata ===
- First Prize: Renato Vibiesca, "Tahooieyy!"
- Second Prize: Mae Astrid Tobias, "Bayong ng Kuting"
- Third Prize: Alice Mallari, "Hayan Na Si Lolo Sinto"

=== Tula ===
- First Prize: Alwynn C. Javier, "Ang Magneto sa Gitna ng Aking Daigdig"
- Second Prize: Raymund Magno Garlitos, "Nostos at Iba Pang Awit ng Pagtubos"
- Third Prize: Jing Castro Panganiban, "Ilang Pagsasanay sa Pangungulila"

=== Sanaysay ===
- First Prize: Niles Jordan Breis, "Kung Tawagin Sila’y Angela Buruka: Sa Alaala ni Angela Manalang-Gloria"
- Second Prize: Mjolnir Xoce Ong, "Adventures sa Kawatanan ng Rentas Internas"
- Third Prize: John Iremil Teodoro, "Maikling Talambuhay ng Isang Makatang Ipinaglihi sa Paa ng Manok at Sirena"

=== Dulang May Isang Yugto ===
- First Prize: Maria Kristine Chynna Roxas, "Traje De Boda"
- Second Prize: Christian Vallez, "Twenty Questions"
- Third Prize: Nathaniel Joseph de Mesa, "I Laugh You"

=== Dulang Ganap ang Haba ===
- First Prize: No Winner
- Second Prize: No Winner
- Third Prize: Mari Jina Endaya, "Trese: Isang Panayam"

=== Dulang Pantelebisyon ===
- First Prize: Lazaro Torres Jr., "Kasama Sa Bahay"
- Second Prize: Rolando Salvana, "Ang Buhay Kong Duling"
- Third Prize: Nita Eden So, "Ay Em Nene"

=== Dulang Pampelikula ===
- First Prize: Jose Maria Manalo, "Mangha"
- Second Prize: Rica Leticia Arevalo, "ICU Bed #7"
- Third Prize: Norman Wilwayco, "Kung Paano Kong Inayos ang Buhok Ko Matapos ang Mahaba-haba Ring Paglalakbay"

== Regional Division ==
=== Short Story [Cebuano] ===
- First Prize: Mario Batusa, "Pagbugto Sa Kataposang Higot"
- Second Prize: Lamberto Ceballos, "Tinggutom Sa Nayawak"
- Third Prize: Arnel Mardoquio, "Tikbalangkapre"

=== Short Story [Hiligaynon] ===
- First Prize: Alice Tan Gonzales, "Esperanza"
- Second Prize: Lester Mark Carnaje, "Haligi Nga Asin"
- Third Prize: Isabel Sebullen, "Mga Misteryo Sa Kagulangan"

=== Short Story [Iluko] ===
- First Prize: Reynaldo A. Duque, "Leon, 15"
- Second Prize: Ariel S. Tabag, "Sudario"
- Third Prize: Clarito de Francia, "No Tallikudan Dagiti Tugot"

== Kabataan Division ==
=== Kabataan Essay ===
- First Prize: Cristina Monica Buensalido, "Learning To Fly"
- Second Prize: Florianne Marie Jimenez, "Why I Am Who I Am"
- Third Prize: Enrico Miguel Subido, "Contemplating the Concept of Sanctuary"

=== Kabataan Sanaysay ===
- First Prize: No Winner
- Second Prize: No Winner
- Third Prize: No Winner

== Sources ==
- "The Don Carlos Palanca Memorial Awards for Literature | Winners 2003". Archived from the original on 2009-10-22.
