= 1993 Palanca Awards =

Philippine literary award

43rd Palanca Awards

The 43rd Don Carlos Palanca Memorial Awards for Literature was held to commemorate the memory of Don Carlos Palanca Sr. through an endeavor that would promote education and culture in the country.

LIST OF WINNERS

The 1993 winners were divided into fifteen categories, open only to English and Filipino [Tagalog] novel, short story, short story for children, poetry, essay, one-act play, and full-length play, plus the Dulang Pantelebisyon, open only for the Filipino Division:

== English Division ==
=== Novel ===
- Grand Prize: Jose Y. Dalisay Jr., Killing Time in a Warm Place

Antonio R. Enriquez, Subanons

=== Short Story ===
- First Prize: Jaime An Lim, “The Axolotl Colony”
- Second Prize: Myra L. Go, “Molde Perdido”
- Third Prize: Mig Alvarez Enriquez, “Blood on the Moon”

=== Short Story for Children ===
- First Prize: Leoncio P. Deriada, “The Man Who Hated Birds”
- Second Prize: Jaime An Lim, “The Boy and the Tree of Time”

Marivi Soliven, “The Pillow Cat”

- Third Prize: Victorino Manalo, “Little Bird, Little Fish and the Elephant”

Erlinda Acacio Flores, “The Bamboo Who Wanted to Become a Christmas Tree”

=== Poetry ===
- First Prize: Anthony L. Tan, “Poems for Muddas”
- Second Prize: Elsa M. Coscolluela, “In Time Passing and Other Poems”
- Third Prize: Marne Kilates, “Excerpt from the Unfinished Life”

=== Essay ===
- First Prize: Ma. Luisa A. Igloria, “Undoing Secrets”
- Second Prize: Victorino Manalo, “Listening to My Father”
- Third Prize: Jessica Zafra, “Bad Boy, Robin, Baad, Baad Boy”

=== One-Act Play ===
- First Prize: Corinna Esperanza A. Nuqui, “Paper Anniversary”
- Second Prize: Edelisa C. Cruz, “And There Was Light”
- Third Prize: Ruby Senatin, “A Jewel for Two”

=== Full-Length Play ===
- First Prize: Elsa M. Coscolluela, “The Comfort of Women”
- Second Prize: Anton Juan Jr., “Death in the Form of A Rose”
- Third Prize: Rolando S. Tinio, “Besame Mucho, Love Me Forever”

== Filipino Division ==
=== Nobela ===
- Grand Prize: Domingo G. Landicho, Bulaklak ng Maynila

Buenaventura S. Medina Jr., Moog

=== Maikling Kwento ===
- First Prize: Mayette Bayuga, “Rosal”
- Second Prize: Marco A.V. Lopez, “Kamusta na Bok?”
- Third Prize: Honorio Bartolome De Dios, “Lihim sa Tag-araw”

Froilan Sempio Medina, “Wala sa Sarili”

=== Maikling Kwentong Pambata ===
- First Prize: Rene O. Villanueva, “Kuwento ni Malinis”
- Second Prize: Augie D. Rivera Jr., “Si Burnay, ang Batang Palayok”
- Third Prize: Adora Balmes, “Ang Paglalakbay ni Butirik, ang Dyip na Masungit”

=== Tula ===
- First Prize: Roberto T. Añonuevo, “Pangunungkan at iba pang Saliksik”
- Second Prize: Nicolas B. Pichay, “Ang Lunes na Mahirap Bunuin”
- Third Prize: Fidel Rillo Jr., ”Ilang Pagtutuwid sa Paraan ng Pagtawid”

=== Sanaysay ===
- First Prize: Reuel Molina Aguila, “May Katulong sa Aking Sopas”
- Second Prize: Glecy C. Atienza, “Soledad: Ang Mga Babae sa Kanilang Pag-iisa”
- Third Prize: Cesar Aljama, “Paano ba Umuwi Sa Sariling Bayan”

=== Dulang May Isang Yugto ===
- First Prize: No Winner
- Second Prize: Ramon C. Jocson and Fernando Villarca Cao, “Kristo Tagala”
- Third Prize: Allan L. Palileo, “Madumi”

=== Dulang Ganap ang Haba ===
- First Prize: Lito Casaje, “Separasyon”
- Second Prize: Jose Y. Dalisay Jr., “Aninag, Anino”
- Third Prize: Jose Y. Dalisay Jr., “Ang Butihing Babae ng Timog”

Ramon C. Jocson, “Ang Ninoy ni Ninay”

=== Dulang Pantelebisyon ===
- First Prize: Rolando S. Tinio, “Ang Kuwento ni A”
- Second Prize: Rolando F. Santos, “Magnanakaw”
- Third Prize: Mes De Guzman, “Karatula”

== Sources ==
- "The Don Carlos Palanca Memorial Awards for Literature | Winners 1993". Archived from the original on 2009-10-22.
