= 1994 Palanca Awards =

Philippine literary award

44th Palanca Awards

The 44th Don Carlos Palanca Memorial Awards for Literature was held to commemorate the memory of Don Carlos Palanca Sr. through an endeavor that would promote education and culture in the country. This year saw the inclusion of a new category, Dulang Pampelikula [Screenplay], for the Filipino Division.

LIST OF WINNERS

The 1994 winners were divided into fourteen categories, open only to English and Filipino [Tagalog] short story, short story for children, poetry, essay, one-act play, and full-length play, plus the Dulang Pantelebisyon and Dulang Pampelikula, open only for the Filipino Division:

== English Division ==
=== Short Story ===
- First Prize: Katrina Tuvera, "The Flight"
- Second Prize: Ma. Romina Gonzales, "Sanded Soles"
- Third Prize: Jessica Zafra, "Black"

=== Short Story for Children ===
- First Prize: Muriel Macaraig, "What is Serendipity?"
- Second Prize: Ma. Carla Pacis, "The Dream Weavers"
- Third Prize: Marilen Cawad, "Veronica"

=== Poetry ===
- First Prize: Ma. Luisa A. Igloria, "Journey to Luna and Other Poems of Passage"

Clovis Nazareno, "The Link Immemorial"

- Second Prize: Ma. Luisa A. Igloria, "Enkanto"

Fidelito Cortes, "Every Day Things"

- Third Prize: Alma S. Anonas-Carpio, "Random Access Memories"

Leigh Reyes, "The Leavings of Family and Lovers"
Ruel S. De Vera, "The Most Careful of Stars"

=== Essay ===
- First Prize: Ma. Luisa A. Igloria, "Reclaiming Vanished Geographies and Identities"
- Second Prize: Marjorie Evasco, "The Ludic Pleasures of Eating Words"
- Third Prize: Roland Tolentino, "Bodies, Letters, Catalogues; Filipinas in Transnational Space"

J. Neil C. Garcia, "Orlando Nadres and the Politics of Homosexual Identity"

=== One-Act Play ===
- First Prize: Nicolas B. Pichay, "In the Works Department"
- Second Prize: Dean Francis Alfar, "Loving Toto"
- Third Prize: Bobby Flores Villasis, "Caves"

Corinna Esperanza A. Nuqui, "T.G.I.F."

=== Full-Length Play ===
- First Prize: No Winner
- Second Prize: Dean Francis Alfar, "Island"
- Third Prize: Rodolfo C. Vera, "Sky Legends"
- Honorable Mention: Al Claude Evangelio, "Broken Icons"

Edilberto K. Tiempo, "The Paraplegics"

== Filipino Division ==
=== Maikling Kwento ===
- First Prize: Jimmuel C. Naval, "Ang Pangangaluluwa"
- Second Prize: Eli Rueda Guieb III, "Pinsan"
- Third Prize: Levy Balgos Dela Cruz, "Mga Kagilagilalas na Kababalaghan sa Ilang"

=== Maikling Kwentong Pambata ===
- First Prize: Luis P. Gatmaitan, "Si Duglahi, Isang Patak ng Dugo"
- Second Prize: Simplicio Bisa, "Si Pinky, Si Tsinita, Si Rita Ritz at si Barbie"
- Third Prize: Rene O. Villanueva, "Dagat sa Kama ni Troy"

=== Tula ===
- First Prize: Roberto T. Añonuevo, "Kalatong at Iba pang Himig ng Paglalakbay"

Romulo P. Baquiran Jr., "Sa Kandungan ng Cordillera at iba pang Tula"

- Second Prize: German V. Gervacio, "Huling Hirit ni San Jose at Iba pang Tula"
- Third Prize: Benilda S. Santos, "Kay Tu Fu na Makauunawa sa Hindi Ko Babanggitin sa mga Taludtod na Ito"

Roberto Ofanda Umil, "Mga Tula sa Sandali ng Tunggali"

=== Sanaysay ===
- First Prize: Buenaventura S. Medina Jr., "Dalawang Alon sa Iisang Agos"
- Second Prize: Buenaventura S. Medina Jr., "Saling-Talinhaga: Pagsilang, Pagdayo, Pagbabalik"
- Third Prize: Nilo Ocampo, "Hunab Kurditan, Sugilanong Lubad Atbp"

=== Dulang May Isang Yugto ===
- First Prize: Elmer Gatchalian, "Ambon ng Kristal"
- Second Prize: Jose Bernard Capino, "Ang Dating Magkasintahan"

Rodolfo R. Lana Jr., "Buwan, Salawahang Buwan"

- Third Prize: Rene O. Villanueva, "Dobol"

Blaise Rogel Gacoscos, "Taguan sa Ulan"

=== Dulang Ganap ang Haba ===
- First Prize: Rene O. Villanueva, "Kalantiaw"
- Second Prize: Glecy C. Atienza, "Lutong Bahay"
- Third Prize: Rodolfo R. Lana Jr., "Mga Estranghero at Ang Gabi"

=== Dulang Pantelebisyon ===
- First Prize: Ella N. Madrigal, "Maulap ang Langit sa Kanluran"
- Second Prize: Levy Balgos Dela Cruz, "Sayaw ng Kamatayan"
- Third Prize: Fanny A. Garcia, "Hello... Paalam"

Evelyn Estrella-Sebastian, "Isang Araw sa Isang Bahay Ampunan"

=== Dulang Pampelikula ===
- First Prize: Rolando S. Tinio, "Kulay Luha ang Pag-ibig"
- Second Prize: Alfred Adlawan, "Ang Babae sa Burol"

Lito Casaje, "Ang Lalakeng Nangarap Maging Anghel Ngunit..."

- Third Prize: Elsa M. Coscolluela, "Bonsai"

Ramon Felipe Sarmiento, "Dayo"

== Sources ==
- "The Don Carlos Palanca Memorial Awards for Literature | Winners 1994". Archived from the original on 2009-10-22.
