= Albert Casuga =

Filipino-born Canadian writer

Albert B. Casuga, (born 1943) is a Filipino-born Canadian writer. He lives in Mississauga, Ontario, Canada, where he continues to write poetry, fiction, and criticism after his retirement from teaching. He served as an elected member of his region's school board.

He has won awards for his works in Canada, the U.S.A., and the Philippines. His latest work, A Theory of Echoes and Other Poems was published February 2009 by the University of Santo Tomas Publishing House. He has authored books of poetry, short stories, literary theory and criticism.

== Biography ==
Casuga was born in Baguio City, the Mountain Province during the Japanese occupation of the Philippines, and grew up in San Fernando, La Union, in the northern Philippines. He finished his elementary education in San Fernando Elementary School (Salutatorian), his secondary education at the La Union National High School (valedictorian, 1959). In high school, he served as editor-in-chief of the La Union TAB, the pioneer high school newspaper in the Philippines. He married his university classmate, Lourdes Veronica Casuga, with whom he had five children, and at this writing, a grandfather of nine.

A graduate (English & Literature, magna cum laude, 1963) of the Royal and Pontifical University of St. Thomas (now University of Santo Tomas, Manila), he taught English and Literature at the Philippines' De La Salle University and San Beda College. He was editor of the Journal of Arts and Sciences in UST (1961–62), Graduate School Journal of UST (1964), Literary Editor of the San Beda College Journal (1965-1968), and Assistant Literary Editor of the UST's Varsitarian (1962). He worked as a journalist with the United Press International (1963–65), and arts writer at the defunct Philippines Herald in the 70s. As a senior writer of the Philippine literary diaspora in Canada, he worked as writer and editor at the Metroland Publishing Company, publishers of Harlequin books and the country's largest daily The Toronto Star. He taught communications courses at the International School of Business (Canada) of which he was concurrent Communications director at its Mississauga campus (1990–98).

== Writing ==
Casuga was a 1972 Fellow at the Silliman Writer's Workshop in Silliman University, Dumaguete City, Philippines. He was the first winner of the Philippine Parnaso Poetry Contest in 1970 (now defunct). He won First Prizes in the Mississauga, Canada Library Systems Literary Contests in 1990 (for Fiction), 1996 (for Poetry), and 1998 (for Poetry). He was nominated to the Mississauga Arts Council Literary Awards in 2007.

His works were published in the Philippines Free Press, Graphic Weekly Magazine, NOW Philippines, The Sunday Times Magazine, Asia-Philippines Leader, Poetry Magazine (Maryland), Amihan (UST), De La Salle Philosophy Journal, San Beda College Journal., Philippine Writing, and poetry anthologies. His literary criticism was cited by Dr. Isagani R. Cruz in his Beyond Futility (The Filipino as a Critic, 1984, New Day Publishers, Quezon city, Philippines) as one of the more significant literary criticism of Philippine Literature in English.

== Books ==
Casuga's books include:

- Summer Suns (short story collection with Cirilo Bautista), UST Press, 1962, Manila
- Narra Poems and Others (poetry collection) San Beda college Publications, 1968, Manila
- Still Points (poetry collection) Flores & Associates, 1970, Manila
- In A Sparrow's Time (poetry collection) Infocom, 1990, Canada
- Songs for My Children (poetry collection) Infocom, 1996, Canada
- The Aesthetics of Literature (Literary Theory and Criticism), Asia Foundation & De La Salle University, 1972, Manila
- Man in Search of Meaning: Literature (Humanities Series), Asia Foundation and De La Salle University, Manila
- Man and His Literary Past: The Classical Tradition (Humanities Series), Asia Foundation and De La Salle University, Manila
- A Theory of Echoes and Other Poems (UST Publishing House, Manila, 2009)

In addition, his poems have been included in

- A Habit of Shores: Philippine English Poetry 1960s (UP Press, ed. Gemino H. Abad)
- Introduction to Literature (Fiction Poetry Drama) Revised Edition by Edilberto K. Tiempo, Miguel A. Bernad, Edith L. Tiempo
