= National Book Development Board =

Filipino government education agency

- Pambansang Lupon sa Pagpapaunlad ng Aklat
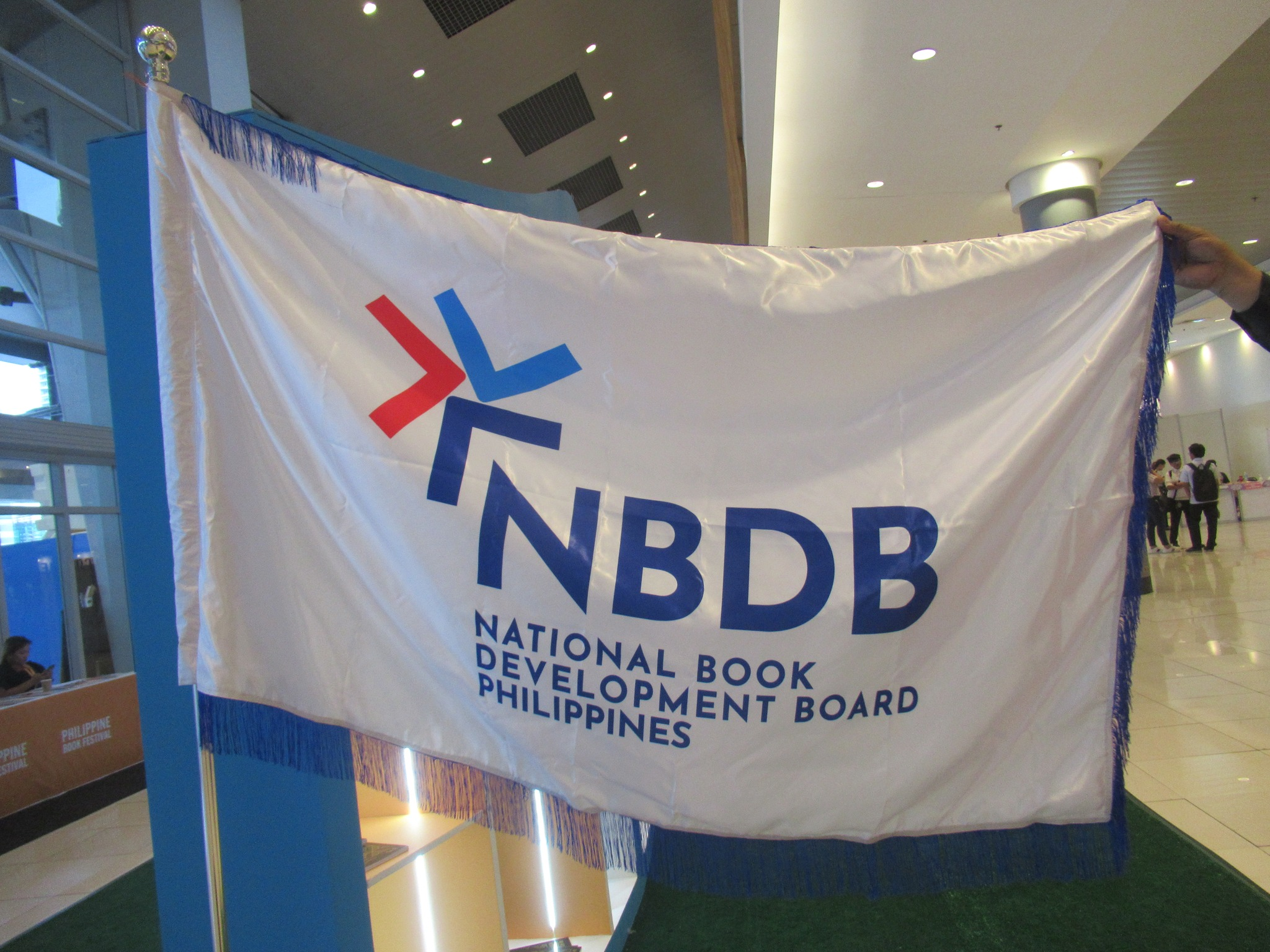
- Flag of the National Book Development Board

Agency overview
- Formed: August 14, 1995
- Jurisdiction: Philippines
- Headquarters: 21st Floor, The Upper Class Tower, Quezon Avenue corner Scout Reyes, Barangay Paligsahan, Quezon City
- Agency executives: Fatima Lipp D. Panontongan, Acting chair and concurrent vice-chair; Charisse Aquino-Tugade, Executive Director III
- Parent department: Department of Education
- Website: books.gov.ph

The National Book Development Board (NBDB; Filipino: Pambansang Lupon sa Pagpapaunlad ng Aklat) is an attached agency of the Department of Education that develops and promotes the Philippine book publishing industry. It was established through Republic Act No. 8047, also known as the "Book Publishing Industry Development Act." As the country's book authority, the NBDB leads the formulation and implementation of policies to support the growth of the book publishing industry.

Its operational plans include capacity-building initiatives, investment and trade promotion activities, grants and incentives, readership development campaigns, and industry research and data gathering.

== History ==
The NBDB was established following over a decade of legislative efforts to strengthen the book publishing industry by promoting equitable access to educational materials and eliminating tariffs and taxes. The initiative began with public hearings on July 25, 1994, and culminated in the enactment of Republic Act No. 8047, signed by President Fidel V. Ramos on June 7, 1995. This legislation, consolidating Senate Bill No. 252, authored by Senator Edgardo J. Angara, and House Bill No. 12614, aimed to position the book publishing industry as a key element in education and national development. The Act repealed Executive Order 492 of 1991, which had established the Instructional Materials Development Center under the Department of Education, Culture, and Sports (DECS).

== Mandate and functions ==
The NBDB is mandated by R.A. 8047 to:

1. Promote the growth and development of the Philippine book publishing industry;
2. Formulate and implement a National Book Policy and a corresponding National Book Development Plan;
3. Encourage the publication and distribution of books, most especially the Filipino-authored ones, with emphasis on writing focused on science and technology, education, arts, culture, and literature;
4. Ensure the availability of affordable, quality books for all sectors of society;
5. Support authorship and readership initiatives through grants, subsidies, training programs, and awards.

== Organizational structure ==
The NBDB is governed by a Governing Board composed of representatives from the government and the private book industry sectors. The agency is led by its Chairperson, assisted by a Secretariat through an Executive Director, who is designated by the NBDB Governing Board.

Charisse Aquino-Tugade is the Executive Director of the NBDB of the Philippines. Under her leadership, the NBDB has implemented changes to its operations and worked to increase the inclusion of Philippine-published books in government textbook programs.

== Programs and initiatives ==
The NBDB co-organizes the National Book Awards with the Manila Critics Circle, the National Children's Book Awards (with the Philippine Board on Books for Young People), and the Filipino Readers’ Choice Awards.

A number of grants and subsidies including The National Book Development Trust Fund, Publication Grants, the NBDB Translation Subsidy Program, and the Creative Nation Grant are also available from the organisation.

=== Readership Programs ===
The Book Nook Project, initiated in 2021, establishes reading centers in underserved areas of the Philippines. These centers provide access to books published in the Philippines and serve as spaces for reading and storytelling activities. Staff at Book Nook sites are trained in library management, storytelling, and community outreach to facilitate literacy programs. The NBDB also organizes an annual conference for site partners to share best practices. As of 2023, the project has 113 sites. The NBDB has partnered with organizations, including the National Museum of the Philippines, to establish sites such as one in Iloilo, which hosts a monthly reading program for students, and mobile reading centers have also been introduced to deliver books to schools. International sites have been established in South Korea and the United States.

The Philippine Book Festival (PBF), an annual event organized by the NBDB, showcases books published in the Philippines alongside educational and cultural events. The PBF includes activities such as book signings, author readings, literary performances, and panel discussions.

The NBDB also organises the National Alliance of Reading Advocates (NARA) in partnership with USAID, Booklatan sa Bayan, the Children's Book Summit, and the Philippine International Literary Festival.

== See also ==
- Literacy in the Philippines
- Philippine Literature
