= Allan Lopez =

Allan B. Lopez is a writer from the Philippines. He graduated from the University of the Philippines in Diliman, with a BA in Speech Communication. A fellow for drama in the 38th and the 45th UP National Writers Workshop, Lopez has won a number of awards for his dramatic work, and his plays have been staged in various venues and laboratory festivals (Cultural Center of the Philippines, UP, DLSU, CSB, UST, among others).

He is an active member of the playwrights group The Writersbloc, Inc.

His fiction, non-fiction and poetry in both English and Filipino have been published in local newspapers and magazines like The Philippine Star, The Philippine Graphic and Liwayway Magazine.

His play “Anatomiya ng Pag-Ibig” appears in the anthology Ang Aklat Likhaan ng Dula 1997-2003 edited by Rene Villanueva & Victor Emmanuel Carmelo Nadera, Jr. A personal anthology of his works for the stage is forthcoming.
