= Liza Magtoto =

Filipino playwright, scriptwriter, feature writer and editor

Liza Magtoto is a Filipino playwright, scriptwriter, feature writer and editor best known for the plays "Game of Trolls," "Care Divas," and "Rak of Aegis." She has also won the Don Carlos Palanca Memorial Awards for Literature several times, for her plays “Despedida de Soltera”, “Agnoia”, “Nay Isa”, “Paigan”, and “Rated PG.” Her work has also featured prominently several times at the Virgin Labfest of the Cultural Center of the Philippines, and at the Cinemalaya Independent Film Festival.
