= National Book Awards (Philippines) =

Philippine literary award

The Philippine National Book Awards, or simply the National Book Awards, is a Philippine literary award sponsored by and the Manila Critics' Circle (MCC) and the National Book Development Board (NBDB).

Every year since 1982, the Manila Critics Circle has been giving the National Book Awards to the best books written, designed, and published in the Philippines. Early in 2008, the Manila Critics Circle entered into an agreement with the National Book Development Board (Philippines) to institutionalize and co-administer the National Book Awards to better honor Philippine publishers, authors, and book designers.

The NBDB's participation in the conduct of the National Book Awards is in line with its mandate to support local authorship and promote the development of quality books, in accordance with RA 8047 or the Book Publishing Industry Development Act. Both the NBDB and the MCC envision to give a yearly tribute and will continue to recognize the creative works of talented authors and publishers to produce quality books for many years to come.

== History ==
The Manila Critics Circle was founded in 1981 when Ophelia Alcantara Dimalanta, Alfredo Navarro Salanga, Alfred A. Yuson, and Isagani R. Cruz realized that Philippine books were not getting the attention they deserved. What to Cruz "seemed like a quixotic venture at that time" was featured in the Asiaweek Literary Review.

That magazine article carried this lede: "Considering the Philippines' relatively high literacy rate, it is ironic that reading is not a favourite pastime among Filipinos. A quartet of dedicated Manila littérateurs believes it's high time something was done to dispel this literary lassitude."

Over the last four decades, this intrepid group of critics grew to include Leonides V. Benesa, Arlene Babst-Vokey, National Artist for Literature Virgilio S. Almario, Alice Guillermo, Doreen G. Fernandez, National Artist for Literature Resil B. Mojares, Roger Bresnahan, Miguel A. Bernad, SJ, Juaniyo Arcellana, National Artist for Literature Cirilo F. Bautista, Soledad S. Reyes, Joel Pablo Salud, Danton Remoto, and Ruel de Vera.

The present set of MCC members are Shirley O. Lua, Dean Francis Alfar, Alma Anonas-Carpio, Michael Coroza, and Tony La Viña. Jenny Ortuoste, who passed on last July 21, 2024, continued to participate in the 42nd cycle of nominee selection for the National Book Awards until her health no longer allowed her to join the meetings and deliberations.

The National Book Awards has had several sponsors who helped defray the huge expenses holding such awards has entailed: several corporations, agencies, and schools such as Artlab, the Ateneo de Manila University, Ayala Museum, Benguet Corp., Betty's Sans-Rival & Catering Service, Coca-Cola Bottlers Phils., the Cultural Center of the Philippines, De La Salle University, Equitable Philippine Commercial International Bank, Far Eastern University, Filipinas Foundation, Filipino Bookstore, Fortune Tobacco Corporation, Ganesh Art Center, Heritage Art Gallery, Jollibee Foods Corporation, La Tondeña, Land Bank of the Philippines, Magnolia Corporation, Manila Electric Company, Mobil Philippines, Nestlé Philippines, Paper Industries Corporation of the Philippines, Philippine Amusement and Gaming Corporation, Philippine Long Distance Telephone Company, Philippine Studies Association, Primetrade Asia, San Miguel Corporation, SGV & Company, University of Santo Tomas, and the University of the Philippines Creative Writing Center, now known as the UP Likhaan center.

Government agencies have also provided support by letting us utilize their facilities. The National Museum of the Philippines (NMP, the National Commission for Culture and the Arts (NCCA), the administrator of the Manila Metropolitan Theater, and the Hyundai Hall in Areté, Ateneo de Manila University have served as venues for the awarding ceremonies of the National Book Awards.

Today, the NBDB covers the costs of mounting the National Book Awards. The NBDB also adds to the MCC's expertise by inviting other critics, organizations, and schools to participate in the process of judging which books are the best of the year.

The winners receive cash awards from various donors, as well as the NBDB, and these awards are given in those donors' names. For the 42nd cycle of the National Book Awards, we have the Gerardo P. Cabochan Prize (short fiction in Filipino), the National Artist Cirilo F. Bautista Prize (short fiction in English), the Pablo A. Tan Prize (nonfiction prose in English), the Philippine Literary Arts Council Prize (poetry in English) the Victorio C. Valledor Prize (poetry in Filipino), the Alfonso T. Ongpin Prize (art), the Elfren S. Cruz Prize (social sciences), the John C. Kaw Prize (history), and the Hilarion and Esther Vibal Prize (journalism).

The 42nd National Book Awards honored the best books written, designed, and published in the Philippines, and this cycle of the awards highlighted titles published in 2023. A total of 326 titles submitted across 31 categories consisting of four languages: English, Filipino, Bikol, and Ilokano. Following the awarding of winners during the 41st cycle last February 2024, the 42nd cycle of the awards is in November 2024 in the historic Intramuros in Manila.

When the National Book Awards began in 1981, there were few quality books being published in the Philippines. Four decades later, hundreds of Philippine books are now of great quality, professionally published and widely read.

== Award Categories ==
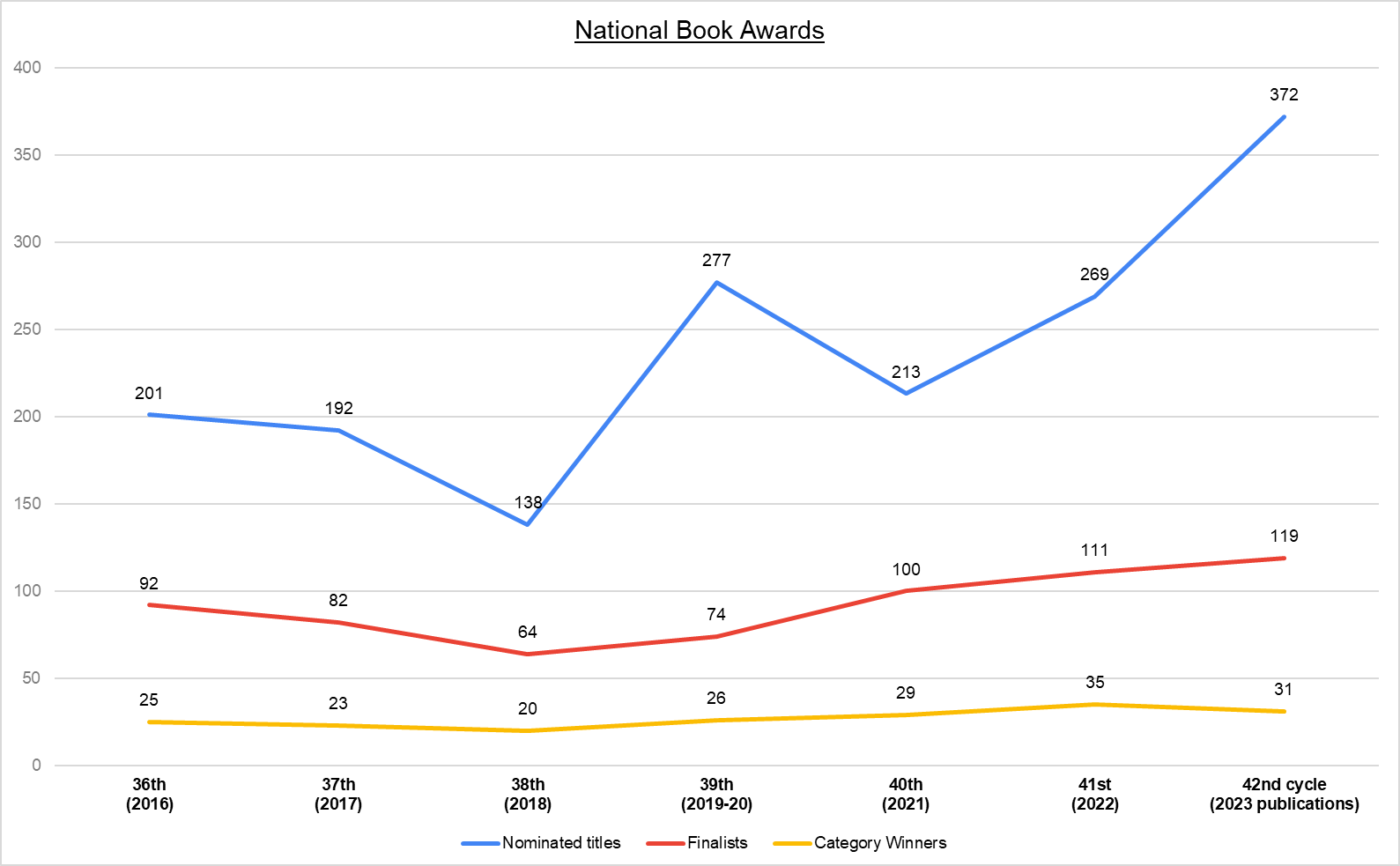
National Book Awards data 2017 to 2024

Literary Division

- Novel in English
- Novel in Filipino
- Short Fiction in English
- Short Fiction in Filipino
- Nonfiction Prose in English
- Nonfiction Prose in Filipino
- Anthology in English
- Anthology in Filipino
- Literary Criticism/Cultural Studies
- Media Studies
- Poetry in English
- Poetry in Filipino
- Graphic Novel and Comics in English
- Graphic Novel and Comics in Filipino
- Translated Book in English
- Translated Book in Filipino
- Drama and Film

Non-Literary Division

- Art
- Social Sciences
- Philosophy
- History
- Humor, Sports, Lifestyle, and Business
- Food
- Science
- Spirituality and Theology
- Professions
- Journalism

Design

Special Prizes

- The Gerardo P. Cabochan Prize (short fiction in Filipino)
- The National Artist Cirilo F. Bautista Prize (short fiction in English)
- The Pablo A. Tan Prize (nonfiction prose in English)
- The Philippine Literary Arts Council Prize (poetry in English)
- The Victorio C. Valledor Prize (poetry in Filipino)
- The Alfonso T. Ongpin Prize (art)
- The Elfren S. Cruz Prize (social sciences)
- The John C. Kaw Prize (history)
- The Hilarion and Esther Vibal Prize (journalism)

== The National Book Awards Trophy ==
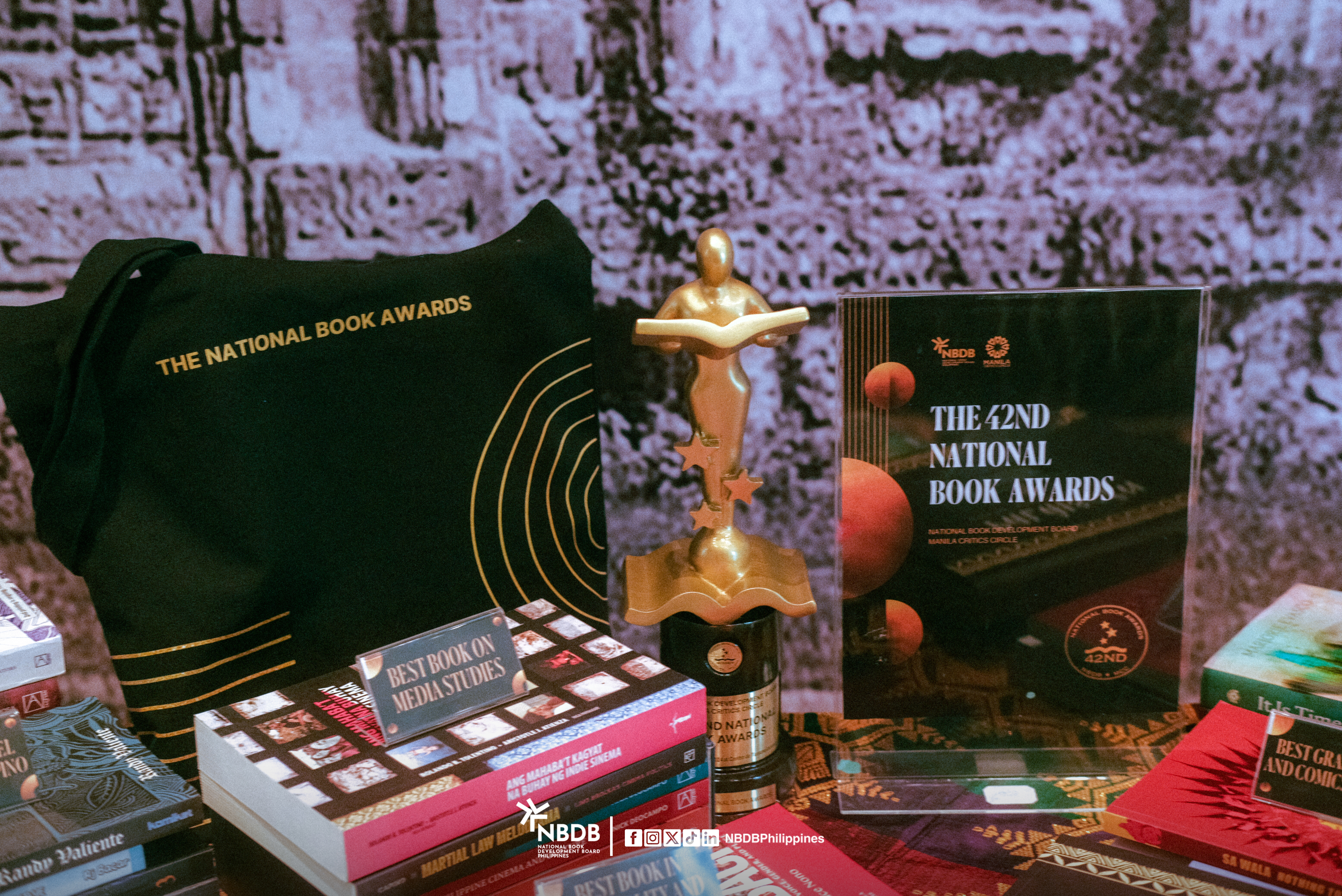
The Philippine National Book Awards trophy designed by Apo Aquino

In the early years, several sculptors donated trophies and, later, when the NBDB took over the management of the awards, those trophies and their design were finally funded. The National Book Awards now has a standardized trophy, much like the Academy Awards has its recognizable Oscar trophy. Our sculptors were Eduardo Castrillo, Agnes Arellano, Manuel Baldemor, Cesare and Jean Marie Syjuco, Edgar Doctor, Gino Gonzalez, National Artist for Sculpture Napoleon Abueva, Tito Sanchez, Glenn Cagandahan, Michael Allen R. Cacnio, Salvador Joel Alonday, Pete Jimenez, Lawin Abueva, and Raul Funilas.

The current National Book Awards Perpetual Trophy was designed by artist Apolinario L. Aquino Jr. and was first used in the 37th National Book Awards in 2018. It symbolizes the Filipino's love of reading books. The half-person-half-pen figure represents all the writers, editors, translators, book designers, creatives, publishers, and book lovers across the country. The book, as its pedestal, signifies the importance of reading—a valuable foundation of education. The black and gold colors embody the significance of books' entertainment value, flair to ignite creativity, and even power to spark a conversation. The design also integrates the logos of the two collaborating partners, the Manila Critics Circle and the National Book Development Board. The trophy is a testament of our pride of the Philippine publication industry.

== Awarding Ceremonies ==
Cycle	Year	Trophy Design	Awards Venue
1st	1982	Eduardo Castrillo	
2nd	1983	Eduardo Castrillo	
3rd	1984	Agnes Arellano	
4th	1985	Agnes Arellano	
5th	1986	Agnes Arellano	
6th	1987	Agnes Arellano	
7th	1988		
8th	1989	Cesare and Jean Marie Syjuco	
9th	1990	Cesare and Jean Marie Syjuco	
10th	1991	Cesare and Jean Marie Syjuco	
11th	1992	Edgar Doctor	
12th	1993	Gino Gonzalez	
13th	1994	Gino Gonzalez	
14th	1995	Gino Gonzalez	
15th	1996	Napoleon Abueva (National Artist)	
16th	1997	Napoleon Abueva (National Artist)	
17th	1998	Napoleon Abueva (National Artist)	
18th	1999	Napoleon Abueva (National Artist)	
19th	2000		SM Megamall, Megatarde Hall
20th	2001		SM Megamall, Megatarde Hall
21st	2002		
22nd	2003	Glenn Cagandahan	SM Megamall, Megatarde Hall
23rd	2004		
24th	2005		World Trade Center
25th	2006	Tito Sanchez	World Trade Center
26th	2007		
27th	2008	Glenn Cagandahan	Yuchengco Museum, Makati City
28th	2009	Michael Cacnio	Ayala Museum, Makati City
29th	2010	Michael Cacnio	Metropolitan Museum, Bangko Sentral ng Pilipinas Complex
30th	2011	Salvador Joey Alanday	National Museum of the Philippines Anthropolog Marble Hall
31st	2012	Michael Cacnio	National Museum of the Philippines Anthropology Old Senate Session Hall
32nd	2013	Michael Cacnio	EDSA Shangri-La, Manila, Garden Ballroom
33rd	2014	Pete Jimenez	National Museum of the Philippines Anthropolog Marble Hall
34th	2015	Mulawin Abueva	National Museum of the Philippines Anthropology Old Senate Session Hall
35th	2016	Raul G. Furnilas	National Museum of the Philippines Fine Arts Auditorium
36th	2017	Raul G. Furnilas	National Museum of the Philippines Fine Arts Auditorium
37th	2018	Apolinario Aquino Jr.	National Museum of the Philippines Fine Arts Auditorium
38th	2019	Apolinario Aquino Jr.	National Museum of the Philippines Fine Arts Auditorium
39th	2022	Apolinario Aquino Jr.	Online, NBDB Facebook and YouTube accounts
40th	2023	Apolinario Aquino Jr.	Metropolitan Theater, Manila
41st	2024	Apolinario Aquino Jr.	Areté, Hyundai Hall and Ubuntu Space, Ateneo de Manila University
42nd	2024	Apolinario Aquino Jr.	Centro de Turismo Intramuros and Museo de Intramuros
43rd	2026	Apolinario Aquino Jr.	SM Megamall, Megatarde Hall

== The 43rd Philippine National Book Awards ==
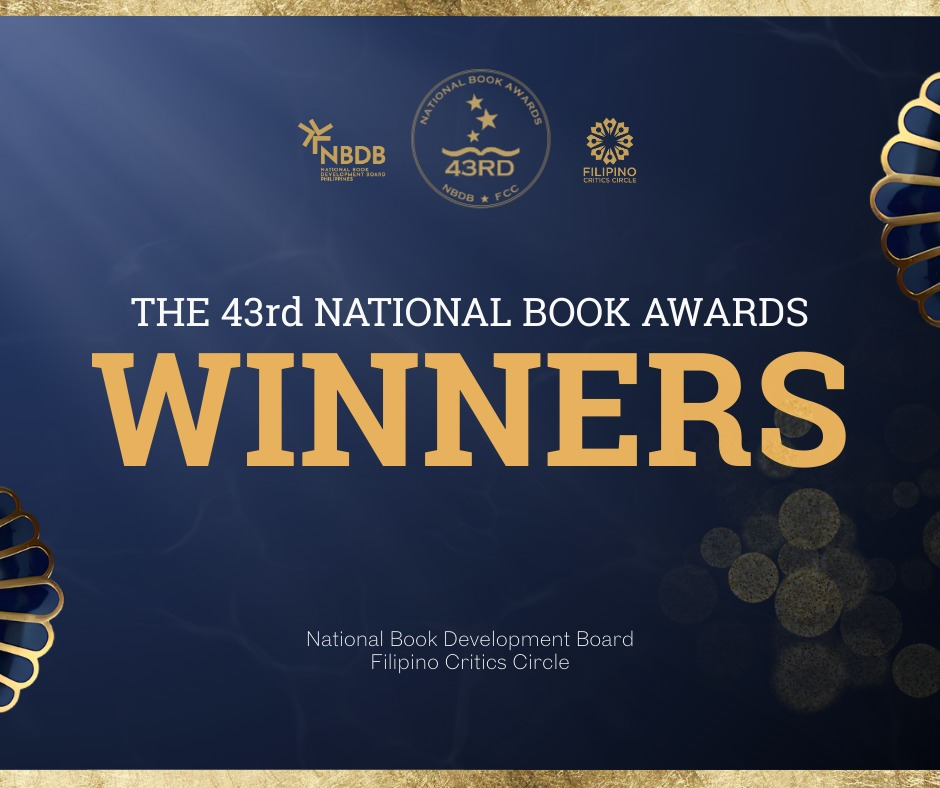
43rd National Book Awards (Philippines) winners

The National Book Development Board (NBDB) and the Filipino Critics Circle (FCC) announced the 30 winning titles in the 43rd Annual National Book Awards (NBA) on February 13, 2026, recognizing this cycle's most outstanding locally published books across diverse genres and languages.

Of 385 titles submitted across 30 categories, written in Filipino, English, Hiligaynon, and Kinaray-a, 139 were selected as finalists. The final 30 winners represent the best-written and best-designed titles in their respective genres, spanning fiction and non-fiction categories including poetry, graphic novels and comics, translation, science, philosophy, history, humor, sports and lifestyle, spirituality and theology, art, food, design, journalism, and business.

The 43rd Philippine National Book Awards ceremony takes place on March 14, 2026 (10:00 to 14:00) at the Megatrade Hall 3, SM Megamall, Mandaluyong City, Metro Manila. The Filipino Critics Circle and the National Book Development Board co-host the event.

== Awards Catalogs (36th cycle, 2017 to 43rd cycle, 2025) ==
In 2017, the National Book Awards catalog was redesigned under the art direction of Anthony John Balisi, adopting a striking black and gold theme. Each year, the catalog showcases a distinct design school of thought, featuring styles such as Art Nouveau, Art Deco, and Brutalism. It has also highlighted traditional design patterns, including the intricate motifs of the Maguindanaon Inaul.

- 36th National Book Awards
- 37th National Book Awards
- 38th National Book Awards
- 39th National Book Awards
- 40th National Book Awards
- 41st National Book Awards
- 42nd National Book Awards
- 43rd National Book Awards

== Award Administrators ==
The Manila Critics Circle (MCC) Founded in 1981, the Manila Critics Circle, Inc. is a non-profit, non-stock organization of professional literary critics and newspaper columnist who believe that Philippine books deserve much more attention than they usually get from business, media and the general public. Aside from giving the Annual Book Awards, the Circle has held an ASEAN-wide literary contest (in cooperation with Filipinas Foundation), participated in the nomination process for National Artist awards, joined National Book exhibits, prepared various position papers on literary publishing, and sat in the National Book Development Board. Members have done reviews for national and international periodicals, such as ASEAN Theater Journal, Asiaweek, Diyaryo Filipino, Filipinas, Filipino Magazin (Filmag), Independent, Journal of Asian Studies, Kinaadman, Manila Chronicle, Manila Times, National Book Review, Philippine Daily Globe, Philippine Daily Inquirer, Philippine Graphic, Philippine Journal of Education, Philippine Panorama, Philippine Star, Philippine Studies, Sun-Star Weekend, Unitas, and World Literature Today, and for television shows such as Mabuhay: This is Your Wake-Up Call.

Rebranding - MCC chair Dean Francis Alfar made an announcement in November 2024 with regards to how to better nurture the Philippine literary ecosystem: "As of next year, we are officially rebranding the MCC to Filipino Critics Circle." The National Book Development Board (NBDB)

The National Book Development Board is the book agency of the Philippines mandated to create a robust environment for publishing that stands on a strong culture of reading. It provides technical and developmental assistance to creatives, publishers, booksellers, enterprises, and individuals involved in the production of books and the business of publishing.

It has a multisector representation which harnesses the creativity of content creators, publishers, book distributors, and readers toward a vibrant book publishing ecosystem.
