= KABQ =

KABQ may refer to:

- The ICAO code for Albuquerque International Sunport
- KABQ (AM), a radio station (1350 AM) licensed to serve Albuquerque, New Mexico, United States
- KABQ-FM, a radio station (95.1 FM) licensed to serve Corrales, New Mexico
- KNFZ, a radio station (104.7 FM) licensed to serve Bosque Farms, New Mexico, which held the call sign KABQ-FM from 2007 to 2021
- KTEG, a radio station (104.1 FM) licensed to serve Santa Fe, New Mexico, which held the call sign KABQ-FM from 2003 to 2007

== See also ==
- QAB, another name of Ryukyu Asahi Broadcasting
