= KVSF =

KVSF may refer to:

- KVSF (AM), a radio station (1400 AM) licensed to Santa Fe, New Mexico, United States
- KVSF-FM, a radio station (101.5 FM) licensed to Pecos, New Mexico, United States
- Hartness State Airport in Springfield, Vermont, United States, which uses the ICAO code KVSF
