= KZRR =

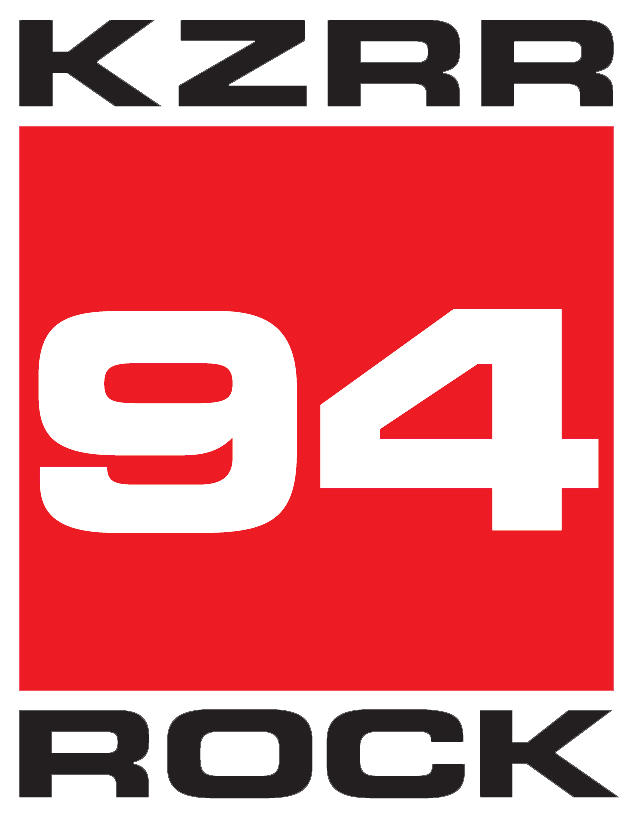
- Albuquerque, New Mexico; United States
- Broadcast area: Albuquerque; Santa Fe
- Frequency: 94.1 MHz (HD Radio)
- Branding: 94 Rock

Programming
- Format: Mainstream rock
- Subchannels: HD2: Mainstream urban "Power 100.9"

Ownership
- Owner: iHeartMedia, Inc.; (iHM Licenses, LLC)
- Sister stations: KABQ; KABQ-FM; KBQI; KPEK; KTEG; K251AU; K265CA

History
- First air date: June 25, 1961
- Former call signs: KDEF-FM (1961–1976); KRKE-FM (1976–1980); KWXL (1980–1985); KRKE-FM (1985–1986)
- Call sign meaning: "Real Rock"

Technical information
- Licensing authority: FCC
- Facility ID: 68609
- Class: C
- ERP: 22,500 watts
- HAAT: 1,259 meters (4,131 ft)
- Translator: HD2: 100.9 K265CA (Albuquerque)

Links
- Public license information: Public file; LMS
- Webcast: Listen live (via iHeartRadio)
- Website: 94rock.iheart.com

KZRR (94.1 FM, "94 Rock") is a commercial radio station in Albuquerque, New Mexico, broadcasting to the Albuquerque-Santa Fe, New Mexico, area. KZRR airs a mainstream rock radio format and is owned by iHeartMedia, Inc. The studios and offices are in Northeast Albuquerque.

KZRR has an effective radiated power (ERP) of 22,500 watts. The transmitter tower is atop Sandia Crest east of the city. It broadcasts using HD Radio technology. The HD-2 digital subchannel features an mainstream urban format, known as "Power 100.9"; that subchannel feeds 250 watt FM translator K265CA at 100.9 MHz.

== Personalities ==
Weekday mornings feature Swami Rob, Skyler and Phil Mahoney. Skyler also is heard in middays. The rest of the station's DJ are voice-tracked from out of town stations.

== History ==
=== Early years: 1961-1977 ===
On June 25, 1961, the station signed on as KDEF-FM, mostly simulcasting sister station KDEF (1150 AM). The station was initially heard from 11 a.m. to 11 p.m., but in May 1962, it began full-time broadcasting. In September 1962, KDEF-AM-FM were sold by owner Frank Quinn to a Philadelphia group.

Doubleday Broadcasting purchased the stations in 1965, and by about 1970, KDEF-FM was operated by the University of Albuquerque as a student run station. Media Horizons purchased the stations in 1973, and moved the studios from downtown to the northeast heights.

In March 1976, KDEF-FM was sold to Gaylord Broadcasting for $150,000, and changed its call sign to KRKE-FM to match KRKE (610 AM), which Gaylord had purchased in 1973. (KDEF AM was separately sold to a different owner.) Plans also included moving the transmitter to Sandia Crest. The format on KRKE-FM was initially modern country. By the end of that year the format was listed as "Automated Rock".

=== Rock: 1977-present ===
Later in 1977, the station picked up the Abrams/Burkhart "Superstars" album-oriented Rock format. That was the first time the station began using the "94 Rock" moniker.

In January 1980, Gaylord sold KRKE AM-FM to the Journal Star station group for $4.5 million. In June, the call letters changed to KWXL still branded as "94 Rock". In March 1985, the stations were sold to Compass Communications. In April, the station changed its call letters back to KRKE-FM, intending to make station identification easier in morning and afternoon drive times, when it was simulcast with KRKE AM. The format was also changed to "Superstars II", with an emphasis on rock titles from the 1960s and 1970s. It also featured a Sunday morning jazz program intending to reach an older audience than KWXL's targeted 18-34 audience.

In 1986, the stations were sold to Sandia Peak Broadcasters. In July, it changed to the current KZRR call sign, rebranding as "The New 94 Rock". KRKE AM changed to KZSS with an adult contemporary format, but in March 1988, it returned to simulcasting KZRR, citing problems of "public perception of the AM band".

In November 1986, the station began weekdays with morning "shock" radio show host TJ Trout. Trout was featured in nearly all billboard and television ads over the next couple of decades, helping keep station ratings high. Trout retired in December 2011.

In 1993, Sandia Peak Broadcasters merged with Progressive Broadcasting, owner of classic rock station KLSK (104.1 FM) to become Twin Peaks Radio. By this time KZRR began to lean more on modern rock without completely changing to that format, promoting itself as "The Cutting Edge of Rock".

In 1996, Trumper Communications purchased KZRR, KZSS and KLSK, as well as modern rock KTEG (then on 107.9) and KHTZ. This also caused a legal dispute with TJ Trout, who sued the former owners when learning that his on-air name had been trademarked. Trout had resigned and had planned to start a new show on KKOB. Trumper resolved the issue by allowing Trout ownership of his name and remaining at KZRR. (Trout joined KKOB in 2019.)

Now clustered with classic rock and modern rock stations, the music format on KZRR had changed to playing mostly hard rock with an emphasis on music from the 1980s, 1990s and early 2000s. In 1999, KZRR was acquired by Clear Channel Communications. Clear Channel changed in its name in 2014 to iHeartMedia, Inc.

== K265CA ==
K265CA
- Albuquerque, New Mexico; United States
- Broadcast area: Albuquerque
- Frequencies: 100.9 MHz (HD Radio via KZRR-HD2)
- Branding: Power 100.9

Programming
- Format: Mainstream urban
- Affiliations: Premiere Networks

Ownership
- Owner: iHeartMedia, Inc.; (iHM Licenses, LLC)
- Sister stations: KABQ, KABQ-FM, KBQI, KPEK, KTEG, KZRR, K251AU

History
- First air date: 1986
- Call sign meaning: K 265 (channel number for FM frequency 100.9); CA (sequential assignment)

Technical information
- Licensing authority: FCC
- Facility ID: 53641
- Class: D
- ERP: 250 watts
- HAAT: 1,230 meters (4,040 ft)

Links
- Public license information: Public file; LMS
- Webcast: Listen Live
- Website: power1009.iheart.com

K265CA (100.9 FM) is a commercial FM translator radio station located in Albuquerque, New Mexico, broadcasting to the Albuquerque metropolitan area, owned by iHeartMedia, Inc. (formerly Clear Channel Communications). Its studios are located in Northeast Albuquerque and the transmitter tower is located atop Sandia Crest.

Programming on K265CA is rebroadcast from the second HD Radio subchannel of KZRR (94.1 FM).

=== History ===
Logo for Christmas format during the last four months of 2013 as well as December of 2018

Logo throughout 2014

The translator began broadcasting in 1986 and has always rebroadcast the programming from 104.1 FM. In February 2013, Clear Channel Communications applied to the FCC for an upgrade from 50 watts to the class maximum of 250 watts, while also changing the programming to rebroadcast an HD radio subchannel. The upgrade was made in June 2013, and on August 27, 2013, K265CA had broken off from rebroadcasting KTEG and began airing its own format from KTEG-HD2 playing Christmas music, which began promoting itself as "Santa 100.9" on September 4, being the first station in broadcast radio to flip to Christmas music for the holidays, and setting a record for the earliest any station in the United States has ever flipped to Christmas music before the holiday itself and possibly the longest any terrestrial radio station has ever run that format.

The Christmas music format had aired commercial free for four months, which also put it in direct competition with KMGA, an Adult Contemporary station which usually changes to the all Christmas music format at about mid-November.

On January 2, 2014, at Midnight, K265CA launched a Rhythmic Oldies format branded as "Hot 100.9" that features hip-hop, R&B and dance-pop from the 1980s, 1990s and early 2000s.

In the Spring of 2014, the HD Radio feed switched from KTEG-HD2 to KZRR-HD2, with the programming remaining the same on K265CA.

On November 3, 2014, the rhythmic oldies format moved over to KLQT, re-branding as "Hot 95.1". "Hot" continued to simulcast on 100.9 for more than two months. On January 10, 2015, K265CA began stunting with a loop of Michael Jackson's "Beat It". On January 12, at Noon, K265CA launched an urban contemporary format, branded as "100.9 The Beat".

Logo used from 2015-2018

On December 14, 2018, the urban format and the "Beat" branding were dropped and the station began stunting with Christmas music again as "Santa 100.9". On December 26, at midnight, the station flipped to soft adult contemporary as "100.9 The Breeze."

On January 22, 2021, at midnight, after playing "Endless Love" by Diana Ross and Lionel Richie, K265CA began stunting with a repeated 3-hour loop of various television theme songs. At Noon, the station flipped back to urban, branded as "Power 100.9". The first song on "Power" was "Body" by Megan Thee Stallion. The format returned with a stint of 10,000 songs in a row commercial-free; the change came after the "Breeze" format had a 0.7 share in the December 2020 Nielsen Audio ratings.

== K251AU ==
K251AU
- Albuquerque, New Mexico; United States
- Frequencies: 98.1 MHz (HD Radio via KBQI-107.9 HD2)
- Branding: 98.1 The Bull

Programming
- Format: Classic country

Ownership
- Owner: iHeartMedia, Inc.
- Sister stations: KABQ, KABQ-FM, KBQI, KPEK, KTEG, KZRR, K265CA

History
- First air date: January 2007
- Call sign meaning: K 251 (channel number for frequency 98.1); AU (sequential assignment)

Technical information
- Licensing authority: FCC
- Facility ID: 139245
- Class: D
- ERP: 165 watts
- HAAT: 1230 meters
- Transmitter coordinates: 35°12′53″N 106°27′2″W

Links
- Public license information: Public file; LMS
- Webcast: Listen Live
- Website: thebullabq.iheart.com

K251AU is an FM translator radio station that serves the Albuquerque, New Mexico area. It broadcasts at 98.1 MHz with a 165 watt signal from atop Sandia Crest, sending a somewhat strong signal into much of the city. Its studios are located in Northeast Albuquerque.

Currently this translator is re-broadcasting programming from the HD2 subchannel of KBQI (107.9 FM).

=== History ===
K251AU began broadcasting in January 2007 with programming from KBNM-LP (98.7 FM), a low-powered radio station based in Belen, New Mexico offering a non-commercial oldies music format. At the time, the translator was running at just 10 watts, and often encountered interference problems with the full-powered KBAC out of Las Vegas, New Mexico. There were also times when the station would be on air with no programming. In April 2013, Clear Channel Communications purchased K251AU from Maria Candelaria for $170,000. At that time it also applied for a construction permit to upgrade the signal to 165 watts. On June 17, 2013 the upgraded signal went on the air stunting with a Christmas music format as "Santa 98.1". On June 21, 2013, K251AU became the new home for the classic country format that had previously aired on KABQ-FM (104.7 FM) since May 2, 2009.

On June 30, 2016, K251AU and KBQI-HD2 rebranded as "98.1 The Bull".
