= KNFZ =

Radio station in Bosque Farms–Albuquerque, New Mexico

- Bosque Farms, New Mexico; United States
- Broadcast area: Albuquerque and central New Mexico
- Frequency: 104.7 MHz (HD Radio)
- Branding: Fuzión

Programming
- Language: Spanish
- Format: Christian Contemporary

Ownership
- Owner: Encouragement Media Group; (Educational Radio Foundation of East Texas, Inc.)

History
- First air date: April 1, 1987; 38 years ago
- Former call signs: KHBN (1985–1987); KMXQ (1987–1995); KEXT (1995–2000); KTEG (2000–2007); KABQ-FM (2007–2021); KKTH (2021–2024)
- Call sign meaning: Fuzíon (branding)

Technical information
- Licensing authority: FCC
- Facility ID: 65704
- Class: C1
- ERP: 100,000 watts
- HAAT: 257 meters (843 ft)
- Transmitter coordinates: 34°46′12″N 106°51′42″W

Links
- Public license information: Public file; LMS
- Webcast: Listen Live
- Website: mifuzion.com

KNFZ (104.7 FM) is a radio station licensed to the suburb of Bosque Farms, New Mexico, and serving the Albuquerque metropolitan area. The station is owned by Encouragement Media Group, through licensee Educational Radio Foundation of East Texas, Inc. KKTH broadcasts a 100,000-watt signal from a site close to Belen, nearly 35 miles south of Albuquerque sending a signal that is a bit weak with some static on many radios (even car radios) in much of the city.

KNFZ broadcasts in HD.

== History ==
=== 104.7 history ===
This station originated in the Socorro area. It was first assigned the KHBN call sign on January 9, 1985, and signed on April 1, 1987. On October 5, 1987, the call sign was then changed to KMXQ and had a country music format, which still airs in Socorro on 92.9 FM. By early 1995, station owner Art Holt had changed its city of license to Bosque Farms and moved into the Albuquerque market. On March 6, 1995, the call sign was changed to KEXT with a Spanish AC/Romance format as "Radio Exitos" that would operate under a local marketing agreement with KXKS 1190. In April 1996, The Holt Corporation would sell KEXT to KXKS owner Continental Communications for $450,000. In July 1996, Continental would also purchase KABQ 1350 for $100,000. By January 2000, Continental would sell the three radio stations and low-powered television station K59DB to Clear Channel Communications for $7.4 million. Clear Channel had recently purchased five other FM stations in the market from Trumper communications. The addition of KEXT gave them an unprecedented sixth FM station in a single market, which would become an issue in 2006 when the company announced plans to go private. Clear Channel had established the Aloha Station Trust in June 2007. 104.7 would be operated by the trust until April 2021.

=== KTEG "The Edge" ===
On July 25, 2000, the KTEG call sign and modern rock format that had been launched on 107.9 FM (now KBQI) was moved to 104.7 FM to replace KEXT (which had been simulcasting Regional Mexican KXKS "La Super X") and use 107.9 to launch a new country format. In this era of "The Edge", the station started playing heavier rock music from bands that it had not previously played including Metallica and Pantera, while dropping bands such as U2 and No Doubt that were frequently heard on the previous frequency. On December 13, 2007, the KTEG call sign and modern rock format was again moved to 104.1 FM and the KABQ-FM call sign and smooth jazz format were moved to 104.7 FM.

=== Smooth Jazz 104.7 ===
A new format playing smooth jazz music programmed by satellite from Broadcast Architecture had launched on September 29, 2006, on 104.1 FM. On December 13, 2007, the station relocated from 104.1 FM to 104.7, a weaker signal in the Albuquerque market. The format lasted until May 2, 2009.

=== Classic country ===
On May 2, 2009, KABQ-FM flipped to classic country with music mainly from the 1980s. The station featured several personalities that were voice-tracked from outside the market. On June 21, 2013, the format moved to an HD subchannel of KBQI that is rebroadcast on FM translator K251AU (98.1 FM).

=== Classic hits and 1980s hits ===
On July 2, 2013, KABQ-FM flipped to classic hits, branded as "104-7 KABQ Albuquerque's Classic Hits", and featuring music from the 1960s, 1970s and 1980s. The format did not feature any on-air personalities and had low ratings. On May 2, 2016, KABQ-FM shifted to an all-1980s hits format. With the change, Mitch Craig, who had previously been the voice of KRQE, became the official voiceover talent for the station. This brought the all-1980s format back to the Albuquerque market after KRKE ended the format in late September 2015 in preparation of a sale of that station.

=== Donation and flip ===
On February 5, 2021, iHeartMedia's Aloha Station Trust LLC announced they would donate the station to the Delmarva Educational Association. On April 16, 2021, the donation was completed. Following consummation, the station went dark. On April 27, 2021, the call sign changed to KKTH. The KABQ-FM call sign would be moved to former sister station KOLZ on May 31. On June 4, 2021, the station returned to the air as "Buenas Nuevas", airing Spanish-language Christian contemporary music. However, by the end of that month, the station would broadcast dead air for a few weeks, and by about late July, would once again go off the air. It returned to the air in early fall 2021.

On September 22, 2023, Delmarva announced it would sell KKTH to the Educational Radio Foundation of East Texas (which also operates under the name Encouragement Media Group) for $400,000, with the company to take over control by a local marketing agreement on October 1. The station retained the Spanish Christian format, but rebranded under ERFET's "Fuzión" brand, also heard on KGFZ in Lufkin, Texas. The sale was consummated on January 31, 2024, with the station changing its call sign to KNFZ on February 7.
