= KVCN =

VCY America radio station in Los Alamos, New Mexico

Coordinates: 35.7806°N 106.5270°W

- Los Alamos, New Mexico; United States
- Broadcast area: Santa Fe, Albuquerque and Northern New Mexico
- Frequency: 106.7 MHz

Programming
- Format: Conservative Christian
- Network: VCY America

Ownership
- Owner: VCY America, Inc.

History
- First air date: 1987 (as KBOM)
- Former call signs: KPZA (7/1986-8/1986); KBOM (1986–2000); KKPL (2000–2001); KZNM (2001–2007); KLVO (2007–2011); KDLW (2011–2013); KAGM (2013–2017)
- Call sign meaning: VCY New Mexico

Technical information
- Facility ID: 65277
- Class: C0
- ERP: 44,000 watts
- HAAT: 592 meters (1,942 ft)

Links
- Webcast: Listen Live
- Website: vcyamerica.org

KVCN (106.7 FM) is a radio station licensed to Los Alamos, New Mexico, and serving Northern New Mexico, including Santa Fe and Albuquerque. It broadcasts a Conservative Christian radio format featuring programming from its owner's network, VCY America.

KVCN has an effective radiated power (ERP) of 44,000 watts. The transmitter tower is on a high peak in Jemez Springs, in the Valles Caldera National Preserve, west of Los Alamos. Programming is also heard on a network of FM translators around New Mexico and Southern Colorado.

== Station history ==
106.7 signed on in 1987 as KBOM with a Spanish Contemporary music format. In 1990 it would be home to an Oldies format for northern New Mexico branded as "K-Bomb" with slogans such as Oldies Blast From the Past. The name referenced the city of license Los Alamos as being the birthplace of the atomic bomb. In 2000, it would be purchased by American General Media (AGM) along with Santa Fe area stations 107.5, 94.7, 1260 and 1400 from Withers Broadcasting Co. for $7 million. (The rest of the cluster would eventually be sold to Hutton Broadcasting). AGM already had its own oldies station on KABG, however the K-Bomb format would relocate to the 94.7 frequency in Santa Fe, although AGM would bring a permanent end to it in 2002.

In early 2001, AGM would launch "The Planet" on 106.7 as KKPL with a modern rock format that used the slogan World Class Modern Rock. However, soon after its debut, Citadel Communications, a major player in the Albuquerque/Santa Fe radio market, would change two of its stations to rock formats, including a similar format on 103.3 FM as well as a classic rock station to compete against Clear Channel, which had owned most of the market rock radio stations at the time. This would put KKPL in competition with about six other area rock stations for advertising revenue. Longtime KTEG morning host "Buck" was among the local personalities at this short-lived station.

Therefore, in late September 2001, after only nine months on the air, AGM had thrown in the towel and changed 106.7 to a Spanish language music format as "Radio Sol" with call letters KZNM. Initially, "Sol" had emulated the long running format on local public radio station KANW-FM 89.1, which features New Mexico-based Spanish-language music artists. The commercial effort did not succeed and the format on KZNM would eventually shift to Spanish oldies in 2004. KZNM was consistently the lowest Arbitron rated FM station in the Albuquerque radio market and failed to make several ratings books.

106.7 FM's broadcast was upgraded to 44,000 watts effective radiated power in early 2007; it previously broadcast at 15,000 watts.

In March 2007, it switched to Regional Mexican as "La Ley", but in November 2007, AGM moved its other Regional Mexican station KLVO "Radio Lobo" from 97.7 FM to 106.7 FM.

"Radio Lobo", meanwhile, was launched in early 1995 on 97.7 FM and had been the top Arbitron rated Spanish-language radio station in Albuquerque for many years, but its competitor, Univision-owned KJFA ("La Jefa"), had turned up efforts to compete with Lobo in early 2007. It had moved to a stronger signal and added the Piolin morning program, which has resulted in better ratings and creating a more competitive battle in the format. 106.7 has a similar coverage area as KJFA, but uses less than half the power as the 100 kW signal on 105.1. The new signal, along with other programming changes, proved to be ineffective for KLVO, as KJFA would go on to become the top Regional Mexican music station and often the top rated Spanish-language radio station in the market. KLVO's ratings would continue to sink to dramatic lows by the end of the 2000s, falling far behind KJFA and other area Spanish-language radio stations. The format was dropped on January 31, 2011, after about 16 years on the air. However, it has since been revived on the original 97.7 frequency.

On January 31, 2011, AGM moved its Mainstream Top 40 station branded as "OMG! Radio" and KDLW call letters from 97.7 to 106.7. ("OMG!" was launched on August 24, 2009 on the 97.7 FM frequency with a mainstream top 40 format, shifting away from an underperforming rhythmic top 40 format that was previously airing on that station for more than a year and a half.) The move occurred because of the signal clarity of 106.7, which has a more clear signal in most of the Albuquerque area than 97.7, as well as extending its reach to areas in northern New Mexico, including Santa Fe. The broadcast on 97.7 ended on February 17, 2011, when 97.7 flipped to a Contemporary Christian format as "Shine 97.7".

"OMG!" competed against KKOB-FM, and since May 2012, KLQT, for listeners, creating a three way market race in the format.

Personalities on "OMG!" included Jeff and Jamie in the morning, as well as Stephanie in middays, Justin Case in afternoons, and Vanilla John at night.

On April 1, 2013, at 8 AM, the rhythmic/urban format previously airing on 106.3 moved up to the 106.7 frequency along with the KAGM callsign, displacing the "OMG!" Mainstream CHR format (which moved to 106.3 and rebranded as "Z 106.3"), and rebranded as "Power 106.7".

On April 4, 2014, former KKSS airstaff members DJ Lopez, Johnny V, and MQ all joined KAGM, replacing the former airstaff and Program Director Phillip "Picazzo" Stevens. KAGM morning show Double J In The Morning and his co-host Lyndsie Lohan stayed with the station. DJ Lopez was the PD and midday host at KAGM, as well as PD at sister stations KDLW and KARS, while Johnny V and MQ reprised their respective shifts at KAGM. They were also joined by Julian Robles of KJFA, who joined AGM's KLVO. Around the same time, the station had also gone from "Today and Back in the Day" to returning to the current-based rhythmic contemporary format and slogan "Where Hip-Hop Lives" amidst the recent launches of "old school" formats on iHeartMedia's Hot 95.1 and Univision's Yo! 101.3 putting the station in direct competition with KKSS again, as well as iHeartMedia's 100.9 The Beat. DJ Lopez resigned from KAGM in June 2015 and AGM brought back Stevens to program KAGM and KDLW after terminating him a year earlier.

On December 15, 2015, the entire airstaff of KAGM (except Stevens) was let go, leading to rumors of a format change. On December 28, at Noon, KAGM rebranded as "Wild 106.7". While continuing with the Rhythmic format, KAGM shifted from a hip-hop/R&B focus to a more dance-pop lean. However, the change backfired for KAGM, as the station slipped dramatically in the ratings, and within 9 months, KAGM was ranked near last in the market, leading to the dismissal of Stevens the following September.

On October 3, 2016, at Midnight, after playing "End of the Road" by Boyz II Men, KAGM changed their format to modern adult contemporary, branded as "106.7 The River". The first song on "The River" was "Hold Back the River" by James Bay.

On June 14, 2017, AGM announced that they would acquire Univision's entire Albuquerque cluster. To satisfy ownership limit laws set by the Federal Communications Commission, AGM would sell KAGM to VCY America, who would convert the station to non-commercial status and flip it to religious programming. The sale price was $900,000; the sale was approved by the FCC on August 23, 2017 and consummated on September 1, 2017.

On September 1, 2017, the station changed its call sign to KVCN. The following day, the station changed to a Christian format.

== Former logos ==
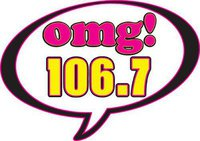
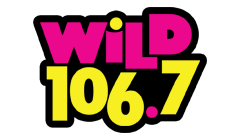

== Translators ==
KVCN broadcasts its programming on these translators across New Mexico and Southern Colorado. VCY America acquired the translators from Calvary of Albuquerque in 2019. All had previously broadcast KLYT. KVCN began airing on August 23, 2019 according to the network website.

Call sign	Frequency	City of license	FID	ERP (W)	Class	FCC info
K293AO	106.5 FM	Alamosa, Colorado	154972	250	D	LMS
K214DE	90.7 FM	Antonito, Colorado	89884	10	D	LMS
K203EZ	88.5 FM	Alamogordo, New Mexico	10948	10	D	LMS
K218AK	91.5 FM	Artesia, New Mexico	10944	63	D	LMS
K207CQ	89.3 FM	Gallup, New Mexico	90091	100	D	LMS
K211CW	90.1 FM	Hobbs, New Mexico	78075	57	D	LMS
K250AB	97.9 FM	Roswell, New Mexico	10924	205	D	LMS
K220CE	91.9 FM	Ruidoso, New Mexico	10918	82	D	LMS
K212EH	90.3 FM	Silver City, New Mexico	76190	2	D	LMS
