= KAGM =

KAGM may refer to:

- KVCN, a radio station (106.7 FM) licensed to serve Los Alamos, New Mexico, United States, which held the call sign KAGM from 2013 to 2017
- KXOT (FM), a radio station (106.3 FM) licensed to serve Los Lunas, New Mexico, which held the call sign KAGM from 2005 to 2013
