= KZNM =

KZNM may refer to:

- KZNM (FM), a radio station (100.9 FM) licensed to serve Towaoc, Colorado, United States
- KVCN, a radio station (106.7 FM) licensed to serve Los Alamos, New Mexico, which held the call sign KZNM from 2001 to 2007
