= Belen Harvey House =

- U.S. National Register of Historic Places
- NM State Register of Cultural Properties
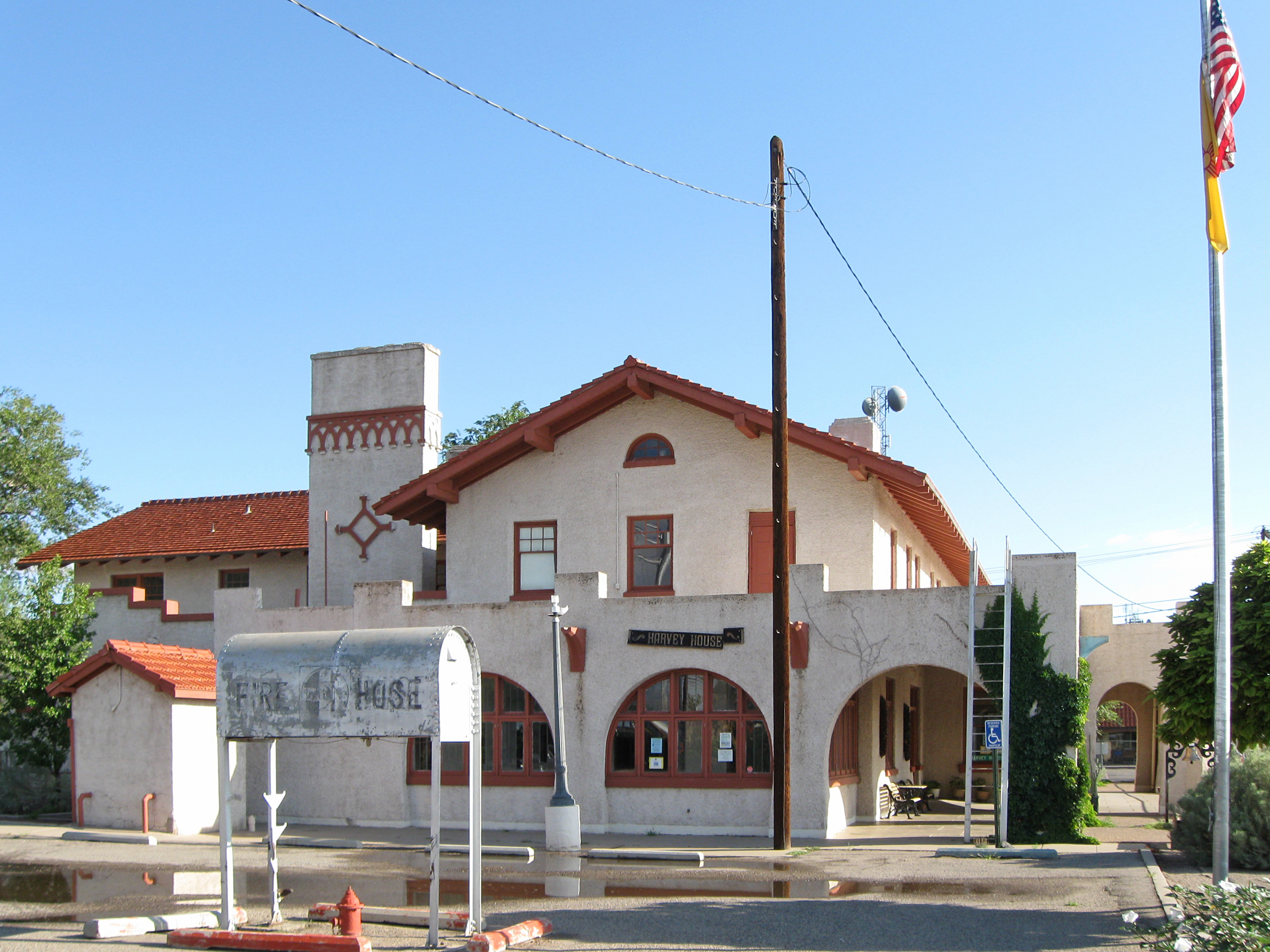

- Location within New Mexico Location within the United States
- Location: 104 North 1st Street, Belen, New Mexico
- Coordinates: 34°39′36″N 106°46′02″W
- Area: less than one acre
- Built: 1910
- Architect: Myron Church
- Architectural style: Mission/Spanish Revival
- NRHP reference No.: 83004180
- NMSRCP No.: 886

Significant dates
- Added to NRHP: October 28, 1983
- Designated NMSRCP: October 1, 1982

The Belen Harvey House, at 104 North 1st Street in Belen, New Mexico, also known as the Harvey House Museum, was believed to have been built in 1901 as the Santa Fe Hotel, however this theory was disproved in 2001 by an architectural engineer from the Office of Historic Preservation out of Santa Fe. The building was built in 1910 as a Harvey House, one of a number of restaurants at railway stations in the U.S. southwest. The architect for the building was Myron Church and the architectural style is Mission/Spanish Revival. The building is currently used as a museum. It was listed on the National Register of Historic Places in 1983.
