= KPEK =

Hot adult contemporary radio station in Albuquerque, New Mexico, United States

Coordinates: 35.214°N 106.451°W

Albuquerque, New Mexico; United States
- Broadcast area: Albuquerque, Santa Fe, New Mexico and surrounding areas
- Frequency: 100.3 MHz (HD Radio)
- Branding: 100.3 The Peak

Programming
- Format: Hot adult contemporary
- Subchannels: HD2: Dance Nation 90's
- Affiliations: Premiere Networks

Ownership
- Owner: iHeartMedia, Inc.; (iHM Licenses, LLC)
- Sister stations: KABQ (AM), KABQ-FM, KBQI, KTEG, KZRR, K251AU, K265CA

History
- First air date: December 1974
- Former call signs: KPAR-FM (1974–1980); KKJY (1980–1994); KHTZ (1994–1996)
- Call sign meaning: Peak

Technical information
- Licensing authority: FCC
- Facility ID: 4704
- Class: C
- ERP: 22,500 watts
- HAAT: 1,253 meters (4,111 ft)

Links
- Public license information: Public file; LMS
- Webcast: Listen live (via iHeartRadio)
- Website: 1003thepeak.iheart.com

KPEK (100.3 FM) is a commercial radio station located in Albuquerque, New Mexico. KPEK airs a hot adult contemporary music format branded as "The Peak". Owned by iHeartMedia, Inc. (formerly Clear Channel Communications), its studios are located in Northeast Albuquerque and the transmitter tower is atop Sandia Crest east of the city.

KPEK broadcasts in the HD Radio format.

The Peak features Jackie, Tony & Donnie in the morning; local personality Ryan in middays; Randi West, who originates at WMTX in Tampa, Florida, in afternoons; and Haze from KMYI in San Diego, California, at night.

== History ==
100.3 went on the air in 1974 as KPAR-FM.

In 1979 the station became KKJY with an easy listening format made up of mostly instrumental music branded as "K-Joy". K-Joy lasted for about 15 years and shifted to smooth jazz around 1993.

In late 1994, KKJY switched from smooth jazz to 70s oldies. The callsign changed to KHTZ branded as "K-Hits". This format lasted under two years by which time the station was sold to Trumper Communications in 1996.

In September 1996, "100.3 The Peak" debuted under new KPEK call letters. Initially, KPEK aired a modern adult contemporary format built on the popularity of artists such as Hootie & the Blowfish, Counting Crows and Alanis Morissette. Gene & Julie were the first morning show hosts on the station, and would help to grow the station's audience before moving to a bigger market in 1999. KPEK was purchased by Clear Channel Communications in 1999. By 2000, KPEK's format had skewed towards alternative rock after its sister station KTEG moved to heavier rock. Their slogan at that time was "music for the rest of us", and would be one of the top rated stations in Albuquerque. By early 2001, two of its competitors would challenge the station, creating a fierce battle in the alternative format, as well as a sister station on 104.1 flipping to a AAA format by 2002. By 2003, KPEK would bring on Tony & Jackie, who had been heard on local top 40 stations KKSS, KCHQ, and KKOB-FM in past years, for mornings. The Peak would also shift to a Hot AC format, returning it to a pop-based format rather than a rock-based one. The station's slogan throughout the rest of the decade was "80's, 90's and Now". The Peak had often featured a large selection of 80's music that it termed "Tainted 80's" for much of the first 15 years of the station's run. By 2010, the station began to focus more on the 90's, 2000s and current music with less 80's, although a small amount of 80's music has still been featured.
