= Damon Gray (singer) =

American country music singer

- Born: Belen, New Mexico
- Genres: Country
- Occupation: Singer-songwriter
- Instrument: Guitar
- Years active: 2000–present
- Labels: Broken Bow

Damon Gray (born in Belen, New Mexico) is an American country music singer. Gray was 16 years old when he began his professional career. He moved to Nashville in August 1989.

Gray was the first artist signed to Broken Bow Records, who released his debut album, Lookin' for Trouble, in February 2000. Its first single, "I'm Lookin' for Trouble", peaked at number 75 on the Billboard Hot Country Singles & Tracks chart. The album received a mixed review from Chet Flippo of Billboard, who wrote that "despite a certain unevenness here, Gray shows considerable potential, which is probably due to the many different configurations of five different producers who worked on the album."

== Discography ==
=== Albums ===
Title	Album details
Lookin' for Trouble	Release date: February 29, 2000; Label: Broken Bow Records

=== Singles ===
Year	Single	Peak positions	Album
Year	Single	US Country	Album
2000	"I'm Lookin' for Trouble"	75	Lookin' for Trouble

=== Music videos ===
Year	Video	Director
2000	"I'm Lookin' for Trouble"	chris rogers
