= KLBU =

Radio station in Santa Fe, New Mexico

Coordinates: 36.089°N 106.029°W

- Santa Fe, New Mexico; United States
- Frequency: 94.7 MHz
- Branding: Jam'n 94.7

Programming
- Format: Rhythmic contemporary
- Affiliations: Compass Media Networks; United Stations Radio Networks

Ownership
- Owner: Hutton Broadcasting, LLC
- Sister stations: KBAC, KQBA, KTRC, KVSF (AM), KVSF-FM

History
- First air date: 2000
- Former call signs: KZXA (1992–2000, CP); KBOM (2000–2007); KKIM-FM (2007–2015)
- Call sign meaning: "Blu", previous brand on 102.9

Technical information
- Licensing authority: FCC
- Facility ID: 31801
- Class: C1
- ERP: 100,000 watts
- HAAT: 243 meters (797 ft)

Links
- Public license information: Public file; LMS
- Webcast: Listen Live
- Website: santafe.com/radio_stations/94-7-jamn

KLBU (94.7 FM) is a commercial radio station in Santa Fe, New Mexico. KLBU airs a rhythmic contemporary radio format branded as "Jam'n 94.7", and is owned by Hutton Broadcasting. Its radio studios and offices are in Santa Fe.

KLBU has an effective radiated power (ERP) of 100,000 watts, the maximum for non-grandfathered FM stations. The transmitter is off New Mexico State Road 68 in Alcalde, New Mexico. A 5,200 watt booster station, known as KLBU-2, also on 94.7 MHz, operates in Santa Fe, to improve reception in the state capital.

== History ==
The station (formerly KBOM) has had numerous formats in recent years from the long-running "K-Bomb" oldies format that had relocated (along with the KBOM call-sign) from 106.7 FM (now KAGM) after it was sold in late 2000, to Rhythmic Top 40 as "The Bomb" from 2002–2004, smooth jazz in 2004–2005, and simulcasting the news and talk format from sister station KAGM 106.3 in Albuquerque. In September 2006 listeners were asked to vote for the new format on a website that had been set up after the KAGM simulcast was discontinued. The result would be "High Altitude Rock" a mix of classic rock, alternative, and adult album alternative aimed at outdoor enthusiasts. The format was planned to move to KVSF-FM 101.5 which was purchased by Hutton Broadcasting but had instead changed to "Project 101.5".

On June 29, 2007, 94.7 became KKIM-FM with a religious format that was simulcast from KKIM (AM) 1000 in Albuquerque.

On November 5, 2012, KKIM-FM switched to a Regional Mexican music format branded as "Radio Lobo" simulcast from KLVO in Belen/Albuquerque.

In April 2015, American General Media and Hutton Broadcasting agreed to swap stations in Santa Fe, with KKIM-FM going to Hutton and KLBU 102.9 going to AGM. On June 30, 2015, the callsign on the booster for 102.9 in Santa Fe was changed to KSFE-1 while KLBU-1 was assigned to the 94.7 booster however KLBU remained the callsign for 102.9 and KKIM-FM for 94.7 until July 31.

On July 31, 2015, KKIM-FM changed their call letters to KLBU and changed their format to rhythmic hot adult contemporary, branded as "Jam'n 94.7". Radio Lobo moved to KSFE 102.9.
