= KTRC =

- Santa Fe, New Mexico; United States
- Broadcast area: Santa Fe metropolitan area
- Frequency: 1260 kHz
- Branding: Talk 1260 KTRC

Programming
- Format: Progressive talk
- Affiliations: ABC News Radio; Compass Media Networks; Premiere Networks

Ownership
- Owner: Hutton Broadcasting, LLC
- Sister stations: KBAC; KLBU; KQBA; KVSF; KVSF-FM

History
- First air date: February 14, 1992
- Former call signs: KVSF (1992–2002)

Technical information
- Licensing authority: FCC
- Facility ID: 12970
- Class: B
- Power: 5,000 watts (day); 1,000 watts (night)
- Transmitter coordinates: 35°40′56″N 105°58′21″W
- Translator: (103.7 MHz) K279CX (Santa Fe)

Links
- Public license information: Public file; LMS
- Website: santafe.com/radio_stations/ktrc-1260-103-7-talk/

KTRC (1260 AM) is a commercial radio station licensed to Santa Fe, New Mexico airing a progressive talk radio format. The station is owned by Hutton Broadcasting, LLC. Its studios and transmitter are located in Santa Fe.

By day, KTRC is powered at 5,000 watts. At sunset KTRC reduces power to 1,000 watts to protect other stations on 1260 AM. Programming is also heard on 250 watt FM translator K279CX at 103.7 MHz.

== History ==
The station went on the air as KVSF on February 14, 1992. On July 23, 2002, the station changed its call sign to the current KTRC.

The station was purchased by American General Media in 2000 from Withers Broadcasting Co. in a $7 million deal that included KVSF (1400 AM}, KQBA (107.5 FM), KLBU (94.7 FM) and KVCN (106.7 FM). KTRC was acquired by Hutton Broadcasting in 2008. All these stations except KVCN, were eventually acquired by Hutton.

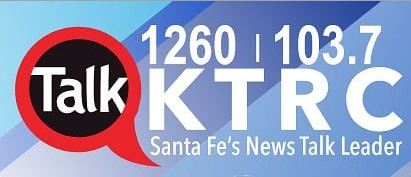
Logo before translator sign on

Hutton Broadcasting had a construction permit to move translator K235CO from Socorro to Santa Fe to broadcast this station on the FM band at 103.7. The translator was licensed for the new facility as K279CX effective February 21, 2018.
