= KBQI =

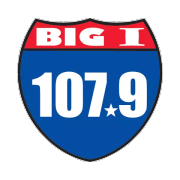
- Albuquerque, New Mexico; United States
- Broadcast area: Albuquerque metropolitan area
- Frequency: 107.9 MHz (HD Radio)
- Branding: Big I 107.9

Programming
- Format: Country music
- Subchannels: HD2: Classic country
- Affiliations: Premiere Networks

Ownership
- Owner: iHeartMedia, Inc.; (iHM Licenses, LLC)
- Sister stations: KABQ, KABQ-FM, KPEK, KTEG, KZRR, K251AU, K265CA

History
- First air date: April 27, 1979
- Former call signs: KFMG (1979–1991); KAMX (1991–1994); KTEG (1994–2000)
- Call sign meaning: Albuquerque's Big I interchange

Technical information
- Licensing authority: FCC
- Facility ID: 4706
- Class: C
- ERP: 22,500 watts
- HAAT: 1,259 meters (4,131 ft)
- Translator: HD2: 98.1 K251AU (Albuquerque)

Links
- Public license information: Public file; LMS
- Webcast: Listen live (via iHeartRadio); Listen live (HD2)
- Website: bigi1079.iheart.com HD2: thebullabq.iheart.com

KBQI (107.9 FM, "Big I 107.9") is a commercial radio station in Albuquerque, New Mexico. It carries a country music format and is owned by iHeartMedia, Inc. The studios are on Masthead Street in northeast Albuquerque.

KBQI is a Class C station with an effective radiated power (ERP) of 22,500 watts. The transmitter tower is atop Sandia Crest east of the city. KBQI broadcasts using HD Radio technology. It airs a classic country format on its HD-2 subchannel, "The Bull," which feeds FM translator K251AU at 98.1 MHz.

== History ==
=== KFMG ===
This station signed on the air on April 27, 1979. The original call sign was KFMG and it aired an album oriented rock (AOR) format programmed by Frank Felix. KFMG featured a tight playlist of about 250 titles, the most popular researched songs. Felix wanted to create a more mass appeal rock sound as proven by the success of 106.7 KBPI in Denver.

Rock programmer Carey Curelop later assumed program director duties. The station became the top rated station among its target audience. KFMG, branded as "Rock 108", continued to be one of Albuquerque's top rock stations for much of the 1980s.

In May 1985, KFMG and its AM sister station KAMX 1520 were sold to Coastal Communications for $2,125,000. By the end of the 1980s, KFMG experienced declining ratings falling further behind rival KZRR "94 Rock". In 1990, it faced a new competitor, KRBL 98.5 (now KABG). KRBL edged past KFMG in the Fall 1990 Arbitron ratings.

=== KAMX-FM ===
In early March 1991, KFMG flipped to a hot adult contemporary format with most of the rock airstaff let go. With the switch to Hot AC, the station changed its call letters to KAMX-FM, branded as "Mix 107.9".

Mix was not be a strong performer in the market. In June 1994, Coastal Communications sold KAMX-AM-FM to Bengal Communications for $750,000. Bengal also purchased easy listening outlet KKJY 100.3 (now KPEK) for $1.5 million. On October 17, 1994, KAMX-FM began stunting with a gag format made up of sound effects.

=== KTEG ===
On October 19 at 5pm, KAMX-FM switched to modern rock. Meanwhile, KAMX 1520 discontinued its simulcast. A month later, the FM station's call letters changed to KTEG and it branded as "107.9 The Edge, Albuquerque's New Rock Alternative." The new format quickly improved ratings for the station, putting in the top 10 while becoming the leading rock station in the market for a while.

In March 1996, Bengal sold KTEG, KDZZ 1520 and KHTZ 100.3 to Trumper Communications for $7.4 million. In June of that year, Trumper also purchased KZRR 94.1 and AM simulcast KZSS 610, along with classic rock outlet KLSK 104.1. While KTEG's modern rock sound was unchanged, KZRR shifted to a mainstream rock format. In addition, Trumper flipped 100.3 to a modern adult contemporary format. That consequentially created fragmentation in the alternative format.

=== KBQI ===
In August 1999, Trumper sold its the Albuquerque cluster (which now included 95.1 added earlier in the year). The buyer was San Antonio-based Clear Channel Communications and the price tag was $55.5 million.

After entering the Albuquerque radio market, Clear Channel decided to challenge the top-rated station country station, 92.3 KRST. It launched a new country sound on 107.9 FM. In July 2000, KTEG was moved to 104.7 (recently purchased from Continental Communications) to make way for a new station on 107.9 FM, KBQI.

KBQI took its branding, "Big I 107-9", from the I-40 and I-25 interchange near downtown Albuquerque that is locally known as "the Big I". At the time of the station's launch, the "Big I" was at the start of a major reconstruction project which finished in May 2002.

To kick off the country music format, former 92.3 KRST morning personalities Tony Lynn and Myles Copeland began hosting the morning shift on KBQI. This helped to make KBQI competitive with KRST, which had once dominated the country format in the Albuquerque market. Tony and Myles were the wake-up team for 11 years until they were let go in October 2011. They were replaced by the syndicated Bobby Bones Show, which airs on most iHeart country stations.

=== HD Radio ===
In February 2006, the station began broadcasting in the HD Radio format. On its HD-2 digital subchannel, it launched a country variety sound.

On June 21, 2013, the HD-2 subchannel started airing a classic country music format. The classic country sound began re-broadcasting on FM translator K251AU at 98.1 FM.

== K251AU ==
K251AU
- Albuquerque, New Mexico; United States
- Frequencies: 98.1 MHz (HD Radio via KBQI-107.9 HD2)
- Branding: 98.1 The Bull

Programming
- Format: Classic country

Ownership
- Owner: iHeartMedia, Inc.; (iHM Licenses, LLC)
- Sister stations: KABQ, KABQ-FM, KBQI, KPEK, KTEG, KZRR, K265CA

History
- First air date: January 2007
- Call sign meaning: K 251 (channel number for frequency 98.1); AU (sequential assignment)

Technical information
- Licensing authority: FCC
- Facility ID: 139245
- Class: D
- ERP: 165 watts
- HAAT: 1230 meters
- Transmitter coordinates: 35°12′53″N 106°27′2″W

Links
- Public license information: Public file; LMS
- Webcast: Listen Live
- Website: thebullabq.iheart.com

K251AU is an FM translator radio station that serves the Albuquerque, New Mexico area. It broadcasts at 98.1 MHz with a 165 watt signal from atop Sandia Crest, sending a somewhat strong signal into much of the city. Its studios are located in Northeast Albuquerque.

Currently this translator is re-broadcasting programming from the HD2 subchannel of KBQI (107.9 FM).

=== History ===
K251AU began broadcasting in January 2007 with programming from KBNM-LP (98.7 FM), a low-powered radio station based in Belen, New Mexico offering a non-commercial oldies music format. At the time, the translator was running at just 10 watts, and often encountered interference problems with the full-powered KBAC out of Las Vegas, New Mexico. There were also times when the station would be on air with no programming. In April 2013, Clear Channel Communications purchased K251AU from Maria Candelaria for $170,000. At that time it also applied for a construction permit to upgrade the signal to 165 watts. On June 17, 2013 the upgraded signal went on the air stunting with a Christmas music format as "Santa 98.1". On June 21, 2013, K251AU became the new home for the classic country format that had previously aired on KABQ-FM (104.7 FM) since May 2, 2009.

On June 30, 2016, K251AU and KBQI-HD2 rebranded as "98.1 The Bull".
