= Joanie Keller =

American country music singer

- Born: Wayne, Nebraska
- Genres: Country
- Occupation: Singer
- Instrument: Guitar
- Years active: 2000–present
- Labels: Broken Bow

Joanie Keller (born in Wayne, Nebraska) is an American country music singer. Keller began performing in her father's band when she was a small child. After graduating high school, she played local clubs in Colorado before moving to Nashville to pursue a career as a country singer.

Keller's debut album, Sparks Are Gonna Fly, was released by Broken Bow Records in April 2000. Its first single, "Three Little Teardrops", peaked at number 66 on the Billboard Hot Country Singles & Tracks chart. The album received a mixed review from Joel Bernstein of Country Standard Time, who wrote that "it's too smooth and polished to grab the hard-core honkytonkers, but it's often too country for much of today's younger audience." Carrie Attebury of about.com compared Keller favorably to Linda Davis.

Since parting ways with Broken Bow, Keller has continued to perform in Nashville with the band 45 RPM. She was inducted into the Nebraska Music Hall of Fame in 2009.

== Discography ==
=== Albums ===
Title	Album details
Sparks Are Gonna Fly	Release date: April 11, 2000; Label: Broken Bow Records
It's Me Again	Release date: 2006; Label: self-released
Me and Dad	Release date: July 31, 2009; Label: Long Lil Doggie Music

=== Singles ===
Year	Single	Peak positions	Album
Year	Single	US Country	Album
2000	"Three Little Teardrops"	66	Sparks Are Gonna Fly
2003	"If Heartaches Had Wings"	—	It's Me Again
"—" denotes releases that did not chart

=== Music videos ===
Year	Video	Director
2000	"Three Little Teardrops"	chris rogers
