= BBR Music Group =

American record label

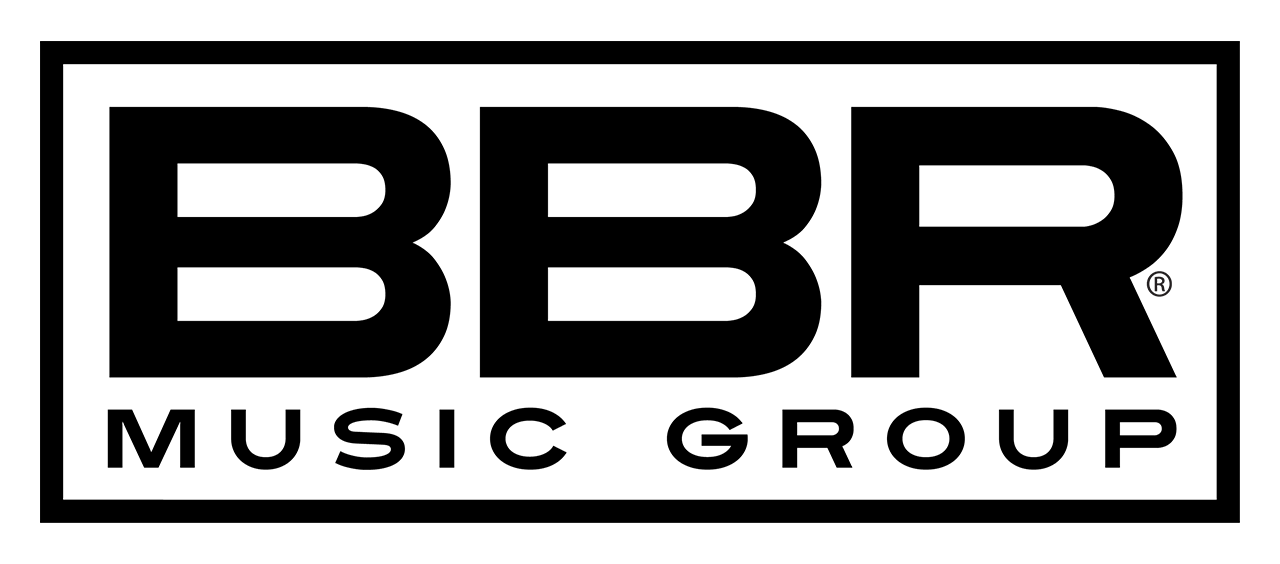
- Parent company: BMG Rights Management
- Founded: July 1999
- Founder: Benny Brown
- Distributors: Universal Music Group (physical); BMG Rights Management (digital)
- Genre: Country
- Country of origin: United States
- Location: Nashville, Tennessee
- Official website: bbrmusicgroup.com

BBR Music Group (formerly Broken Bow Records) is an American record label based in Nashville. Founded in July 1999 by Benny Brown, the label specializes in country music. The label's executive vice president is Jon Loba.

Craig Morgan had the first number-one single for the label with his 2005 hit "That's What I Love About Sunday". Jason Aldean has produced the most number-one hits for the label, with twenty-one in total.

In 2009, Broken Bow Records launched a sister label, Stoney Creek Records. In August 2015, Broken Bow launched another imprint label, Wheelhouse Records, with Trace Adkins and Granger Smith the first artists signed to it.

BBR Music Group was acquired by BMG Rights Management in February 2017.

== Artists on Broken Bow Records ==
- Jason Aldean (Macon/Broken Bow)
- Dustin Lynch
- Craig Morgan (left Broken Bow in 2008; returned in 2019)
- John Morgan
- Frank Ray
- Ryan and Rory
- Lainey Wilson

=== Previous Broken Bow artists ===
- Sherrié Austin
- Chad Brock
- Dean Brody
- Kristy Lee Cook
- Crossin Dixon (moved to Stoney Creek)
- Joe Diffie
- Everette
- Tyler Farr (Night Train/Broken Bow)
- Damon Gray
- The Great Divide
- J. Michael Harter
- Joanie Keller
- Jeff Bates
- Krista Marie (Holeshot)
- Jackie Lee
- Lila McCann
- John Anderson
- Megan Mullins (moved to Stoney Creek)
- Randy Owen
- Jordan Rager
- Chase Rice (Dack Janiels/Broken Bow)
- James Wesley
- Elbert West
- Blake Wise

=== Previous Red Bow artists ===
- Chase Bryant
- Craig Campbell (moved to Wheelhouse)
- Brooke Eden
- David Fanning (moved to Stoney Creek)
- Rachel Farley
- Joe Nichols
- Kid Rock (moved to Wheelhouse)

== Artists on Stoney Creek Records ==
- Atlus
- Drew Baldridge
- Jelly Roll
- Drake Milligan
- Parmalee
- Carly Pearce

=== Previous Stoney Creek artists ===
- Jimmie Allen
- Ash Bowers
- Crossin Dixon
- Adam Craig
- Lindsay Ell
- David Fanning
- Lanie Gardner[1]
- Randy Houser
- Naomi Cooke Johnson
- King Calaway
- Madeline Merlo
- Megan Mullins
- Thompson Square
- Track45

== Artists on Wheelhouse Records ==
- Chayce Beckham
- Brantley Gilbert
- HunterGirl
- Alexandra Kay
- Blake Shelton

=== Previous Wheelhouse artists ===
- Trace Adkins
- Blanco Brown
- Zac Brown Band
- Kristian Bush
- Craig Campbell
- Kolby Cooper
- The Frontmen
- Kid Rock
- LoCash
- Runaway June
- Dylan Schneider
- Elvie Shane
- Granger Smith
- Sykamore
- Walker McGuire

== BMG Nashville artists ==
- Jade Eagleson
- Brooke Eden
- K. Michelle
- Mary Kutter
- Alexander Ludwig
- Tim McGraw
- Allison Nichols
- Collin Stough
