= List of New Mexico State Bike Routes =

The following is a list of New Mexico State Bike Routes. These routes are designated by the New Mexico Department of Transportation.

== List of routes ==
=== State Bike Route 1 ===
New Mexico State Bike Route 1
- Location: La Mesilla-San Miguel, Belen-Bernardo, Taos-Colorado border

New Mexico State Bike Route 1 exists within three separate segments. These segments connect La Mesilla and San Miguel, Belen and Bernardo, and Taos and the Colorado border.

=== State Bike Route 2 ===
New Mexico State Bike Route 2
- Location: Questa

New Mexico State Bike Route 2 runs along New Mexico State Road 38 between Questa and the end of the shoulder.

=== State Bike Route 5 ===
New Mexico State Bike Route 5
- Location: Rio Rancho-Cuba

New Mexico State Bike Route 5 runs through northwestern New Mexico, connecting Rio Rancho to Cuba along New Mexico State Road 528 and U.S. Route 550.

=== State Bike Route 7 ===
New Mexico State Bike Route 7
- Location: U.S. Route 70 in New Mexico

New Mexico State Bike Route 7 exists in four segments along U.S. Route 70 in New Mexico, running between Las Cruces and Organ, Tularosa and Hondo, within Roswell, and between Kenna and Clovis.

=== State Bike Route 9 ===
New Mexico State Bike Route 9
- Location: Stanley-Estancia, Tesuque Village-Lamy, Espanola-Ojo Caliente

New Mexico State Bike Route 9 exists within three separate segments. These segments connect Stanley and Estancia, Tesuque Village and Lamy, and Espanola and Ojo Caliente.

=== State Bike Route 9A ===
New Mexico State Bike Route 9A
- Location: Abiquiú

New Mexico State Bike Route 9A is a spur of Bike Route 9 into Abiquiú.

=== State Bike Route 12 ===
New Mexico State Bike Route 12
- Location: Tijeras

New Mexico State Bike Route 12 runs through the Manzanita Mountains on New Mexico State Road 337 near Tijeras.

=== State Bike Route 14 ===
New Mexico State Bike Route 14
- Location: Tijeras-Sandia Park

New Mexico State Bike Route 14 runs between Tijeras and Sandia Park along the Turquoise Trail.

=== State Bike Route 15 ===
New Mexico State Bike Route 15
- Location: Eastern New Mexico

New Mexico State Bike Route 15 exists in four segments in eastern New Mexico. The segments run between Carlsbad and Roswell, Fort Sumner and Santa Rosa, Las Vegas and Sapello, and Black Lake and Angel Fire.

=== State Bike Route 18 ===
New Mexico State Bike Route 18
- Location: Cliff-Deming

New Mexico State Bike Route 18 runs from Cliff to Deming along U.S. Route 180.

=== State Bike Route 20 ===
New Mexico State Bike Route 20
- Location: Anthony-Texas border

New Mexico State Bike Route 20 runs from Anthony east to the Texas border along New Mexico State Road 404 and New Mexico State Road 213.

=== State Bike Route 53 ===
New Mexico State Bike Route 53
- Location: Grants-Malpais Information Center

New Mexico State Bike Route 53 runs from Grants to Malpais Information Center along New Mexico State Road 53.

=== State Bike Route 66 ===
New Mexico State Bike Route 66
- Location: U.S. Route 66 in New Mexico

New Mexico State Bike Route 66 runs along two sections of U.S. Route 66. The segments run between Milan and New Mexico State Road 117 and Albuquerque and Tijeras.

=== State Bike Route 547 ===
New Mexico State Bike Route 547
- Location: Grants

New Mexico State Bike Route 547 runs along New Mexico State Road 547 in Grants.
