= Crossin Dixon =

American country/rock band

- Also known as: Kyote Wylde
- Origin: Mississippi, U.S.
- Genres: Country, Southern rock
- Years active: 2002–2015
- Labels: Broken Bow; Stoney Creek
- Past members: Jason Miller; Michael Bole; Brandon Hyde; Charlie Grantham
- Website: crossin-dixon.com

Crossin Dixon was an American country and Southern rock group signed to the independent Stoney Creek Records label. It was founded by Jason Miller (vocals), Michael Bole, Brandon Hyde and Charlie Grantham. They have released three singles, of which two have charted on the Billboard country charts.

== Biography ==
The four members of Crossin Dixon first performed together in 2002. Originally, they assumed the name Kyote Wylde, but after developing a significant fanbase, the band changed its name to Crossin Dixon in 2004, to reflect their widespread touring. The band was recommended to record producer Michael Knox, who had also worked with Jason Aldean, and by 2006, Crossin Dixon was signed to Broken Bow Records. Their first single, entitled "Guitar Slinger", was released to radio in July 2007; both it and the followup, "Make You Mine", charted on the Hot Country Songs charts that year. They released a third single, "I Love My Old Bird Dog (& I Love You Too)" in 2008, but the single failed to chart. Their self-titled debut was released digitally on December 16, 2008. They released a single called "Lovin in the Country" to radio and on August 31, 2010, as the first single for an upcoming, untitled second album. A new single, "Goodbye to Henry", was released on December 6, 2010, but it failed to chart.

Crossin Dixon took a brief hiatus in 2012 following the announcement of former singer, Jason Miller, to pursue a solo career. After careful thought and consideration for their fans, the two remaining members of Crossin Dixon, Brandon Hyde and Charlie Grantham, decided they would continue their tour starting in January 2013. The band broke up sometime in 2015, without making much noise or a formal announcement.

== Discography ==
=== Crossin Dixon (2008) ===
Crossin Dixon

Studio album by Crossin Dixon
- Released: November 18, 2008
- Genre: Country
- Length: 38:53
- Label: Broken Bow
- Producer: Michael Knox

Track listing

1. "Guitar Slinger" (Rodney Clawson, Jon Stone, Bob DiPiero) - 3:23
2. "Don't Give Up on Me" (Lee Brice, Garrett Parris, Kyle Jacobs) - 3:37
3. "Stomp" (Clawson, Blair Daly, John Rich) - 3:07
4. "Don't Waste Your Pretty" (Willie Mack, Giles Godard) - 2:49
5. "Let the Bad Times Roll" (Brett James, Hillary Lindsey, Troy Verges, Blair Daly) - 3:42
6. "Nineteen" (Jeffrey Steele, Gary Nicholson, Tom Hambridge) - 3:09
7. "Make You Mine" (Clawson, Stone) - 3:52
8. "I Love My Old Bird Dog (& I Love You)" (Bill Luther, James) - 4:09
9. "I Can Try" (Dave Berg, George Teren) - 3:06
10. "Moonshine and Mountain Dew" (Chris Tompkins, Josh Kear, Mark Irwin) - 3:13
11. "Just Look What You've Done" (James, John Bettis) - 4:46

=== Singles ===
Year	Single	Peak positions	Album
Year	Single	US Country	Album
2007	"Guitar Slinger"	45	Crossin' Dixon
2007	"Make You Mine"	47	Crossin' Dixon
2008	"I Love My Old Bird Dog (& I Love You)"	—	Crossin' Dixon
2010	"Lovin' in the Country"	—	Non-album songs
2010	"Goodbye to Henry"	—	Non-album songs
"—" denotes releases that did not chart

=== Music videos ===
Year	Video	Director
2007	"Guitar Slinger"	Wes Edwards
2008	"I Love My Old Bird Dog (& I Love You)"	Wes Edwards
2010	"Lovin' in the Country"	Jeffrey C. Phillips
