= KABQ-FM =

Radio station in Corrales–Albuquerque, New Mexico

Coordinates: 35.068°N 106.780°W

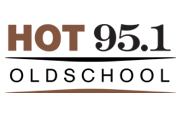

Corrales, New Mexico; United States
- Broadcast area: Albuquerque, New Mexico
- Frequency: 95.1 MHz (HD Radio)
- Branding: Hot 95.1

Programming
- Format: Rhythmic oldies
- Subchannels: HD2: Bluegrass music

Ownership
- Owner: iHeartMedia, Inc.; (iHM Licenses, LLC)
- Sister stations: KABQ, KBQI, KPEK, KTEG, KZRR, K251AU, K265CA

History
- First air date: 1995
- Former call signs: KSVA (1989–1999); KSYU (1999–2010); KLQT (2010–2016); KOLZ (2016–2021)
- Call sign meaning: Albuquerque

Technical information
- Licensing authority: FCC
- Facility ID: 39265
- Class: C1
- ERP: 100,000 watts
- HAAT: 132 meters (433 ft)

Links
- Public license information: Public file; LMS
- Webcast: Listen Live
- Website: Hot 95.1

KABQ-FM (95.1 FM) is a commercial radio station located in Corrales, New Mexico, United States, broadcasting to the Albuquerque area. It broadcasts at full power from a tower atop Nine Mile Hill west of Albuquerque, with studios located in Northeast Albuquerque and is owned by iHeartMedia, Inc. (formerly Clear Channel Communications).

KABQ-FM airs a rhythmic oldies format branded as "Hot 95.1" featuring Hip hop, R&B, and some dance-pop from the 1980s to 2000s. The format started on January 2, 2014, on translator K265CA (100.9 FM), branded as "Hot 100.9". On November 3, 2014, the format moved to the then-KLQT. The station was jockless for the first year, but now features former A Lighter Shade of Brown member "ODM" in morning drive and local personality Janae Martinez in afternoon drive.

KABQ-FM broadcasts in HD.

== History ==
=== Religious: 1995-1999 ===
The 95.1 frequency was originally LifeTalk Radio affiliate KSVA (now at 920 AM) when it signed on in 1995.

=== Adult contemporary: 1999-2002 ===
In 1999, after Clear Channel bought the station from Trumper Communications, they would target Albuquerque as an adult contemporary outlet as KSYU ("Sunny 95.1"); the format would adapt a rhythmic lean to it, described as "warm rhythms."

=== Urban adult contemporary: 2002-2009 ===
After airing an all Christmas music format throughout December in 2002, they would flip to an urban adult contemporary format branded as "Hot 95.1" that was patterned after sister station KHHT in Los Angeles on January 1, 2003. Its slogan and format definition was "Old School and Today's R&B". Local morning personalities included Chaz Malibu from 2003 to 2006 and Big Benny from 2007 to 2009 (both are now at KABG). Unlike the current format, this version of "Hot" did not play hip-hop, and featured a more down-tempo format of mostly R&B hits centered around the 1970s and 1980s, and also featured current hits.

=== Rhythmic adult contemporary: 2009-2010 ===
On May 1, 2009, KSYU switched directions from Urban AC to an upbeat Dance-flavored rhythmic adult contemporary direction, using the same musical approach as their sister stations in New York, Philadelphia, Miami and Ft. Myers, as "The All New 95-1 - Move To The Music."

=== Adult contemporary: 2010-2012 ===
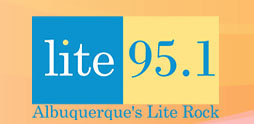
Logo from 2010 to 2012

On May 4, 2010, after a year with the rhythmic AC format, KSYU changed their format to adult contemporary, branded as "Lite 95.1" and on May 5, 2010, changed calls to KLQT. The final song as "95-1" was "Last Dance" by Donna Summer, while the first song on "Lite" was "Nothing's Gonna Stop Us Now" by Starship. KLQT went head-on with Cumulus Media's KMGA for listeners. The station offered "commercial free Mondays", in which the station did not air commercials for 24 hours. During November and December, it aired holiday music. Despite all this, "Lite" drew very low Arbitron ratings and did not seem to have any impact on the long established KMGA.

=== Top 40: 2012-2014 ===
On May 16, 2012, at Noon, KLQT changed their format to contemporary hits, branded as "Channel 95.1". The final song on "Lite" was "End of the Road" by Boyz II Men, while the first song on "Channel" was "Starships" by Nicki Minaj. This added to a crowded field of contemporary pop stations in the Albuquerque market with KLQT competing directly with Cumulus Media's KKOB-FM (which has aired the format since late 2002), as well as American General Media's KDLW. There are also two Rhythmic Contemporary stations in the market as well; the long running KKSS from Univision and American General Media's KAGM, and bilingual Latin CHR KKRG-FM, which flipped to classic hip-hop in September 2015.

Personalities on "Channel" were mostly syndicated by Clear Channel to its various stations airing the CHR format. It featured Johnjay and Rich from KZZP in Phoenix in morning drive, JoJo Wright, Billy the Kidd and Sisanie. On Air with Ryan Seacrest moved from KKOB-FM in May 2013 and was featured in middays. "Channel" had only one local personality in afternoons. The format had very low ratings, finishing last in a three way CHR battle, with KKOB-FM continuing to be the market leader in the format, while KDLW had undergone a transformation in April 2013 from "OMG! 106.7" to "Z106.3", and performing only slightly better than KLQT.

=== Rhythmic oldies: 2014-present ===
On November 3, 2014, at Midnight, after stunting with a 24-hour loop of "Bye Bye Bye" by *NSYNC, KLQT flipped to rhythmic oldies and returned to the "Hot 95.1" moniker; the format and name moving over from 100.9 FM. 95.1 and 100.9 simulcasted until January 12, 2015, when K265CA debuted an urban contemporary format.

On March 30, 2016, KLQT changed their call letters to KOLZ.

K265CA/KLQT/KOLZ had mostly competed with KKRG-FM, which had launched shortly after the format's debut in early 2014. That station was owned by Univision Radio, and the two stations were often head-to-head in the ratings, although in low numbers. Following American General Media's acquisition of KKRG, the station dropped the format on October 31, 2017, making KOLZ the only station in the market with this format.

On May 31, 2021, KOLZ changed their call letters to KABQ-FM; the calls were on what is now KNFZ upon that station's divestment to the Delmarva Educational Association the previous month. Concurrently, the KOLZ call letters moved to sister KAZX in Farmington.
