= KBNM-LP =

Radio station in Belen, New Mexico

- Belen, New Mexico; United States
- Frequency: 98.7 MHz
- Branding: Eagle 98

Programming
- Format: Oldies

Ownership
- Owner: Tixs For Kids

History
- First air date: 2006
- Call sign meaning: Belen New Mexico

Technical information
- Licensing authority: FCC
- Facility ID: 133409
- Class: L1
- ERP: 100 watts
- HAAT: -6.8 meters
- Transmitter coordinates: 34°39′54″N 106°45′55″W

Links
- Public license information: LMS
- Webcast: Listen live
- Website: eagle987belen.com

KBNM-LP (98.7 FM, "Eagle 98") is a low-powered FM radio station based in Belen, New Mexico broadcasting at 100 watts. KBNM airs an oldies music format. It is owned by Tix For Kids, a non-profit group that raises money to buy tickets to concerts and other events for sick children.

KBNM streams its signal over the internet from its website.

It had also broadcast to Albuquerque on 10 watt translator K251AU 98.1 FM from January 2007 until May 2013. However, in April 2013 the translator was sold to Clear Channel and upgraded to 165 watts and now re-broadcasts an HD subchannel of KBQI.
