= KTEG =

Alternative rock radio station in Santa Fe, New Mexico

- Santa Fe, New Mexico; United States
- Broadcast area: Albuquerque, New Mexico Santa Fe and Northern New Mexico
- Frequency: 104.1 MHz (HD Radio)
- Branding: 104-1 The Edge

Programming
- Format: Alternative rock
- Subchannels: HD2: Dance Nation 90s (90s Dance hits)
- Affiliations: Compass Media Networks; Premiere Networks

Ownership
- Owner: iHeartMedia, Inc.; (iHM Licenses, LLC)
- Sister stations: KABQ, KABQ-FM, KBQI, KPEK, KZRR, K251AU, K265CA

History
- First air date: January 1984 (as KLSK)
- Former call signs: KLSK (1983–2002); KBAC (2002–2003); KABQ-FM (2003–2007)
- Call sign meaning: "The Edge"

Technical information
- Licensing authority: FCC
- Facility ID: 53652
- Class: C
- ERP: 100,000 watts
- HAAT: 572 meters (1,877 ft)
- Transmitter coordinates: 35°46′50″N 106°31′35″W

Links
- Public license information: Public file; LMS
- Webcast: HD1: Listen Live; HD2: Listen Live (Dance Nation 90s)
- Website: 1041theedge.iheart.com

KTEG (104.1 FM, "The Edge") is a radio station broadcasting an alternative rock format. Licensed to Santa Fe, New Mexico, it serves the Albuquerque, Santa Fe and Northern New Mexico metropolitan area. The station is currently owned by iHeartMedia, Inc. (formerly Clear Channel Communications). Its studios are located in Northeast Albuquerque and the transmitter tower is located west of Los Alamos, New Mexico.

KTEG is licensed by the FCC to broadcast in the HD digital format.

The HD2 subchannel carries 1990s Dance Hits known as "Dance Nation 90s."

== History of 104.1 FM ==
=== Classical: 1984-1990 ===
This station first began broadcasting in January 1984 under the call sign KLSK with a classical music format that would later feature various other forms of music such as jazz, new age, folk and world music.

=== New age: 1990-1991 ===
In February 1990, KLSK would be sold to Progressive Broadcasting co-owned by programmer John Sebastian for $2 million. The station's format would then be focused mostly on new age music with the other genres being phased out. The effort only lasted a few months.

=== Classic rock: 1991-2002 ===
On January 23, 1991, KLSK would stunt with a loop of Led Zeppelin's "Stairway to Heaven" for 24 hours. The next day, it would launch a classic rock format, becoming the first station in Albuquerque to feature that format full-time. The station would quickly rise to the top 5 in the ratings and would do well for few years. In June 1993, Progressive Broadcasting would merge with Sandia Peak Broadcasters, which was a subsidiary of TV broadcaster Anchor Media, owners of KZRR and simulcast KZSS, and would become "Twin Peaks Radio", with studios on San Pedro NE north of Menual. Anchor Media was acquired by River City Broadcasting about a year later, and River City inherited the radio stations in Albuquerque. Despite expanding further into radio by buying Keymarket Communications, the Albuquerque stations were told to Trumper Communications in 1996, which had recently acquired KTEG and KHTZ and two AM stations from Bengal Communications. By the mid-1990s, KLSK would see a great deal of competition from other stations, most notably KIOT. Several programming changes would take place over the years, including re-branding as "Eagle 104" in 1998. The classic rock format on 104.1 ended in late June 2002, and was moved to 98.1 FM in Santa Fe. The long-time KLSK call sign was first moved to the Las Vegas station vacated by KBAC, but was dropped when the KBAC calls were moved back. They are now being used on an FM station in Great Falls, Montana.

=== Adult album alternative (AAA): 2002-2005 ===
Clear Channel had attempted to do Adult Album Alternative on this frequency when they had moved Santa Fe's KBAC to 104.1 in 2002. That station started out with an eclectic format, but attempts to make changes came at the protest of Santa Fe listeners which would result in KBAC moving back to Santa Fe and a more mainstream version of AAA called "World Class Rock" would launch on 104.1 under the new callsign KABQ-FM in late 2003, only to generate similar results.

=== Hispanic rhythmic: 2005-2006 ===
In February 2005, the station changed to a Hispanic Rhythmic format branded as "Mega 104.1", which played hip-hop and reggaeton and was patterned after sister station KLOL in Houston. The station also featured local personalities, including Big Benny (now at KABG 98.5) in mornings. The format, however, was not a strong competitor in the market.

=== Smooth jazz: 2006-2007 ===
On September 29, 2006, 104.1 switched to a Smooth Jazz format programmed by satellite by Broadcast Architecture. On December 13, 2007, the format moved to 104.7, with KTEG moving to 104.1.

From 1986 until August 2013, programming on 104.1 was also heard in Albuquerque on translator K265CA (100.9 FM), which had broadcast at 50 watts from atop Sandia Crest. The translator now runs at 250 watts and relays KZRR's HD-2 subchannel.

=== Alternative rock: 2007-present ===
On December 13, 2007, at 7:30 a.m., KTEG and its alternative rock format moved to 104.1 FM. Reasons cited on air for the frequency swap are the stronger signal in the Albuquerque market and the Santa Fe, New Mexico, area.

== KTEG history ==
=== 1994 - 2000 ===
KTEG launched in October 1994 on the 107.9 frequency (the upper edge of the commercial FM band) with an Alternative rock format that was reaching its peak popularity at that time. It was also active in the local live music scene, bringing more all-ages shows to town, but particularly with its annual "Edgefest" that began in summer 1995. The first two festivals featured mostly obscure line ups such as the band Cake, which played the first festival but was little-known at the time. The Edgefest line-up had gotten stronger in 1997 and in the following years. Some of the bands that would play Edgefest over the years would include The Mighty Mighty Bosstones, Marcy Playground, Everclear, Our Lady Peace, Fuel, Limp Bizkit, Kid Rock, Smash Mouth, Nickelback, Incubus, Staind, and P.O.D. The Edge had also been one of the few local stations to support local bands which would also be part of Edgefest. By the end of the 1990s, KTEG's format had started to shift from anything labeled 'alternative rock' to harder music due to changing trends in modern rock radio at the time, as well as to differentiate from its sister station KPEK, which had a modern adult contemporary format whose playlist at the time was featuring many of the same titles and artists as KTEG. It was purchased by Clear Channel in 1999 from Trumper Communications.

=== 2000 - 2007 ===
In the summer of 2000, KTEG would move to the 104.7 frequency which Clear Channel had purchased from Continental Communications and previously had a Regional Mexican format as KEXT-FM ("Radio Exitos") to make way for a new country music station on the 107.9 frequency to challenge KRST-FM. In a way, this marked a new era for the station, which was now playing heavier rock music from bands that it had not previously played, including Metallica and Pantera, while dropping bands such as U2 and No Doubt that were frequently heard on the old format. The Edge had sponsored Ozzfest, which usually made its way to Albuquerque each summer, as well as the Family Values Tour.

=== 2007 - 2009 ===
On December 13, 2007, at 7:30 a.m., the station relocated to 104.1 FM. It was part of a frequency swap with Smooth Jazz clustermate KABQ-FM. KTEG was part of the Active rock airplay panel since its playlist consisted mostly of harder rock artists such as Korn, Godsmack, Disturbed, and Slipknot.

=== 2009 - present ===
April 2009 brought many changes to "The Edge", with the loss of midday jock Ralphie, evening jock Sloppy Joe (who voicetracked from California) and all local weekend air staff in favor of national programming from Premium Choice's "The Alternative Project". On weekdays, the midday slot and overnight slot are filled with The Alternative Project programming, while the remainder of the day is for local talent. The music in the evening comes from The Alternative Project, but since the Sixx Sense with Nikki Sixx already airs on sister station KZRR, voiceovers are replaced with a local jock. All weekend programming is The Alternative Project. At the same time, The Edge made a substantial change in the station's programming, going from playing "harder" music, like Slipknot, Korn, and Metallica to contemporary pop artists like Mumford and Sons, Kings Of Leon, Foo Fighters and many 1990s acts, such as Bush, The Toadies, and The Offspring. These changes have proven controversial for many listeners; however, the station had seen a rise in ratings since the format changes were made.

On May 5, 2015, iHeartMedia dismissed morning duo "Buck & Dex", who had been hosting mornings on the station since December 2003, as part of a "reorganizing" of the station. Fans of the show had taken to social media to protest this move. Morning co-host Baxter remained on the air, and was joined by co-hosts Orio and Janae, who is also on sister station KOLZ. The station has also changed its logo.

On August 25, 2017, the local morning show was replaced by The Woody Show from KYSR in Los Angeles. Baxter took over the afternoon shift, while Orio and Janae (who remains with KOLZ) exited.
