= KVSF-FM =

Radio station in Pecos, New Mexico

Coordinates: 35.583°N 105.777°W

- Pecos, New Mexico; United States
- Broadcast area: Pecos–Glorieta–Santa Fe
- Frequency: 101.5 MHz
- Branding: 101.5 The Cat

Programming
- Format: Jazz

Ownership
- Owner: Hutton Broadcasting, LLC
- Sister stations: KVSF, KBAC, KLBU, KQBA, KTRC

History
- First air date: August 2004
- Former call signs: KOOT (2002–2004, CP); KWRP (2004–2007)
- Call sign meaning: Voice of Santa Fe

Technical information
- Licensing authority: FCC
- Facility ID: 83285
- Class: C3
- ERP: 25,000 watts
- HAAT: -28 meters

Links
- Public license information: Public file; LMS
- Webcast: Listen live
- Website: santafe.com/radio_stations/101-5-the-cat-kvsf-fm

KVSF-FM (101.5 FM, "101.5 The Cat") is a radio station in Pecos, New Mexico, broadcasting to the Santa Fe, New Mexico, area. KVSF-FM is owned by Hutton Broadcasting, LLC. Its studios are located in Santa Fe, and its transmitter is located in Glorieta, New Mexico.

The Cat features a mix of classic and modern jazz along with vocal standards. Richard Eeds hosts mornings. Nacha Mendez hosts from 11am to 3pm and KBAC's Ira G is on from 3-7pm.

== History ==
This station went on the air in August 2004 as KWRP. The station featured a format consisting of a variety of music and was owned by Yellow Dog Radio. On July 1, 2006 KWRP switched to a modern rock/adult alternative and Americana hybrid music format not typical of other radio stations branding as "Indie 101.5". The playlist was extensive consisting of a larger music library than most other modern rock and adult album alternative radio stations. The format was programmed by its disc jockeys airing less mainstream independent artists. This station was operated by Broadcast Partners LLC under a "Time Brokerage Agreement" or "LMA" with Yellow Dog Radio. KWRP was sold to Hutton Broadcasting and changed to KVSF-FM in late June 2007

KVSF shifted to the "Project 101.5" branding on July 1, 2007. The format consisted of rock and pop music from 1965 to today. Its modern selections included rock that fell under the "AAA" format. This format was a successor to "High Altitude Rock" a AAA format that aired on American General Media owned 94.7 (then KBOM) from September 2006 until June 2007.

On April 13, 2013 KVSF-FM changed their format to news/talk, branded as "The Voice". The Voice's weekday line-up featured local host Richard Eeds in the mornings from 7-11AM. Local journalist Julia Goldberg hosted the Friday midday show. Sean Hannity, Alan Colmes, The Melissa Ethridge Show, Free Talk Live and Coast to Coast AM were among the syndicated programs carried by the station. Other time slots featured different programs each day as well as a variety of shows on the weekends. Local shows covered everything from business, real estate, art, dining, health, sex, music, entertainment, local politics and more. Music sometimes aired in between shows. Top of the hour news updates came from NBC News Radio.

On September 15, 2017, KVSF-FM changed their format from talk to jazz, branded as "101.5 The Cat". Richard Eeds local talk show moved to afternoons on KTRC/K279CX although he also remains in mornings on KVSF-FM.
