= KQBA =

Radio station in Los Alamos, New Mexico

Coordinates: 36.089°N 106.029°W

- Los Alamos, New Mexico; United States
- Broadcast area: Northern New Mexico
- Frequency: 107.5 MHz
- Branding: 107.5 Outlaw Country

Programming
- Format: Country

Ownership
- Owner: Hutton Broadcasting
- Sister stations: KBAC, KLBU, KTRC, KVSF, KVSF-FM

History
- Call sign meaning: Former Qué Buena format

Technical information
- Licensing authority: FCC
- Facility ID: 35534
- Class: C1
- ERP: 100,000 watts
- HAAT: 243 meters (797 ft)

Links
- Public license information: Public file; LMS
- Webcast: Listen Live
- Website: santafe.com/radio_stations/107-5-outlaw-country-kqba

KQBA (107.5 MHz, "Outlaw Country") is a commercial FM radio station licensed to Los Alamos, New Mexico, and serving the Santa Fe area and northern New Mexico. It is owned by Hutton Broadcasting and has a country music radio format. Its studios are in Santa Fe, and its transmitter is in Alcalde, New Mexico.

The songs on Outlaw are "tagged" with an automated voice identifying the year the song was released as well as artist and song title information at the end of each song. KQBA has previously had a Regional Mexican format as "Que Buena" from 2000 to 2003 and "Radio Lobo" (identical to 97.7 KLVO in Albuquerque) from late 2003-early 2006. KQBA also had a rock format as "K-Rock" for most of 2003 before returning to Regional Mexican.
