= KBAC =

Coordinates: 35.372°N 105.368°W

- Las Vegas, New Mexico; United States
- Broadcast area: Santa Fe, New Mexico
- Frequency: 98.1 MHz
- Branding: Radio Free Santa Fe

Programming
- Format: Adult album alternative

Ownership
- Owner: Hutton Broadcasting, LLC
- Sister stations: KLBU, KQBA, KTRC, KVSF, KVSF-FM

History
- First air date: 1989

Technical information
- Licensing authority: FCC
- Facility ID: 40639
- Class: C
- ERP: 100,000 watts
- HAAT: 316 meters
- Repeater: KBAC-FM1 Santa Fe (FID 40638, 1.585 kW ERP)

Links
- Public license information: Public file; LMS
- Webcast: Listen live
- Website: santafe.com/radio_stations/98-1-kbac-radio-free-santa-fe/

KBAC (98.1 FM, "Radio Free Santa Fe") is a commercial radio station located in Santa Fe, New Mexico, broadcasting to the area of Santa Fe, New Mexico. KBAC airs an adult album alternative music format.

KBAC has a more eclectic playlist than other commercial adult album alternative radio stations, airing a wide range of music from blues, acoustic, reggae, jazz, alternative, world music, and is owned by Hutton Broadcasting. Its studios are in Santa Fe, and its transmitter is located south-west of Las Vegas, New Mexico (its city of license).

== History ==
KBAC first signed on in November 1989 as "98.1 The Wave" with a satellite-delivered format that featured a blend of soft rock, light jazz, and new-age music. The station would add a local morning show with a shift in programming in September 1990, as well as translator K288CX at 105.5 to cover the Albuquerque area. By April 1991, the "wave" format was dropped and shifted to an alternative rock format mostly focused on new wave and post-punk music. The station would also shift to local programming under program director Dwight Loop. Later, Armida Santa Cruz assumed programming duties, and the station focused more on new and experimental alternative rock music, reaching a new level of popularity in the early 1990s. However, in March 1994, Santa Cruz and the entire KBAC airstaff were fired when management claimed the format had become "too hard-edged to be sellable". KBAC would be changed to a satellite-delivered soft music format, but by July 1994, the station would go dark.

=== Radio Free Santa Fe ===
KBAC would return to the air in late 1995 with a triple-a format as "Radio Free Santa Fe". Ira Gordon, formerly of KBCO in Denver, would join the station as program director and general manager. Gordon developed the format based on local research and would focus on being a local community based station. Honey Harris would also be one of the first personalities in the new format. KBAC was purchased by Clear Channel in September 2000 but could continue running its eclectic format. On June 28, 2002, Clear Channel moved KBAC to the 104.1 frequency, which made the station more easily available in Albuquerque. However, Clear Channel was not impressed with the results and added more classic rock tracks to the format, attempting to get better ratings in Albuquerque. This also got complaints from its long-time listeners, and in late 2003, KBAC moved back to 98.1. Clear Channel had moved the classic rock format that had previously been on 104.1 (KLSK-FM) to 98.1 until KBAC returned. KBAC has had translators in Albuquerque in the past but it can no longer be heard in Albuquerque. Since 2007, the 98.1 frequency in Albuquerque has been home to translator K251AU, making it nearly impossible to pick up KBAC there.

Clear Channel sold KBAC to the Christian broadcaster Educational Media Foundation in March 2007. The employees had attempted to buy the station from EMF, but on May 23, 2007, it was purchased by Hutton Broadcasting which had just purchased KWRP 101.5 and KLBU 102.9. The station's format is not likely to change under the new ownership. KBAC has been locally programmed since 1989 and involved with the local community. EMF has also purchased KSFQ 101.1 "The Cat" FM, which had a smooth jazz format but had switched to simulcasting the public radio format from KSFR 90.7. 101.1 became the new home of KSFR, while EMF took ownership of 90.7 (now KQLV) and moved it into Albuquerque.

On February 1, 2019, Ira Gordon retired from the station after 23 years. Chris Diestler now programs the station.
