= KABQ (AM) =

Coordinates: 35°06′02″N 106°40′34″W

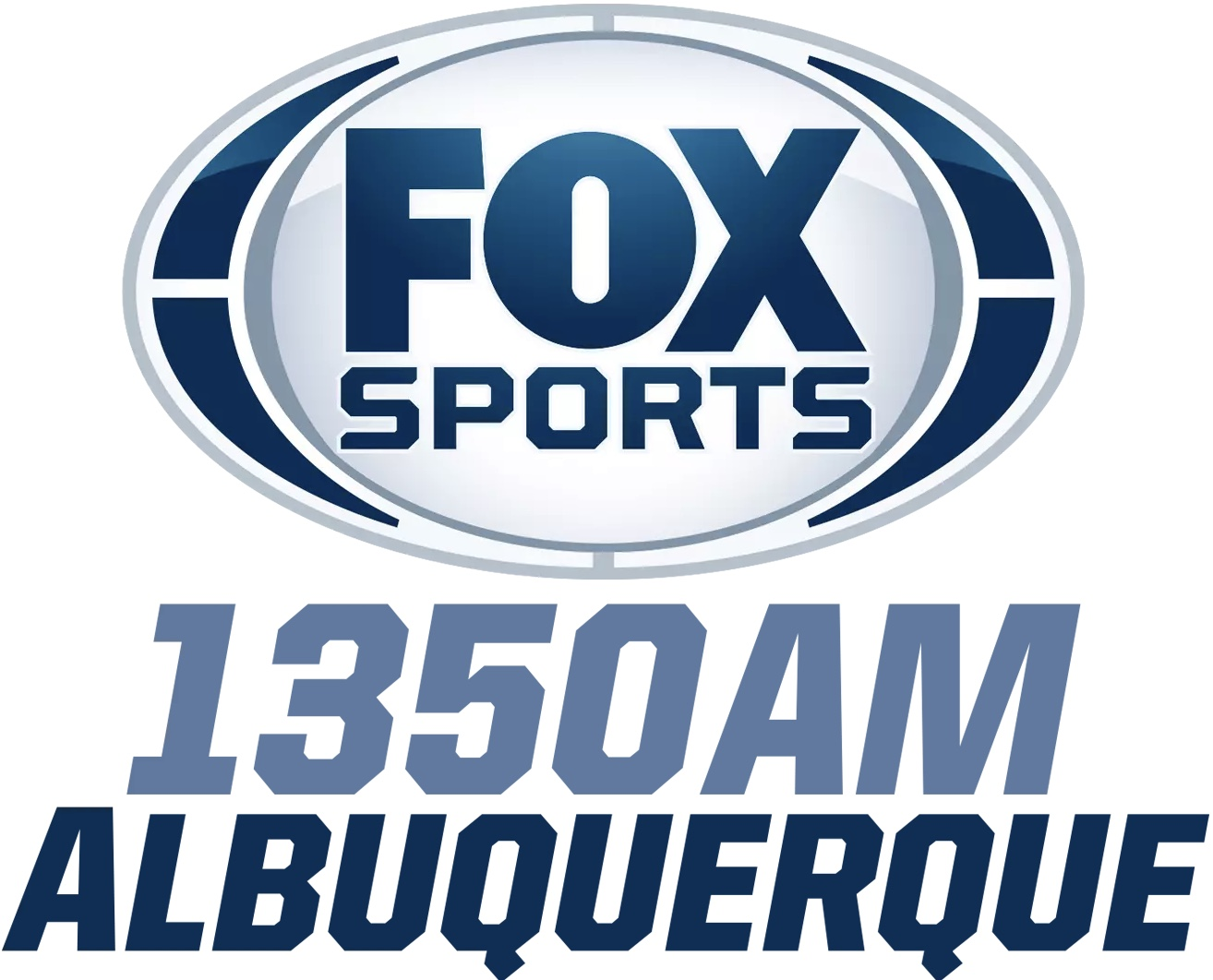
- Albuquerque, New Mexico; United States
- Broadcast area: Albuquerque metropolitan area
- Frequency: 1350 kHz
- Branding: Fox Sports 1350

Programming
- Format: Sports
- Affiliations: Fox Sports Radio

Ownership
- Owner: iHeartMedia, Inc.; (iHM Licenses, LLC)
- Sister stations: KABQ-FM, KBQI, KPEK, KTEG, KZRR, K251AU, K265CA

History
- First air date: 1947 (as KVER at 1490)
- Former call signs: KVER (1947–1959)
- Former frequencies: 1490 kHz (1947–1949); 1340 kHz (1949–1959)
- Call sign meaning: Albuquerque; "ABQ" is also the airport code for the Sunport

Technical information
- Licensing authority: FCC
- Facility ID: 65394
- Class: B
- Power: 5,000 watts (day); 500 watts (night)

Links
- Public license information: Public file; LMS
- Webcast: Listen Live
- Website: foxsportsabq.iheart.com

KABQ (1350 kHz) is a commercial AM radio station in Albuquerque, New Mexico. It is owned by iHeartMedia, Inc., and is airing a sports radio format as "Fox Sports 1350". It had been carrying all iHeart podcasts since 2019.

KABQ's radio studios and offices are on NE Jefferson Street in Albuquerque. The transmitter is located off NW Montoya Street, also in Albuquerque. KABQ is powered at 5,000 watts by day using a non-directional antenna. To avoid interfering with other stations on AM 1350, it reduces power at night to 500 watts and uses a directional antenna, with a three-tower array.

== History ==
=== KVER ===
In 1947, the station signed on as KVER at 1490 kHz. It was owned by Intermountain Broadcasting and was powered at only 250 watts. KVER was a network affiliate of the Mutual Broadcasting System.

The station moved to 1340 kHz in 1949. An advertisement in the 1950 edition of the Broadcasting Yearbook said 1340 KVER is "The choice on the dial for Albuquerque." It listed KVER's programming as drama (including programs from MGM and Mutual), sports and live events, as well as Spanish-language programming, reminding readers that over 50% of Albuquerque residents speak Spanish.

In 1956, the station was acquired by Duke Broadcasting. It became a full-time Spanish-language radio station.

=== KABQ ===
In 1959, the station was acquired by Sadia Broadcasting and moved to 1350 kHz, as KABQ. The move allowed it to increase its power to its current 5,000 watts by day and 500 watts at night. The station continued to serve the Mexican-American community. In 1972, the station was acquired by the Albuquerque Corporation.

In March 2000, Clear Channel Communications, a forerunner of today's iHeartMedia, acquired the radio station. The Spanish-language format continued until Fall of 2002 when Clear Channel switched the format to sports radio, using the Fox Sports Radio Network. All local personalities on the station were let go.

=== Progressive Talk ===
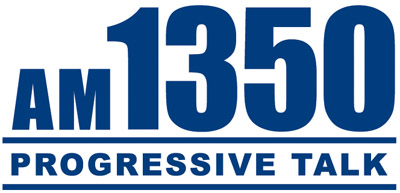
KABQ logo from 2004-2019

In late August 2004, KABQ became a full-time affiliate of Air America Radio, carrying that network's line up of liberal hosts, including Al Franken, Rachel Maddow, Chuck D, Randi Rhodes, Marc Maron and Janeane Garofalo. The station would be branded as Albuquerque's Progressive Talk.

In 2007, Clear Channel Communications placed this station, along with 104.7 KABQ-FM, into the Aloha Station Trust to comply with Federal Communications Commission limitations. Clear Channel was over the FCC limit for the number of radio stations it could own in one radio market. However, AM 1350 KABQ has returned into the iHeartMedia portfolio.

In 2010, the Air America Network discontinued its broadcasts after the parent company declared bankruptcy. The station continued its progressive talk format using programs from other networks, including several hosts who originally were with Air America. In May 2014 both Ed Schultz and Randi Rhodes, who had the longest running programs on the station, had ended their shows. Thom Hartmann, who had been heard in PM drive time, took over Schultz's midday time slot while Leslie Marshall moved to early afternoons. Norman Goldman replaced Rhodes in late afternoons.

In the final years it carried nationally syndicated shows from Stephanie Miller (aired in mornings and afternoons), Thom Hartmann (middays and nights), Norman Goldman and Clark Howard. On weekends, syndicated shows include Kim Komando, Bill Handel on the Law, Ring of Fire Radio and repeats of weekday shows. World and national news was supplied by Westwood One News.

The station had generated decent ratings for a 5 kW AM station high up the dial and was usually ranked the second most listened to commercial talk radio station in the market behind 770 KKOB, owned by Cumulus Media.

=== All Podcasts ===
In May 2019, the station switched to an all-podcast format with little warning (to the point where radio news website RadioInsight didn't report the change until July 9, nearly a month and a half after the flip). It had been the longest-running progressive talk station in the country at 15 years. The station began utilizing programming that iHeartMedia gained from its purchase of provider Stuff Media in 2018.

On November 22, 2021, KABQ dropped its all-podcast format and began stunting with Christmas music, branded as "Santa 1350".

=== Fox Sports 1350 ===
On January 3, 2022, the station flipped to sports as "Fox Sports 1350".
