= KVSF (AM) =

Santa Fe, New Mexico; United States
- Broadcast area: Santa Fe, New Mexico
- Frequency: 1400 kHz

Programming
- Format: Sports
- Affiliations: ESPN Radio

Ownership
- Owner: Hutton Broadcasting, LLC
- Sister stations: KVSF-FM, KBAC, KTRC, KQBA, KLBU

History
- First air date: February 20, 1947

Technical information
- Licensing authority: FCC
- Facility ID: 59101
- Class: C
- Power: 1,000 watts unlimited
- Transmitter coordinates: 35°40′56″N 105°58′21″W
- Translator: 93.7 K249FB (Santa Fe)

Links
- Public license information: Public file; LMS
- Website: santafe.com/radio_stations/1400-espn-santa-fe/

KVSF (1400 AM) is a radio station licensed to Santa Fe, New Mexico, United States. The station serves the Santa Fe area and is currently owned by Hutton Broadcasting, LLC. It is an affiliate of ESPN Radio. Its studios and transmitter are located in Santa Fe.

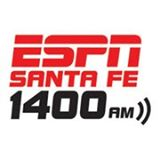
Former logo

Hutton Broadcasting had a construction permit to move translator K291BC from Truth or Consequences to Santa Fe to broadcast this station on the FM band at 97.7. The translator was licensed as K249FB effective February 21, 2018, and then moved to 93.7 FM as K229DU effective October 12, 2021.
