= Belen, New Mexico =

Belén, New Mexico
- City
- Flag Seal
- Nicknames: The Hub City, B-Town
- Location of Belen, New Mexico

- Location in the United States
- Coordinates: 34°39′46″N 106°46′35″W
- Country: United States
- State: New Mexico
- County: Valencia
- Settled: 1740
- Incorporated: 1918

Government
  - Type: Mayor-Council
  - Mayor: Robert Noblin"Belen City Page".

Area
  - Total: 19.08 sq mi (49.41 km^{2})
  - Land: 19.05 sq mi (49.35 km^{2})
  - Water: 0.023 sq mi (0.06 km^{2})
- Elevation: 4,810 ft (1,470 m)

Population (2020)
  - Total: 7,360
  - Density: 386.3/sq mi (149.14/km^{2})
- Demonym: Belenite
- Time zone: UTC-7 (Mountain (MST))
  - Summer (DST): UTC-6 (MDT)
- ZIP code: 87002
- Area code: 505
- FIPS code: 35-06480
- GNIS ID: 2409814
- Website: belen-nm.gov

Belén (/bəˈlɪn/; Spanish: Belén) is the second most populated city in Valencia County, New Mexico, the United States, after its county seat, Los Lunas. The population was 7,360 as of the 2020 Census.

Belén is Spanish for Bethlehem. It gained the nickname "Hub City" after the Atchison, Topeka and Santa Fe Railway completed a line through it in 1907. The city is geographically near the center of New Mexico, and is a significant transportation hub that includes access to rails, Interstate Highway 25, and air at Valencia County's only public airport.

Belén is at the southern end of the Albuquerque Metropolitan Statistical Area. The city is located 35 miles south of Albuquerque.

== History ==
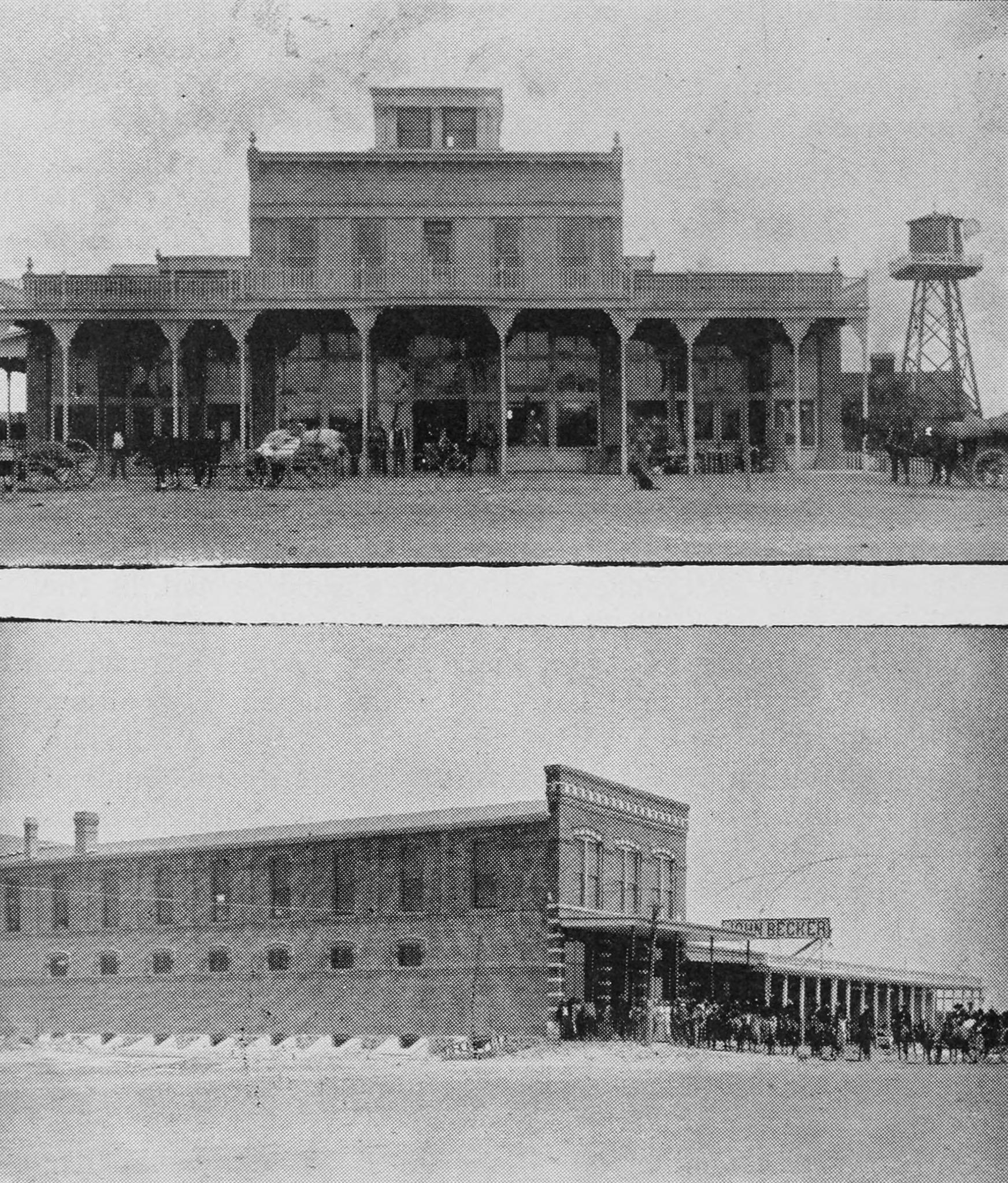
Belen, 1904

Belén was founded in 1740 as Nuestra Señora de Belén (Our Lady of Bethlehem) by a group of colonists led by Diego Torres and Antonio Salazar, who had received permission to settle the tract of land known as the Belén Grant. The early settlers in the Belén grant included several genízaro families. The genízaros, Native Americans with origins as slaves and servants of colonists, were important in the frontier defense of New Mexico. For the genízaros, relocation to Belén and other frontier settlements was a means of acquiring land. Their settlement in Belén was established to protect the southern border of the colony from Apache raiders. Belén was the first of what would be many genízaro settlements, and by 1744, 40 families were in residence. Spanish and mestizo families also settled in Belén.

Recognizing the strategic significance of Belén, Spanish authorities established a fort in Belén to protect the settlements along the Rio Grande in 1760. By the 1790s, Belén had established a city center known as Plaza Vieja, or Old Town, and had grown from a paraje, or precinct, to a partido, or district, with a population of 1,695. By 1793, a Catholic church and parish were founded.

By the middle of the 19th century, Belén had outgrown Old Town and was expanding into what became known as New Town. In 1853, the residents in both parts of town disagreed over the construction of a new Catholic church, with residents of Old Town wanting the new church to remain there, while residents of New Town wanted it built in their part of town. Ultimately, the adobe church in Old Town was abandoned, and a new church was built in New Town. In 1910, the last ruins of the former church were blown up with dynamite, and the crushed adobe was used to pave New Town's main avenue, Becker Avenue.

The residents of Valencia County spent nearly 30 years from 1846 to 1875 disputing where the county seat should be located. Valencia, north of Belén, was the county seat in 1846, followed by Peralta in 1847. Valencia reclaimed the county seat in 1849, only to lose it to Tomé in 1852. Belén captured the county seat from Tomé 20 years later but lost it to Tomé two short years later in 1874. Finally, in 1875, Los Lunas claimed the county seat and remains the county seat to this day.

In the late winter of 1862, Belén, an ally of the Union, become entangled in the Civil War when the town briefly fell under Confederate control after 400 Confederate soldiers marched into Belén. By summer, however, the Confederate army had withdrawn from New Mexico.

In 1880, the Atchison, Topeka, and Santa Fe Railway reached Belén during the construction of a rail line to El Paso. In 1884, the United States General Land Office, through the authority of President Ulysses S. Grant, established the Town of Belén. By the turn of the century, local merchant John Becker had designed a commercial and residential plan for the town. Becker's plan laid out Belén on a grid, extending from a commercial center with two grand avenues — Becker Avenue and Dalies Avenue. Originally, all of the town's streets were to be named after Spanish explorers, such as Coronado, but were quickly changed to the last names of the town's founders, such as Becker, Paul Dalies, and Charles Reinken.

In 1907, the Belén Cutoff for the Santa Fe Railway was completed, connecting Amarillo with Belén. Prior to the Belén Cutoff, trains used the steep Raton Pass on the Colorado and New Mexico border. The cutoff made it possible for many more trains to travel east and west across the United States. Facilities at Belén included a large roundhouse and a classification yard, also serving branches southward to El Paso and northward through Albuquerque to Colorado. The Belen Harvey House (now the Harvey House Museum) adjacent to the station served railroad passengers. Today, Belén remains a major refueling station for the BNSF Railway, where an average of 110 trains travel through Belén per day on the Southern Transcon.

Belén was incorporated as a municipality in 1918. It was originally designated as a village but later became a city.

In 1927, Belén native and movie stunt pilot Arthur C. Goebel took up the challenge by the Hawaii pineapple magnate James D. Dole to race with other pilots to be the first to fly nonstop from the mainland United States to the Hawaii territory. This was known as the Dole Air Race. Goebel flew the Woolaroc. Of the 13 planes that qualified, seven were lost in crashes, killing ten. Only two planes made it safely to Hawaii. Goebel landed first in Hawaii after a nonstop 26 hours, 17 minutes, and 33 seconds, receiving the top prize of $25,000.

The world's first atomic bomb, in unassembled pieces, traveled through Belén in July 1945 en route to the Trinity site at what is now White Sands Missile Range. The bomb's Belén route used old Highway 85, now Highway 314, also known as Main Street. Located in downtown Belén in 1945 was Roy's Cafe, a restaurant where military and science personnel would dine since it had the necessary security clearance. Local legend suggests personnel escorting the atomic bomb, and perhaps the bomb itself, stopped at Roy's Cafe as they passed through town.

In 1950, William F. Beavers, owner of B&B Cafe on Becker Avenue, filed the first patent for a machine that sliced potatoes into waffle-like slices, vowing to help commercialize the now-famed waffle fry in cafes across the United States. His patent was granted two years later for what he called a "slicing machine with a stationary knife and reciprocating carrier" made "for the slicing of potatoes and like foods into attractive shapes." The waffle fries could be paired with Belén's own Hub City soda pop brewed and bottled locally by the Belén Bottling Co. The soda's trademark was "Pop with Personality."

== Geography ==
According to the United States Census Bureau, the city has a total area of 4.7 square miles (12 km^{2}) of land. The city lies in the Rio Grande Valley of the Albuquerque Basin, on the west bank of the Rio Grande.

=== Climate ===
This climate type occurs primarily on the periphery of the true deserts in low-latitude semiarid steppe regions.

Climate data for Belen, New Mexico
Month	Jan	Feb	Mar	Apr	May	Jun	Jul	Aug	Sep	Oct	Nov	Dec	Year
Mean daily maximum °F (°C)	50.7 (10.4)	57.5 (14.2)	63.9 (17.7)	74.4 (23.6)	83.7 (28.7)	93.1 (33.9)	95.2 (35.1)	92.3 (33.5)	86.1 (30.1)	75.5 (24.2)	61.5 (16.4)	51.2 (10.7)	73.8 (23.2)
Mean daily minimum °F (°C)	18.6 (−7.4)	23.1 (−4.9)	29.5 (−1.4)	37.9 (3.3)	46 (8)	54.6 (12.6)	61.8 (16.6)	59.7 (15.4)	50.7 (10.4)	38.9 (3.8)	26.3 (−3.2)	19.9 (−6.7)	38.9 (3.9)
Average precipitation inches (mm)	0.3 (7.6)	0.4 (10)	0.4 (10)	0.3 (7.6)	0.3 (7.6)	0.7 (18)	1.4 (36)	1.3 (33)	0.9 (23)	1.0 (25)	0.2 (5.1)	0.5 (13)	7.6 (190)
Average precipitation days (≥ 0.01 in)	2	2	3	2	2	2	6	7	4	3	2	2	37
Source: NOAA

== Cityscape ==
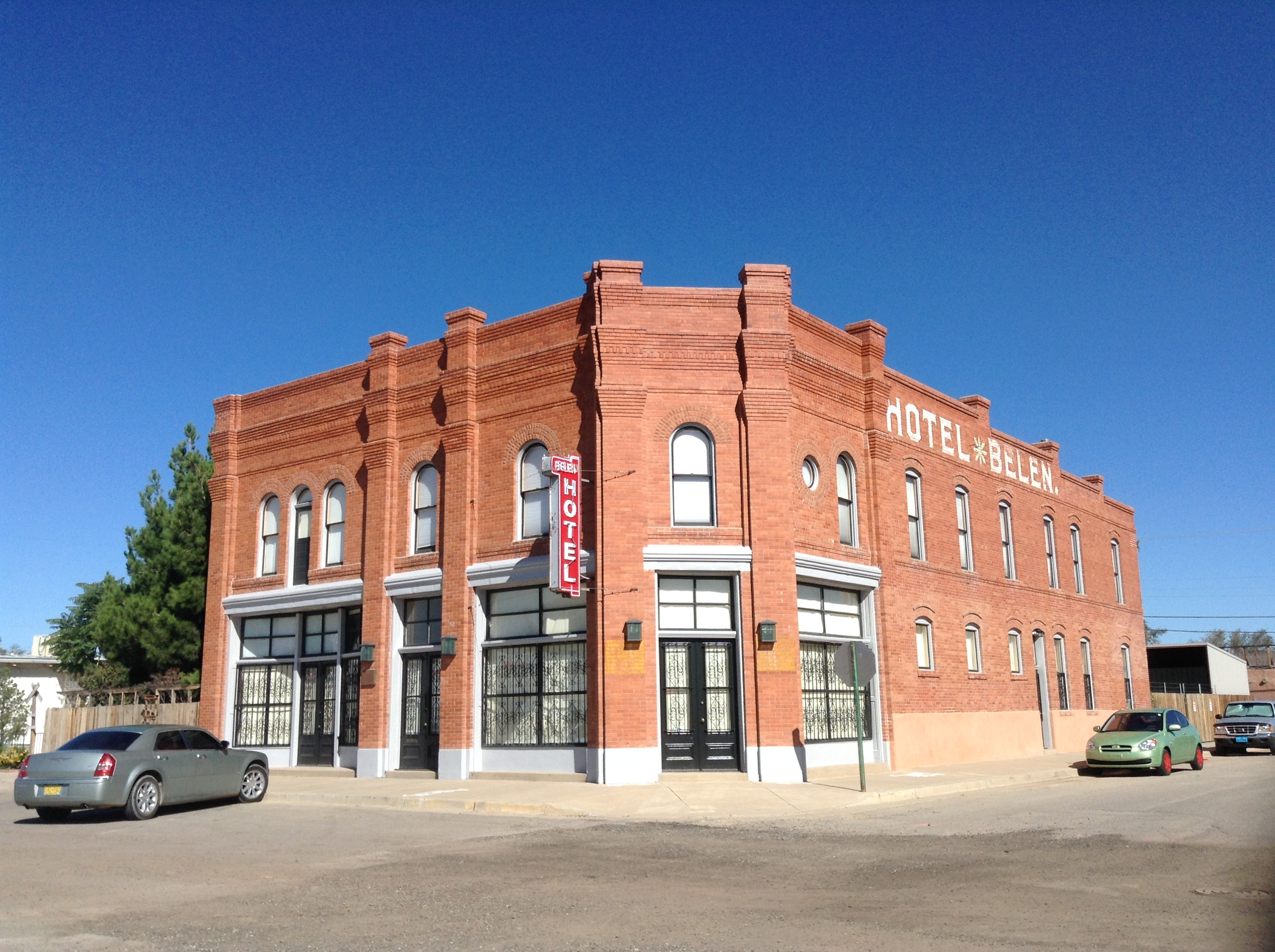
The Belen Hotel is listed on the National Register of Historic Places

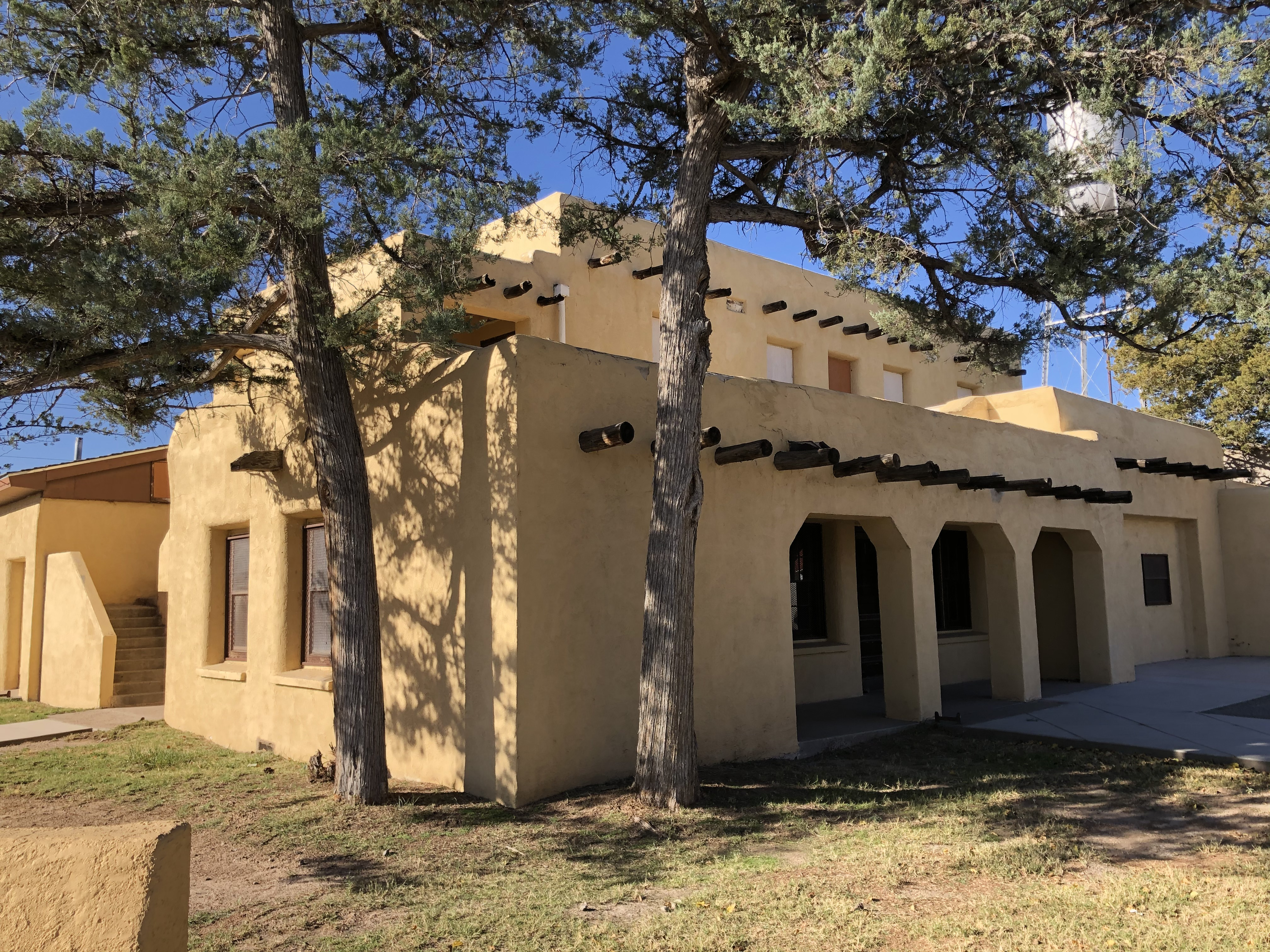
Old City Hall

Belén's central business district and downtown is located along Becker and Dalies avenues, stretching from the BNSF rail yard to Main Street. Downtown Belen features structures dating back to the early 20th century when the railroad came to town.

The Belen Hotel and Central Hotel, both located on Becker Avenue, are two-story structures built to accommodate railroaders and other rail guests in the early 1900s. Both were constructed of bricks made from the former Belén brickyard. Today, the Belen Hotel has been converted into a private residence and private art gallery, while the Central Hotel has been renovated to include a private residence upstairs with a wine-tasting room, and an event space and ballroom downstairs.

Old City Hall, also located on Becker Avenue, is a 1938 Works Progress Administration project, which housed the former Belén City Hall and fire department. The two-story building was constructed of terron, a material similar to adobe.

The Belén Harvey House is located within feet of the BNSF rail yard. It is a two-story building that opened in 1907, one year before the completion of the Belén Cutoff, to provide room and board to railroaders and others passing through. The original Belén rail depot is adjacent to the Harvey House grounds, owned by BNSF and used as office space for the railroad.

The Scholle building, located at the intersection of Main Street and Becker Avenue, is one of the more architecturally significant buildings in Belén, due to the engineering behind the architecture. Originally designed as a Swiss chalet, the Scholle building has more than eight miles of rail built into its walls.

The Oñate Theater, located on Dalies Avenue, was built in the early 20th century, showing many major marquee films. The theater is situated on the same block as three other historic buildings.

== Demographics ==
Historical population
Census	Pop.	Note	%±
1920	1,306		—
1930	2,116		62.0%
1940	3,038		43.6%
1950	4,495		48.0%
1960	5,031		11.9%
1970	4,823		−4.1%
1980	5,617		16.5%
1990	6,547		16.6%
2000	6,901		5.4%
2010	7,269		5.3%
2020	7,360		1.3%
U.S. Decennial Census

=== 2020 census ===
As of the 2020 census, Belen had a population of 7,360. The median age was 40.8 years. 23.7% of residents were under the age of 18 and 21.0% of residents were 65 years of age or older. For every 100 females there were 95.4 males, and for every 100 females age 18 and over there were 92.5 males age 18 and over.

93.3% of residents lived in urban areas, while 6.7% lived in rural areas.

There were 2,961 households in Belen, of which 30.4% had children under the age of 18 living in them. Of all households, 35.3% were married-couple households, 23.4% were households with a male householder and no spouse or partner present, and 33.6% were households with a female householder and no spouse or partner present. About 31.4% of all households were made up of individuals and 14.1% had someone living alone who was 65 years of age or older.

There were 3,350 housing units, of which 11.6% were vacant. The homeowner vacancy rate was 1.2% and the rental vacancy rate was 11.1%.

Racial composition as of the 2020 census
Race	Number	Percent
White	3,874	52.6%
Black or African American	104	1.4%
American Indian and Alaska Native	167	2.3%
Asian	45	0.6%
Native Hawaiian and Other Pacific Islander	9	0.1%
Some other race	1,400	19.0%
Two or more races	1,761	23.9%
Hispanic or Latino (of any race)	4,884	66.4%

=== 2000 census ===
As of the 2000 United States census, there were 6,901 people, 2,596 households, and 1,778 families residing in the city. The population density was 1,463.1 inhabitants per square mile (564.9/km^{2}). There were 2,952 housing units at an average density of 625.9 per square mile (241.7/km^{2}). The racial makeup of the city was 67.50% White, 1.07% African American, 1.65% Native American, 0.17% Asian, 0.16% Pacific Islander, 25.39% from other races, and 4.06% from two or more races. Hispanic or Latino of any race were 68.61% of the population.

There were 2,596 households, out of which 34.8% had children under the age of 18 living with them, 44.3% were married couples living together, 17.8% had a female householder with no husband present, and 31.5% were non-families. 26.2% of all households were made up of individuals, and 10.6% had someone living alone who was 65 years of age or older. The average household size was 2.61 and the average family size was 3.14.

In the city, the population was spread out, with 28.8% under the age of 18, 9.6% from 18 to 24, 25.5% from 25 to 44, 21.0% from 45 to 64, and 15.1% who were 65 years of age or older. The median age was 35 years. For every 100 females, there were 91.5 males. For every 100 females age 18 and over, there were 90.4 males.

The median income for a household in the city was $26,754, and the median income for a family was $30,765. Males had a median income of $26,551 versus $21,300 for females. The per capita income for the city was $12,999. About 23.2% of families and 24.8% of the population were below the poverty line, including 33.9% of those under age 18 and 18.2% of those age 65 or over.

== Government ==
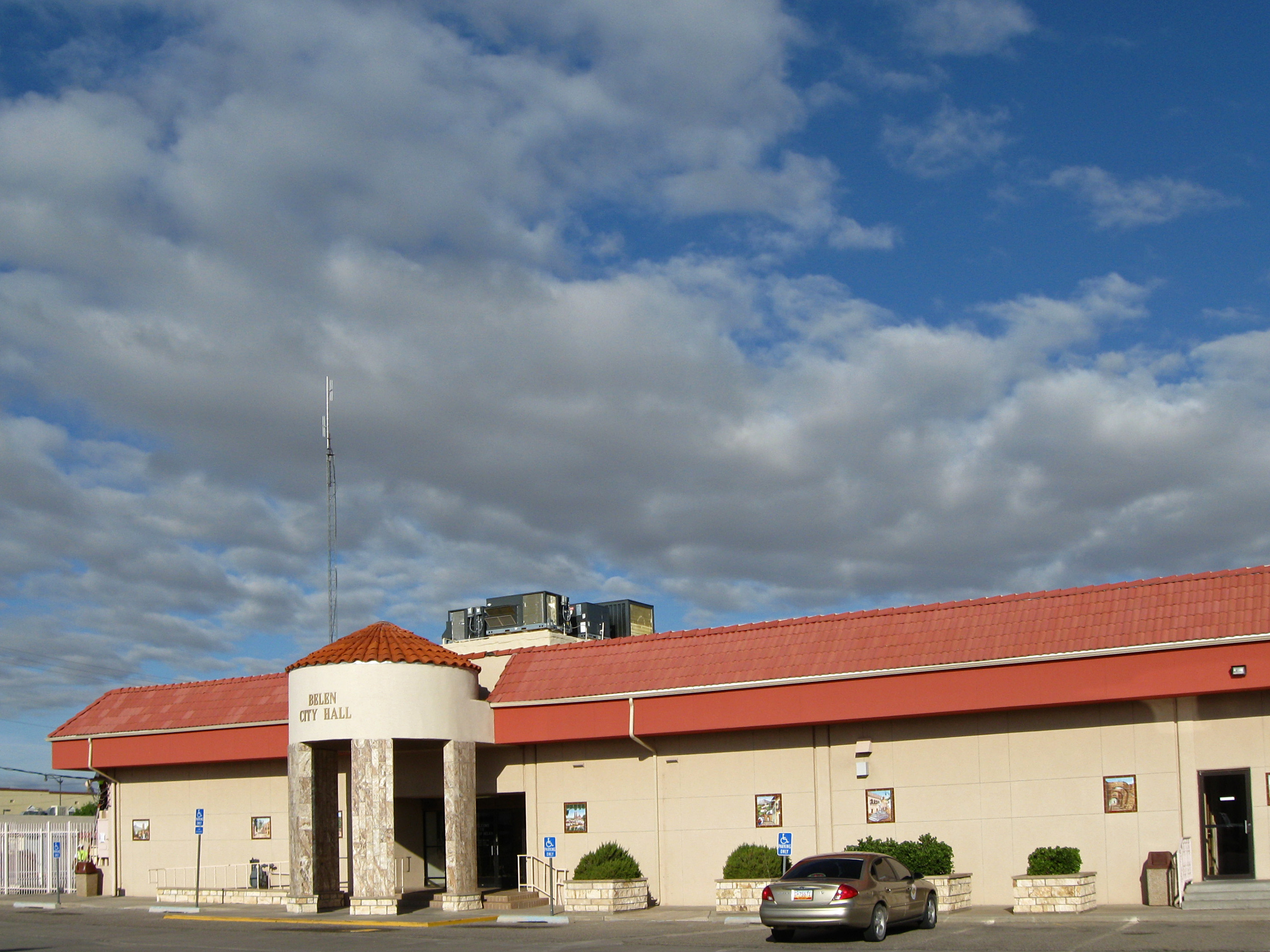
Belen City Hall

Belen is governed by a mayor-council form of government, with a city manager. The governing body consists of an elected mayor and four elected councilors. The city also has an elected municipal judge. Belen has five appointed positions: city manager, police chief, fire chief, treasurer and clerk.

== Culture ==
=== Annual festivals and other events ===
Belen is home to a number of annual cultural events, including the St. Patrick's Day Balloon Rallye on the Saturday before St. Patrick's Day, the All-American Fourth of July around July 4, Rio Abajo Days on the last Saturday in September, and the Miracle on Main Street Festival and Electric Light Parade on the Saturday after Thanksgiving.

The Hispano Matanza, held annually in Belen on the last Saturday in January, is considered the world's largest matanza, a Spanish-style barbecue that can trace its origin back to the conquistadors. This New Mexico matanza tradition, hosted by the Hispano Chamber of Valencia County, involves slaughtering and cooking 45 pigs, then serving the free food, such as chicharrones, to more than 10,000 patrons. All of the proceeds are given as scholarships to local college students.

The Our Lady of Belen Fiestas, held annually in Belen during one weekend in mid-August, is an event that has been around for more than 230 years. The fiestas, or parties, draw thousands of people from across the state and country to Belen for religious observance, and to celebrate with a carnival. The fiestas is held around the time Valencia County's green chile is ready for harvest, making its way as garnishing the "Fiesta Burger."

Follow the Star is an annual celebration of the birth of Jesus Christ and pays homage to the Christian heritage of Belen (Spanish for Bethlehem), held each December. The journey begins at Second St. and Becker Ave. in Belen's historic downtown and proceeds to Sixth St. and Becker Ave., culminating in the lighting of the Star of Bethlehem on Belen's water tower. Along the path the Christmas story is told with live characters and music by sponsoring churches.

=== Museums ===
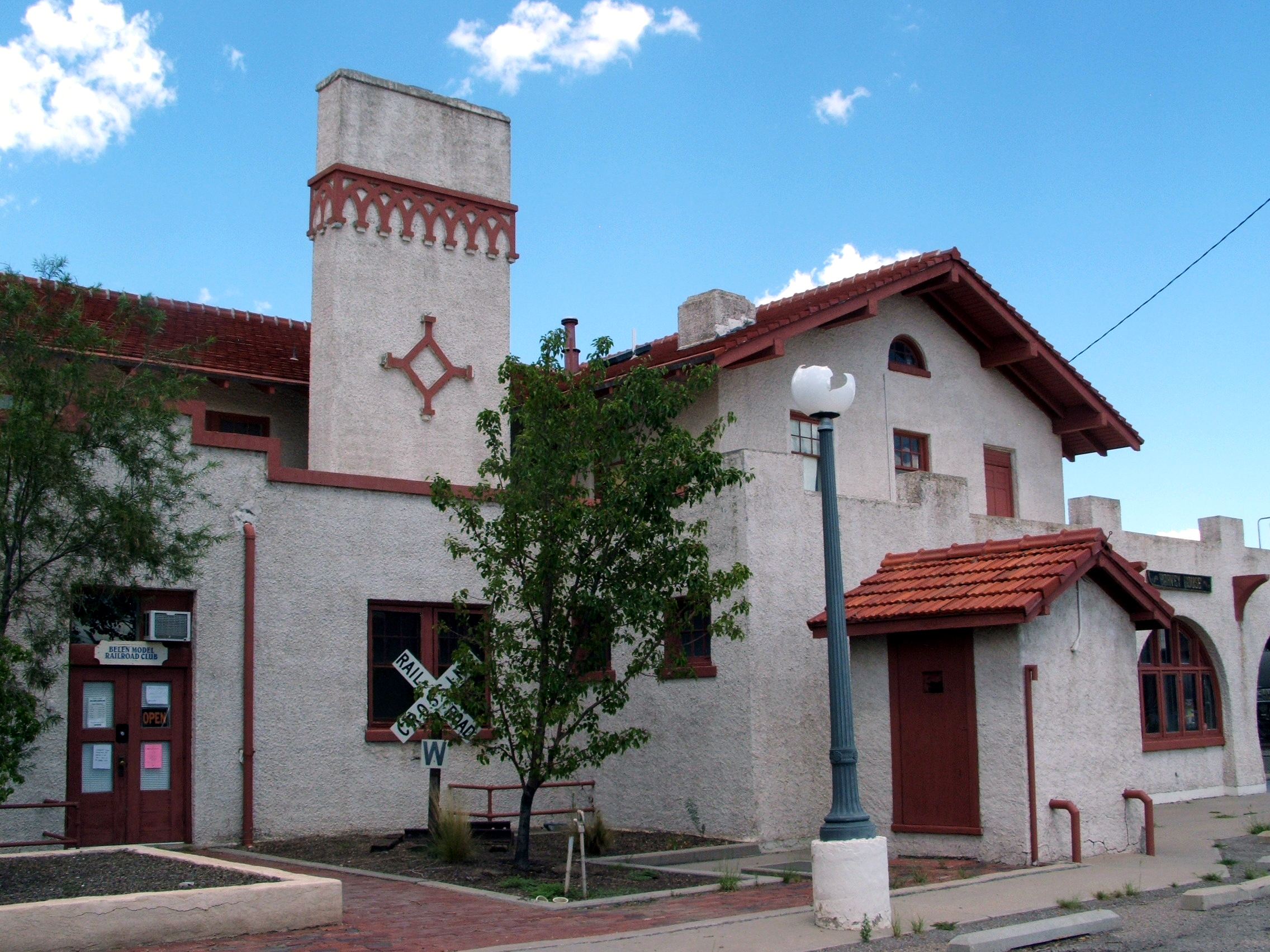
Harvey House Museum

Belen has the only Harvey House Museum in New Mexico. The Santa Fe railroad arrived in Belen in 1880, when Belen was a small farming community. For the next 25 years, there was little train traffic through Belen, because the main rail line went west from Albuquerque. In 1908, the railroad opened a new line that avoided the steep grades over Raton Pass. This new line was the Belen cut-off, and it routed many more trains through Belen. Shortly after the new development, Belen began to bustle.

Rail passengers who stopped in Belen needed a place to dine, so in 1910 the railroad built a Harvey House restaurant adjacent to the railroad tracks. It was the 86th restaurant in the chain operated by Fred Harvey. It contained a large lunchroom, a more formal dining room, a newsstand, kitchen facilities, a bakery, and sleeping rooms upstairs for the Harvey Girls who served the meals.

That Harvey House is extant today. It houses memorabilia pertaining to the Harvey House and the Santa Fe Railway, as well as exhibits on early local businesses and residents in Belen.

The Belen Harvey House is the official railroad museum of the State of New Mexico and is a branch of the Belen Public Library.

=== Parks and outdoor attractions ===
Belen has nine parks and is home to the Valencia County Fairgrounds.

The Valencia County Fairgrounds is situated along the I-25 Bypass on the north side of Belen. The fairgrounds include two rodeo areas and the Sheriff's Posse, a restaurant and a dance hall. Every August, the fairgrounds host the Valencia County Fair, coupled with the fair parade down Main Street.

Eagle Park is located near I-25 and Belen High School. It is Belen's multipurpose park, including several soccer fields, baseball fields, tennis courts, and an outdoor basketball court. Eagle Park also has a community center with a weight room, indoor basketball court and several meeting rooms.

Historic Anna Becker Park, located in downtown Belen was named after the wife of Belen's most influential businessman, John Becker. It was once a pond where residents ice skated in the winter. The park includes a sand volleyball pit, basketball court, and historic gazebo.

Doodlebug Park features a restored Doodlebug rail car. The Doodlebug is known in Belen for shuttling Belen residents to Albuquerque in the early 20th century. The Doodlebug at Doodlebug Park was restored by the production crew from the movie The Last Stand, which was filmed near the park, at the request of Lions Gate and Arnold Schwarzenegger, who starred in the film.

Belen also has Sen. Willie M. Chavez State Park, next to the Rio Grande along Highway 309. The park has walking trails and picnic grounds. During special events it is open for camping. It is the site of Belen's annual ham radio operator event, as well as a fishing derby that takes place at the acequia, or irrigation canal, that runs through the park.

Other parks include El Corazon de Belen Garden Park, Jose Gallegos Park, Rosedale Park, Ross Park, and Welcome Park.

=== Media ===
The Valencia County News-Bulletin is a weekly news publication covering all of Valencia County.

KBNM-LP is a radio station in Belen, playing oldies and other music throughout Valencia County.

== Education ==
The vast majority of Belen is within the Belen Consolidated Schools district, which includes two high schools: Belén High School and Infinity High School, one middle school and seven elementary schools. Belen Consolidated Schools also has an alternative high school and a family school for home schooled students.

Small portions of Belen are in Los Lunas Public Schools.

Our Lady of Belen Catholic Church runs the private St. Mary's Catholic School (affiliated with the Roman Catholic Archdiocese of Santa Fe), and Calvary Chapel Rio Grande Valley runs the private Canon Christian Academy.

Belen residents are served by the University of New Mexico Valencia Campus in Tome and the University of New Mexico's main campus in Albuquerque.

== Transportation ==
=== Roads ===
Belen's western boundary is Interstate 25. Belen is intersected by New Mexico Highway 314 and Highway 309.

=== Airport ===
Belen Regional Airport, Valencia County's only public airport, is a regional general aviation airport. It primarily serves general aviation, including business activity from jet and multi-engine aircraft. The airport is used by flight instructors, skydivers, crop dusters and recreational pilots, among others. Several aviation-related businesses are located at the airport.

=== Rail ===
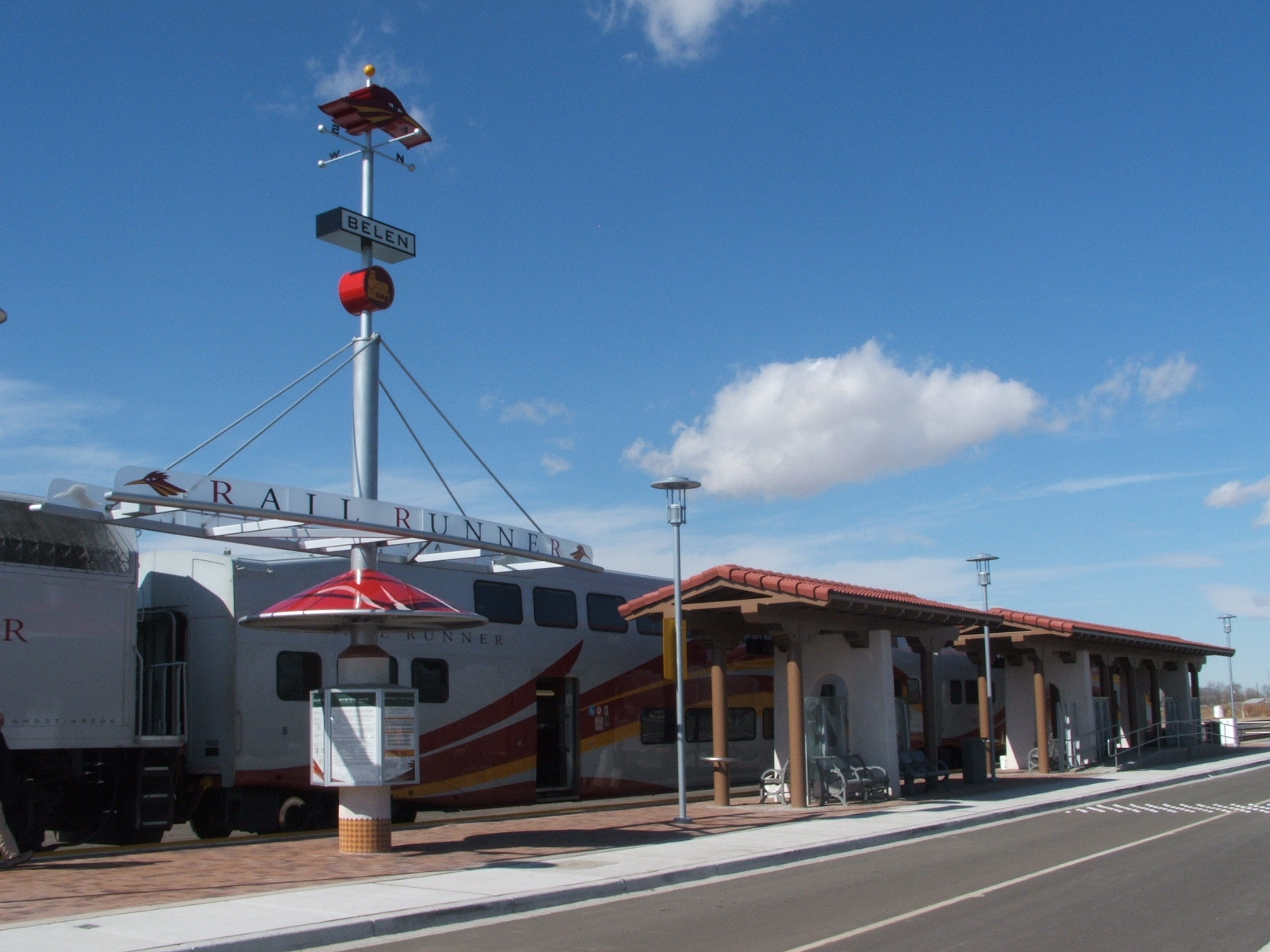
Belen train station

Belen is intersected by the rails of the BNSF Railway, which has both east-west and north-south routes through the city. The New Mexico Rail Runner Express also has a commuter rail station at the north end of the BNSF rail yard, shuttling passengers to and from Belen on a daily basis and connecting with Albuquerque and Santa Fe.

The BNSF Rail Yard in Belen serves as a major division point for the Southern Transcon.

=== Bicycle routes ===
New Mexico Bike Route 1 follows Reinken Avenue through Belen. The route connects Belén with Bernardo, which is south of Belén at a distance of 17½ miles.

== Notable people ==
- Art Aragon (1927–2008), boxer
- Bartolomé Baca (1767–1834), Mexican governor of New Mexico
- Gregory A. Baca (born 1971), New Mexico state senator
- Joe Baca (born 1947), U.S. Representative from California
- Tara Calico (born 1969; status unknown), missing person
- Gloria Castillo (1933–1978), actress
- Richard Carrillo (born 1967), Nevada state assembly member
- Judy Chicago (born 1939), artist
- Tony Gabaldon (1930–1998), Arizona state senator
- Damon Gray, singer
- Clinton Harden (1947–2025), New Mexico state senator
- Mike Nesbitt, football coach
- David Parker Ray (1939–2002), abductor and possible serial killer
- Joshua A. Sanchez (born 1981), New Mexico state senator
- Michael S. Sanchez (born 1950), New Mexico state senator
