= 104.7 FM =

FM radio frequency

The following radio stations broadcast on FM frequency 104.7 MHz:

== Argentina ==
- Activa in Caleta Olivia, Santa Cruz
- Cadena Alcazar in Oberá, Misiones
- Dakota in Federal, Entre Ríos
- Dale in Tafí Viejo, Tucumán
- La Radio in Concepcion del Bermejo, Chaco
- La Tropi in Comodoro Rivadavia, Chubut
- Líder in Trenque Lauquen, Buenos Aires
- LRN 373 Premium in Santa Rosa Del Conlara, San Luis
- Radio María in Rio Tercero, Córdoba
- Radio Propia in General Pico, La Pampa
- Secla in Avellaneda, Buenos Aires
- Sucesos in Córdoba

== Australia ==
- 2ROC in Canberra, Australian Capital Territory
- 2BOB in Taree, New South Wales
- 2CLR in Grafton, New South Wales
- 3GCR in Latrobe Valley, Victoria
- 5MMM in Adelaide, South Australia
- 3GRR in Echuca, Victoria
- Radio National in Townsville, Queensland
- Triple J in Rockhampton, Queensland

== Canada (Channel 284) ==
- CBAF-FM-7 in Digby, Nova Scotia
- CBCH-FM in Charlottetown, Prince Edward Island
- CBME-FM-1 in Montreal, Quebec
- CBVE-FM in Quebec City, Quebec
- CFDY-FM in Cochrane, Ontario
- CFLO-FM in Mont-Laurier, Quebec
- CFRI-FM in Grande Prairie, Alberta
- CHBZ-FM in Cranbrook, British Columbia
- CIHR-FM in Woodstock, Ontario
- CIPN-FM in Pender Harbour, British Columbia
- CIUR-FM in Winnipeg, Manitoba
- CJFL-FM in Iroquois Falls, Ontario
- CJRG-FM-1 in Murdochville, Quebec
- CKEH-FM in Houston, British Columbia
- CKKS-FM in Sechelt, British Columbia
- CKLZ-FM in Kelowna, British Columbia
- CKOF-FM in Gatineau, Quebec
- VF2013 in Havre-St-Pierre, Quebec
- VF2471 in Canyon Creek, British Columbia
- VF2489 in Campement Eastmain, Quebec
- VF8017 in L'Assomption, Quebec

== China ==
- CNR Business Radio in Changchun and Hefei
- CNR China Traffic Radio in Zhengzhou
- CNR The Voice of China in Liuzhou
- HSBTV Radio Heshan in Jiangmen

== Indonesia ==
- MNC Trijaya FM in Surabaya
- RadioQu Batam in Batam

== Israel ==
- Kan Tarbut in Beersheba, Eilat and Haifa

== Italy ==
- Radio Studio 5 in Sciacca, Sicilia

== Jamaica ==
- BBC World Service

== Malaysia ==
- TraXX FM in Kota Bharu, Kelantan
- Lite in Kuantan, Pahang

== Mexico ==
- XHCI-FM in Acapulco, Guerrero
- XHCNE-FM in Cananea, Sonora
- XHEHB-FM in San Francisco del Oro, Chihuahua
- XHERP-FM in Tampico, Tamaulipas
- XHGS-FM in Guasave, Sinaloa
- XHICT-FM in Tulum, Quintana Roo
- XHLB-FM in Jamay, Jalisco
- XHLOVE-FM in Ciudad Juarez, Chihuahua
- XHPTLA-FM in San Andrés Tuxtla, Veracruz
- XHRGO-FM in Tala, Jalisco
- XHRLK-FM in Atlacomulco, Estado de México
- XHSIBZ-FM in Jaltocán, Hidalgo
- XHUGC-FM in Colotlán, Jalisco
- XHUGL-FM in Lagos de Moreno, Jalisco

== North Macedonia ==
- Radio KISS in Tetovo, North Macedonia

== Philippines ==
- DWEY in Batangas
- DWON in Dagupan
- DWSS-FM in Naga City
- DYAG-FM in Bacolod City
- DYAB-FM in Tacloban City
- DYDC-FM in Baybay City
- DYSL-FM in Sogod, Southern Leyte
- DYEL-FM in Bais City
- DXYR in Cagayan De Oro City
- DXMB-FM in Pagadian City
- DXEI in Kidapawan City
- DXRZ in Surigao City
- DXMF in Maramag, Bukidnon
- DXAS in Bongao, Tawi-Tawi

== United Kingdom ==
- Abbey104, Sherborne
- Greatest Hits Radio York and North Yorkshire, York
- BBC Radio Lincolnshire (Grantham frequency)

== United States (Channel 284) ==
- KAPU-LP in Watsonville, California
- KBZM in Big Sky, Montana
- KOCP in Oxnard, California
- KCAW in Sitka, Alaska
- KCLD in Saint Cloud, Minnesota
- KCMB in Baker, Oregon
- KCYC-LP in Yuba City, California
- KDES in Palm Springs, California
- KDUK in Florence, Oregon
- KDUX-FM in Hoquiam, Washington
- KEAU in Elko, Nevada
- KELR-LP in Stockton, California
- KELS-LP in Greeley, Colorado
- KERG in Escobares, Texas
- KFEG in Klamath Falls, Oregon
- KFGO-FM in Hope, North Dakota
- KFLI in Des Arc, Arkansas
- KHMD in Mansfield, Louisiana
- KHSB-FM in Kingsland, Texas
- KHTN in Planada, California
- KHUM in Cutten, California
- KIHT in Amboy, California
- KIKX in Ketchum, Idaho
- KJUL in Moapa Valley, Nevada
- KKBT in Leone, American Samoa
- KKED in Fairbanks, Alaska
- KKLH in Marshfield, Missouri
- KKLS in Sioux Falls, South Dakota
- KKRV in Wenatchee, Washington
- KKVM in Vail, Colorado
- KKYS in Bryan, Texas
- KMKZ-LP in Loveland, Colorado
- KMOU in Roswell, New Mexico
- KNDR in Mandan, North Dakota
- KNEK in Washington, Louisiana
- KNFZ in Bosque Farms, New Mexico
- KNIV in Lyman, Wyoming
- KNNG in Sterling, Colorado
- KOJH-LP in Kansas City, Missouri
- KOMF-LP in Denver, Colorado
- KONI in Lanai City, Hawaii
- KOOU in Hardy, Arkansas
- KQBK in Waldron, Arkansas
- KQEV-LP in Walnut, California
- KQMJ in Blanket, Texas
- KQSN in Ponca City, Oklahoma
- KRES in Moberly, Missouri
- KREV-LP in Estes Park, Colorado
- KREZ (FM) in Chaffee, Missouri
- KRQL-LP in Santa Ana, California
- KRYH-LP in Temple, Texas
- KSGG in Soledad, California
- KSLE in Wewoka, Oklahoma
- KSXA-LP in Santa Ana, California
- KTFJ-LP in Burlington, Washington
- KTOY in Texarkana, Arkansas
- KTRS in Casper, Wyoming
- KVBM-LP in Killeen, Texas
- KVCY in Fort Scott, Kansas
- KVIC in Victoria, Texas
- KVIK in Decorah, Iowa
- KVLM in Tarzan, Texas
- KWNS in Winnsboro, Texas
- KWTG in Vidalia, Louisiana
- KXBZ in Manhattan, Kansas
- KXRN-LP in Laguna Beach, California
- KYYI in Burkburnett, Texas
- KZQB-LP in Brownsville, Texas
- KZZP in Mesa, Arizona
- WAAZ in Crestview, Florida
- WAIA in Athens, Georgia
- WAYG-LP in Miami, Florida
- WBAK in Belfast, Maine
- WBBS in Fulton, New York
- WCFL in Morris, Illinois
- WDDW in Sturtevant, Wisconsin
- WEJO-LP in State College, Pennsylvania
- WELJ in Montauk, New York
- WEQY-LP in Saint Paul, Minnesota
- WFRN in Elkhart, Indiana
- WGSM-LP in Madisonville, Tennessee
- WGTL in La Grange, North Carolina
- WHNY-FM in Henry, Tennessee
- WHTP-FM in Kennebunkport, Maine
- WHUP-LP in Hillsborough, North Carolina
- WHWA in Washburn, Wisconsin
- WIOT in Toledo, Ohio
- WIRQ in Rochester, New York
- WITG-LP in Ocala, Florida
- WITZ-FM in Jasper, Indiana
- WJMD in Hazard, Kentucky
- WJSH in Folsom, Louisiana
- WJUI-LP in Ramtown, New Jersey
- WKAQ in San Juan, Puerto Rico
- WKGT-LP in North Adams, Massachusetts
- WKJC in Tawas City, Michigan
- WKKY in Geneva, Ohio
- WKQC in Charlotte, North Carolina
- WLMD (FM) in Bushnell, Illinois
- WLNQ in White Pine, Tennessee
- WLRJ in Greenville, Mississippi
- WMRP-LP in Mundy Township, Michigan
- WNCS in Montpelier, Vermont
- WNOK in Columbia, South Carolina
- WNSV in Nashville, Illinois
- WOCN in Orleans, Massachusetts
- WOGM-LP in Jamestown, New York
- WPBB in Palm Beach Shores, Florida
- WPGB in Pittsburgh, Pennsylvania
- WPZZ in Crewe, Virginia
- WQHQ in Ocean City-Salisbury, Maryland
- WRBQ in Tampa, Florida
- WRYS in Hagerstown, Maryland
- WSGL in Naples, Florida
- WSGM in Coalmont, Tennessee
- WSPK in Poughkeepsie, New York
- WSWJ-LP in Hager City, Wisconsin
- WSWL-LP in Valdosta, Georgia
- WTHG in Hinesville, Georgia
- WTUE in Dayton, Ohio
- WVRC in Spencer, West Virginia
- WYKX in Escanaba, Michigan
- WYUN-LP in Coconut Creek, Florida
- WYZT-LP in Annapolis, Maryland
- WZOS in Berlin, Wisconsin
- WZZK in Birmingham, Alabama
