= DXAS =

DXAS may refer to:

- DXAS-AM, an AM radio station broadcasting in Zamboanga City
- DXAS-FM, an FM radio station broadcasting in Bongao, branded as Radyo Pilipinas
- DXAS-TV, a defunct television station in Davao City, branded as ABS-CBN Davao
