= JFL =

JFL may refer to:

- CJFL-FM, a defunct radio station licensed to Iroquois Falls, Ontario, Canada
- Jasaji Fighting League, a Mexican mixed martial arts promotion
- Japan Football League (1992–1998), the former second division of football (soccer) in Japan
- Japan Football League, the current fourth division of football in Japan
- Japan FM League. a commercial radio network
- Japanese as a foreign language
- John Francis Leader, Irish psychologist and cognitive scientist
- Just Follow Law, a Singaporean film
- Just for Laughs, a comedy festival in Montreal, Quebec, Canada
- Just for Laughs (British TV series)
- WJFL, a radio station licensed to Tennille, Georgia, United States
