= John C. Broger =

John C. Broger (October 30, 1913 - February 19, 2006) was an American Christian missionary, author, radio producer, and public servant.

== Biography ==
John Christian Broger was born in Tennessee 1913. In his young life Broger, a graduate from Southern California Bible College, became a missionary practicing his faith in Southeast Asia after serving as a Naval Reservist and Warrant Officer in the Intelligence and Electronics Branch on the aircraft carrier Bon Homme Richard. After his demobilization Broger returned to the States to apply his theological passions and incorporated the Far East Broadcasting Company (FEBC) - a Christian radio ministry broadcasting Christian programs into Asia in Los Angeles, California with Robert H. Bowman and Pastor William J Roberts on December 20, 1945. Permission by the Philippine government insisted that FEBC begin broadcasting by June 4, 1948 and despite funding issues the station went on the air with the radio staff singing the song "All Hail the Power of Jesus' Name". Manila. Today FEBC remains on the air serving every country in Asia in more than 150 languages.

Broger stepped down from his position at the FEBC to run the U.S. Military's indoctrination program. In 1954 Broger was recruited by Admiral Arthur W. Radford to develop an ideological framework for the U.S. Military. Militant Liberty: A Program of Evaluation and Assessment of Freedom was designed to provide a Free World ideological framework to combat Communism. In 1956 Broger became Deputy Director of the Directorate for Armed Forces Information and Education (Armed Forces Information Service), Office of the Assistant Secretary of Defense (Manpower) - and later Director of that office which he held until 1984. During his tenure Broger conducted many other psychological operations aimed at countering the effects of communist ideology.

== Bibliography ==
- Self-Confrontation: A Manual for In-Depth Biblical Discipleship - Syllabus for Course One 1 - Biblical Counseling Training Program (2004)
- Competent to Counsel: Study guide for Christian counseling training course (2001)
- Self-Confrontation: A Manual for In'Depth Discipleship (1994)
- Instructor's Guide for the 24 Week Self-Confrontation, Course 1: Based on the Old and New Testaments as the Only Authoritative Rule of Faith and Conduct (1992)
- Self-Confrontation: Based on the Old and New Testaments as the only Authoritative Rule of Faith and Conduct (1980)
