= DXKI =

DXKI may refer to:

- DXKI-AM, an AM radio station broadcasting in Koronadal
- DXKI-FM, an FM radio station broadcasting in Cagayan De Oro, branded as Strong Radio
