= KREV =

KREV may refer to:

- KonungaRikena Elgaland-Vargaland, a Swedish art project
- KREV-LP, a radio station (104.7 FM) licensed to Estes Park, Colorado, United States
- KEXC (FM), a radio station (92.7 FM) licensed to Alameda, California, United States that held the KREV callsign from 2009 until 2024
- WGVX, a radio station (105.1 FM) licensed to Lakeville, Minnesota, United States, which held the call sign KREV from April 1994 to May 1997
