= KSAI =

KSAI may refer to:

- KSAI (AM), a defunct radio station (936 AM) formerly licensed to serve Susupe, Saipan, Northern Mariana Islands
- KSAI (FM), a radio station (99.5 FM) licensed to Citrus Heights, California, United States
- KAIS (FM), a radio station (90.3 FM) licensed to serve Salem, Oregon, United States, which held the call sign KSAI from 2022 to 2025
