= Luis Gatmaitan =

Luis P. Gatmaitán, M.D., is a Filipino medical doctor and children's author. He appears on a radio program, Doctors On Line, on Monday mornings at DZAS as a medical consultant.

Gatmaitán was inducted into the Palanca Hall of Fame in 2005 for his writing. Most of his work is in the genre of children's literature, for which he has garnered many awards, including the Catholic Mass Media Awards. His books include Mga Kwento ni Tito Dok and Sandosenang Sapatos. His medical career has been cited as one of HealthToday Philippines Magazine 's Ten Pillars of the Philippine Health Care Industry.

Gatmaitán has authored and published more than 30 storybooks for children tackling issues such as disability, senility, coping with death, coping with cancer, childhood diseases, and children's rights in his stories. His children's book series Mga Kuwento ni Tito Dok was cited by the Manila Critics Circle "for its popularization of the science of medicine in language and illustrations that young children can understand, for its indigenizing of universal scientific principles, and for its imaginative reconstruction of what happens in the human body."

Inducted into the Palanca Hall of Fame in 2005, he has also been a recipient of the Catholic Mass Media Awards and the PBBY-Salanga Writers Prize. His children's book Sandosenang Sapatos, now listed in the International Board on Books for Young People (IBBY) catalogue for the Bologna International Children's Book Fair 2005, was named the 2005 Outstanding Book for Young People with Disabilities by the IBBY. He has also been cited as one of HealthToday Philippines Magazine's Ten Pillars of the Philippine Health Care Industry, 2003 Ten Outstanding Young Men (TOYM) of the Philippines for his contribution in the field of Literature, and as finalist in the 2004 Ten Outstanding Young Persons of the World (TOYP) search. Published by several local publishing houses and international agencies like the UNICEF and WORLD VISION INTERNATIONAL, Gatmaitan has also chaired the PBBY and Kuwentista ng mga Tsikiting (KUTING).

He hosts a children's storytelling program for radio every Saturday morning over DZAS, entitled Wan Dey Isang Araw.
