= DWSS (disambiguation) =

DWSS stands for Defense Weather Satellite System. It may also refer to the two Philippine radio stations:

- DWSS-AM, an AM radio station broadcasting in Metro Manila, Philippines
- DWSS-FM, an FM radio station broadcasting in Naga, Camarines Sur, Philippines
