= Militant Liberty: A Program of Evaluation and Assessment of Freedom =

Militant Liberty; A Program of Evaluation and Assessment of Freedom
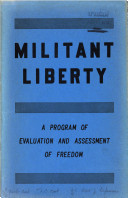
- Author: U.S. Department of Defense
- Language: English
- Publisher: U.S. Govt. Print. Off., 1955
- Publication date: November 2, 1955
- Publication place: United States
- Media type: Print (paperback)
- Pages: 18

Militant Liberty: A Program of Evaluation and Assessment of Freedom was a top secret United States Department of Defense project that aimed to utilize information operations and resources at the Pentagon's disposal to counteract the ideological threat of Communism during the Cold War.

Militant Liberty was meant to serve as a guiding document for the United States Armed Forces as a means to educate foreign and domestic audiences about the merits of democracy and the ideals of liberty and freedom according to the principles of the American way of life. Published on November 2, 1955, it was the result of a thesis, 'Militant Liberty', presented to Charles Erwin Wilson, United States Secretary of Defense by John C. Broger. Broger was President of the Far East Broadcasting Company and a hired consultant in the Joint Subsidiary Activities Division in the Office of the Joint Chiefs of Staff during this period.

The purpose of the Militant Liberty pamphlet was to provide a means of evaluation and assessment of liberty or authoritarianism in any given area. It compared and contrasted the ideological differences between those of the Free World and of Communism while establishing principles of individual liberty to which one must strive. This program was one of the many attempts the Department of Defense made to establish an ideological doctrine for the United States.

== Origin ==
John C. Broger developed the Militant Liberty concept in the early 1950s and presented at a University of California conference attended by Brigadier General Millard C. Young at the request of Admiral Arthur W. Radford in 1954. Championed by Admiral Radford, Militant Liberty gained the attention of Defense Secretary Charles E. Wilson who invited Broger and eighteen others to discuss and analyze the concept with him. This conference consisted of members of the military, as well as representatives of the advertising, business and entertainment industries. People such as Kenneth Wells of the Freedoms Foundation were recruited for the Militant Liberty program for the sole purpose of applying marketing strategies and promoting the project it through the federal processes as well as the public relations firm the Jam Handy Agency. With Wilson's endorsement the project was then sent to the Operations Coordinating Board to determine how it was to be utilized in the strategy against Communism.

Although disseminated discreetly among the members of the United States Armed Forces, The Militant Liberty Program remained unclassified and available upon request to the public. A classified version of Militant Liberty called "Project Action" was employed in regions such as Latin America and French Indochina because it was believed that these regions were "particularly receptive to ideological propaganda." The pamphlet was also distributed to other nations in the hopes that they might use Militant Liberty as a Free World guide of their own. The Militant Liberty concept gained further importance when it was exposed that interrogated American POW's in Korea could not describe the intricacies of Communism, nor could counter the ideology with one of their own. The resulting report drafted by the United States Senate Committee on Government Operations recommended an ideological indoctrination program in order to make American soldiers more resilient to communist tactics.

Following the Militant Liberty program, Assistant Defense Secretary Carter Burgess and Assistant Secretary of the Army Hough Milton developed a spin-off program called "Battle for Liberty. " Secretary Wilson had envisioned that Militant Liberty, Battle for Liberty and the Code of Conduct would serve as the guiding documents creating a unified ideological doctrine for the Armed Forces.

== Overview ==
=== The ideological necessity ===
Militant Liberty was designed as a philosophy of liberty of a free society, in terms that are meaningful and can be understood by all peoples. Militant Liberty was a tactic of political and psychological warfare in response to Communist messaging. As Communist propaganda was designed to have a clear, consistent message to its followers, capitalism, liberty, and democracy required a more "dynamic" response.

The premise of militant liberty relies upon the perception that humans around the world have a fundamental understanding of liberty and freedom, and if given the choice will seek to pursue them. Militant Liberty was designed to give people in a free society the knowledge to engage in a discussion of the philosophy of liberty to anyone in the world. Communist gains have been due, in part, to the fact that they understand what and why they believe a certain way and they are able to explain these beliefs to all peoples of the world. Without the knowledge of why they believe it and the ability to explain those beliefs, free people are unable to make the gains that communists have been able to make.

The authors of Militant Liberty recognized that although liberty and freedom are desired by all, these concepts had to be defended and explained in a coherent manner. Whereas communists understood and were well versed in Free World ideologies and could engage in a dialogue as to why theirs was better - individuals in the Free World had greater difficulty.

=== The concept ===
Militant Liberty asserts that freedom and the worth of the individual man are concepts that have been realized in the Western World but have not yet permeated peoples and cultures that reside in the non-Western world. The Communist ideology is more dynamic than that of the West and thus may gain a foothold in regions not yet aware of Free World liberties. The only way to defeat the threat of communism around the world is to combat it with a stronger, more dynamic ideology which "consists of explaining the ideals of liberty in a manner that will motivate peoples everywhere to exercise and collectively demonstrate the practices of a positive philosophy of Freedom."

The Militant Liberty report cites the following three objectives of this concept:

1. Analyze and contrast the basic conflict between Communism and the Free World as it affects the individual
2. Provide a means of measuring the trend toward individual liberty or toward authoritarianism in any nation
3. Set forth the basic principles of liberty and thereby provide goals toward which people should strive if they are to be free.

=== Strengths and weaknesses ===
The strength of the Communist ideology is that it is well-organized and contains the necessary infrastructure dedicated to their stated goals. Within this system, they are able to employ any means of attainment regardless of its effect in the individual. The inherent weakness of this ideology is that their people are not completely indoctrinated, deplore their means of attainment and are thus more inclined to accept the ideology of the Free World.

According to the authors of Militant Liberty, Communists do not believe in the individual self, but rather, in the conscience of an individual being erased. Communists are taught to use any means possible to serve their party's interests, regardless of whether or not they are morally wrong. The communists have every aspect of the environment or conscience eliminated.

=== Strength and weakness of Free World ideology ===
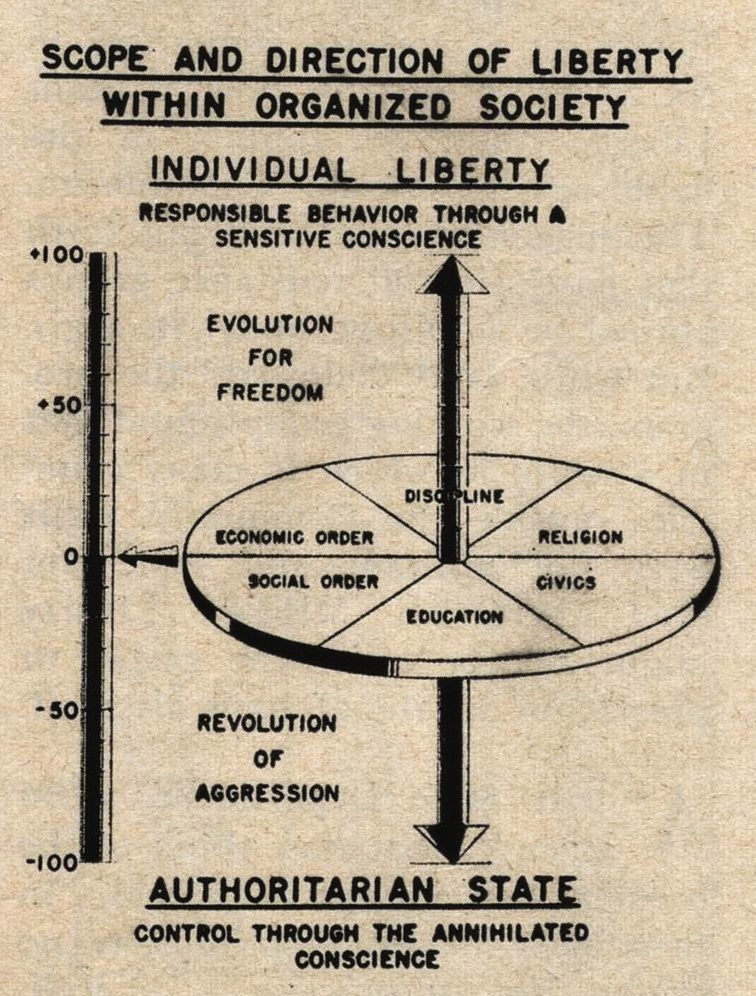
Scope and Direction of Liberty in an Organized Society

The strength of the Free World ideology is that an individual has the right to choose his own prerogatives. This also proves to be the Free World Ideology's weakness as freedom of choice often results in a lack of coordinated direction. According to free people, democracy will not work without the element of the sensitive, conscience of an individual. Without causes with support liberty, such as freedom of speech and freedom of press, free enterprises will not work. Without this individual conscience, power struggles begin among man and it becomes a materialistic competition for survival. "Without the sensitive individual conscience, even the dignity of man is a myth, for without a conscience man is not dignified." The collective will shared by all peoples to remain free is the greatest strength of the free people. However, this common desire lacks coordinated direction and therefore becomes the Free World ideology's greatest weakness.

=== Scope and direction of liberty within organized society ===
Militant Liberty compares and contrasts the ideologies of Communism and the Free World through the scope of individual consciousness, reminiscent of natural law. Where Communism relies on the annihilation of conscience, the Free World relies on the sensitive conscious of the individual. According to the concept of Militant Liberty, a nation is always in a state of change and throughout its course will promote "responsible behavior through a sensitive conscience" (individual liberty) or "control through the annihilated conscience (authoritarian state). The course of a country is measured on the criteria of discipline, religion, civics, education, and social and economic order.

=== Liberty = freedom + responsibility ===
This chapter highlights one of the primary aspects of the Militant Liberty concept: liberty can only be pursued through freedom and responsibility. Freedom offers rights and privileges, but requires the individual to accept the responsibilities that correspond with the freedoms one enjoys. Each individual regardless of geographic location recognizes that they Many of the freedoms illustrated in this chapter have existed in many societies throughout history, and although many freedoms are legislated Militant Liberty goes to demonstrate that responsibility is not as it extends often beyond the individual.

The following chart from Militant Liberty outlines the basic freedoms and the basic responsibilities of this concept:

| THE BASIC FREEDOMS INCLUDE: | THE BASIC RESPONSIBILITIES INCLUDE: |
|---|---|
| 1. Freedom of religion, speech, press and assembly. | 1. Responsibility for tolerance of the beliefs of others. |
| 2. Freedom to choose leaders by personal petition for grievances. | 2. Responsibility to vote conscientiously and to maintain active interest in civil government. |
| 3. Freedom of movement at home & abroad | 3. Responsibility to respect the rights and customs of others |
| 4. Freedom for educational, social, political and economic opportunity with equal protection under the law. | 4. Responsibility to assure equal opportunities and to further individual and national well-being. |
| 5. Freedom to own property and to contract in personal affairs. | 5. Responsibility to employ and conserve resources and to conduct personal affairs for legitimate and productive purposes. |
| 6. Freedom to choose one's own occupation and to bargain with employers and employees. | 6. Responsibility to contribute useful production and to resolve differences on a fair and just basis. |
| 7. Freedom to compete in production and to bargain for goods and services in a free market. | 7. Responsibility for fair and ethical business practices |
| 8. Freedom from arbitrary government and control. | 8. Responsibility to guard against the granting of arbitrary powers to government |
| 9. Freedom from arbitrary search, seizure or detention of person or property and the right to a speedy, public trial by impartial jury. | 9. Responsibility of all citizens to assist, uphold and insure justice, law & order. |
| 10. Freedom from torture, cruel, unusual or degrading punishment or treatment | 10. Responsibility to maintain vigilance against illegal, unfair or injurious practices. |

=== Evaluation and assessment ===
The final segment of Militant Liberty contained four separate charts depicting the differences between The United States and the Soviet Bloc and the difference between the sensitive individual Conscience and the Annihilated Individual Conscience.

The first series of charts labeled A Theoretical Study of International Strength and Weakness analyzed the United States and the Soviet Bloc on six criteria: Discipline, Religion, Civics, Social Order, and Economic Order on a scale of +100 to -100 to with space allowing the reader to assign values and compare the differences between the two.

The second series of charts offers an Evaluation and Development of Objective demonstrating the Free World nation's positions of strength based on Sensitive National Conscience v. the Annihilated National Conscience of the Soviet Bloc. From these demonstrations, the reader was meant to conclude that liberty and freedom would always prevail over Communist ideologies.

In this discussion we have endeavored to do this: to point out basic principals of liberty in which all people can believe; to develop a method by which these principals can be explained versus those of the authoritarian state; to show that the free peoples of the world can create the wave of the future; and to emphasize that victory belongs to those who are militant in their desires and convictions of liberty.

Individuals who believe in liberty should be able to do at least three things in conversation:

a. Understand and explain the common denominator root meaning of Communism and, in contrast, the common denominator root meanings of liberty.

b. Explain liberty in terms of basic problems within economic civil, religious, political, military, social, and education categories.

c. Explain the rights, privileges and responsibilities of liberty and what they mean to the individual and to the nation.

== The end of Militant Liberty ==
There were attempts on multiple fronts to inculcate the Militant Liberty concept, but the idea never gained traction.

This is just another of those front-office boondoggles. The Admiral says we need an ideology, so they hire a guy and appoint a committee that unanimously agrees we're all for clean living and American motherhood and the rest of it. So the fellow writes up a lot of stuff that was said much better in the Boy Scout Handbook, wraps it all up into a capsule, and now they think they've got something like ideological Little Liver Pills. This place isn't what it used to be. It's as if Moral Re-Armament had hit the joint. You'll see.

— Unnamed Colonel attached to the JCS

The militant Liberty Program suffered embarrassment and public criticism just a year after its inception with the publishing of an article titled: "Militant Liberty and the Pentagon" in the February 1956 edition of The Reporter, written by William H. Hale. The article detailed the Militant Liberty program and along with candid interviews with anonymous members within the JCS who were cool to the idea of ideological indoctrination from the Pentagon. State Department, the CIA, and the U.S. Information Agency (USIA), among the different branches of the Armed Services, were all opposed the Militant Liberty concept either on the basis of its "motivational" qualities or "fear-based" approach. There were other accounts by troop-run newspapers that American soldiers overseas were being "brainwashed" by similar programs.

Due to significant opposition the Militant Liberty program was never operationalized and by the 1960s the Militant Liberty Program was reduced to "a short film for new recruits and a wallet-sized card that most services required their personnel to memorize and carry on their person at all times."

== Controversy ==
However short-lived the Militant Liberty Program was, there are critics that say that Militant Liberty and programs like it were an attempt to indoctrinate Evangelical beliefs into American civil society and military doctrine. As the program was implemented by the NSC without the consult of the United States Congress, many critics saw the Militant Liberty program as a breach of the line between the military and civil society.

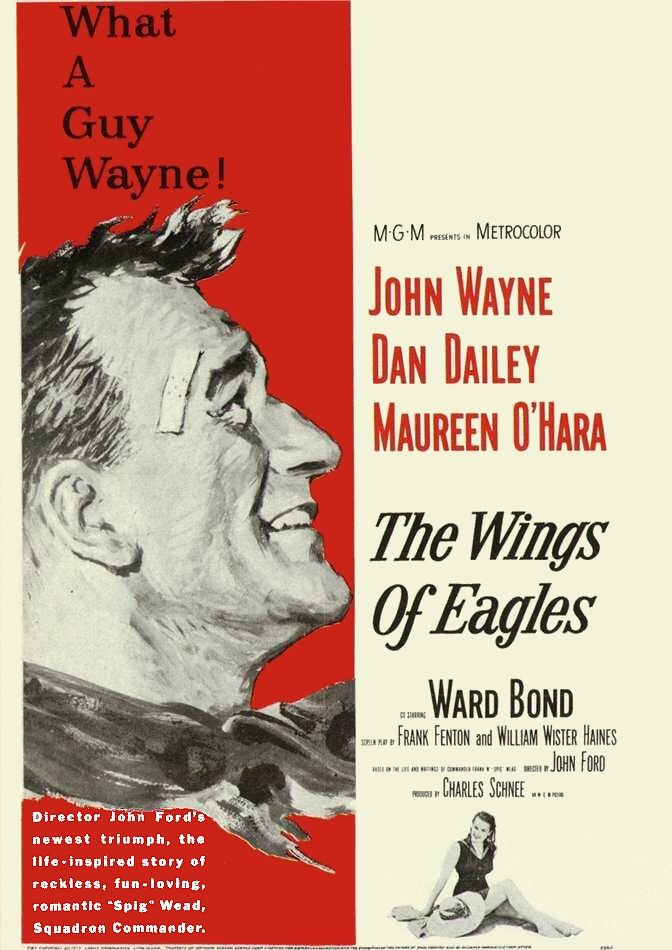
Wings of Eagles 1957

Its chief architect, John C. Broger was founder and President of the Far East Broadcasting Company (a Christian international radio network) and was contracted to develop the Militant Liberty concept by Admiral Arthur Radford, another Christian and fervent anti-communist, who "had become concerned with the need to provide spiritual stiffening to American youth at home as well as to our Allies abroad." With Communism spreading throughout the Asian continent, Mr. Borger and Admiral Radford were well suited to form a partnership that would eventually result in the development and dissemination of the Militant Liberty program.

Defense Secretary Charles Wilson thought so highly of Broger's concept that he advocated disseminating the Militant Liberty concept to the American public via mass media. As a result, there was substantial coordination throughout the 1950s and 1960s between the JCS and media producers to incorporate Militant Liberty themes into Hollywood films. Among these actors, writers and producers were Merian Cooper, Ward Bond, and John Ford - a former chief of the Field Photographic Branch in the Office of Strategic Services (OSS). Ford said to have incorporated the Militant Liberty Concept into his 1957 film, "The Wings of Eagles" starring John Wayne.
