= WITG =

WITG may refer to:

- Lasikin Airport (ICAO code WITG)
- WITG-LP, a low-power radio station (104.7 FM) licensed to Ocala, Florida, United States
