= DZRK =

Radio station in Quezon, Palawan

Radyo Kapitbisig (DZRK)
- Quezon; Philippines
- Broadcast area: Central Palawan
- Frequency: 106.3 MHz
- Branding: DZRK 106.3 Radyo Kapitbisig

Programming
- Languages: Filipino, English
- Format: Community radio, Religious radio

Ownership
- Owner: Far East Broadcasting Company

History
- First air date: February 12, 2014
- Call sign meaning: Radyo Kapitbisig

Technical information
- Licensing authority: NTC
- Power: 5,000 watts

Links
- Website: dzrk.febc.ph

DZRK (106.3 FM) Radyo Kapitbisig is a radio station owned and operated by the Far East Broadcasting Company. The station's studio is located in Luke Society Palawan, Brgy. Poblacion, Quezon, Palawan.
