= XHLB-FM =

Radio station in Jamay–La Barca, Jalisco, Mexico

- Jamay, Jalisco; Mexico
- Broadcast area: La Barca
- Frequency: 104.7 FM
- Branding: Candela

Programming
- Format: Regional Mexican
- Affiliations: Cadena RASA

Ownership
- Owner: Radio La Barca, S.A.

History
- First air date: July 27, 1949 (concession)
- Call sign meaning: La Barca

Technical information
- Licensing authority: CRT
- Class: AA
- ERP: 6 kW
- HAAT: 85.22 m (279.6 ft)
- Transmitter coordinates: 20°17′31″N 102°36′27″W

Links
- Webcast: Listen live
- Website: cadenarasa.com

XHLB-FM is a radio station on 104.7 FM in Jamay, Jalisco, Mexico, serving La Barca. It is known as Candela and affiliated to Cadena RASA.

== History ==
XELB-AM 1090 received its concession on July 27, 1949. It was a 250-watt daytimer until the 1990s, when it upgraded to 5 kW day and 1 kW night.

XELB was authorized for AM-FM migration in 2011.
