= DZFE =

- Pasig; Philippines
- Broadcast area: Mega Manila and surrounding areas
- Frequency: 98.7 MHz (HD Radio)
- Branding: 98.7 DZFE

Programming
- Language: English
- Format: Classical Music, Religious
- Subchannels: HD1: DZFE analog; HD2: DZAS; HD3: Now XD

Ownership
- Owner: Far East Broadcasting Company
- Sister stations: 702 DZAS

History
- First air date: June 1, 1954 (AM band); 1970s (FM band)
- Former frequencies: 1030 kHz (1954–1972)
- Call sign meaning: Far East Broadcasting Company

Technical information
- Licensing authority: NTC
- Class: A, B and C
- Power: 20,000 watts
- ERP: 60,000 watts

Links
- Webcast: ph-icecast-win.eradioportal.com:8000/febc_dzfe
- Website: dzfe.febc.ph

DZFE (98.7 FM) is a non-commercial radio station owned and operated by the Far East Broadcasting Company (Philippines). The station's studio and transmitter are located on the 46th floor of One Corporate Centre, Meralco Ave. cor. Doña Julia Vargas Ave., Ortigas Center, Pasig.

== History ==
=== 1954–1972: Early history ===
DZFE was the second radio station established by American missionaries, who founded the first station (DZAS) of Far East Broadcasting Company in 1948. FEBC's mission of bringing "Christ to the World by Radio" was first directed toward China. However, in 1954, FEBC stepped forward to answer a government bid for the establishment of a classical music station.

On June 1, 1954, DZFE marked its inaugural broadcast. It aired from 6pm to 8pm, playing motets and chorales from Strauss II, Rimsky-Korsakov, a Filipino musical (My Nipa Hut), and Bach, at a frequency of 1030 kilohertz.

Initially, the broadcast comprised sequenced music; programming provided by the network's English Service was brought in to augment the material. DZFE debuted its first full day of broadcast on April 4, 1961, signing on at 5AM and signing off at 11PM.

John Hubbard became the station's new director in 1963. He had previously led the music faculty of Westmont College in California, and gave DZFE's programming the educational impetus and Gospel-centered worldview it possesses to the present day. In 1965, DZFE's staff acquired its second member with the addition of Joy Dulaca, née Abiera, a music graduate of Silliman University in Dumaguete, who took over the leadership of the station in 1975 when Hubbard returned to the United States.

=== 1972–1997: Martial Law and People Power Revolution ===
In the 70s, DZFE moved to the FM band though 98.7 MHz due to the act which is called ownership restriction that doesn't allow 2 AM stations in the same franchise in the same location. In 1976, it reduced its broadcast to six hours a day, going on the air from 4PM to midnight. It expanded back to its regular broadcast hours a few years later.

During the 1986 People Power Revolution, the operators of Catholic owned Radio Veritas, who were operating as "Radyo Bandido" to give people information about movements around Camp Crame and Camp Aguinaldo, briefly considered asking to use DZFE's transmitter in Bulacan after Marcos' soldiers had knocked out their tower. However, they decided it was instead better to request access to the transmitter of DZRJ in Sta. Mesa, which was closer.

Later that year, it reduced its broadcast once again by going off the air from noon to 6PM. It reclaimed the said broadcast hours the following year.

=== 1997–2012: Move to Makati and 9/11 aftermath ===
In 1997, under the helm of Ma. Teresa "Rexey" Domingo, DZFE transferred its office and studio from the FEBC Compound in Karuhatan, Valenzuela to Cityland 10 Tower 1 in Makati. This was to move the station closer to its listeners, many of whom resided in the latter area.

Dan Andrew Cura assumed management of the station in 2000. He left to take on other responsibilities within the FEBC network in 2002, and was succeeded by Maribel Fernandez. The withdrawal of foreign subsidies following September 11 attacks, in addition to other fiscal difficulties, spurred a decision to reduce the broadcast by 40% in 2003, going on the air in the morning and evening six days a week.

The management of the station was entrusted to current station manager Tiffany Liong-Gabuya in 2004, who assumed full management of the station the following year. That year, owing to the proliferation of tall buildings around its Makati antenna, DZFE transferred its transmitting facilities to a leased site in Crestview Subd., Antipolo, Rizal (a site formerly shared with commercial stations, UNTV-37 and DWNU, all owned by Progressive Broadcasting Corporation; now used by Radio Philippines Network for digital TV broadcasts), and its transmitting power attenuated from 20 kW to 5 kW, in order to control power costs.

In 2006, DZFE reclaimed 10 hours of the broadcast week, restoring quality programming to the 10PM to midnight block. In June 2008, it extended its broadcast back to 18 hours a day, 6 days a week. In January 2010, it completed its return to its daily 18-hour broadcasts.

The station also regained signal strength. In April 2009, DZFE began broadcast from a newly purchased Nautel NV20 transmitter, entirely funded by donations from local and foreign FEBC supporters, and is the first of its kind in the Philippines. It upgraded its transmitting power to 10 kW.

=== 2012–present: Move to Ortigas ===
The station once more relocated its office, studio and transmitting facilities in June and July 2012, this time to Ortigas Center, Pasig. Off air for a few days from June 21 for the move, the station began broadcasting on July 2 from the 46th floor of One Corporate Center. The relocation was part of a larger migration that involved the transfer of FEBC's main offices and the office and studio of its sister station, 702 DZAS, to Pasig from Valenzuela; while its archived and miscellaneous contents were also transferred to FEBC's shortwave facilities in Bocaue, Bulacan. After the transfer, it upgraded its transmitting power once again to 20 kW.

In June 2013, after years of working through several backroom issues, DZFE's broadcast became available outside the Greater Metro Manila area through online streaming. In September 2013, DZFE expanded its schedule to a 21-hour-a-day daily broadcast, the longest schedule DZFE has maintained in its history.

Since July 2017, DZFE has been available as an audio simulcast via Cignal TV Channel 314.

== HD Radio operations ==
At present, 98.7 DZFE is also test broadcast via digital HD Radio via the HD1 channel. The HD2 channel carries a simulcast of sister AM station DZAS.

Previously, the HD3 channel carried Now XD, a Christian music-formatted digital HD Radio and internet station owned by FEBC. Prior to Now XD, FEBC launched a similar Christian music block under the title Now Radio, which used to be aired from 10PM to midnight in the early 2000s.
