= Preet Didbal =

American politician

Preet Didbal is the former mayor of Yuba City, California. She was elected in 2017 and was the first Sikh female mayor in the United States. Her period of office was 2017-2018.

== Early life ==
Preet graduated from Yuba City High School and California State University in Sacramento. She received a master's degree in public administration (MPA) from the University of San Francisco.
