= DYVS =

Radio station in Bacolod, Philippines

- Bacolod; Philippines
- Broadcast area: Northern Negros Occidental and surrounding areas
- Frequency: 1233 kHz
- Branding: 1233 DYVS

Programming
- Languages: Hiligaynon, Filipino, English
- Format: News, Public Affairs, Talk, Religious Radio

Ownership
- Owner: Far East Broadcasting Company

History
- First air date: 1970 (as DYGS); September 29, 1974 (as DYVS)
- Former call signs: DYGS (1970-1974)
- Call sign meaning: The Sweet Voice of Salvation

Technical information
- Licensing authority: NTC
- Power: 10,000 watts

Links
- Website: dyvs.febc.ph

DYVS (1233 AM) is a radio station owned and operated by the Far East Broadcasting Company. Its studio is located at the Ground Floor, Smile Bldg., #79 San Sebastian St. cor. Verbena St., Bacolod, and its transmitter are located at Brgy. Taloc, Bago, Negros Occidental.

== History ==
It started as DYGS-AM in San Miguel, Jordan, Guimaras in 1970 with a power of 1000 watts on 1250 Khz. It serves the whole Guimaras island, Metro Iloilo and Metro Bacolod. But due to frequent power failure at the time while the infrastructure wasn't good. DYGS-AM 1250 Khz advertisers struggle to secure financial stability. After years operating from Jordan Guimaras. The station transferred to Bacolod City and changes has been made. In 1974, DYGS-AM change its call letters to DYVS-AM and its frequency change to adopt to the 9khz step AM realignments.
