= DXSM =

Radio station in Sulu, Philippines

Radyo Pilipinas Jolo (DXSM)
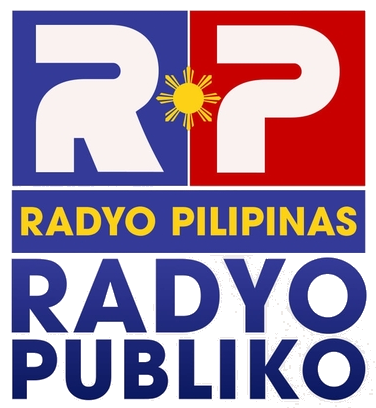
- Jolo; Philippines
- Broadcast area: Sulu
- Frequency: 774 kHz
- Branding: Radyo Pilipinas

Programming
- Languages: Filipino, Tausug
- Format: News, Public Affairs, Talk, Government Radio
- Network: Radyo Pilipinas

Ownership
- Owner: Presidential Broadcast Service
- Sister stations: Radyo Pilipinas Tawi Tawi

Technical information
- Licensing authority: NTC
- Power: 1,000 watts

DXSM (774 AM) Radyo Pilipinas is a radio station owned and operated by Presidential Broadcast Service. The station's studio is located in Camp Asturias, Brgy. Asturias, Jolo, Sulu.
