= California Dried Plum Festival =

Festival held in Yuba City, California, US

California Prune Festival (1988–2000) California Dried Plum Festival (2001–2002)
- Founded: 1988
- Type: Fruit Festival
- Purpose: Dried Plums
- Location: Yuba City, California
- Region served: California
- Key people: Sunsweet Growers Incorporated

The California Dried Plum Festival, formerly the California Prune Festival, was an annual festival held in Yuba City, California, between 1988 and 2002.

Its September 2002, edition included a freestyle disc tournament organized by the Freestyle Players Association.

The name change in 2001 from California Prune Festival to California Dried Plum Festival provoked some amused comments from onlookers.

== Parade ==
Every year, on the Friday before the two-day weekend festival began, the Prune Parade would take place in the downtown district of Yuba City on Plumas Street. Community groups, businesses, and local schools would participate in creating floats for the parade.
