= XHRLK-FM =

Radio station in Atlacomulco, State of Mexico, Mexico

- Atlacomulco, State of México; Mexico
- Frequency: 104.7 MHz
- Branding: Súper Stereo Miled

Programming
- Format: Mexican

Ownership
- Owner: Grupo Miled; (Miled FM, S.A. de C.V.)

History
- Former frequencies: 1340 AM; 1170 AM
- Call sign meaning: Radio Libien Kahue

Technical information
- ERP: 6,000 watts
- HAAT: -26.5 meters
- Transmitter coordinates: 19°47′39″N 99°52′27″W

Links
- Webcast: Listen live
- Website: miled.com

XHRLK-FM is a radio station in Atlacomulco, State of Mexico, Mexico.

== History ==
XERLK-AM 1340 received its concession on July 30, 1973. It has always been owned by Miled Libien Kahue, though it has moved frequencies twice. In the 1990s, it moved to 1170 kHz, allowing it to go from 500 watts as a daytimer to 1,000 watts and 250 at night. It then migrated to FM in 2011 as XHRLK-FM 104.7.
