= XHRGO-FM =

Radio station in Tala, Mexico

- Tala, Jalisco; Mexico
- Frequency: 104.7 FM
- Branding: Radio Cañaveral

Ownership
- Owner: Julián Orozco González

History
- First air date: July 20, 1999 (permit)
- Call sign meaning: ORozco GOnzález

Technical information
- Licensing authority: CRT
- Class: A
- ERP: 3 kW
- HAAT: -64.3 m
- Transmitter coordinates: 20°39′21″N 103°41′56″W

XHRGO-FM is a noncommercial radio station on 104.7 FM in Tala, Jalisco, Mexico, known as Radio Cañaveral.

== History ==
XHRGO received its permit on July 20, 1999.

In 2009, Orozco González, the permitholder, was fined by the RTC for playing narcocorridos.
