= Saved Media =

Digital media brand in Quezon City

SAVED Media
Programming
- Format: Religious Radio, Podcast

Ownership
- Owner: Christ's Heritage Church

History
- First air date: February 6, 2011 (FM radio); December 2017 (full-time online radio service); October 2024 (digital-only media brand)

Links
- Website: saved.ph

SAVED Media (formerly SAVED Radio) is a Strict Baptist Christian-oriented digital media brand based in Quezon City, Philippines. SAVED was originated in 2011 as a non-denominational Contemporary Christian music block, and later as an online radio service, by Becca Music Inc., a non-profit events production company founded by Rebecca Sy, which produces various concerts dedicated to Christian music. The brand has since transferred ownership twice in its history following Becca Music's closure: first, to FEBC Philippines in 2022; and later, in October 2024, to Christ's Heritage Church.

== History ==
=== Blocktime Programming with Energy FM ===
Saved Radio first aired on February 6, 2011, via UBSI's Energy FM as a Sunday evening program titled Saved on Energy FM (with its then-flagship DWKY 91.5 FM carrying the program between 8pm to 12mn). When the show transferred to DWET, it expanded into a four-hour radio show, then to six hours a few months after. By 2014, Becca Music renamed the show as SAVED Radio on Energy FM, along with a new lineup of programs for each hour including a portion entitled "The Worship Hour".

In mid-2015, SAVED Radio expanded its airtime to 18 hours on Sundays and introduced new programs with radio jocks hired separately from the Energy FM roster. SAVED Radio became full-time a few weeks later, when it occupied the remaining Sunday airtime of Energy FM's programming. However, it continues to operate as a block time show on Energy FM and not as a separate broadcaster. Also, despite its expansion in Manila, SAVED Radio remained to be a late-night Sunday show on Energy FM's provincial stations.

=== Transition to online radio, FEBC takeover ===
On December 24, 2017, through Saved Radio's Facebook page, Becca Music announced that Saved Radio would temporarily leave the FM radio band after December 31. An upcoming return to FM radio by 2018 was announced but did not occur. Becca Music continues a daily online streaming service on the Saved Radio website. By New Year's Day 2018, Saved Radio converted into an online radio service, while ENERGY FM reoccupied the network's Sunday lineup, the first after two years.

In November 2022, SAVED MEDIA Incorporated was formed by FEBC Philippines to take over the leadership of SAVED Radio from Becca Music, which officially closed its operations at the end of 2023. FEBC then merged the brand with its in-house Now XD brand. SAVED Radio, which became the surviving entity of the merger, continued its streaming audio service through its dedicated website and mobile application under FEBC ownership.

=== Podcast title under CHC ===
On July 31, 2024, Saved Radio announced on social media that its audio livestream was shut down, citing financial difficulties as an after effect of the COVID-19 pandemic which affected both Becca Music and FEBC Philippines. Its past podcast episodes continued to be available for its listeners.

On October 20, 2024, Christ's Heritage Church, a Quezon City-based Baptist church congregation, took over the ownership of the said outlet. Since the takeover, Saved Media shifted from non-denominational to a denominational podcast brand, in line with CHC's adherence to the Second London Confession of Faith doctrine of 1689.

== Content ==
The Saved Media podcast discusses Christian-related topics. Under Christ's Heritage Church management, episodes are streamed live bi-weekly through Saved Media's Facebook page.

Under previous ownership of Becca Music and FEBC Philippines, Saved Radio featured interviews and live sessions with Christian artists who held concerts in the Philippines. Guests who were invited by SAVED Radio included Kristian Stanfill, David Crowder, Hillsong United, Hillsong Worship, Mayumi Gomez (former lead singer of Imago), Rivers & Robots, and Pat Barrett.
