= XHCNE-FM =

Radio station in Cananea, Sonora, Mexico

- Cananea, Sonora; Mexico
- Frequency: 104.7 FM
- Branding: La Poderosa

Programming
- Format: Regional Mexican

Ownership
- Owner: Grupo Radiorama; (Radio Cananea, S.A. de C.V.)

History
- First air date: August 16, 1994 (concession)
- Call sign meaning: "Cananea"

Technical information
- Licensing authority: CRT
- Class: B1
- ERP: 15 kW
- HAAT: 75.9 m (249 ft)
- Transmitter coordinates: 30°58′56.8″N 110°17′36.0″W

Links
- Webcast: XHCNE-FM

XHCNE-FM is a radio station on 104.7 FM in Cananea, Sonora. It is owned by Grupo Radiorama and known as La Poderosa, carrying a Regional Mexican format.

== History ==
XHCNE received its concession on August 16, 1994. The station was owned by Ángel Mario Borja Navarrete, who sold XHCNE and XHRCL-FM in San Luis Río Colorado to Grupo ACIR. When ACIR sold many of its stations to Radiorama, Radiorama then transferred operations of many of its stations in the state to Grupo Larsa Comunicaciones in 2011; this station reverted to Radiorama control in 2021.
