= Yuba City, California =

City in California, United States

Yuba City, California Yubu
- City
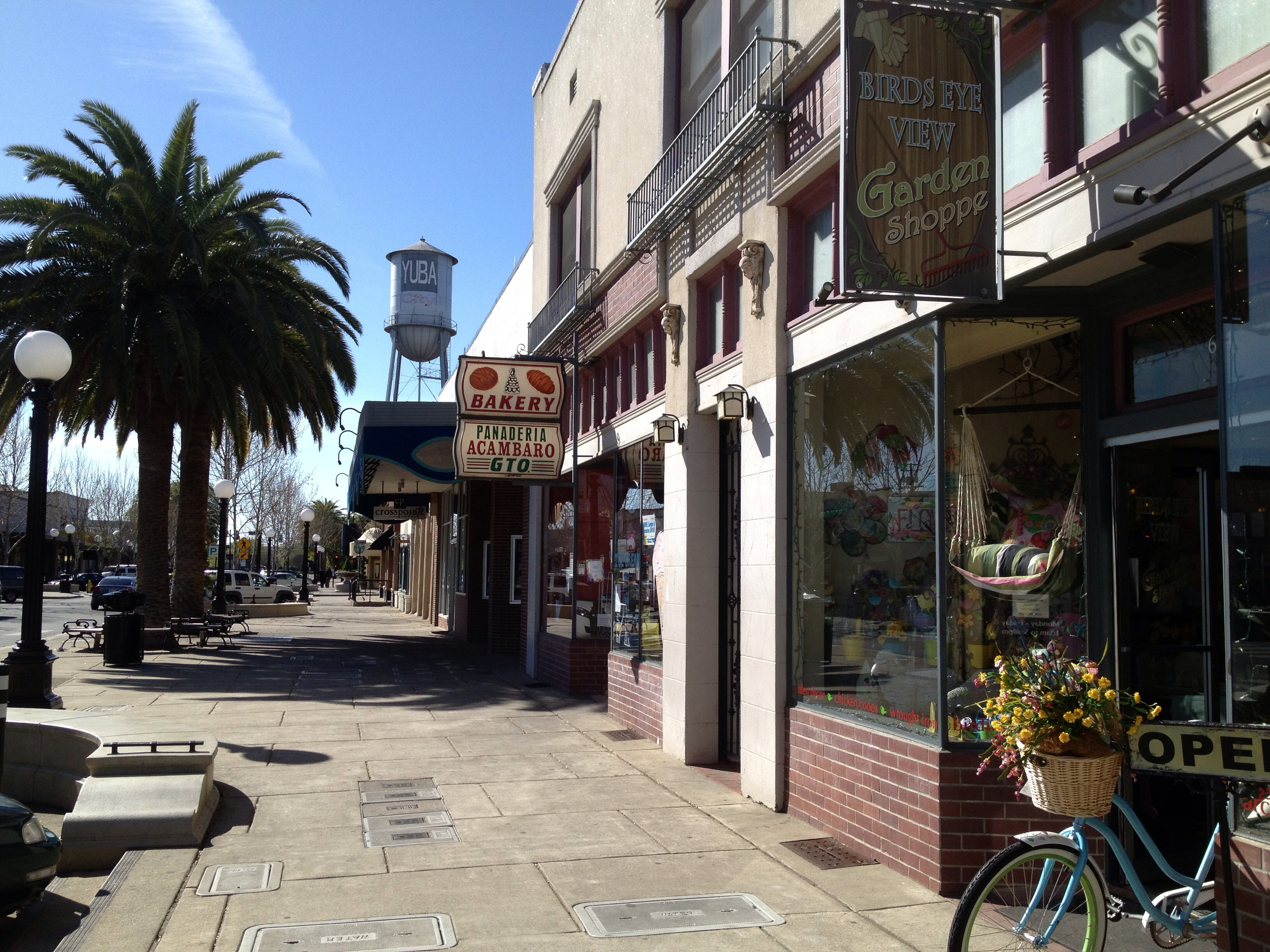
- Downtown Yuba

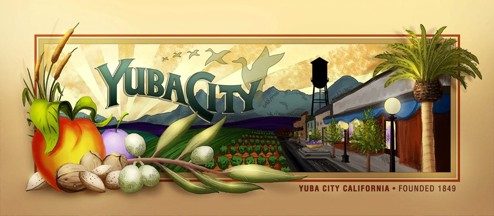
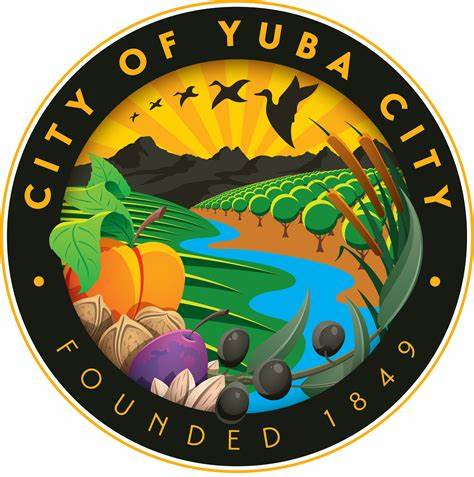
- Flag Seal
- Interactive map of Yuba City, California
- Location in the United States Yuba City (California) Yuba City (the United States)
- Coordinates: 39°8′5″N 121°37′34″W
- Country: United States
- State: California
- County: Sutter
- Incorporated: January 23, 1908

Government
  - Type: Council-Manager
  - Mayor: David Shaw

Area
  - Total: 15.06 sq mi (39.00 km^{2})
  - Land: 14.98 sq mi (38.80 km^{2})
  - Water: 0.077 sq mi (0.20 km^{2}) 0.52%
- Elevation: 59 ft (18 m)

Population (2020)
  - Total: 70,117
  - Density: 4,680/sq mi (1,807/km^{2})
- Time zone: UTC-8 (Pacific)
  - Summer (DST): UTC-7 (PDT)
- ZIP codes: 95991–95993
- Area code: 530, 837
- FIPS code: 06-86972
- GNIS feature ID: 1660222
- Website: yubacity.net

Yuba City (Maidu: Yubu) is a city in and the county seat of Sutter County, California, United States. The population was 70,117 at the 2020 census. Yuba City is the principal city of the Yuba City Metropolitan Statistical Area which encompasses all of Sutter County and Yuba County. The metro area's population is 164,138. It is the 21st largest metropolitan area in California, ranked behind Redding and Chico. Its metropolitan statistical area is part of the Greater Sacramento CSA.

== History ==
=== Early history ===
The Maidu people were settled in the region when they were first encountered by Spanish and Mexican scouting expeditions in the early 18th century. One version of the origin of the name "Yuba" is that during one of these expeditions, wild grapes were seen growing by a river, and so it was named "Uba", a variant spelling of the Spanish word uva (grape). On the map of the area made by Jean Jacques Vioget in 1841, a Maidu rancheria called Buba, noted in Stephen Powers' 1877 book The Tribes of California as the village of Yú-ba, was located at the present site of Yuba City.

The Mexican government granted a large expanse of land, which included the area in which Yuba City is situated, to John Sutter—the same John Sutter upon whose land gold was subsequently discovered in 1848. He sold part of this tract to some enterprising men who wished to establish a town near the confluence of the Yuba River and the Feather River, tributaries of the Sacramento River, with an eye to developing a commercial center catering to the thousands of gold miners headed upstream to the gold fields. At the same time, another town was developing on the eastern bank of the Feather River, the beginnings of what later would become Marysville.

By 1852, Yuba City was a steamboat landing, had one hotel, a grocery store, a post office, and approximately 20 dwelling homes with a population of about 150.

Yuba City was chosen as county seat for Sutter County in 1854. The same year, however, voters decided that Nicolaus would be a better location, and the county seat was moved there. County voters returned to their first choice of Yuba City two years later, in 1856, and it has remained the county seat since.

Yuba City saw its first major influx of population after World War II, pushing residential areas west and south from the city's original center. Orchards were turned into residential areas as new homes were built for people migrating to the city.

=== The Flood of 1955 ===
In December 1955, a series of storms dropped torrential rain throughout northern California. The deluge caused all the rivers in the region to overflow their banks and to break through levees. The Christmas Eve levee break at Yuba City was particularly disastrous, with 38 people losing their lives, and heavy damage occurring in the downtown section. According to Dick Brandt, manager of the Yuba County airport in 1955, between 550 and 600 Sutter County residents were rescued from the floodwater by helicopter.

=== The Yuba City Chickens ===
Sometime between the 1950s and the 1970s, a livestock auction was abandoned near the current movie theater, leaving roosters and chickens behind. The roosters and chickens eventually escaped and made their new home in the surrounding area near Franklin Road and Highway 99. There have been attempts to relocate the chickens, but the residents of Yuba City have always shut them down, as the chickens have become a staple and the unofficial mascots of the town.

=== The 1961 B-52 airplane crash ===
On March 14, 1961, a Boeing B-52 Stratofortress carrying nuclear weapons, flying near Yuba City, encountered a pressurization problem, and had to drop to a lower altitude. Because of this, more fuel than expected was used, and the aircraft ran out of fuel. It crashed before meeting with a tanker aircraft. The pilot gave the bailout command, and the crew egressed at 10,000 ft, except for the pilot, who ejected at 4,000 ft, while avoiding a populated area. The aircraft was destroyed. The weapons, two Mark 39 (3.8 megatons each) thermonuclear bombs (identified from declassified Department of Energy films and photographs) were destroyed on impact though no explosion took place, and there was no release of radioactive material as a result.

=== The 1976 school bus crash ===
On May 21, 1976, a school bus carrying members of the Yuba City High School's choir to a performance at Miramonte High School in Orinda, California plunged 28 feet off the exit ramp on I-680 at Marina Vista Road in Martinez, California. Twenty-seven students and one adult chaperone died and twenty-three students were seriously injured.

=== The 1978 missing person case ===
On February 24, 1978, five young men from Yuba City, Gary Dale Mathias, Jack Madruga, Jackie Huett, Theodore (Ted) Weiher and William Sterling, aged between 24 and 32 years, disappeared under mysterious circumstances. They went to a basketball game in Chico and on their way back drove up to a mountain road away from the main road back to Yuba, where their car had been found later, undamaged and with enough gas to drive back to Yuba City.

Four of the men were later found in and near a trailer on June 4 of the same year. Ted Weiher was found inside the trailer, starved, covered in blankets. Inside the trailer there was enough food to supply all five men for about a year, and enough paper and wood to light a fire, but nothing was used this way. The corpses and bones of three of the other men were found outside the trailer, but Gary Mathias was never found.

=== The 1994 mosque burning ===
Yuba City has been home to a significant Muslim population, including Pakistani Americans descended from c. 1902 immigrants. In 1994 the Muslim community completed a mosque that cost an estimated $1.8 million and many hours of donated work. Soon after, the mosque was destroyed by an act of arson, the first time that a mosque was destroyed in the United States. Eventually the mosque was rebuilt with help of Sikhs, Mormons, Christians, and other groups. The story is told in the 2012 documentary An American Mosque.

=== The 2020 police brutality incident ===
On April 12, 2020, a retired 64 year old veteran named Gregory Gross was assaulted by Yuba City police officers Joshua Jackson, Scott Hansen and Nathan Livingston after they had charged Gross for driving while intoxicated. Gross was handcuffed and compliant at the time of the incident. After twisting his arm and stating that he was now using "pain compliance techniques," Jackson proceeded to throw Gross face first into the ground, severing his vertebrae and leaving him permanently paralyzed. Jackson was afterwards allowed to retire, while Hansen and Livingston remained officers with the Yuba City Police Department. No charges have been brought against any of the officers, despite body camera video emerging which captured the prolonged abuse of the handcuffed senior citizen.

In 2022, after several surgeries and years of physical therapy, Gross sued the police department, ultimately winning a $20 million settlement, which was one of the largest such settlements in U.S. history.

== Geography ==
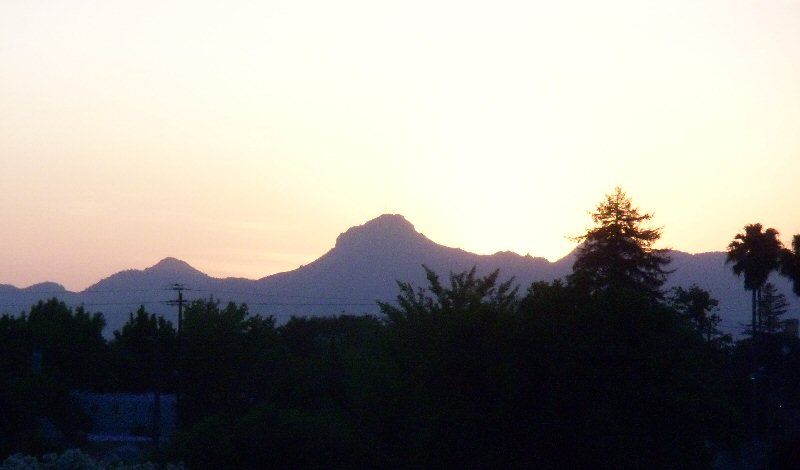
Sutter Buttes seen from Yuba City

Yuba City is located at 39°8'5" North, 121°37'34" West (39.134792, −121.626201).

According to the United States Census Bureau, the city has a total area of 15.1 square miles (39.1 km^{2}), of which 15.0 square miles (38.8 km^{2}) is land and 0.1 square miles (0.26 km^{2}) is water. The total area is 0.52% water.

The Yuba City area is located 40 miles (64 km) north of Sacramento and situated in the Sacramento Valley. It is home to the Sutter Buttes, the smallest mountain range in the world. The Feather River borders the city to the east and the area is sometimes referred to as the "Feather River Valley", which divides the city from its neighbor Marysville.

== Climate ==
Yuba City has a hot-summer mediterranean climate (Csa according to the Köppen climate classification system) which consists of cool, wet winters and hot, dry summers. On average, January is the coolest and wettest month, and July is the hottest and driest. During the wet season from mid-October to mid-April, Yuba City sees frequent rain and is usually under the tule fog. Snow is rare in the valley, but cold waves from the north may bring some light snow and ice. Spring is wet in the beginning but becomes drier and warmer as summer months approach. May has some rain, but usually from thunderstorms rather than from winter storms. Rain is rare from June to September. The Delta Breeze, which comes from the Bay Area on summer nights, helps cool temperatures and adds humidity. At times the Delta Breeze is strong enough to bring coastal fog inland to the Sacramento Valley. Autumn starts out warm but becomes cooler, wetter, and foggier as the season progresses.

Climate data for Marysville, California (Yuba County Airport), 1991–2020 normals, extremes 2000–present
Month	Jan	Feb	Mar	Apr	May	Jun	Jul	Aug	Sep	Oct	Nov	Dec	Year
Record high °F (°C)	76 (24)	80 (27)	90 (32)	96 (36)	107 (42)	111 (44)	113 (45)	110 (43)	115 (46)	104 (40)	86 (30)	73 (23)	115 (46)
Mean maximum °F (°C)	67.7 (19.8)	72.5 (22.5)	78.7 (25.9)	89.1 (31.7)	96.9 (36.1)	106.5 (41.4)	106.9 (41.6)	105.1 (40.6)	102.8 (39.3)	90.8 (32.7)	78.3 (25.7)	66.1 (18.9)	108.4 (42.4)
Mean daily maximum °F (°C)	55.5 (13.1)	60.4 (15.8)	66.2 (19.0)	72.6 (22.6)	81.9 (27.7)	90.1 (32.3)	96.2 (35.7)	94.6 (34.8)	89.6 (32.0)	79.0 (26.1)	64.2 (17.9)	55.4 (13.0)	75.5 (24.2)
Daily mean °F (°C)	46.8 (8.2)	50.8 (10.4)	54.8 (12.7)	59.5 (15.3)	67.1 (19.5)	74.0 (23.3)	78.5 (25.8)	77.0 (25.0)	72.7 (22.6)	64.2 (17.9)	52.7 (11.5)	46.6 (8.1)	62.1 (16.7)
Mean daily minimum °F (°C)	38.2 (3.4)	41.1 (5.1)	43.4 (6.3)	46.4 (8.0)	52.4 (11.3)	57.9 (14.4)	60.7 (15.9)	59.5 (15.3)	55.7 (13.2)	49.4 (9.7)	41.3 (5.2)	37.7 (3.2)	48.6 (9.3)
Mean minimum °F (°C)	27.3 (−2.6)	30.3 (−0.9)	34.2 (1.2)	37.1 (2.8)	44.3 (6.8)	50.1 (10.1)	53.9 (12.2)	53.0 (11.7)	47.9 (8.8)	39.3 (4.1)	31.4 (−0.3)	25.8 (−3.4)	24.1 (−4.4)
Record low °F (°C)	9 (−13)	19 (−7)	26 (−3)	31 (−1)	35 (2)	42 (6)	45 (7)	45 (7)	37 (3)	32 (0)	24 (−4)	16 (−9)	9 (−13)
Average precipitation inches (mm)	3.81 (97)	3.65 (93)	2.92 (74)	1.40 (36)	0.93 (24)	0.28 (7.1)	0.00 (0.00)	0.05 (1.3)	0.11 (2.8)	1.03 (26)	2.21 (56)	3.68 (93)	20.07 (510.2)
Average precipitation days (≥ 0.01 in)	10.4	9.0	9.1	6.6	3.9	1.1	0.1	0.3	0.7	3.9	7.1	11.1	63.3
Source 1: NOAA
Source 2: National Weather Service (mean maxima/minima 2006–2020)

== Demographics ==
Historical population
Census	Pop.	Note	%±
1890	562		—
1910	1,160		—
1920	1,708		47.2%
1930	3,605		111.1%
1940	4,968		37.8%
1950	7,861		58.2%
1960	11,507		46.4%
1970	13,986		21.5%
1980	18,736		34.0%
1990	27,437		46.4%
2000	36,758		34.0%
2010	64,925		76.6%
2020	70,117		8.0%
2025 (est.)	69,485	▼	−0.9%
U.S. Decennial Census

=== 2020 census ===
As of the 2020 census, Yuba City had a population of 70,117. The population density was 4,680.7 inhabitants per square mile (1,807.2/km^{2}). The median age was 36.1 years. The age distribution was 25.4% under the age of 18, 9.2% aged 18 to 24, 26.4% aged 25 to 44, 23.5% aged 45 to 64, and 15.4% aged 65 or older. For every 100 females, there were 98.2 males, and for every 100 females age 18 and over, there were 95.6 males age 18 and over.

99.7% of residents lived in urban areas, while 0.3% lived in rural areas.

Racial composition as of the 2020 census
Race	Number	Percent
White	30,286	43.2%
Black or African American	1,680	2.4%
American Indian and Alaska Native	1,368	2.0%
Asian	15,629	22.3%
Native Hawaiian and Other Pacific Islander	242	0.3%
Some other race	12,163	17.3%
Two or more races	8,749	12.5%
Hispanic or Latino (of any race)	21,701	30.9%

There were 23,179 households, out of which 39.4% included children under the age of 18, 50.7% were married-couple households, 6.9% were cohabiting couple households, 25.6% had a female householder with no partner present, and 16.8% had a male householder with no partner present. 21.0% of households were one person, and 10.2% were one person aged 65 or older. The average household size was 2.99. There were 16,896 families (72.9% of all households).

The census reported that 99.0% of the population lived in households, 0.3% lived in non-institutionalized group quarters, and 0.7% were institutionalized.

There were 24,027 housing units at an average density of 1,603.9 units per square mile (619.3 units/km^{2}), of which 23,179 (96.5%) were occupied. Of these, 57.0% were owner-occupied and 43.0% were occupied by renters. Of all housing units, 3.5% were vacant. The homeowner vacancy rate was 0.9%, and the rental vacancy rate was 3.1%.

=== 2023 estimates ===
In 2023, the US Census Bureau estimated that 24.1% of the population were foreign-born. Of all people aged 5 or older, 61.5% spoke only English at home, 20.0% spoke Spanish, 15.7% spoke other Indo-European languages, 2.6% spoke Asian or Pacific Islander languages, and 0.2% spoke other languages. Of those aged 25 or older, 77.3% were high school graduates and 20.1% had a bachelor's degree.

The median household income was $72,322, and the per capita income was $33,563. About 13.2% of families and 15.6% of the population were below the poverty line.

== Transportation ==
Local bus service in Yuba City is provided by Yuba Sutter Transit.

The Amtrak Thruway 3 provides thrice daily connections from neighboring Marysville (with a stop at 858 I Street) to/from Sacramento and Stockton

The city is served by two highways. California State Route 20 is the major east–west route, running to Marysville to the east, and Williams to the west. California State Route 99 is the major north–south route, running south toward Sacramento, and north to Chico. State Route 99 is also the city's only freeway, running from State Route 20 to just north of Eager Road (exit 344) outside of the city.

== Economy ==
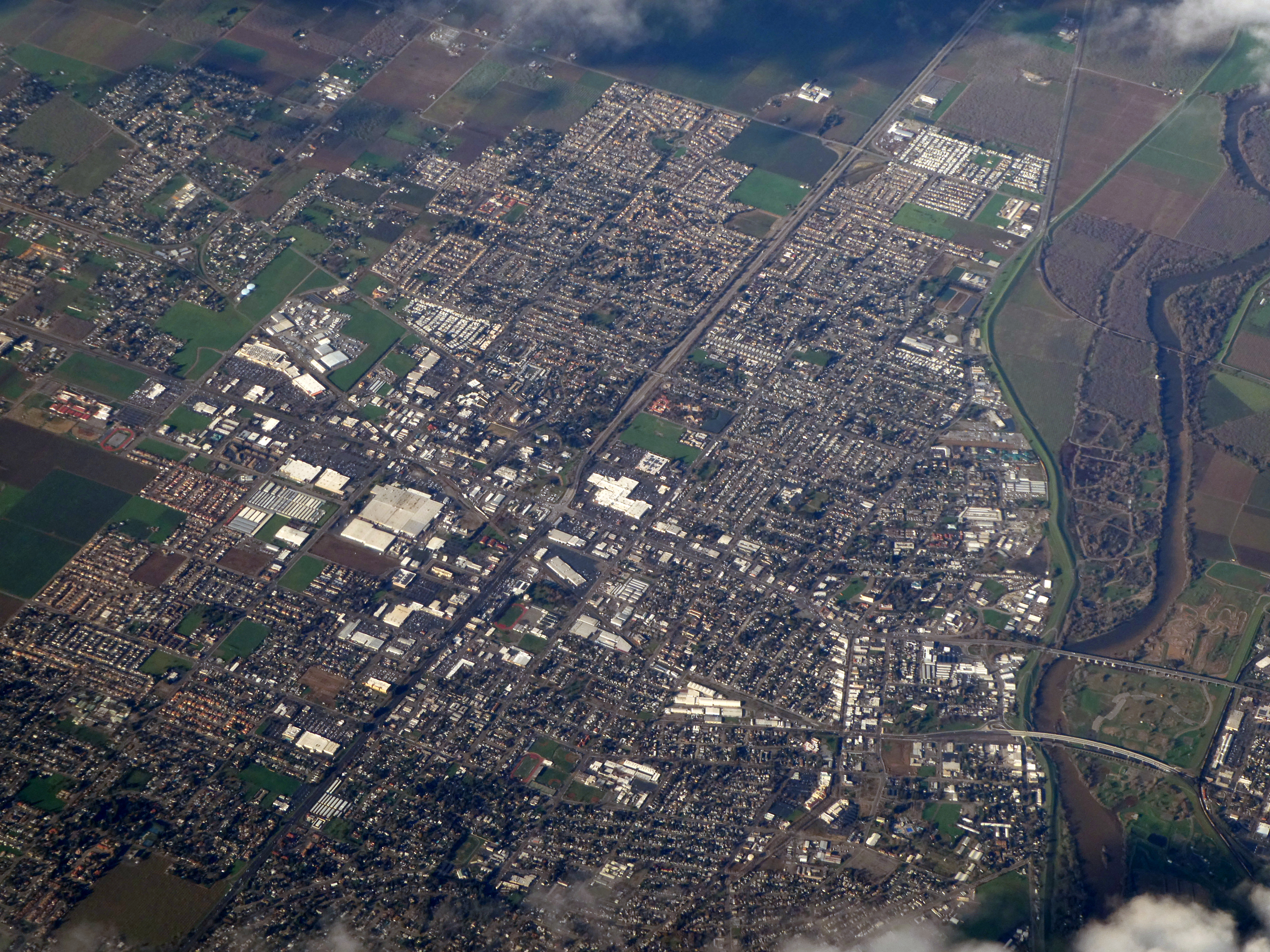
Aerial view of Yuba City

Yuba City is home to the largest dried fruit processing plant in the world, Sunsweet Growers Incorporated. In 1988 Yuba City was home to the California Prune Festival. In 2001 the name was changed to the California Dried Plum Festival and in early 2003 directors announced the end of the festival's 15-year run in the Yuba–Sutter area. This was primarily due to rise in costs, difficulty in securing sponsors, and competition from other festivals.

Being a small town, retail and healthcare make up the largest sectors of the economy. Some other notable employers include the Geweke Auto Group, Hilbers Incorporated, SharpeSoft, Jaeger Construction, Ardent Mills (formerly Andean Naturals) and Nordic Industries, Inc. Farming is also an important part of the Yuba–Sutter area. The unemployment rate in Yuba city is 8.20%.

=== Top employers ===
According to the city's 2022 Annual Comprehensive Financial Report, the top employers in the city are:

#	Employer	# of Employees
1	Yuba City Unified School District	1,358
2	Sutter County	959
3	Rush Personnel Services, Inc	661
4	Sunsweet Growers	600
5	Sutter North Medical Group	475
6	Walmart	400
7	City of Yuba City	321
8	Home Depot	300
10	Raley's/Bel Air	204
10	The Fountains	200

== Arts and culture ==
=== Annual events ===
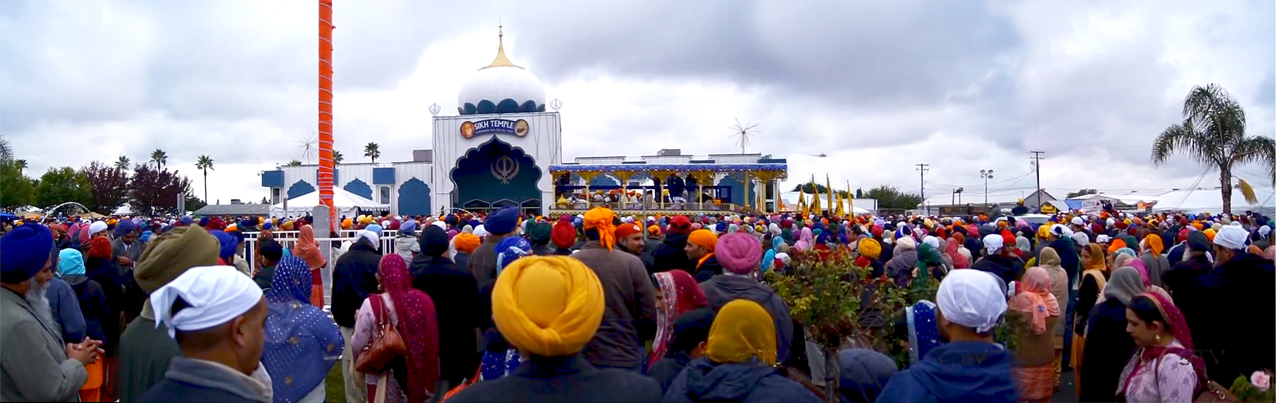
Nagar Kirtan parade 2011

==== Sikh Parade ====
Yuba City is known for its sizeable Sikh community. The Sikh population in the Yuba–Sutter area has grown to be one of the largest in the United States and one of the largest Sikh populations outside of the Punjab state of India. Each year on the first Sunday of November, Sikhs from the United States, Canada, India, the United Kingdom and throughout the world attend the Sikh parade in Yuba City, which commemorates the receipt by Sikhs of their Holy scripture, the Guru Granth Sahib, in 1708. The 4.5-mile-long (7.2 km) parade features floats and a procession of parade participants. The 2005 parade drew an estimated 56,000 people while the 2007 parade was estimated to draw between 75,000 and 85,000 people of both Sikh and non-Sikh background. In 2008, an estimated 80,000 people came out for the event which is now considered one of the largest gatherings in Northern California. In 2012, the parade participants rose to an estimated number of 150,000 people.

=== California Swan Festival ===
Yuba City participated in the California Swan Festival, which had been held from 2013 to 2016, November 13–15, with the events centered in adjacent Marysville’s Caltrans Building.

=== California Dried Plum Festival ===
Yuba City hosted the California Prune Festival from annually 1988 to 2000 with the name changed to the Dried Plum Festival in 2001 and its last year in 2002.

=== Museums and other points of interest ===
- Community Memorial Museum of Sutter County

== Government ==
In the California State Legislature, Yuba City is in the 1st senatorial district, represented by Republican Megan Dahle, and in the 3rd Assembly district, represented by Vacant.

In the United States House of Representatives, Yuba City is in California's 1st congressional district, represented by Republican James Gallagher.

Yuba City also elected the first Sikh American Mayor in the United States, Kash Gill, and Preet Didbal, the first Sikh American woman Mayor in the United States.

== Education ==
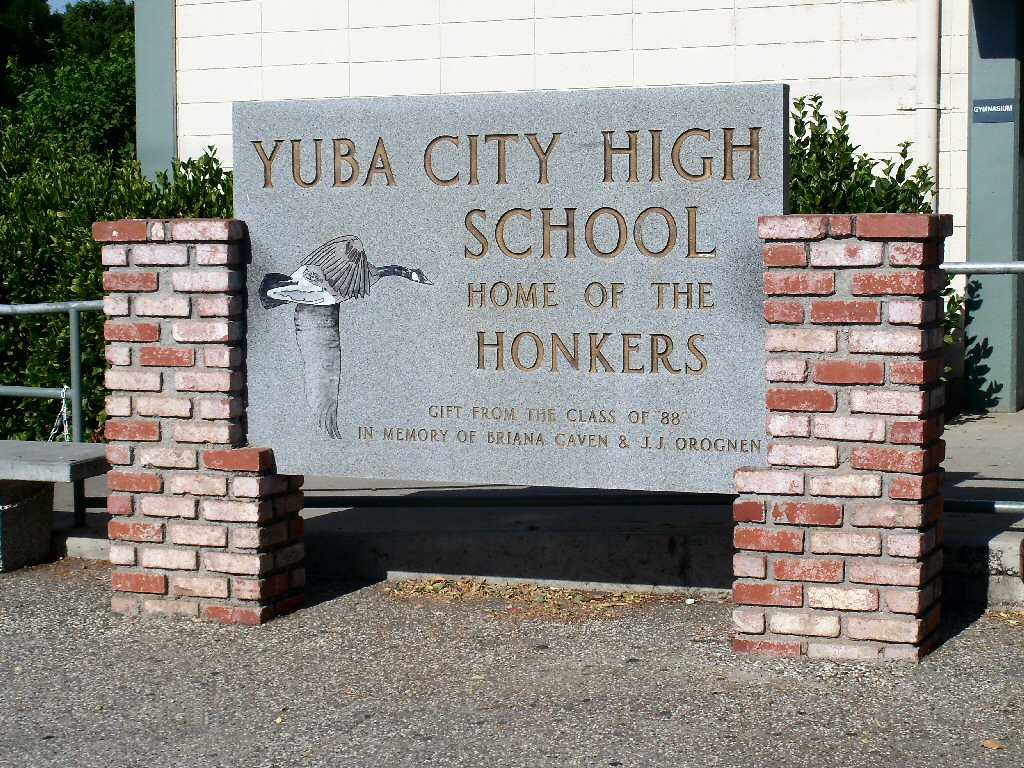

Public schools are part of the Yuba City Unified School District. The three high schools in the district are Yuba City High School, River Valley High School, and Albert Powell Continuation High School. Faith Christian High School and Adventist Christian School are private christian schools located in Yuba City. The Yuba City Charter School is K-12. Twin Rivers Charter is a K-8. St. Isidore Catholic School is a PK-8 parochial school under the auspices of St. Isidore Catholic Church.

Yuba City is in the Yuba Community College District and is served by Yuba Community College in neighboring Marysville.

== Media ==
The main newspaper for Yuba City area is the Appeal-Democrat. The newspaper is printed in Marysville, but serves the entire Yuba–Sutter area. The Sacramento Bee is also widely sold and read in Yuba City.

Although KKCY 103.1, KUBA 1600 AM and 98.1 FM, KETQ-LP 93Q, KKCY-HD2 95.5, KCYC-LP, KOBO, and KRYC-LP are the only radio stations within the city, there is a wide variety of others broadcasting nearby.

== Notable people ==
- Giovanni Aguilar, soccer player
- Josh Appelt, mixed martial artist
- Frank Bacon, actor
- Guy Branum, actor, comedian, podcaster, and writer
- Richard Buckner, singer-songwriter
- William Jennings Capell, heir presumptive to the Earldom of Essex
- Juan Corona, serial killer
- Marcie Dodd, singer and actress
- Cam Eden, Major League Baseball outfielder
- Wally Herger, politician, member of U.S. House of Representatives 1987–2012
- Brad Johnson, actor and real estate developer
- Brandun Lee, professional boxer
- Leanne Marshall, winner of Season 5 of Project Runway
- Adrian Molina, Academy Award-winning writer and director of Coco
- John Joseph Montgomery, aviation pioneer, was born in Yuba City
- Michael P. Moran, actor and screenplay writer
- Charlie Peacock, award-winning songwriter, recording artist, record producer – born Charles W. Ashworth
- Chris Petersen, University of Washington head football coach
- Darryl Scott, Los Angeles Angels pitcher
- Brock Stassi, Philadelphia Phillies first baseman
- Max Stassi, Los Angeles Angels catcher
- Rick Stephenson, bodybuilding champion and United States Army Ranger
- Charlotte Stewart, actress
- Preet Didbal, city mayor
- Tyler Rich, singer
- Ron Porter, NFL Kicker
- Yuba County Five, five men who went missing in 1978
- JJ White, country music duo

== Sister cities ==
- Toride, Ibaraki, Japan as determined by Sister Cities International.

== See also ==
- Yuba County, California
- Yuba–Sutter area
- Marysville, California
- Yuba City Astronomical Observatory
