= DZAS =

Radio station in Metro Manila, Philippines

- Pasig; Philippines
- Broadcast area: Mega Manila and surrounding areas
- Frequency: 702 kHz
- Branding: 702 DZAS

Programming
- Languages: Filipino, English, Chinese (Amoy dialect)
- Format: News, Public Affairs, Talk, Religious Radio
- Affiliations: GCTV (for DZAS-FEBC RadyoTV programming block)

Ownership
- Owner: Far East Broadcasting Company
- Sister stations: 98.7 DZFE

History
- First air date: June 4, 1948
- Former frequencies: 680 kHz (1948–1978)
- Call sign meaning: Airwaves of Salvation

Technical information
- Licensing authority: NTC
- Class: A (clear frequency)
- Power: 50,000 watts

Links
- Website: dzas.febc.ph

DZAS (702 AM) is a non-commercial radio station owned and operated by the Far East Broadcasting Company. The station's studio is located at the 46th Floor, One Corporate Centre, Meralco Avenue cor. Doña Julia Vargas Avenue, Ortigas Center, Pasig, and its transmitter is located along MacArthur Highway, Barangay Wakas, Bocaue, Bulacan. It operates daily from 4:40 am to 12:00 midnight.

Few of the station's programs are also aired on cable television via GCTV and TBN Philippines.

== Profile ==
The station began its broadcast on June 4, 1948, under the call letters KZAS, as the lyrics of the hymn “All Hail the Power of Jesus’ Name” wafted in the air for the first time, signaling the beginning of Gospel broadcasts in the country. KZAS eventually came to be known as 680 kilocycles (read "Six-Eighty") DZAS in the year 1948. In November 1978, DZAS moved to the present to frequency of 702 kHz in response to the adoption of the 9 kHz spacing implemented by the Geneva Frequency Plan of 1975 on AM radio stations in the Philippines and across the Asia-Pacific region. For seven decades now, (read "Seven-O-Two") 702 DZAS has been providing the Filipino household with news, music, information, and inspiration while sharing the Word of God. It is now one of the oldest radio stations still operating today.

702 DZAS, however, experienced a setback, when the it reduced its broadcast hours in November 2003, owing to its financial difficulties. In January 2004, the station resumed its regular broadcast hours.

In June 2012, DZAS and sister FM station 98.7 DZFE, moved to a new, modern office space located at the One Corporate Centre in Ortigas Center, Pasig to adjust to modern broadcast settings.

Recently, DZAS launched its TV/visual counterpart DZAS - FEBC RadyoTV, a programming block on pay TV channel GCTV.
