= KOOU =

- Hardy, Arkansas; United States
- Broadcast area: Salem, Arkansas
- Frequency: 104.7 MHz
- Branding: Hometown Radio

Programming
- Format: Country

Ownership
- Owner: KOOU, Incorporated

History
- First air date: 1993

Technical information
- Licensing authority: FCC
- Facility ID: 31839
- Class: A
- ERP: 5,400 watts
- HAAT: 93 meters (305 ft)
- Transmitter coordinates: 36°16′29″N 91°30′18″W

Links
- Public license information: Public file; LMS

KOOU (104.7 FM) is a radio station licensed to Hardy, Arkansas. The station broadcasts a country music format and is owned by KOOU, Incorporated.
