= KOMF-LP =

Coordinates: 39°46′20″N 104°58′58″W

Denver Open Media
- Denver, Colorado; United States
- Broadcast area: Denver metropolitan area
- Frequency: 92.9 MHz (HD Radio)
- Branding: Denver Open Media

Programming
- Format: Local artists/bands

Ownership
- Owner: Open Media Foundation

Technical information
- Licensing authority: FCC
- Translator: HD3: 89.3 K225BS (KUVO Denver)

Links
- Public license information: Open Media Public file; LMS
- Website: denveropenmedia.org

KOMF-LP (later K225BS, 92.9 FM) was a radio station that broadcast local artists/bands from Denver, Colorado operated by the Open Media Foundation under the branding of "Denver Open Media". The station carried mainly locally originated content from local musical artists, and from a membership base of approximately 500 local individuals and organizations who used Denver Open Media equipment and facilities to produce and broadcast shows on radio and cable television. The station was broadcast from the former yellow-cab dispatch antenna in the Taxi by Zeppelin development in the Riverside North region of downtown Denver and the signal served the downtown Denver region.

== History ==
On January 28, 2019, the parent organization of Denver Open Media, the Open Media Foundation requested the cancellation of its KOMF-LPFM license at 104.7FM. and Denver Open Media radio re-launched on 89.3HD3 and 92.9FM in partnership with KUVO.

In 2025, K225BS began acting as a translator for KVCU Radio 1190, the University of Colorado Boulder's student radio station.
