= WSGM =

- Tracy City, Tennessee; United States
- Broadcast area: Grundy County
- Frequency: 104.7 MHz

Programming
- Format: Gospel

Ownership
- Owner: Cumberland Communications Cooperative

Technical information
- Licensing authority: FCC
- Facility ID: 14730
- Class: A
- ERP: 1,000 watts
- HAAT: 167.0 meters
- Transmitter coordinates: 35°20′22.00″N 85°46′10.00″W

Links
- Public license information: Public file; LMS

WSGM (104.7 FM), is a radio station broadcasting from Tracy City, Tennessee broadcasting an all-gospel format.

WSGM is owned and operated by the Cumberland Communications Cooperation. The current president of the cooperation is Dr. Byron Harbolt, well known in the area for offering healthcare to patients for very low prices. WSGM Radio first went on the air in 1994, barely beating the Federal Communications Commission (FCC) deadline. The general manager at the time, Jerry Fletcher, conducted Grundy County's first radio broadcast which only lasted about 6 hours. All the music at the time was played off of a reel to reel machine.
