= KCYC-LP =

- Yuba City, California; United States
- Frequency: 104.7 MHz

Programming
- Format: Defunct (was Country music)

Ownership
- Owner: Sutter County Sheriff’s Reserve Association

History
- First air date: 2005
- Last air date: 2026

Technical information
- Licensing authority: FCC
- Facility ID: 124166
- Class: L1
- ERP: 91 watts
- HAAT: 31.3 meters (103 ft)
- Transmitter coordinates: 39°06′03″N 121°37′04″W

Links
- Public license information: LMS
- Webcast: Listen live
- Website: kc1047.com

KCYC-LP (104.7 FM) was a radio station broadcasting a country format licensed to Yuba City, California, United States. The station was owned by Sutter County Sheriff's Reserve Association.
