= KQBK =

- Waldron, Arkansas; United States
- Broadcast area: Fort Smith, Arkansas
- Frequency: 104.7 MHz
- Branding: Kool 104.7

Programming
- Format: Classic hits
- Affiliations: Jones Radio Network

Ownership
- Owner: Pharis Broadcasting, Inc,

History
- First air date: November 1, 1981

Technical information
- Licensing authority: FCC
- Facility ID: 71701
- Class: C2
- ERP: 50,000 watts
- HAAT: 150 meters
- Transmitter coordinates: 35°11′1″N 94°7′44″W

Links
- Public license information: Public file; LMS
- Webcast: Listen live
- Website: kool1047fm.com

KQBK (104.7 FM) is a radio station broadcasting a classic hits format. Licensed to Waldron, Arkansas, United States, it serves the Ft. Smith, Arkansas, area. The station is currently owned by Pharis Broadcasting, Inc.
