= KFLI =

- Des Arc, Arkansas; United States
- Broadcast area: Little Rock, Arkansas
- Frequency: 104.7 MHz
- Branding: Cool 104.7

Programming
- Format: Classic hits

Ownership
- Owner: Flinn Broadcasting, Inc, (Flinn Broadcasting, Inc.)

History
- First air date: 2002
- Call sign meaning: K FLInn (owners)

Technical information
- Licensing authority: FCC
- Facility ID: 88063
- Class: C3
- ERP: 25,000 watts
- HAAT: 100 meters (330 ft)
- Transmitter coordinates: 35°0′23″N 91°40′20″W

Links
- Public license information: Public file; LMS
- Webcast: Listen Live
- Website: arkansasradio.com

KFLI (104.7 FM, "Cool 104.7") is a radio station broadcasting a classic hits format. Licensed to Des Arc, Arkansas, United States, it serves the Little Rock, Arkansas, area. The station is currently owned by Flinn Broadcasting, Inc. Its studios are located in Searcy and the transmitter is in Bullard.
