= KSAI (AM) =

Radio station in Northern Mariana Islands (1978–2002)

- Saipan; United States
- Broadcast area: Northern Mariana Islands
- Frequency: 936 kHz
- Branding: 936 KSAI

Programming
- Format: Defunct (News, Talk, Religious Radio)

Ownership
- Owner: Far East Broadcasting Company
- Sister stations: KSAI-SW

History
- First air date: 1945
- Last air date: April 30, 2002
- Former frequencies: 1010 kHz (1945)
- Call sign meaning: SAIpan

Technical information
- Class: B
- Power: 5,000 watts

KSAI (936 AM) was a radio station owned by the Far East Broadcasting Company. Licensed to Susupe, Saipan, it served the greater Northern Mariana Islands area.

KSAI was on air from 1978 to 2002, when FEBC decided to focus on its shortwave station. Aside from airing religious programming, KSAI was also the first radio station on the island to air ethnic programming in Tagalog, Korean, and Chinese languages. Prior to 1978, KSAI was initially established by the United States Office of War Information in June 1945.

== Shortwave Broadcast ==
FEBC also operated a shortwave station from 1984 to 2011.
