= DXKI-AM =

Radio station in South Cotabato, Philippines

DXKI
- Koronadal; Philippines
- Broadcast area: South Central Mindanao
- Frequency: 1062 kHz
- Branding: 1062 DXKI

Programming
- Languages: Hiligaynon, Filipino, English
- Format: News, Public Affairs, Talk, Religious

Ownership
- Owner: Far East Broadcasting Company

History
- First air date: December 19, 1964
- Former frequencies: 1040 kHz (1964–1978)

Technical information
- Licensing authority: NTC
- Power: 5,000 watts

Links
- Website: dxki.febc.ph

DXKI (1062 AM) is a radio station owned and operated by the Far East Broadcasting Company. The station's studio and transmitter is located along National Highway, Brgy. Morales, Koronadal.
