= DXAS-AM =

Radio station in Zamboanga City, Philippines

DXAS
- Zamboanga City; Philippines
- Broadcast area: Zamboanga City, Basilan and surrounding areas
- Frequency: 1116 kHz
- Branding: 1116 DXAS

Programming
- Languages: Chavacano, Filipino, English
- Format: News, Public Affairs, Talk, Religious

Ownership
- Owner: Far East Broadcasting Company

History
- First air date: October 1969 (as DXJO)
- Former call signs: DXJO (1969–1972)
- Call sign meaning: Agapay ng Sambayanan

Technical information
- Licensing authority: NTC
- Power: 5,000 watts

Links
- Website: http://dxas.febc.ph

DXAS (1116 AM) is a radio station owned and operated by the Far East Broadcasting Company. The station's studio is located at the 3rd Floor, Phidco Bldg., Veterans Ave., Zamboanga City.
