= KELS-LP =

Low-power radio station in Greeley, Colorado

- Greeley, Colorado; United States
- Broadcast area: Ft. Collins, Colorado
- Frequency: 104.7 MHz

Programming
- Format: Variety

Ownership
- Owner: Plymouth Gathering Inc.

History
- First air date: 2005

Technical information
- Licensing authority: FCC
- Facility ID: 131356
- ERP: 61 watts
- HAAT: 38.4 meters (126 ft)
- Transmitter coordinates: 40°23′5″N 104°44′11″W

Links
- Public license information: LMS
- Webcast: Listen Live Link 1 Listen Live Link 2
- Website: pirate1047.com

KELS-LP (104.7 FM), also known as "The Pirate", is a low-power radio station licensed to Greeley, Colorado, United States. The station serves the Greeley - Ft. Collins area and is currently owned by Plymouth Gathering, Inc.

== History ==
KELS-LP received its license to cover on May 2, 2005, from a construction permit originating in 2003. The station became known as "Pirate Radio". The station airs programming from the 1940s through the 1980s, but has a Variety format.

== Controversy ==
In early 2011, the station aired a commentary regarding Martin Luther King Jr. that caused national controversy. The commentary was based on information provided by a listener regarding moral concerns with the civil rights leader. Though the commentary was reported to be generally factual and has been aired in previous years, the controversy developed because the station owner, Brett Reese was, at the time, a Greeley School Board member. Early in his school board tenure, Reese repeatedly declined to speak to the local newspaper, the Greeley Tribune, and instead offered an interview only if the reporter signed a contract agreeing to publish his comments verbatim and pay a $5,000 penalty if the comments were edited. The newspaper publicly declined the offer. In May 2011 Reese was publicly censured by the school board for being intoxicated at a board meeting and for allegedly inappropriately touching a teacher. He began carrying a weapon, as he was receiving death threats. A judge issued a permanent restraining order against Reese and permanently revoked his concealed weapon permit after a rival radio station owner alleged Reese threatened a "shootout" over advertisers. Reese claimed his remarks were misinterpreted. Reese resigned from the school board in February 2012.

Reese has repeatedly denied any racial intent and has voiced his support of the civil rights movement. Reese says that his intent is that the truth should be known regarding those that are held up as role models.

== Fine for running commercials ==
The station's operator, Plymouth Gathering, was fined $15,000 by the FCC in 2023 after losing an appeal regarding the unauthorized airing of over 1,600 commercial advertisements in 2018, which is prohibited for the station's noncommercial educational license.
