= 2BOB =

Coordinates: 31.908529°S 152.460966°E

- Taree, New South Wales, Australia; Australia
- Broadcast area: Mid North Coast
- Frequency: 104.7 MHz FM

Ownership
- Owner: Manning Media Co-operative

Technical information
- Class: Community

Links
- Website: http://www.2bobradio.org.au

2BOB FM radio is a volunteer radio station in Taree on the Mid North Coast of New South Wales, Australia. 2BOB FM broadcasts on 104.7 FM. This type of station is known as community radio, and 2BOB is a member of the Community Broadcasting Association of Australia (CBAA).

"BOB" is an acronym for "Broadcasting on (a) Budget". The radio station started out by receiving donations from members of the community and was known for hosting stalls at the local shows and "Radio-Thons" in order to gain funding.

The radio station has been broadcasting since the mid-1980s, starting with vinyl records and moving up to CDs. In 2005, the station sold its bandwidth frequency and made enough money to upgrade their broadcasting equipment.

The station has had shows frequently run by students from local schools, in particular Chatham High School and Taree High School. Many students trained with announcers and began hosting their own shows.

The station has had in its rotation such shows as The Breakfast Show, Lunchbox, School's Out (a show hosted by untrained students from local public and high schools - students were chaperoned by a trained announcer and would talk in between songs they chose to have broadcast), Drive Time, The Request Show and Midnight-To-Dawn.

2BOB also has a show called Stomparoom late on Sunday nights. The program plays metal, punk and rock etc. The show includes, 'feature album', 'joke track' and occasionally a show called 'Emo Hour', which was later renamed 'Punked up'. The show's hours are from eight at night until ten, but have been known, in the past, to go as late as five o'clock in the morning.

2BOB originally used its own presenters to read out the news, but later gained a feed from the Macquarie News Network. The local news is still written and spoken by a presenter in the morning, and recorded to be played later in the day. The presenters must listen to the news, choose what they decide should be played and write out the reports themselves.
