= WKGT-LP =

- North Adams, Massachusetts; United States
- Broadcast area: Pittsfield, Massachusetts
- Frequency: 104.7 MHz

Programming
- Format: Gospel

Ownership
- Owner: Gospel Train Ministry

History
- First air date: 2004
- Former frequencies: 107.1 FM (2003–2013); 104.3 (2013–2015)

Technical information
- Licensing authority: FCC
- Facility ID: 133361
- Class: L1
- ERP: 100 watts
- HAAT: −155 meters (−509 ft)
- Transmitter coordinates: 42°41′53.00″N 73°7′47.00″W

Links
- Public license information: LMS

WKGT-LP (104.7 FM) is a radio station licensed to North Adams, Massachusetts, United States, the station serves the Pittsfield area. The station is owned by Gospel Train Ministry.
