= KAPU-LP =

- Watsonville, California; United States
- Frequency: 104.7 MHz

Programming
- Format: Hawaiian music

Ownership
- Owner: Ohana De Watsonville

History
- First air date: September 2004

Technical information
- Licensing authority: FCC
- Facility ID: 124331
- Class: L1
- ERP: 100 watts
- HAAT: −67 meters (−220 ft)
- Transmitter coordinates: 36°54′15.7″N 121°45′34.5″W

Links
- Public license information: LMS
- Website: kapu.org

KAPU-LP (104.7 FM) is a radio station broadcasting a Hawaiian music format. Licensed to Watsonville, California, United States, the station is currently owned by Ohana De Watsonville. Starting its broadcast in September 2004, KAPU-LP claims to be the only radio station on the U.S. mainland broadcasting a Hawaiian music format 24 hours a day.
