= KXRN-LP =

- Laguna Beach, California]; United States
- Broadcast area: Laguna Beach
- Frequency: 104.7 MHz
- Branding: KX FM

Programming
- Format: Generational rock; Community radio

Ownership
- Owner: Laguna Radio, Inc.

History
- First air date: October 1, 2012
- Former frequencies: 93.5 MHz (2009–2020)

Technical information
- Licensing authority: FCC
- Facility ID: 124565
- Class: L1
- ERP: 100 watts
- HAAT: −35.0 meters (−114.8 ft)
- Transmitter coordinates: 33°31′42″N 117°46′12″W

Links
- Public license information: LMS
- Webcast: Listen live
- Website: Official website

KXRN-LP (104.7 FM, "KXFM") is a low-power FM (LPFM) non-commercial radio station airing generational rock and community programming to Laguna Beach, California. The station serves a 5-square-mile area. It is a 501(c)(3) non-profit corporation, founded in 2012 by Tyler Russell. As of 2014, the station operated on an annual budget of approximately $300,000.

KXRN-LP changed its community of license from Laguna Niguel to Laguna Beach, and its frequency from 93.5 to 104.7 on February 3, 2020, so that they could increase their height and have less interference from KDEY-FM and KDAY both on 93.5 with KDEY-FM being to the North and KDAY-FM being to the Northwest. They have also started broadcasting in HD Radio. The station was licensed for its new facilities on April 3, 2020.
