= John Francis Leader =

Psychologist and cognitive scientist

Dr John Francis Leader, also known as JFL, is an Irish psychologist and cognitive scientist who integrates clinical, research and policy work in the areas of mental health and digitalisation.

JFL researches at University College Dublin, specialising in the intersection of psychology, technology and experiential learning, and is the host of #bodymindself.

Combining multimedia techniques with current psychological research, Leader's work on mixed reality therapy aims to make therapy more fun, immersive and effective—a type of theme park meets therapy experience.

JFL contributes to discussions about wellbeing and personal leadership in the media, and delivers keynote speeches and conducts organisational training programmes around these topics.
