= One Corporate Centre (Manila) =

General information
- Status: Completed
- Type: Office
- Location: Meralco Avenue corner Julia Vargas Avenue, Ortigas Center, Pasig, Philippines
- Coordinates: 14°35′1.54″N 121°3′48.13″E
- Construction started: 2005
- Opening: 2009
- Owner: Amberland Corporation

Height
- Antenna spire: 201.5 m (661.09 ft)
- Roof: 185 m (606.96 ft)

Technical details
- Floor count: 45 aboveground, 9 belowground
- Floor area: 117,000 m^{2} (1,259,377.52 sq ft)
- Lifts/elevators: 17

Design and construction
- Architect: Philip H. Recto Architects
- Developer: Amberland Corporation

One Corporate Centre is an office skyscraper in Pasig, Metro Manila, Philippines. It is the 13th-tallest building in the country and Metro Manila as well with a height of 202 metres (662.73 feet) from ground to tip of architectural antenna. The building has 45 floors above ground including 7 floors for commercial purposes, and 9 basement levels for parking.

One Corporate Centre was designed by Philip H. Recto Architects, and is developed and owned by Amberland Corporation.

== Location ==
The building is located at the corner of Meralco Avenue and Julia Vargas Avenue in the Ortigas Center of Pasig.

== Tenants ==
- Alternatives Food Corp.
- BDO Pasig-Meralco Ave. Branch
- Corporate International Travel & Tours, Inc.
- CPI Outsourcing
- EastWest Bank-Julia Vargas Ave. Branch
- Energy Development Corp.
- FEBC Philippines
- Global Daily Mirror
- I3 Technologies Corp.
- IHI Philippines, Inc.
- Intertek Testing Services Philippines Inc
- KDCI Outsourcing
- Lhoopa Inc.
- MiraMeds Philippines Group, LLC
- NuWorks Interactive Labs
- One Cafe and Events Place
- One Tagaytay Place Vacation Club, Inc.
- Pilipinas Trade Gas, Inc.
- TeamStaff Inc.
- The OML Center
- The Wellex Group, Inc.
- Tsukiden Global Solutions, Inc.

== Features and amenities ==
The building has a gross leasable office space of 62,670 m^{2} (674,574.27 sq ft).

Amenities inside the building include a foodcourt, executive dining/restaurants, function rooms with audio-visual facilities, a gallery overlooking the lobby for art and other exhibits, coffee shops, and a fitness center.

There are also 9 basement levels for parking with paging system, and a helipad at the roofdeck.

14 high-speed elevators and 2 service elevators service the entire building to the office floors and to the parking basements, respectively. There is also 1 service elevator servicing all floors for other purposes.

It also hosts the radio transmitter of the FM radio station 98.7 DZFE, owned by Far East Broadcasting Company.

== See also ==
- List of tallest buildings in the Philippines
