= WHUP-LP =

WHUP FM 104.7
- Hillsborough, North Carolina; United States
- Frequency: 104.7 MHz

Programming
- Language: English
- Format: Community radio

Ownership
- Owner: Hillsborough Community Media

History
- First air date: October 11, 2015

Technical information
- Licensing authority: FCC
- Facility ID: 193165
- Class: L1
- ERP: 24 watts
- HAAT: 53.5 meters
- Transmitter coordinates: 36°6′4″N 79°7′30″W

Links
- Public license information: FM 104.7 Public file; LMS
- Website: whupfm.org

WHUP FM/104.7 is an American radio station owned by 501c3 non-profit Hillsborough Community Media. It is licensed to serve Hillsborough, North Carolina. The station airs a community radio format. The callsign WHUP-LP was issued by the Federal Communications Commission on April 17, 2014, and began broadcasting in October 2015.

They offer 24/7 online streaming via the Tune-In app as well as through their website www.whupfm.org. Shows are archived on their servers and are available to listen to after air. The WHUP station is located at 117 West King Street in Hillsborough, North Carolina.
