= Far East Broadcasting Company =

International Christian radio network

- Type: non-profit
- Industry: Broadcast
- Founded: December 20, 1945
- Founder: John C. Broger; Robert H. Bowman; William J. Roberts
- Headquarters: La Mirada, California, United States
- Revenue: 9,464,451 United States dollar (2017)
- Total assets: 18,729,557 United States dollar (2022)
- Website: FEBC International; FEBC USA; FEBA UK; FEBC Australia; FEBC New Zealand; FEBC Canada; FEBC Hong Kong; FEBC Taiwan; FEBC Cambodia; FEBC YASKI Indonesia; FEBC Heartline FM; FEBC Korea; FEBC Japan; FEBC Russia; FEBA South Africa; FEBC Radio Teos; FEBC Thailand; FEBC Philippines

Far East Broadcasting Company (FEBC) is an international Christian radio network.

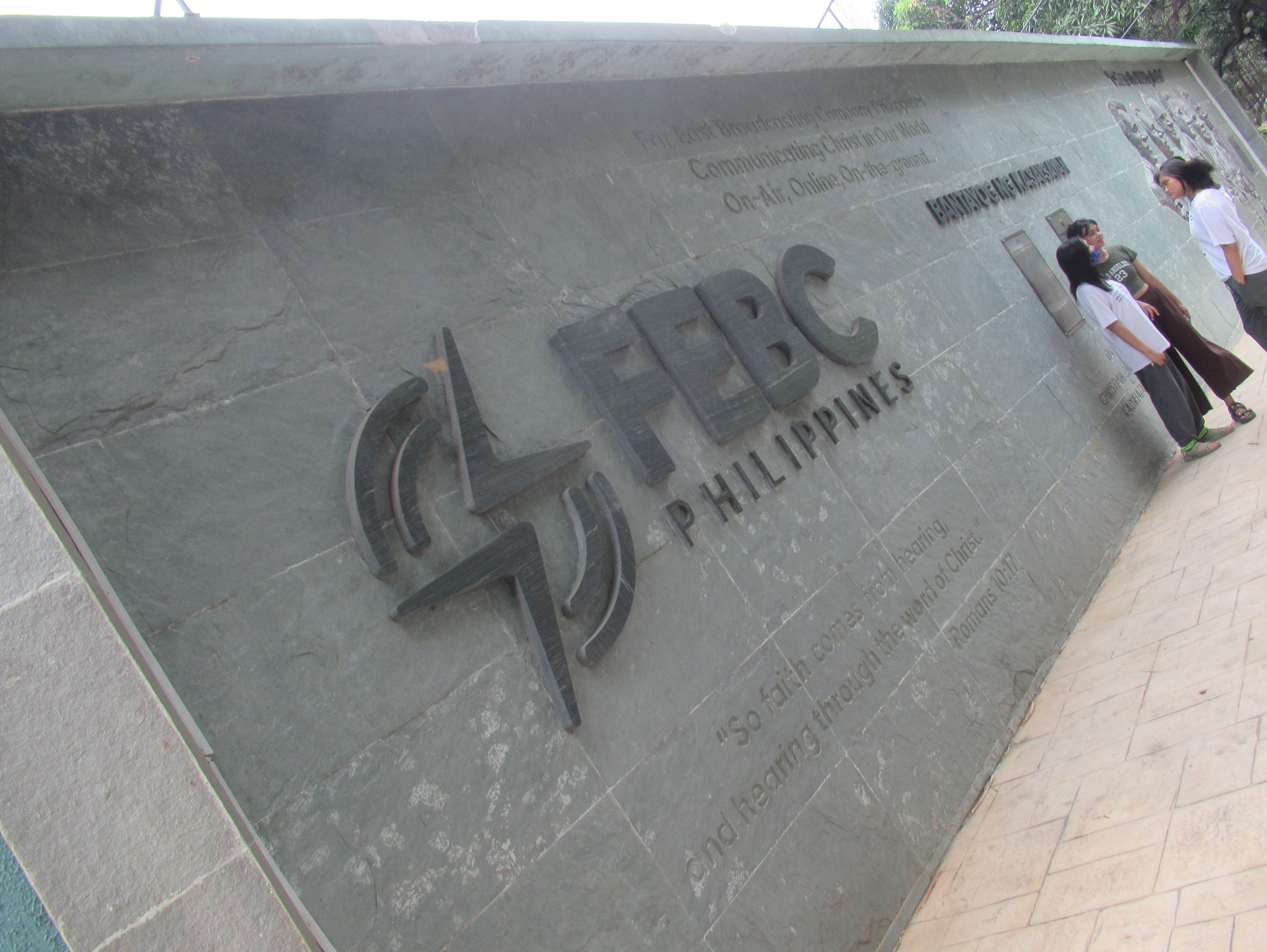
Karuhatan Pioneer's Wall (Bantayog ng Kasaysayan)

== History ==
FEBC was established on December 20, 1945, months after the end of World War II, using an initial budget of US$1,000 to establish a nonprofit Christian shortwave radio organization. In April 1946, negotiations to start a radio station in Shanghai (before the Communist regime took over three years later) started, but the Nationalists opposed the plan, under the grounds that FEBC was a foreign operation. Once the negotiations in Shanghai failed, at the end of 1946, Robert Bowman, founder of FEBC, moved to Manila at the end of the year for the same purpose: setting up the first FEBC station. The licenses were granted for medium and shortwave stations on September 4, 1946, with construction work starting in October and payments ending on November 30. The first test broadcasts were held in Manila on February 23, 1948, becoming regular a few months later, on June 4 at 6pm. The station used the KZAS callsign.

The company purchased KGEI in 1960, a station founded by GE in 1939. The station went off air in 1994 and had its equipment donated to another Christian missionary group for use in Liberia.

== Philippines ==
Far East Broadcasting Company, Philippines (FEBC Philippines)
- Industry: Broadcast
- Founded: July 27, 1948
- Headquarters: Pasig, Philippines
- Key people: Luis Miguel Castillo (President)
- Revenue: 9,464,451 United States dollar (2017)
- Total assets: 18,729,557 United States dollar (2022)
- Website: www.febc.org

The Philippines is where FEBC began its operations. In 1948, FEBC transferred to Karuhatan Road, Karuhatan from Shanghai. In 2011, it transferred to 46/F One Corporate Centre.

The 2022 FEBC Pioneers' Wall (Bantayog ng Kasaysayan) was unveiled at the former Christian Radio City Manila (CRCM) or FEBC compound in Valenzuela. The First Filipino leaders included Rev. Proceso Marcelo, Rev. Ferico Magbanua and Rev. Maximo Atienza.

=== AM/FM stations ===
Branding	Callsign	Frequency	Location
DZAS	DZAS	702 kHz	Metro Manila
DZFE	DZFE	98.7 MHz	Metro Manila
Missions Radio	DZMR	1143 kHz	Santiago
Radyo Kapitbisig	DZRK	106.3 MHz	Quezon, Palawan
Care 104.3	DWAY	104.3 MHz	Legazpi
DYVS	DYVS	1233 kHz	Bacolod
UP 987	DYFR	98.7 MHz	Cebu City
DYFE	DYFE	97.5 MHz	Tacloban
DXAS	DXAS	1116 kHz	Zamboanga City
The New J	DXJL	103.3 MHz	Cagayan de Oro
DXFE	DXFE	1197 kHz	Davao City
DXKI	DXKI	1062 kHz	Koronadal
Radyo Gandingan	DXGR	106.9 MHz	Cotabato City

=== Shortwave ===
FEBC operates its shortwave broadcasts on SW 15580 in different languages, transmitting from its facilities in Bocaue, Bulacan and Iba, Zambales. Shortwave transmissions will end April 1, 2027.

=== Digital media ===
From 2022 to 2024, FEBC Philippines owned Saved Radio, a Contemporary Christian-formatted music station. FEBC took over the ownership of Saved Radio from its original owner Becca Music in 2022, effectively shutting down its previous station Now XD. Saved Radio's internet streaming shut down in 2024, citing financial difficulties as an after-effect of the COVID-19 pandemic in the Philippines. The brand was eventually transferred to Christ's Heritage Church in October 2024, and was converted into a Baptist-oriented podcast and digital media platform.

== South Korea ==
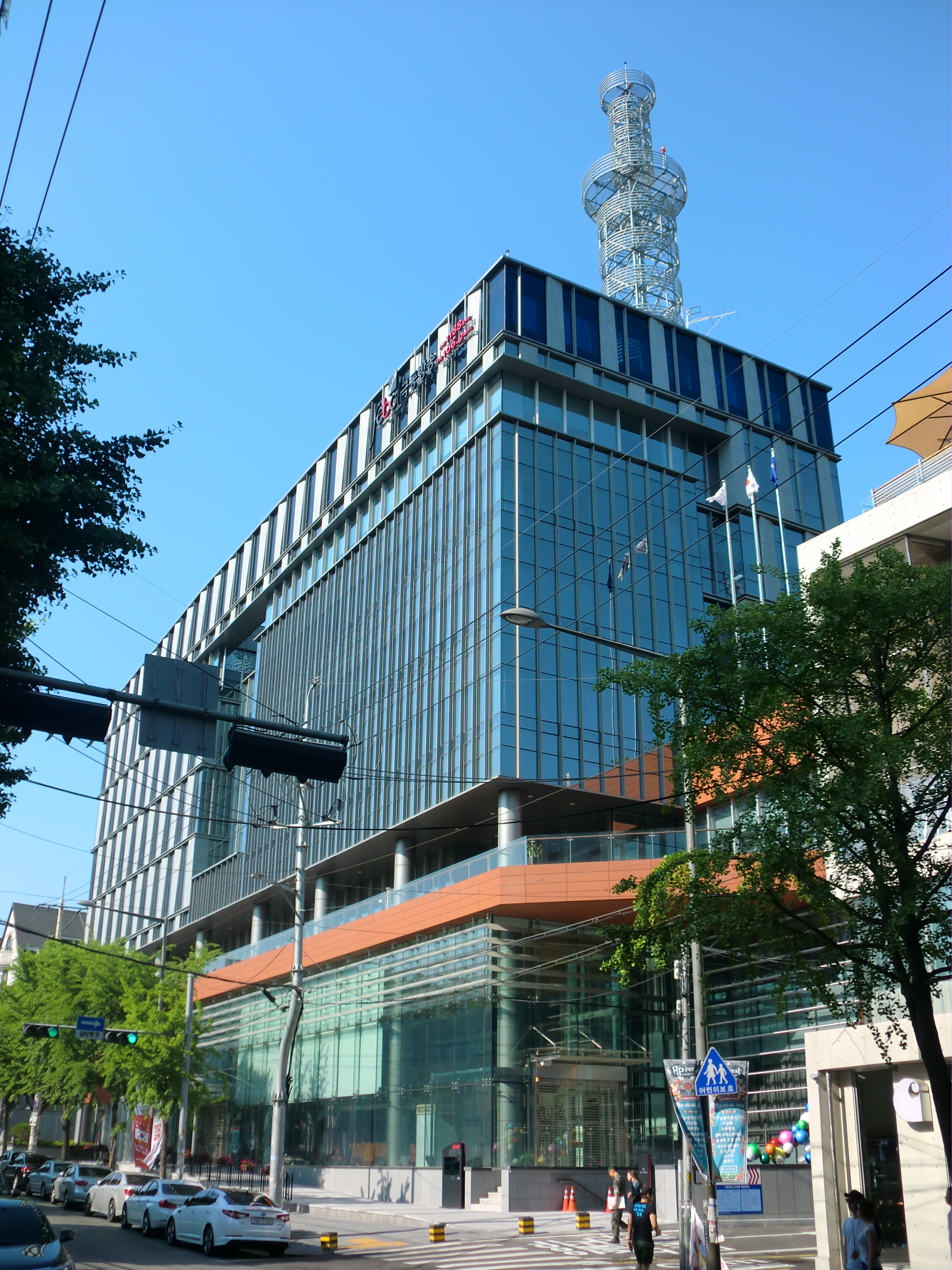
FEBC Mapo District

FEBC owns a number of stations in South Korea; the main station being HLKX in Seoul. Its station in Yeongdong (HLDY) was damaged by wildfires in April 2019. The station alone is used to disseminate religious programming to North Korea, where religious broadcasting is strictly forbidden. Only sheet music for hymns survived the blazes.

Being a puritan Christian radio network gives the connotation that FEBC in South Korea has right-wing conservative tendencies. For example, in the Special Current Affairs Symposium broadcast on September 10, 2001, professor Kim Dong-gil and others took part and aired content critical of Kim Dae-jung's government of the time. Also, former president Chun Doo-hwan, who led a dictatorship in the 1980s, celebrated the fiftieth anniversary of its founding in Korea, at a speech given on May 20, 2006. This also coincided with the anniversary of events on May 18, 1980; even after the event was held, posts appeared on FEBC Korea who demanded the removal of sponsorship contracts with the network.

Branding	Callsign	Frequency	Location
Seoul FEBC	HLKX	1188 kHz	Seoul
Seoul FEBC	—N/a	106.9 MHz	Seoul
Gangwon FEBC	HLDY	90.1 MHz	Gangwon
Gangwon FEBC	—N/a	102.9 MHz	Gangwon
Gangwon FEBC	—N/a	100.9 MHz	Gangwon
Gangwon FEBC	—N/a	104.3 MHz	Gangwon
Daejeon FEBC	HLAD	93.3 MHz	Daejeon
Jeonbuk FEBC	HLEN	91.1 MHz	Jeonbuk
Gwangju FEBC	HLED	93.1 MHz	Gwangju
Mokpo FEBC	HLKW	100.5 MHz	Mokpo
Jeonmandongbu FEBC	HLEI	97.5 MHz	Jeonnam
Jeonmandongbu FEBC	—N/a	92.9 MHz	Jeonnam
Taegu FEBC	HLKK	91.9 MHz	Daegu
Taegu FEBC	—N/a	105.9 MHz	Daegu
Pohang FEBC	HLDZ	90.3 MHz	Pohang
Busan FEBC	HLQQ	93.3 MHz	Busan
Busan FEBC	—N/a	96.7 MHz	Busan
Ulsan FEBC	HLQR	107.3 MHz	Ulsan
Changwon FEBC	HLDD	98.1 MHz	Changwon
Changwon FEBC	—N/a	92.5 MHz	Changwon
Jeju FEBC	HLAZ	1566 kHz	Jeju
Jeju FEBC	—N/a	104.7 MHz	Jeju
Jeju FEBC	—N/a	101.1 MHz	Jeju

== Indonesia ==
YASKI is the name for FEBC in Indonesia. It runs a number of stations under the Heartline FM brand.

Branding	Callsign	Frequency	Location
Heartline FM Tangerang	PM3FSD	100.6 MHz	Karawaci
Heartline FM Samarinda	—N/a	94.4 MHz	Samarinda
Heartline FM Lampung	PM8FFY	91.7 MHz	Lampung
Heartline FM Bali	—N/a	92.2 MHz	Bali

== Russia ==
FEBC Russia runs a number of stations under the Radio Teos brand.

Branding	Frequency	Location
Radio Teos St. Petersburg	1089 kHz	Saint Petersburg
Radio Teos Moscow	1134 kHz	Moscow

== United Kingdom ==
FEBA Radio was established in 1959 in the United Kingdom.

== United States ==
=== Mainland ===
From 1960 to 1994, FEBC owned and operated shortwave radio station KGEI in San Francisco, California.

=== Northern Mariana Islands ===
The FEBC international broadcast station on Saipan in the Commonwealth of the Northern Mariana Islands was established about 1981 and closed in 2011. The local radio station, KSAI 936 AM, was on air for 24 years until shutting down on April 30, 2002. KSAI was initially established in Saipan by the United States Office of War Information (OWI) in June 1945.

== Japan ==
There was an FEBC station in Okinawa starting in 1958. After the reversion agreement, the station became a commercial operation (Kyokuto Hoso Radio) as religious broadcasters were forbidden under the Law on Special Measures for the Reversion of Okinawa. Per a decision taken by the Diet of Japan in 1983, the station shut down in 1984.
