= DWSS-FM =

Radio station in Naga, Camarines Sur, Philippines

Bossing FM (DWSS)
Naga; Philippines
- Broadcast area: Camarines Sur and surrounding areas
- Frequency: 104.7 MHz
- Branding: 104.7 Bossing FM

Programming
- Languages: Bicolano, Filipino
- Format: Contemporary MOR, News, Talk

Ownership
- Owner: Caceres Broadcasting Corporation

History
- First air date: 1995 (as Power 104); September 18, 2016 (as DCG FM); December 15, 2020 (as Bossing FM)
- Former call signs: DWQN (1995–2011)

Technical information
- Licensing authority: NTC
- Power: 10,000 watts

DWSS (104.7 FM), broadcasting as 104.7 Bossing FM, is a radio station owned and operated by Caceres Broadcasting Corporation. Its studio and transmitter are located 2nd Floor Jacob Extension Liboton, Naga, Camarines Sur.

It was formerly known as Power 104 from 1995 to 2011, when it went off the air. In early 2016, DCG Radio-TV Network took over the station's operations and transferred its studios to J.A. Abucar Bldg. along Maharlika Highway. On September 16 that year, it was launched as DCG FM with a classic hits format. It went off the air sometime in 2017 due to transmitter problems.
