= DXAS-FM =

Radio station in Tawi-Tawi, Philippines

Radyo Pilipinas Tawi-Tawi (DXAS)
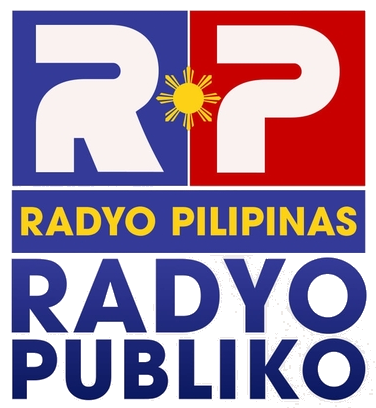
- Bongao; Philippines
- Broadcast area: Tawi-Tawi
- Frequency: 104.7 MHz
- Branding: Radyo Pilipinas

Programming
- Languages: Southern Sama, Filipino
- Format: News, Public Affairs, Talk, Government Radio
- Network: Radyo Pilipinas

Ownership
- Owner: Presidential Broadcast Service
- Sister stations: Radyo Pilipinas Sulu

History
- First air date: 2016 (on FM)
- Former call signs: DXPT; DXDC
- Former frequencies: 999 kHz

Technical information
- Licensing authority: NTC
- Power: 1,000 watts

DXAS (104.7 FM) Radyo Pilipinas is a radio station owned and operated by Presidential Broadcast Service. The station's studio is located in Brgy. Bongao Poblacion, Bongao.
