= CJFL-FM =

Former radio station in Iroquois Falls, Ontario, Canada

- Iroquois Falls, Ontario; Canada
- Frequency: 104.7 MHz
- Branding: CIY368

Programming
- Format: Community radio

Ownership
- Owner: Joel Lagacé

History
- First air date: 2005
- Last air date: July 21, 2014
- Former frequencies: 105.5 MHz (2005–2007)

Technical information
- Transmitter coordinates: 48°45′59″N 80°40′59″W

CJFL-FM, also known as "CIY368", was a Canadian LPFM radio station, which broadcast at 104.7 FM in Iroquois Falls, Ontario.

== History ==
The station went on the air in 2005 at 105.5 FM and broadcast a community radio variety format, including oldies, country, easy listening, top 40, dance and rock music.

In 2007, CJFL-FM moved to 104.7 FM.

CIY368 was a call sign of one of the many CRTC exempt undertakings that was operated by Joel Lagace prior to the latest long term CRTC approved undertaking, In Iroquois Falls.

On March 10, 2010, an application by Joel Lagacé, on behalf of a corporation to be incorporated, for a broadcasting licence to operate an English-language Type B community FM radio programming undertaking in Iroquois Falls. The applicant proposes a mixed music/pop, rock and dance music format. The application received approval by the CRTC on July 21, 2010. The station was later known as Cruise FM.

=== Closure ===
On July 18, 2014, Lagacé announced the closure of the station, airing the following message as well as a loop with the songs "Over My Shoulder" by Mike and the Mechanics, "Pompeii" by Bastille, and "A New Day" by Celine Dion.

CJFL-FM Iroquois Falls ends its Run With Pride

Attention all, As of July 21, this will be the last weekend that none [sic] profit community station CJFL-FM will be on air. Because of the decline in the Iroquois Falls market we just don't have enough to keep the station on air. I thank all of our great supporters in getting the application and helping us out throughout these great years of success. I Joel Lagace am honored that this community and the CRTC believed in me for this undertaking. It was very good experience, I enjoyed working with the community with something I know and like. But now I must also take this time to move on in my life and take these lessons learned and keep growing in the field of broadcasting.
