= WITG-LP =

- Ocala, Florida; United States
- Broadcast area: Ocala, Florida
- Frequency: 104.7 MHz (HD Radio)
- Branding: Classic Hits 104.7

Programming
- Format: Classic hits
- Subchannels: HD2: Classic country "Classic Country 104.7 HD2"

Ownership
- Owner: WITG Radio Station Inc.; (WITG Radio Station Inc.)

History
- First air date: November 2003

Technical information
- Licensing authority: FCC
- Facility ID: 131370
- Class: L1
- ERP: 74 watts
- HAAT: 34.9 meters (115 ft)
- Transmitter coordinates: 29°11′16.00″N 82°8′14.00″W

Links
- Public license information: LMS
- Webcast: Listen Live; Listen Live (HD2)
- Website: classichitsocala.com

WITG-LP (104.7 FM, "Classic Hits 104.7") is a radio station broadcasting a classic hits music format. Licensed to Ocala, Florida, United States, the station is currently owned by WITG Radio Station, Inc. It's an affiliate of the weekly syndicated Pink Floyd show "Floydian Slip."
