= KREV-LP =

- Estes Park, Colorado; United States
- Frequency: 104.7 MHz

Programming
- Format: Community radio

Ownership
- Owner: United Methodist Church of Estes Park

History
- First air date: 2003

Technical information
- Licensing authority: FCC
- Facility ID: 131930
- Class: L1
- ERP: 100 watts
- HAAT: −332.0 meters (−1,089.2 ft)
- Transmitter coordinates: 40°22′24.48″N 105°30′33.04″W

Links
- Public license information: LMS
- Webcast: Listen Live
- Website: www.krevlp.org

KREV-LP (104.7 FM) is a radio station broadcasting a community radio format. Licensed to Estes Park, Colorado, United States, the station is owned by United Methodist Church of Estes Park. KREV-LP features programs for the 40+ audience: easy listening, light rock, 1950s music, classical, jazz/big band, and old-time radio shows. Religious programming is carried on Sunday mornings. Local information about Estes Park and Rocky Mountain National Park is provided throughout the day and in a morning community bulletin board segment. Beginning the first Sunday in Advent, the station plays all holiday music until January 2.
