= List of radio stations in Nevada =

The following is a list of FCC-licensed radio stations in the U.S. state of Nevada, which can be sorted by their call signs, frequencies, cities of license, licensees, and programming formats.

== List of radio stations ==
Call sign	Frequency	City of license	Licensee	Format
KACE	98.3 FM	Beatty	Smith and Fitzgerald, Partnership	Country
KACG	100.3 FM	Goldfield	Smith and Fitzgerald, Partnership	Country
KACP	103.1 FM	Pahrump	Shamrock Communications, Inc.	Country
KADD	93.5 FM	Logandale	Radio Activo 2 LLC	Regional Mexican
KAER	89.3 FM	Mesquite	Educational Media Foundation	Worship music (Air1)
KAVB	98.7 FM	Hawthorne	NYX Communications, Inc.	Classic hits
KAVS-LP	93.9 FM	Fallon	Oasis Christian Radio	Christian
KBET	790 AM	Winchester	Silver State Broadcasting LLC – Debtor in Possession	Urban contemporary
KBGZ	103.9 FM	Spring Creek	Global One Media, Inc	Country
KBOK-LP	93.3 FM	Reno	Sonrise Church d/b/a Calvary Chapel of Northwest Reno	Religious Teaching
KBSJ	91.3 FM	Jackpot	Idaho State Board of Education	Public News/Talk
KBUL-FM	98.1 FM	Carson City	Radio License Holding CBC, LLC	Country
KBZZ	1230 AM	Reno	Americom Limited Partnership	Alternative rock
KCEP	88.1 FM	Las Vegas	Economic Opportunity Board of Clark County	Urban contemporary
KCMY	1300 AM	Carson City	The Evans Broadcasting Company, Inc.	Classic country
KCNV	89.7 FM	Las Vegas	Nevada Public Radio	Classical
KCYE	102.7 FM	Boulder City	Beasley Media Group, LLC	Country
KDJJ	94.1 FM	Fernley	Northway Broadcasting, LLC	Spanish adult contemporary
KDOT	104.5 FM	Reno	Lotus Radio Corp.	Active rock
KDSS	92.7 FM	Ely	Coates Broadcasting, Inc.	Country
KDYR	90.9 FM	Dyer	Radio Goldfield Broadcasting Inc.	Classic Country
KEAU	104.7 FM	Elko	Elko Broadcasting Company	Sports (FSR)
KELC	91.9 FM	Hawthorne	Lucky Boy Educational Media, Inc.	Visitor Information
KELK	1240 AM	Elko	Elko Broadcasting Company	Adult contemporary
KELY	1230 AM	Ely	Ely Radio, LLC	News/Talk
KENO	1460 AM	Las Vegas	Lotus Broadcasting Corp.	Spanish sports
KENT	1540 AM	Enterprise	El Sembrador Ministries	Spanish religious
KFBR	91.5 FM	Gerlach	Burning Man Project	Variety
KFDG-LP	95.9 FM	Las Vegas	Iglesia Cristiana Voz de Salvacion	Spanish religious
KFOY	1060 AM	Sparks	Lotus Radio Corp.	Conservative talk
KGFN	89.1 FM	Goldfield	Radio Goldfield Broadcasting Inc.	Classic Country
KHIQ	89.9 FM	Tonopah	Lucky Boy Educational Media, Inc.	Classical
KHIT	1450 AM	Reno	Lotus Radio Corp.	Sports (ESPN)
KHIX	96.7 FM	Carlin	Global One Media, Inc	Hot adult contemporary
KHRM	90.3 FM	Round Mountain	Radio Goldfield Broadcasting Inc.	
KHSJ-LP	100.1 FM	Las Vegas	Radio Paradise, Inc.	Christian
KHWG-FM	100.1 FM	Crystal	President of the Liberty Church of Nevada and His Successors, A Corporation Sole	Classic country
KHYX	102.7 FM	Winnemucca	Nomadic Broadcasting LLC	Hot adult contemporary
KIHM	920 AM	Reno	Relevant Radio, Inc.	Religious
KISF	103.5 FM	Las Vegas	Latino Media Network, LLC	Regional Mexican
KISK	104.9 FM	Cal-Nev-Ari	Smoke and Mirrors, LLC	Hot adult contemporary
KIYQ-LP	107.1 FM	Las Vegas	Reading, Writing, Arithmetic, Inc.	Adult standards/Talk
KJJJ	102.3 FM	Laughlin	Steven M. Greeley	Country
KJLR-LP	100.5 FM	Reno	Ministerio Palabra de Vida, Inc.	Silent
KJUL	104.7 FM	Moapa Valley	Summit American, Inc.	Oldies
KKFT	99.1 FM	Gardnerville-Minden	The Evans Broadcasting Company, Inc.	News/Talk
KKGK	1340 AM	Las Vegas	Lotus Broadcasting Corp.	Sports (FSR)
KKLZ	96.3 FM	Las Vegas	Beasley Media Group, LLC	Classic hits
KKOH	780 AM	Reno	Radio License Holding CBC, LLC	News/Talk
KKTT-LP	97.9 FM	Winnemucca	Winnemucca Christian Broadcasting Association	Christian
KKTU-FM	99.5 FM	Fallon	Lahontan Valley Broadcasting Company, LLC	Hot adult contemporary
KKVV	1060 AM	Las Vegas	Las Vegas Broadcasters, Inc.	Religious
KLAP	89.5 FM	Gerlach	Openskyradio Corp.	Country
KLAV	1230 AM	Las Vegas	Lotus Broadcasting Corp.	Sports
KLKO	93.7 FM	Elko	Elko Broadcasting Company	Adult hits
KLKR	89.3 FM	Elko	Nevada Public Radio	Public radio
KLNR	91.7 FM	Panaca	Nevada Public Radio	Public News/Talk
KLRH	92.9 FM	Reno	Educational Media Foundation	Contemporary Christian (K-Love)
KLUC-FM	98.5 FM	Las Vegas	Audacy License, LLC	Top 40 (CHR)
KLYX	89.7 FM	Pioche	Lincoln County School District	Variety
KMRG-LP	106.9 FM	Pahrump	MRBroadcasting	Variety
KMXB	94.1 FM	Henderson	Audacy License, LLC	Hot adult contemporary
KMZQ	670 AM	Las Vegas	Kemp Communications, Inc.	Conservative talk
KNCC	91.5 FM	Elko	Board of Regents of the Nevada System of Higher Education	Public Radio
KNCJ	89.5 FM	Reno	Board of Regents of the Nevada System of Higher Education	Classical/Jazz
KNEV	95.5 FM	Reno	Radio License Holding CBC, LLC	Classic hip hop
KNEZ	107.3 FM	Hazen	Lazer Licenses, LLC	Spanish oldies
KNIH	970 AM	Paradise	Relevant Radio, Inc.	Religious
KNIS	91.3 FM	Carson City	Western Inspirational Broadcasters, Inc.	Contemporary Christian
KNNR	1400 AM	Sparks	Silver State Broadcasting LLC	Spanish adult contemporary
KNPR	88.9 FM	Las Vegas	Nevada Public Radio	Public News/Talk
KNVC-LP	95.1 FM	Carson City	The End of the Trail Broadcast Project	Variety
KNVQ	90.7 FM	Spring Creek	Western Inspirational Broadcasters, Inc.	Contemporary Christian
KNVR	102.5 FM	Fallon	Northway Broadcasting, LLC	News/Talk
KNYE	95.1 FM	Pahrump	Pahrump Radio, Inc.	Oldies
KOLC	97.3 FM	Carson City	Americom Las Vegas Limited Partnership	Country
KOMP	92.3 FM	Las Vegas	Lotus Broadcasting Corp.	Active rock
KOZZ-FM	105.7 FM	Reno	Lotus Radio Corp.	Classic rock
KPFF-LP	97.7 FM	Pahrump	Pahrump Film Festival Inc	Oldies/Talk
KPFV-LP	98.1 FM	Pahrump	Radio Education Network Inc	Variety
KPGF	93.7 FM	Sun Valley	Flinn Broadcasting Corporation	Western talk and music
KPKK	101.1 FM	Amargosa Valley	Sky Media, L.L.C.	Spanish adult contemporary
KPLY	630 AM	Reno	Lotus Radio Corp.	Sports (FSR)
KQLL	1280 AM	Henderson	S & R Broadcasting, Inc.	Oldies
KQMB	90.3 FM	Beatty	Lucky Boy Educational Media, Inc.	Hot-adult contemporary
KQMC	90.1 FM	Hawthorne	Lucky Boy Educational Media, Inc.	Classic hits
KQNV	89.9 FM	Fallon	Lucky Boy Educational Media, Inc.	Contemporary Christian
KQRT	105.1 FM	Las Vegas	Entravision Holdings, LLC	Regional Mexican
KRAT	92.1 FM	Sparks	The Evans Broadcast Company, Inc.	Alternative rock
KRBV-LP	95.1 FM	Bunkerville	Bunkerville Volunteer Fire Department	Variety
KRFN	100.9 FM	Sparks	The Evans Broadcast Company, Inc.	Adult contemporary
KRGT	99.3 FM	Sunrise Manor	Latino Media Network, LLC	Spanish urban
KRJC	95.3 FM	Elko	Elko Broadcasting Company, Inc.	Country
KRLV	920 AM	Las Vegas	Lotus Broadcasting Corp.	Sports
KRNG	101.3 FM	Fallon	Juan C. Rodriguez	Contemporary Christian
KRNO	106.9 FM	Incline Village	Americom Las Vegas Limited Partnership	Adult contemporary
KRNV-FM	102.1 FM	Reno	Entravision Holdings, LLC	Regional Mexican
KRRN	92.7 FM	Moapa Valley	Entravision Holdings, LLC	Bilingual rhythmic CHR
KRXX	103.3 FM	Tonopah	RxDIO.com, LLC	Visitor Information
KRZQ	105.9 FM	Amargosa Valley	Shamrock Communications, Inc.	Country
KSHP	1400 AM	North Las Vegas	Las Vegas Broadcasting LLC	Sports/Shopping
KSNE-FM	106.5 FM	Las Vegas	iHM Licenses, LLC	Adult contemporary
KSOS	90.5 FM	Las Vegas	Faith Communications Corporation	Contemporary Christian
KSVL	92.3 FM	Smith	The Evans Broadcast Company, Inc.	News/talk
KTHX-FM	94.5 FM	Sun Valley	Lotus Radio Corp.	Regional Mexican
KTPH	91.7 FM	Tonopah	Nevada Public Radio	Public News/Talk
KTQQ	88.1 FM	Elko	Radio 74 Internationale	Contemporary Christian
KUEZ	104.1 FM	Fallon	Big Horn Media, Inc.	Soft adult contemporary
KUNR	88.7 FM	Reno	Board of Regents of the Nevada System of Higher Education	Public radio
KUNV	91.5 FM	Las Vegas	University of Nevada-Las Vegas	Jazz
KUOL	94.5 FM	Elko	Global One Media, Inc	Classic hits
KVEG	97.5 FM	Mesquite	Kemp Broadcasting, Inc.	Rhythmic contemporary
KVGK	93.1 FM	Las Vegas	iHM Licenses, LLC	Adult hits
KVGQ	106.9 FM	Overton	Kemp Communications, Inc.	Classic hip hop
KVID	88.5 FM	Mesquite	Ondas de Vida, Inc.	Contemporary Christian (K-Love)
KVKL	91.1 FM	Las Vegas	Educational Media Foundation	Contemporary Christian (K-Love)
KVLV	980 AM	Fallon	Lahontan Valley Broadcasting Company, LLC	Country
KVNV	89.1 FM	Sun Valley	Nevada Public Radio	Public News/Talk
KVPH	104.3 FM	North Las Vegas	VCY America, Inc.	Christian
KVUW	102.3 FM	Wendover	Alexander Ortega	Classic rock
KVXL-LP	101.1 FM	Las Vegas	Liberty Baptist Church of Las Vegas	Religious Teaching
KWID	101.9 FM	Las Vegas	Lotus Broadcasting Corp.	Spanish adult hits
KWNA-FM	92.7 FM	Winnemucca	Elko Broadcasting Company, Inc.	Country
KWNK-LP	97.7 FM	Reno	Reno Bike Project	Variety
KWNR	95.5 FM	Henderson	iHM Licenses, LLC	Country
KWNZ	106.3 FM	Lovelock	Lazer Licenses, LLC	Spanish CHR
KWPR	88.7 FM	Lund	Nevada Public Radio	Public News/Talk
KWWN	1100 AM	Las Vegas	Lotus Broadcasting Corp.	Sports (ESPN)
KXLI	94.5 FM	Moapa	Radio Activo Broadcasting License, LLC	Spanish adult contemporary
KXNT	840 AM	North Las Vegas	Audacy License, LLC	News/Talk
KXPT	97.1 FM	Las Vegas	Lotus Broadcasting Corp.	Classic rock
KXQQ-FM	100.5 FM	Henderson	Audacy License, LLC	Rhythmic Hot AC
KXTE	107.5 FM	Pahrump	Beasley Media Group Licenses, LLC	Alternative rock
KXTO	1550 AM	Reno	First Broadcasting of Nevada, Inc.	Latin contemporary
KXXS	90.1 FM	Goldfield	Lucky Boy Educational Media, Inc.	Visitor Information
KXZZ	100.1 FM	Dayton	Lotus Radio Corp.	Classic country
KYHW-LP	94.7 FM	Gardnerville	Calvary Chapel of Carson Valley	Religious Teaching
KYLI	96.7 FM	Bunkerville	Farmworker Educational Radio Network, Inc.	Regional Mexican
KYSA	88.3 FM	Sparks	Educational Media Foundation	Worship music (Air1)
KZTI	105.3 FM	Fallon Station	Lazer Licenses, LLC	Rhythmic AC

== Defunct ==
- KDWN
- KLME
- KLSQ
- KOJ
- KVGK-LP
- KXEQ
- KXST
- KZTQ
