= KZTQ =

KZTQ may refer to:

- KZTQ (AM), a radio station (1270 AM) formerly licensed to serve Sparks, Nevada, United States
- KBZZ (AM), a radio station (1230 AM) licensed to serve Reno, Nevada, which held the call sign KZTQ from 2019 to 2025
- KPGF, a radio station (93.7 FM) licensed to serve Sun Valley, Nevada, which held the call sign KZTQ from 2011 to 2018
- KOLC, a radio station (97.3 FM) licensed to serve Carson City, Nevada, which held the call sign KZTQ from 2004 to 2011
- KNEX (FM), a radio station (106.1 FM) licensed to serve Laredo, Texas, United States, which held the call sign KZTQ from 1991 to 1997
