= KSGG =

KSGG may refer to:

- KSGG (FM), a radio station (104.7 FM) licensed to serve Soledad, California, United States; see List of radio stations in California
- KZTQ (AM), a radio station (1270 AM) formerly licensed to serve Sparks, Nevada, United States, which held the call sign KSGG in 2018
- KBZZ (AM), a radio station (1230 AM) licensed to serve Reno, Nevada, which held the call sign KSGG from 2013 to 2018
- KOLC, a radio station (97.3 FM) licensed to serve Carson City, Nevada, which held the call sign KSGG from 2011 to 2013
