= KTHX =

KTHX may refer to:

- KTHX-FM, a radio station (94.5 FM) licensed to Sun Valley, Nevada, United States
- KXZZ (FM), a radio station (100.1 FM) licensed to Dayton, Nevada, that had used the KTHX-FM call sign from 1997 to 2021
- kthx, internet slang for "okay, thanks"
- KTHX, an alumni association at KTH, Royal Institute of Technology, Stockholm Sweden
