= KACP (FM) =

- Pahrump, Nevada; United States
- Frequency: 103.1 MHz (HD Radio)
- Branding: "Ace Country"

Programming
- Format: Country

Ownership
- Owner: Shamrock Communications, Inc.
- Sister stations: KRZQ, KPVM-LP, KACE, KACG, KDJJ, KPKK

Technical information
- Licensing authority: FCC
- Facility ID: 189474
- Class: C3
- ERP: 25,000 watts
- HAAT: −87 metres (−285 ft)
- Transmitter coordinates: 36°17′2.7″N 116°03′1.3″W

Links
- Public license information: Public file; LMS
- Website: kpvm.tv/ace-country

KACP (103.1 FM) is a radio station licensed to serve the community of Pahrump, Nevada. The station is owned by Shamrock Communications, Inc., and airs a country music format.

The station was assigned the KACP call letters by the Federal Communications Commission on July 14, 2014.
