= KRZQ =

- Amargosa Valley, Nevada; United States
- Broadcast area: Las Vegas Valley
- Frequency: 105.9 MHz
- Branding: Ace Country 105.9

Programming
- Format: Country music

Ownership
- Owner: Shamrock Communications, Inc.
- Sister stations: KACP, KACE, KACG, KDJJ, KPKK, KPVM-LP

History
- First air date: 2012
- Former call signs: KZNV (2011–2017)

Technical information
- Licensing authority: FCC
- Facility ID: 170180
- Class: C1
- ERP: 51,000 watts
- HAAT: -19 meters
- Transmitter coordinates: 36°38′32.4″N 116°23′56.4″W

Links
- Public license information: Public file; LMS
- Website: https://kaceradio.com

KRZQ (105.9 FM, "Ace Country 105.9") is a radio station in Amargosa Valley, Nevada serving the area with a country music format.
