= KLCA =

Coordinates: 39.310°N 119.885°W

- Tahoe City, California; United States
- Broadcast area: Reno, Nevada
- Frequency: 96.5 MHz (HD Radio)
- Branding: Alice 96.5

Programming
- Format: Contemporary hit radio
- Subchannels: HD2: Swag 104.9 (Rhythmic contemporary); HD3: Suave 96.9 (Spanish hot adult contemporary); HD4: Juan 101.7 (Spanish adult hits)
- Affiliations: Premiere Networks

Ownership
- Owner: Reno Media Group; (Reno Media Group)
- Sister stations: KODS, KBZZ, KOLC, KZTQ, KRNO

History
- First air date: 1985; 41 years ago

Technical information
- Licensing authority: FCC
- Facility ID: 41884
- Class: C1
- ERP: 6,100 watts
- HAAT: 903 meters (2,963 ft)
- Translator: See § Translators

Links
- Public license information: Public file; LMS
- Website: www.alice965.com; www.swag1049.com (HD2); suave969.com (HD3); juan1017.com (HD4)

KLCA (96.5 FM) is a commercial radio station licensed to Tahoe City, California, broadcasting to the Reno, Nevada, and Lake Tahoe areas. KLCA airs a contemporary hit radio format branded "Alice 96-5". The station, part of Tom Quinn's Reno Media Group, broadcasts from a transmitter atop Slide Mountain overlooking Reno, Carson City, and Lake Tahoe. Its studios are located on Matley Lane in East Reno.

KLCA is licensed by the U.S. Federal Communications Commission (FCC) to broadcast in the HD (hybrid) format.

== History ==
"Alice" was launched in early 1997 at the 100.9 frequency (replacing a country formatted station) where KRFN now broadcasts. In 1998, the two stations swapped frequencies, which gave the station a broadcast antenna atop Slide Mountain and improved coverage to include the Lake Tahoe and Carson City areas.

Alice's growth was sluggish after moving to the 96.5 frequency as longtime Howard Stern fans in the Tahoe area were angry that they could no longer hear Stern on KRZQ's 100.9 frequency (with a tower on the valley floor). But the original Alice concept of a pop/alternative format designed to flank Hot AC KNEV (Magic 95.5) and CHR KWNZ (K-Wins 97.3) built a solid following on a diet of Matchbox 20, Third Eye Blind, Sugar Ray, etc. The original position statement was "Modern Hits." Longtime KWNZ morning show host "Wild" Bill Cody was hired to host mornings. The pop/alternative audience didn't gravitate to Cody's CHR stunts, and the station moved in a different direction in 1998 while transiting to the 96.5 frequency.

The station attracted fans with a playful attitude not typically heard on Hot AC radio at the time - including giving away a divorce on Independence Day (Reno is the divorce capital), conducting a displaced Bunny Ranch "working girls" job fair, hosting an Elaine Dance contest during the final episode of Seinfeld, looking for Nevada's best looking "Wookie" before the Star Wars: Episode I – The Phantom Menace premiere and bringing street side speed dating to Reno. It also played alternative rock songs that did not fit the hot AC format such as Weezer's Troublemaker in the playlist despite being on the playlist of KRZQ-FM (now KRFN).

When the pop/alternative format began to fade nationally, KLCA moved more toward a pure pop/hits approach leading to today's positioning statement: "#1 for Today's New Music." However, Mediabase moved KLCA to the contemporary hit radio panel, adespite KWNZ & KWYL continuing the contemporary hit radio trend. The last official day for Nielsen BDS reports as a hot adult contemporary for the station was on July 19, 2011. After that, the shift to contemporary hit radio completed, overlapping slightly for a month with its sister station KWNZ, which became adult hits after this. Two months later, the hot adult contemporary format resurfaced on KMXW, replacing alternative rock station KRZQ-FM.

== Translators ==
| Call sign | Frequency (MHz) | City of license | FCC info | Rebroadcasts |
|---|---|---|---|---|
| K228DA | 93.5 | Carson City, Nevada | FCC (K228DA) | KLCA-HD2 |
| K245BV | 96.9 | Reno, Nevada | FCC (K245BV) | KLCA-HD3 |
| K245DM | 96.9 | Carson City, Nevada | FCC (K245DM) | KLCA |
| K269DB | 101.7 | Carson City, Nevada | FCC (K269DB) | KLCA |
| K269FC | 101.7 | Reno, Nevada | FCC (K269FC) | KLCA-HD4 |
| K285EQ | 104.9 | Reno, Nevada | FCC (K285EQ) | KLCA-HD2 |

== See also ==
- KALC, Alice 105.9, Denver, Colorado
- KALZ, Alice 96.7, Fowler, California
- KLLC, Alice @ 97.3, San Francisco
