= KACG =

- Goldfield, Nevada; United States
- Frequency: 100.3 MHz
- Branding: Ace Country 100.3

Programming
- Format: Country

Ownership
- Owner: Smith and Fitzgerald, Partnership
- Sister stations: KACP, KRZQ, KACE, KDJJ, KPKK, KPVM-LP

Technical information
- Licensing authority: FCC
- Facility ID: 189485
- Class: A
- ERP: 140 watts
- HAAT: −59 metres (−194 ft)
- Transmitter coordinates: 37°42′30.3″N 117°14′06.9″W

Links
- Public license information: Public file; LMS
- Website: kpvm.tv/ace-country

KACG (100.3 FM) is a radio station licensed to serve the community of Goldfield, Nevada. The station is owned by Smith and Fitzgerald, Partnership, and airs a country music format.

The station was assigned the KACG call letters by the Federal Communications Commission on August 18, 2014.
