= KURK =

KURK may refer to:

- KURK-LD, a low-power television station (channel 3, virtual 45) licensed to serve Santa Rosa/San Francisco, California, United States
- KRFN, a radio station (100.9 FM) licensed to serve Sparks, Nevada, United States, which held the call sign KURK from 2014 to 2017
- KLRH, a radio station (92.9 FM) licensed to serve Reno, Nevada, which used the call sign KURK from 2003 to 2014
- KADL, a radio station (102.9 FM) licensed to serve Imperial, Nebraska, United States, which used the call sign KURK from 2001 to 2003
