= KBZZ =

KBZZ may refer to:

- KBZZ (AM), a radio station (1230 AM) licensed to serve Reno, Nevada, United States
- KZTQ (AM), a radio station (1270 AM) formerly licensed to serve Sparks, Nevada, which held the call sign KBZZ from 2001 to 2018 and 2019 to 2025
- KCIL, a radio station (96.7 FM) licensed to serve Gray, Louisiana, United States, which held the call sign KBZZ-FM from 2000 to 2007
- KBLJ, a radio station (1400 AM) licensed to serve La Junta, Colorado, United States, which held the call sign KBZZ until 1999
