= KNCC =

KNCC may refer to:

- KNCC (FM), a radio station in Elko, Nevada, United States
- Kuwait National Cinema Company, the operator of Cinescape movie theatres
