= KACE =

KACE may refer to:

- KACE (FM), a radio station (98.3 FM) licensed to serve Beatty, Nevada
- KNFL (Utah), a defunct radio station (1470 AM) formerly licensed to serve Tremonton, Utah, which held the call sign KACE from 2001 to 2004
- KNIV, a radio station (104.7 FM) licensed to serve Lyman, Wyoming, which held the call sign KACE in 2001
- KWUT, a radio station (97.7 FM) licensed to serve Elsinore, Utah, which held the call sign KACE in 2000 and 2001
- KLXM, a radio station (103.9 FM) licensed to serve Inglewood, California, which held the call sign KACE from 1976 to 2000
- Kenya Agricultural Commodity Exchange
- Quest KACE, a provider of systems management appliances, who has merged with Quest Software
