= KDYR =

KDYR may refer to:

- KDYR (FM), a radio station (90.9 FM) licensed to serve Dyer, Nevada, United States; see List of radio stations in Nevada
- Dyersburg Regional Airport (ICAO code KDYR)
