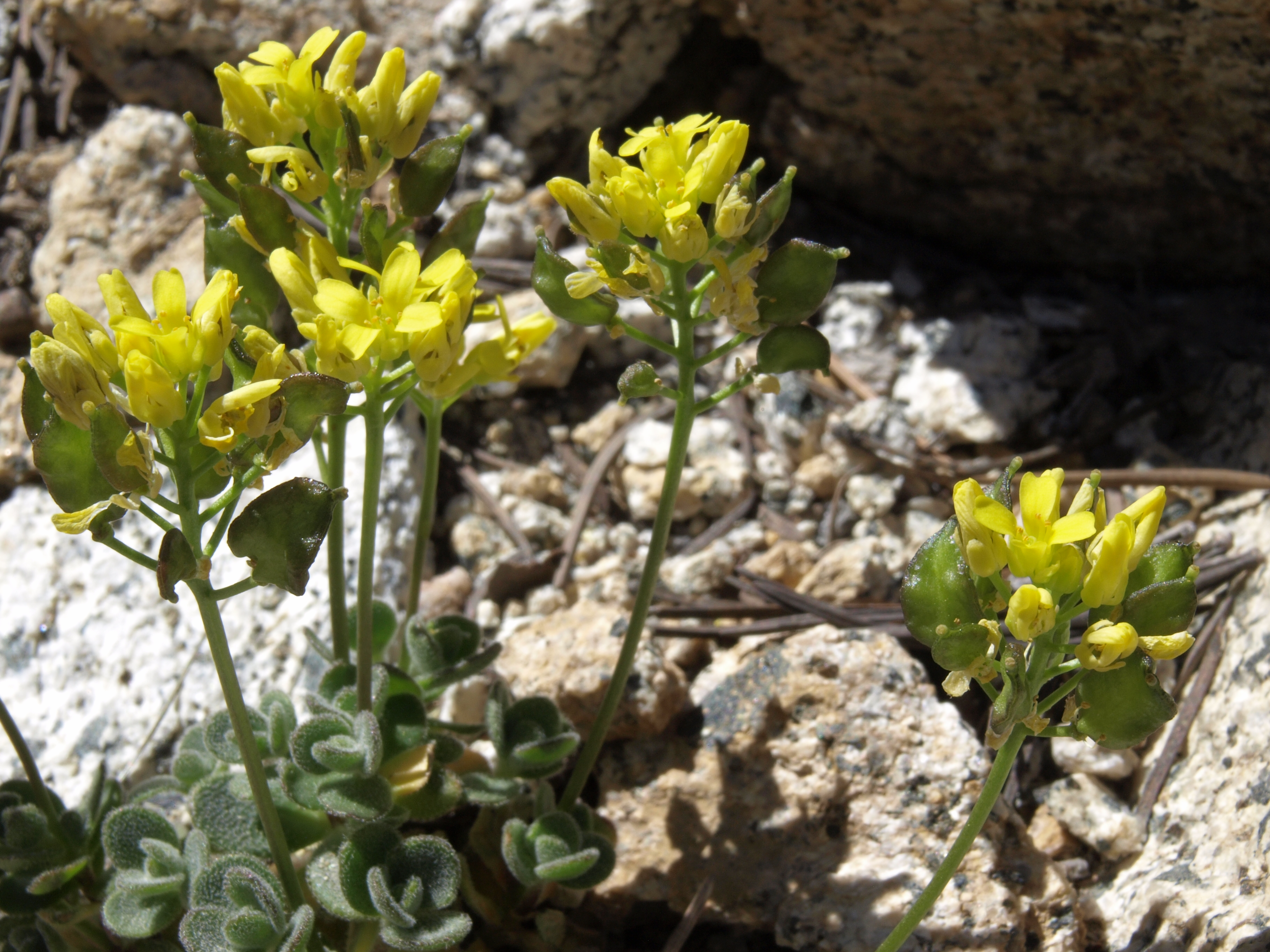

Conservation status
- Imperiled (NatureServe)

Scientific classification
- Kingdom: Plantae
- Clade: Tracheophytes
- Clade: Angiosperms
- Clade: Eudicots
- Clade: Rosids
- Order: Brassicales
- Family: Brassicaceae
- Genus: Draba
- Species: D. asterophora

Binomial name
- Draba asterophora Payson

= Draba asterophora =

Species of flowering plant

Draba asterophora is a species of flowering plant in the family Brassicaceae known by the common names Lake Tahoe draba or Tahoe whitlow-grass. This rare plant is known only from the Mount Rose and Slide Mountain areas of the northern Carson Range in extreme western Nevada, in and just outside of the Lake Tahoe drainage basin. It is a squat perennial herb which forms small mats in rocky habitat in the alpine climate of the high mountains. It forms a basal patch of thick, hairy oval leaves up to 1.5 centimeters long. A small, erect inflorescence arises from the patch bearing several yellow mustard-like flowers. The fruit is a flat, wavy silique which is oval in shape, somewhat membranous, and up to 1.5 centimeters long. It contains several flat, round seeds with wide wings along the edges.
