= Kace =

Kace may refer to:

- Ergys Kaçe (born 1993), Albanian football player
- Kace Bartley (born 1997), English squash player

== See also ==
- KACE (disambiguation), various acronyms
