= KRFN =

Adult contemporary radio station in Reno, Nevada

- Sparks, Nevada; United States
- Broadcast area: Reno–Sparks metropolitan area
- Frequency: 100.9 MHz (HD Radio)
- Branding: Fun 101

Programming
- Format: Adult contemporary
- Subchannels: HD2: "X 94.9" (Alternative rock)

Ownership
- Owner: Evans Broadcasting
- Sister stations: KKFT, KRAT

History
- First air date: July 1, 1983; 43 years ago (as KNAA)
- Former call signs: KNAA (1983–1990); KKMR (1990–1993); KNDE (1993–1995); KQNV (1995–1997); KLCA (1997–1998); KQNV (3/10/1998–3/15/1998); KRZQ-FM (1998–2011); KMXW (2011–2014); KURK (2014–2017)
- Call sign meaning: K Radio FuN

Technical information
- Licensing authority: FCC
- Facility ID: 48683
- Class: A
- ERP: 6,000 watts
- HAAT: 62 meters (203 ft)
- Transmitter coordinates: 39.3677°N 119.7863°W
- Translators: 105.1 K286AG (Carson City); HD2: 94.9 K235DC (Reno)

Links
- Public license information: Public file; LMS
- Webcast: Listen Live; Listen Live (HD2)
- Website: renosfun.com x949reno.com (HD2)

KRFN (100.9 FM) is a commercial radio station licensed to Sparks, Nevada and broadcasting to the Reno–Sparks metropolitan area. The station is owned by the Evans Broadcast Company, Inc. and it airs an adult contemporary radio format branded as "Fun 101."

KRFN has studios and offices on East Plumb Lane in Reno. Its transmitter is in the Steamboat Hills section of Reno, near Interstate 580. KRFN is a Class A FM station, which means it is limited in power to 6,000 watts. Programming is also heard on 250 watt FM translator K286AG at 105.1 in Carson City.

== History ==
On July 1, 1983, the station first signed on as KNAA. It was owned by Donald S. Beck, who served as its General Manager, Sales Manager and Program Director. The station broadcast at only 300 watts and carried an adult contemporary format. It was later sold to Johnson Broadcasting, which also owned AM 1270 KPLY (now KBZZ). The format remained adult contemporary but the call sign changed to KKMR.

In 1993, the station changed call letters to KNDE, airing a soft rock format.

In March 1998, the station was acquired by Salt Broadcasting, which already owned 100.1 KTHX-FM, an adult album alternative station also serving the Reno media market. Salt Broadcasting switched 100.9's call letters to KRZQ, and began airing an alternative rock music format, branded as "Reno's New Rock Alternative."

At 12 noon on September 12, 2011, KRZQ changed to a hot adult contemporary format. KRZQ began calling itself "Reno's Best Music Mix" and "Mix 100.9." The change in format did not result in immediate job losses, as many personalities started simply using different names. The hot adult contemporary was designed to fill the void from when KLCA dropped it for contemporary hit radio by July 2011. On September 28, 2011, KRZQ changed call letters to KMXW, to go with the "Mix 100.9" branding.

On June 20, 2014, following KURK 92.9's sale to the Educational Media Foundation, it was announced that KMXW would adopt the classic rock format heard on KURK. It would become "100.9 The Bandit" once the sale was completed. KURK 92.9 then flipped to EMF's Air 1 Contemporary Christian music network. (It has since become KLRH airing EMF's K-Love network.) On August 1, 2014, the KURK call sign moved to 100.9 FM.

In 2016, KURK rebranded as "100.9 K-Rock" and flipped to a broad mainstream rock format, playing fifty years of rock, trying to take on all of Reno's other rock stations at once. The station used a "shut up and rock" approach, limiting DJ chatter to stress its music commitment.

On February 15, 2017, KURK changed its call letters to KRFN. That was followed on March 7, 2017, with a switch from mainstream rock to adult contemporary, branded as "Fun 101".

== KRFN-HD2 ==
On August 25, 2018, KRFN launched a country music format on its HD2 subchannel, branded as "95.1 The Wolf." It was simulcast on FM translator K236CN 95.1 MHz in Reno. The country format moved from KWFP 92.1 FM Sparks, which switched to alternative rock.

In late September 2021, KRFN-HD2 changed its format from country to Top 40/CHR, branded as "94.9 The Party." It is simulcast on translator K235DC 94.9 MHz in Reno. The station currently airs the live syndicated Liveline with Mason Kelter every weeknight.

On December 26, 2023, K235DC, after having dropped its Top 40/CHR format in mid-November to stunt with Christmas music as "K-Santa", switched origin stations from KRFN-HD2 to KRAT-HD2 and launched an adult album alternative format, branded first as "Reno's Newest Radio Station" during a brief soft launch period, then as "94.9 X" upon its full launch on the 28th; the format and branding was previously used on KTHX-FM before it had dropped the format in 2021.

As of March 2025, KRFN-HD2 switched back on with a simulcast of "Radio Xtasis" and is also heard on K235DC again. In February 2026, KNNR went silent and K235DC reverted back to the "X 94.9" Alternative format.

Broadcast translator for KRFN-HD2
Call sign	Frequency	City of license	FID	ERP (W)	Class	Transmitter coordinates	FCC info
K235DC	94.9 FM	Reno, Nevada	156756	125	D	39°35′2.6″N 119°48′9.6″W	LMS

== Previous logos ==
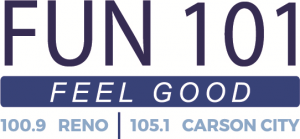
