= Washington News Service =

Washington News Service may refer to:

- Washington News Service, a private news service based in Washington, DC
- Washington News Service, a bureau of the Public News Service based in Washington state
- stories produced at the Washington, DC campus of Boston University for the BU News Service
