= KKTU =

KKTU may refer to:

- KKTU-FM, a radio station (99.5 FM) licensed to Fallon, Nevada, United States
- KDEV-LP, a defunct television station (channel 40) licensed to Cheyenne, Wyoming, United States, which used the call sign KKTU-LP from 2004 to 2008
- KQCK, a television station (channel 11/PSIP 33) licensed to Cheyenne, Wyoming, United States, which used the call sign KKTU from 1987 to 2005
- KFLQ, a radio station (91.5 FM) licensed to Albuquerque, New Mexico, United States, which used the call sign KKTU from 1980 to 1982
