= KPTL =

KPTL may refer to:

- KCMY, a radio station (1300 AM) licensed to Carson City, Nevada which held the call sign KPTL from 1955 to 2006
- KPTL-LP, a low-power radio station (96.9 FM) licensed to Temecula, California
- KXNO-FM, a radio station (106.3 FM) licensed to Ankeny, Iowa which held the call sign KPTL from 2006 to 2014
