= KDOT =

KDOT, K-Dot, or K.Dot may refer to:

- KDOT (FM)
- Kansas Department of Transportation
- K.Dot, former stage name of American rapper Kendrick Lamar
- Kayo Dot, American avant-garde metal band
