= KRGT =

KRGT may refer to:

- KRGT (FM), a radio station (99.3 FM) licensed to Indian Springs, Nevada, United States
- KRGT-LP, a defunct low-power television station (channel 6) formerly licensed to Rio Grande City, Texas, United States
