= KJZS =

KJZS may refer to:

- KJZS-LP, a low-power radio station (106.3 FM) licensed to serve Bozeman, Montana, United States
- KRAT (FM), a radio station (92.1 FM) licensed to serve Sparks, Nevada, United States, which held the call sign KJZS from 2000 to 2010
