= KOZZ-FM =

Radio station in Reno, Nevada

Coordinates: 39.313°N 119.884°W

- Reno, Nevada; United States
- Broadcast area: Reno metropolitan area
- Frequency: 105.7 MHz
- Branding: 105.7 KOZZ

Programming
- Format: Classic rock

Ownership
- Owner: Lotus Communications; (Lotus Radio Corp.)
- Sister stations: KDOT; KFOY; KHIT; KPLY; KTHX-FM; KXZZ

History
- First air date: June 20, 1970
- Former call signs: KGLR (1971–1979); KOZZ (1979–1991)

Technical information
- Licensing authority: FCC
- Facility ID: 38452
- Class: C
- ERP: 25,000 watts
- HAAT: 893 meters (2,930 ft)
- Translator: 106.5 K293AA (Battle Mountain)

Links
- Public license information: Public file; LMS
- Webcast: Listen live
- Website: kozzradio.com

KOZZ-FM (105.7 MHz) is a commercial radio station licensed to Reno, Nevada, United States. Owned by Lotus Communications, it airs a classic rock format. KOZZ's studios are on Plumb Lane in South Reno, and its transmitter is atop Slide Mountain in New Washoe City. Programming is also heard on FM translator K293AA at 106.5 MHz in Battle Mountain, Nevada.

== History ==
The station signed on the air on June 20, 1971. The original call sign was KGLR. Its transmitter was on McClellan Peak. The KGLR call letters stood for Good Life Radio. It was once an affiliate of NBC Radio's "The Source" network, which was geared to young adults.

The station started off with a freeform, progressive rock music format patterned after San Francisco's KSAN. It later adopted the newly created "Superstars" album-oriented rock (AOR) format designed by the programming consulting firm of Burkhardt, Douglass and Associates. After allowing its disc jockeys to choose their own music, the station now only played the top cuts from the biggest selling rock albums.

With its new, more accessible 'hit'-oriented programming, it featured popular personalities including Bruce Van Dyke, Daniel "The Sarge" Cook, Steve Funk, Chris "ZZ" Davis, Butch Johnson and later, Harry "The Happy Boy" Reynolds, Diane Michaels, Andy Schuon and Max Volume. The Superstars format scored early success. The first song played on the new station was "Higher and Higher" by The Moody Blues. With exciting music and promotions, plus a new high-powered transmitter, KOZZ 105.7 "Reno's Best Rock" vaulted to the number 1 rated position Arbitron in the Reno Metro market, with listeners aged 12 and over, in the Spring survey of 1978. The programming staff maintained that position until fall 1987 despite a few significant personnel changes.

As its audience began to age, the station adopted its current classic rock format in 1989. In 2023, afternoon host Chris Payne was promoted to the role of program director of both KOZZ and sister station KDOT, after the departure of Jave Patterson.
