= KACE (FM) =

- Beatty, Nevada; United States
- Frequency: 98.3 MHz
- Branding: "Ace Country"

Programming
- Format: Country

Ownership
- Owner: Smith and Fitzgerald, Partnership
- Sister stations: KACP, KRZQ, KACG, KDJJ, KPKK, KPVM-LP

Technical information
- Licensing authority: FCC
- Facility ID: 189484
- Class: C2
- ERP: 2,100 watts
- HAAT: 543.4 metres (1,783 ft)
- Transmitter coordinates: 36°56′08.3″N 116°51′02.6″W

Links
- Public license information: Public file; LMS
- Website: kpvm.tv/ace-country

KACE (98.3 FM) is a radio station licensed to serve the community of Beatty, Nevada. The station is owned by Smith and Fitzgerald, Partnership, and airs a country music format.

The station was assigned the KACE call letters by the Federal Communications Commission on November 21, 2013.
