= KODS =

Radio station in Carnelian Bay, California, serving Reno, Nevada

Coordinates: 39.310°N 119.885°W

- Carnelian Bay, California; United States
- Broadcast area: Reno, Nevada
- Frequency: 103.7 MHz
- Branding: 103.7 The River

Programming
- Format: Classic hits

Ownership
- Owner: Reno Media Group
- Sister stations: KBZZ; KLCA; KOLC; KRNO

History
- First air date: 1970 (as KNLT at 101.7)
- Former call signs: KNLT (1970–1974); KSML (1974–1977); KEZC (1977–1983); KHTX (1983–1987); KHTZ (1987–1988)
- Former frequencies: 101.7 MHz (1970–1984)

Technical information
- Licensing authority: FCC
- Facility ID: 2103
- Class: C1
- ERP: 6,300 watts
- HAAT: 910 meters (2,990 ft)
- Translator: See below

Links
- Public license information: Public file; LMS
- Webcast: Listen live
- Website: www.river1037.com

KODS (103.7 FM) is a commercial radio station licensed to Carnelian Bay, California, broadcasting to the Reno, Nevada, and Lake Tahoe areas. KODS airs a classic hits music format branded as "The River" (a local reference to the Truckee River). The station's studios are located on Matley Lane in East Reno, and its transmitter is located on Slide Mountain.

== History ==
The station, now owned by Reno Media Group, began as KNLT in 1970 with a transmitter on Brockway Summit, between Truckee, CA and Lake Tahoe. Its signal could be heard only in Truckee and in a small section of Tahoe's north shore, including Kings Beach and Carnelian Bay. Tom Quinn and a handful of investors purchased the station, then known as KEZC, in 1982. Within two years, Quinn petitioned the Federal Communications Commission to increase the station's power and he relocated the transmitter to Slide Mountain overlooking Reno, Carson City and Lake Tahoe. The station, with new call-letters KHTX and known as "K-Hits 104", had instant ratings success in the Reno radio market. This allowed Quinn to purchase a second station serving the Fresno, California area and then a third in Las Vegas, Nevada.

In September 1988, KHTZ, as the station had become known the previous year, changed format from Top 40 to oldies and its call letters to KODS. In doing so, the station regained its position as the top-rated station in Reno. In the late 1990s, KODS began using the nickname "The River" and in Incline Village the nickname "Fun 101" reflecting its use of a translator at 101.3 FM. Except during specialty programs, KODS eventually dropped most of its 1950s and early 1960s music and thus transitioned to a classic hits rather than oldies format.

KODS is now part of the nine-station Reno Media Group/Americom family of stations.

== Translators ==
KODS also broadcasts on the following FM translators:

Broadcast translator for KODS
Call sign	Frequency	City of license	FID	ERP (W)	Class	FCC info
K267AA	101.3 FM	Incline Village, Nevada	2102	46	D	LMS
K285EK	104.9 FM	Battle Mountain, Nevada	36495	19	D	LMS
