= Small Town News: KPVM Pahrump =

American documentary miniseries

- Genre: Documentary
- Country of origin: United States
- Original language: English
- No. of episodes: 6

Production
- Executive producers: Fenton Bailey; Randy Barbato; Nikki Calabrese; Nelson Walters; Nancy Abraham; Lisa Heller
- Producers: Christi Martinelli; Steven Sims
- Cinematography: Diego Lopez; Arlene Nelson
- Editors: Francy Kachler; George Mandi; Chris McKinley; Ryan Neill
- Running time: 28-29 minutes
- Production companies: HBO Documentary Films; World of Wonder

Original release
- Network: HBO
- Release: August 2 – August 16, 2021

Small Town News: KPVM Pahrump is an American documentary miniseries. It follows news station KPVM-LD in Pahrump, Nevada, and centers around news anchor Deanna O'Donnell, as they take on the challenge of expanding into the Las Vegas market. It consists of 6 episodes and premiered on August 2, 2021, on HBO.

== Plot ==
Vern Van Winkle, the owner of KPVM-LD in Pahrump, Nevada, takes on the challenge of expanding into the Las Vegas market for more exposure.

== Episodes ==
No.	Title	Original release date	U.S. viewers (millions)
1	"Our Top Story"	August 2, 2021	N/A
2	"Quitting Season"	August 2, 2021	N/A
3	"Pahrump Gets Trumped"	August 9, 2021	N/A
4	"Trunk or Treat"	August 9, 2021	N/A
5	"Electile Dysfunction"	August 16, 2021	N/A
6	"Vegas or Bust"	August 16, 2021	N/A

== Production ==
Fenton Bailey and Randy Barbato came across KPVM-LD while working on their documentary Heidi Fleiss: The Would-Be Madam of Crystal, the two decided to then pitch a television series about the station, however, they could not get a network interested in a pilot. Bailey and Barbato also found Public-access television to be a ground for new talent and ideas.

The series picked up traction at the end of 2017, with principal photography commencing in January 2020. The series doesn't have a credited director due to the fact not everyone was on set or involved with the edit, with editing taking longer than filming.

In June 2021, it was announced HBO would produce and distribute the series, with Fenton Bailey and Randy Barbato serving as executive producers under their World of Wonder banner.

== Reception ==
On Rotten Tomatoes, the series holds an approval rating of 71% based on 7 critic reviews, with an average rating of 9.00/10.
