= KAVB =

KAVB may refer to:

- KAVB (FM), a radio station (98.7 FM) licensed to serve Hawthorne, Nevada, United States
- Koninklijke Algemeene Vereniging voor Bloembollencultuur
