= KVGK-LP =

- Las Vegas, Nevada; United States
- Broadcast area: Las Vegas metropolitan area
- Frequency: 97.9 MHz
- Branding: Magic 97.9 FM

Programming
- Format: Public radio
- Affiliations: Feature Story News (FSN), T-Mobile, Las Vegas Tribune, Syndication Networks and Public News Service

Ownership
- Owner: Las Vegas Public Radio Inc.

History
- First air date: January 9, 2016
- Last air date: September 4, 2022
- Former call signs: KIOF-LP (2014–2022)
- Call sign meaning: Las Vegas Magic (unrelated to the Vegas Golden Knights)

Technical information
- Licensing authority: FCC
- Facility ID: 190166
- Class: L1
- ERP: 100 watts
- HAAT: −49 meters (−161 ft)
- Transmitter coordinates: 36°13′1.8″N 115°07′3.8″W

Links
- Public license information: LMS
- Webcast: Listen live
- Website: www.lvpr.org

KVGK-LP (97.9 FM) was a radio station licensed to serve Las Vegas, Nevada. The station, founded by Gregory LaPorta, was established in 2010, was owned by Las Vegas Public Radio Inc. and affiliated with Feature Story News (FSN), T-Mobile, the Las Vegas Tribune (a division of Tribune Media Group), Syndication Networks and Public News Service (PNS). Portsonic Communications, LLC was a local community radio investor and management company for Las Vegas Public Radio Inc. KVGK-LP was governed under the Local Community Radio Act of 2010 as a public radio station to the Las Vegas, Nevada valley.

KVGK-LP generated programming locally in Las Vegas, Nevada. The station began broadcasting on January 9, 2016, with the call sign KIOF-LP. KVGK-LP could be heard on 97.9 FM throughout the Las Vegas and North Las Vegas metropolitan areas as well as the Las Vegas Strip, T-Mobile Arena and Las Vegas Chinatown.

Las Vegas Public Radio Inc. is an independent State of Nevada Public Broadcaster, and is part of the State of Nevada Public Broadcasting System.

On September 4, 2022, Las Vegas Public Radio Inc. returned the broadcast license of the then-KIOF-LP along with the call sign back to the FCC. Las Vegas Public Radio Inc. was in the process of building its new 48,000 Watt FM radio station on KQQY (90.1 FM) as authorized through a construction permit issued by the FCC on June 9, 2022.

== History ==
This station received its original construction permit from the Federal Communications Commission on September 5, 2014. The new station was assigned the KIOF-LP call sign by the FCC on September 12, 2014. KIOF-LP began over-the-air program tests on January 9, 2016, and received its license to cover from the FCC on February 1, 2016.

In June 2018, KIOF-LP Las Vegas Public Radio Inc. officially became part of the State of Nevada Public Broadcasting System.

On June 9, 2022, the Federal Communications Commission issued a construction permit to Las Vegas Public Radio Inc. for a new station to operate on 90.1 FM and broadcast at 48,000 watts. The KIOF-LP license was deleted on September 6, 2022, in order to make way for KQQY to launch at 90.1 FM. The FCC reinstated KIOF-LP's license on November 3, 2022. The station changed its call sign to KVGK-LP on March 10, 2023.

On October 4, 2023, the FCC cancelled KVGK-LP's license due to the station having been silent since September 4, 2022.
