= KNCJ =

- Reno, Nevada; United States
- Broadcast area: Northern Nevada
- Frequency: 89.5 MHz
- Branding: KNCJ, Nevada Classical and Jazz

Programming
- Format: Classical music and jazz
- Affiliations: NPR; APM; PRX; Classical 24

Ownership
- Owner: University of Nevada, Reno; (Board of Regents of the Nevada System of Higher Education)
- Sister stations: KUNR

History
- First air date: December 1, 2016
- Former call signs: KJIV (2007–2015, CP)
- Call sign meaning: Nevada Classical and Jazz

Technical information
- Licensing authority: FCC
- Facility ID: 78489
- Class: A
- ERP: 1,600 watts
- HAAT: 142 meters (466 ft)
- Transmitter coordinates: 39°15′34″N 119°42′16″W
- Translators: 88.1 K201FV (Truckee, CA)

Links
- Public license information: Public file; LMS
- Webcast: Listen live
- Website: KNCJ Online

KNCJ (89.5 FM) is a non-commercial radio station licensed to Reno, Nevada, United States. Owned by the University of Nevada, Reno, it plays classical music during the week with jazz on weekend evenings. KNCJ's studios are on North Virginia Street in Reno, inside Edmund J. Cain Hall on the university campus.

The transmitter is off McGuffey Road in Sun Valley, Nevada. Programming is also heard on 65-watt FM translator K201FV (88.1 FM) in Truckee, California.

== History ==
Like many NPR station in the early 2000s, 89.7 KUNR broadcast a mix news, talk and information on weekdays, with classical music nights and weekends. Some listeners wanted an all-information station and some wanted classical music throughout the day. To satisfy both audiences, KUNR management decided to put its music programming on another station and devote KUNR to a full time news and information format.

In nearby Truckee, California, Truckee Meadows Community College had planned to put a college radio station on the air. It received a construction permit from the Federal Communications Commission in 2007. It was given the call sign KJIV. But before the station was built, the school decided in 2015 to sell its construction permit to KUNR to become its sister station.

KNCJ signed on the air on December 1, 2016. It became the station in Reno for classical music, mostly supplied by Classical 24. On weekend nights, it carries jazz programming, mostly from the Public Radio Exchange (PRX).

== Programming ==
On weekdays, KNCJ carries Classical 24, an all-classical music network from American Public Media (APM) and the Public Radio Exchange (PRX). News updates are supplied at the beginning of some hours from NPR and the KUNR newsroom. Weeknights include broadcasts of the New York Philharmonic and Chicago Symphony Orchestra. The Metropolitan Opera is heard, in season, on Saturday mornings.

On weekend evenings, KNCJ turns to jazz. It has its own four-hour jazz show each week, Saturday Night Jazz, hosted by northern Nevada residents Dallas Smith and Scot Marshall. It also carries Jazz After Hours from PRX, heard overnight on Fridays and Saturdays.
