= KRAT (FM) =

Radio station in Sparks–Reno, Nevada

- Sparks, Nevada; United States
- Broadcast area: Reno, Nevada
- Frequency: 92.1 MHz (HD Radio)
- Branding: Alt 92.1

Programming
- Format: Alternative rock

Ownership
- Owner: Evans Broadcast Company, Inc.
- Sister stations: KKFT, KRFN

History
- First air date: 1993 (as KSRN)
- Former call signs: KVRX (1990–1991, CP); KSRN (1991–2000); KJZS (2000–2010); KWFP (2010–2018)

Technical information
- Licensing authority: FCC
- Facility ID: 13528
- Class: C3
- ERP: 10,500 watts
- HAAT: 153 meters (502 ft)
- Transmitter coordinates: 39°35′2.6″N 119°48′9.6″W
- Repeater: 92.1 KRAT-FM2 (Carson City)

Links
- Public license information: Public file; LMS
- Webcast: Listen live
- Website: alt921reno.com

KRAT (92.1 MHz, "Alt 92.1") is a commercial FM radio station located in Sparks, Nevada, broadcasting to the Reno area airing an alternative rock format. Its studios are located in Reno near the Reno–Tahoe International Airport, with a secondary office in Carson City, and its transmitter is located on Red Hill in North Reno.

== History ==
The station signed on the air in 1993 as KSRN with an easy listening format. In 2000, KSRN moved to a stronger signal at 107.7 FM to cover the Carson City and Lake Tahoe areas. As a result, the 92.1 frequency became home to KJZS with its smooth jazz format. On September 13, 2010, KJZS changed its format to country, branded as "The Wolf", leaving the Reno radio market without a smooth jazz outlet. On November 9, 2010, KJZS changed its call letters to KWFP, to go with the "Wolf" branding. The Evans Broadcast Company, Inc. purchased this station, along with KURK in May 2016 from Wilks Broadcast Group. Evans already owned KCMY and KKFT.

On August 25, 2018, at midnight, KWFP changed its format from country (which moved to KRFN-HD2 and 95.1) to alternative rock, branded as "Alt 92.1". The station changed its call sign from KWFP to KRAT on September 14, 2018.

== KRAT-HD2 ==
On December 28, 2023, KRAT launched an adult album alternative format on its HD2 subchannel, branded as "94.9 X", simulcast on FM translator K235DC (94.9) in Reno. As of August 2025, KRAT-HD2 was shut off and its translator moved back to KRFN-HD2 under a Spanish format.

== Booster ==
Call sign	Frequency	City of license	FID	ERP (W)	Class	Transmitter coordinates	FCC info
KRAT-FM2	92.1 FM	Carson City, Nevada	199465	45	D	39°12′49.7″N 119°46′13.7″W	LMS
