= KZTQ (AM) =

Radio station in Sparks–Reno, Nevada

- Sparks, Nevada; United States
- Broadcast area: Reno, Nevada
- Frequency: 1270 kHz
- Branding: 92.5 The Hog

Programming
- Format: Classic rock

Ownership
- Owner: Reno Media Group; (Americom Limited Partnership)
- Sister stations: KODS; KLCA; KOLC; KBZZ; KRNO

History
- First air date: 1960
- Last air date: 2026
- Former call signs: KBUB (1960–1973); KWRL (1973–1979); KROI (1979–1984); KORY (1984–1985); KPLY (1985–2001); KBZZ (2001–2018); KSGG (2018); KZTQ (2018–2019); KBZZ (2019–2025)

Technical information
- Licensing authority: FCC
- Facility ID: 48684
- Class: B
- Power: 10,000 watts (day); 5,000 watts (night)
- Transmitter coordinates: 39°32′1.7″N 119°39′49.7″W
- Translator: see below
- Repeater: 106.9 KRNO-HD2 (Incline Village)

Links
- Public license information: Public file; LMS
- Webcast: Listen live
- Website: thehogfm.com

KZTQ (1270 kHz, "92.5 The Hog") was an AM radio station broadcasting a classic rock format. Licensed to Sparks, Nevada, United States, the station was part of Tom Quinn's Reno Media Group and served the Reno–Sparks metropolitan area. The station was owned by Americom Limited Partnership. The station's studios were located on Matley Lane in East Reno, and its transmitter was located east of Sparks. It operated from 1960 to 2026.

== History ==
The station was first licensed as KBUB on August 5, 1960. It changed its call sign to KWRL on January 19, 1973; to KROI on November 1, 1979; to KORY on February 11, 1984; and to KPLY on March 1, 1985.

KPLY enjoyed local and regional success while being hosted by long time sports announcer "Bob D." (Robert Dirosario), and his sports sidekick, "Truckee" Mike Leach. Frequent guest Reno sports experts included sportsbook director John Pinto of the Silver Legacy Reno, the late Paul Sonner, who was the owner of Bully's Sports Bars, sportsbook manager Eric Brownlee of the Club Cal Neva, sports handicapping expert and bookmaker Chris Andrews, (who is now the sportsbook director with The South Point in Las Vegas), and Friday night horse racing coverage and analysis with "Pony" Bob Wilkie. The Bob D. KPLY daily sports morning program offered extensive information on sports and sports wagering for the average fan, and also the more knowledgeable fan. The Jim Rome Show was a long running staple on KPLY, as was the Sports Fan Radio Network.

The call sign was changed to KBZZ on March 5, 2001. Prior to that time, the call letters KBZZ were used by a long-standing news and music station in La Junta, Colorado, now KBLJ. Adopting the nickname "The Buzz", the station added Howard Stern in mornings, followed by a local show with Bob Garrison, the syndicated Don and Mike Show and then the syndicated Tom Leykis in late afternoons. Tom Quinn, president of Americom Broadcasting (owner of KBZZ), had selected the "hot talk" format after his success with Stern in Las Vegas. KBZZ immediately became the top-rated AM station in Reno, beating long-time news/talk station KKOH.

However, after a decade of success, a number of factors hurt KBZZ. With Stern's move to satellite radio, Don Geronimo's decision to quit his show and CBS Radio's decision to drop the Tom Leykis syndicated program, those changes severely damaged KBZZ's ratings. Finally on January 14, 2013, the station changed its format to sports, with programming from CBS Sports Radio. Local Reno hosts for sports and chat included Panama and Truckee Mike Leach.

On July 25, 2016, KBZZ changed again from sports to progressive talk, branded as "96.1 & 1270 AM The Buzz".

On March 15, 2018, KBZZ changed calls to KSGG (with the KBZZ calls moving to Quinn's 1230 AM), coinciding with the announcement that 93.7's variety hits format would move to 1270 and 96.1 the following Monday, March 26. On March 23, 2018, KSGG changed call letters to KZTQ and launched the "Bob FM" variety hits format three days later. The adult hits "Bob FM" format was first broadcast in Reno on Quinn's 97.3 FM frequency, which is now home to Reno's top-rated country radio station KOLC, called "Ten Country".

On September 13, 2019, KBZZ and KZTQ exchanged call letters, formats, and associated translators: Bob FM and the KZTQ call letters moved to 1230 AM but kept its 96.1 and 96.9 FM translators, while 92.5 FM (nominally a repeater of KRNO-HD2), which had been airing a classic hip-hop format, flipped to sports talk as 92.5 The Game, as an affiliate of the BetR Network. On September 9, 2020, the station flipped to oldies as Oldies 92.5.

On April 2, 2021, KBZZ flipped to classic rock, branded as "92.5 The Hog". KBZZ and KZTQ again swapped call signs on March 24, 2025.

Americom Limited Partnership requested the cancellation of the KZTQ license on August 7, 2026. It was cancelled on August 10.

== FM translators ==
Broadcast translators for KZTQ
Call sign	Frequency	City of license	FID	ERP (W)	HAAT	Class	FCC info
K223AL	92.5 FM	Reno, Nevada	83337	250	151 m (495 ft)	D	LMS
K245DC	96.9 FM	Carson City, Nevada	202050	40	118 m (387 ft)	D	LMS

Americom requested the cancellation of the K245DC license on August 7, 2026. It was cancelled on August 10.
