= KNNR =

Radio station in Sparks, Nevada

Coordinates: 39°34′9.7″N 119°45′6.7″W

Simulcasts KPGF Sun Valley
- Sparks, Nevada; United States
- Broadcast area: Central and Northern Nevada
- Frequency: 1400 kHz
- Branding: Northern Nevada's Voice

Programming
- Format: Variety

Ownership
- Owner: Donald Brown and Cynthia Green; (Silver State Broadcasting LLC)

History
- First air date: 2000; 26 years ago
- Former call signs: KBDB (2000–2012)

Technical information
- Licensing authority: FCC
- Facility ID: 89558
- Class: C
- Power: 1,000 watts
- Translator: 103.3 K277DL (Washoe Valley)

Links
- Public license information: Public file; LMS
- Website: northernnevadasvoice.net

KNNR (1400 AM) is a commercial radio station based in Reno, Nevada. It is owned and operated by Donald Brown and Cynthia Green, through licensee Silver State Broadcasting LLC.

== History ==
Logo as a Regional Mexican station (2013–2017)

KBDB came to air in 2000 and eventually broadcast a smooth jazz format. After two months off the air, KBDB became KNNR in 2012 with taped city hearings and for a time, The Savage Nation, which was moved back to KKOH and later discontinued.

In September 2013, the station began airing Regional Mexican programming via MVS Radio's La Mejor network. At the start of 2017, it switched to a full-time simulcast of sister station KELY, which airs on three other stations in Northern Nevada. They are collectively branded as the "Nevada Talk Network."

KNNR (alongside former satellite partner KELY) was the local Reno radio partner for the Vegas Golden Knights of the National Hockey League.

In November 2022, KNNR began broadcasting a Spanish AC format under the branding "Radio Xtasis" under ownership of Silver State Broadcasting, LLC. In September 2023, the station began to be simulcast on KXEG 1280 AM in Phoenix, Arizona under a local marketing agreement with the then-receiver Media Services Group. KXEG has since gone on to become owned by Donald Brown, who is a co-owner of Silver State Broadcasting, and broadcast a multitude of its own formats separate from this station.

In February 2026, KNNR and translator K277DL filed for a Silent STA. The station later returned to the air in July 2026, launching a community-focused simulcast with KPGF 93.7 FM Sun Valley called "Northern Nevada's Voice".
