= Kenya Agricultural Commodity Exchange =

Financial service company in Kenya

Kenya Agricultural Commodity Exchange is a private sector firm in Kenya. It was established in 1997, after being incorporated in 1992. KACE primarily functions as an information service to enhance price discovery as well as a spot exchange. Futures contracts are not traded on KACE.

The main objective of Kenya Agricultural Commodity Exchange is to facilitate linkage between buyers and sellers, exporters and importers of agricultural commodities in trade. It provide farmers and market intermediaries such as traders, and consumers, with information about market, and other services that enhance their bargaining power and competitiveness in the market place. It also provide a transparent and competitive price discovery mechanism through the operations of the exchange trading floors and apply information and communication technologies for rural value addition and empowerment.

KACE signed an agreement with West Media Limited (WML), owners of the West FM Radio Station located in Bungoma Town in Western Province of Kenya, where they have established an interactive radio program called Soko Hewani which means The Supermarket On Air in Swahili.

Offers and bids are announced on the Soko Hewani program. Listeners, then bid on the offers through phone, SMS, IVR or e-mail messages. The radio program staff then match the offers and bids as the program is on air, then using mobile phone calls and SMS, or reference back to the specific MRC which submitted the offer or bid for further negotiation and conclusion of deals.
