= KLSQ =

Radio station in Whitney–Las Vegas, Nevada

- Whitney, Nevada; United States
- Broadcast area: Las Vegas metropolitan area
- Frequency: 870 kHz
- Branding: 870 AM

Programming
- Language: Spanish
- Format: Regional Mexican; Spanish AC

Ownership
- Owner: Latino Media Network; (Latino Media Network, LLC)
- Sister stations: KRGT; KISF

History
- First air date: August 15, 1986
- Last air date: October 2026
- Former call signs: KROL (1985–1991); KOWA (1991–1995)

Technical information
- Licensing authority: FCC
- Facility ID: 36694
- Class: B
- Power: 5,000 watts (day); 430 watts (night)
- Transmitter coordinates: 35°58′34.9″N 114°57′6″W

Links
- Public license information: Public file; LMS

KLSQ (870 AM) was a commercial radio station licensed to Whitney, Nevada, United States, that served the Las Vegas metropolitan area. Owned by the Latino Media Network, LLC it featured a format of Spanish adult contemporary and Regional Mexican music. Under a local marketing agreement (LMA), it was programmed by previous owner TelevisaUnivision's Uforia Audio Network until 2024.

KLSQ's transmitter was located south of Mission Hills Park in Henderson.

== History ==
=== KROL ===
The station signed on the air on August 15, 1986, as KROL, licensed to Laughlin, Nevada. It was founded by "Laughlin Roughrider Broadcasting" and it operated from two tower sites. A three-tower array was built in Laughlin for a 10,000 watt day and 1,000 watt night operation, using a directional antenna system. The other site was near Henderson and was the KROL experimental synchronous transmitter, using a non-directional antenna by day and a three-tower directional system by night.

After KVEG (840 AM) went on the air, measurements were made showing that a power increase would not cause prohibited overlap with KROL on 870 AM. This allowed KROL an increase to 5,000 watts days but still at 500 watts nights. Both sites used diesel generators to produce all of the power that was needed to broadcast.

=== Spanish hits ===
The station was sold to Million Dollar Broadcasting and changed its call sign to KOWA, known as "The Cow". Heftel Broadcasting (HBC) bought the station in 1995 and changed to a format of Spanish hits.

Management at HBC were concerned that the bulk of population covered by KOWA was from the second transmitter in the Las Vegas metropolitan area. This coverage was licensed as a secondary authorization, and was subject to cancellation with little or no prior notice. David Stewart at HBC Engineering found a way to make the northern signal the main (and only) site. The city of license was changed from Laughlin to Whitney (which combined some of unincorporated Clark County with the former village of East Las Vegas). The former main transmitter site in Laughlin was decommissioned. The Laughlin towers are used by other area stations, including radio stations KFLG and KZZZ, and, at one time, the analog operation of KMCC.

=== Spanish sports ===
On December 20, 2016, Univision Radio announced that KLSQ would be one of the charter affiliates of the company's new Spanish-language sports radio network, Univision Deportes Radio, which launched in early 2017.

KLSQ went silent in late 2019. On December 12, 2020, KLSQ resumed broadcasting as a simulcast of KISF's Regional Mexican format. The station later returned to the Spanish sports network, rebranded TUDN Radio.

=== Latino Media Network ===
On June 3, 2022, Univision announced it would sell a package of 18 radio stations across ten of its markets, primarily AM outlets in large cities (including KLSQ) and entire clusters in smaller markets such as McAllen, Texas, and Fresno, California. The price tag was $60 million. The owner would be a new company known as the Latino Media Network (LMN). Univision proposed to handle operations for a year under agreement before turning over operational control to LMN in the fourth quarter of 2023.

The sale was approved by the Federal Communications Commission (FCC) that November. The transaction was completed on December 30, 2022.

After almost a year of being silent, KLSQ returned to the air to play a Spanish AC/Regional Mexican Format by the end of 2024, taking up the frequency as its name "870 AM', similar to Texas sister stations KLAT in Houston and KFLC in Dallas.

In October 2026, KLSQ's license was surrendered to the FCC. The license was cancelled on October 5.
