= KELY =

- Ely, Nevada; United States
- Broadcast area: Central and Northern Nevada
- Frequency: 1230 kHz
- Branding: Nevada Talk Network

Programming
- Format: Talk radio
- Affiliations: Townhall News; Red Apple Audio Networks; Vegas Golden Knights

Ownership
- Owner: Ely Radio, LLC

History
- First air date: July 8, 1950
- Call sign meaning: Ely

Technical information
- Licensing authority: FCC
- Facility ID: 55462
- Class: C
- Power: 250 watts unlimited
- Transmitter coordinates: 39°15′45″N 114°51′46″W
- Translator: 98.5 K253CJ (Ely)

Links
- Public license information: Public file; LMS
- Webcast: Listen live
- Website: www.kely1230.com

KELY (1230 AM) is a commercial radio station broadcasting a talk radio format. Licensed to Ely, Nevada, United States, the station is owned and operated by Ely Radio, LLC and features programming from the Genesis Communications Network and WABC's Red Apple Audio Networks. It also broadcasts the independently syndicated programs following the locally produced Your Morning program hosted by station manager Wyatt Cox. On February 7, 2022, KELY launched a translator in Ely on 98.5 MHz FM with the callsign K253CJ. KELY's programming was simulcast on KAVB in Hawthorne, but according to a July 1 blog post on the station's web site, that ended around July 1, 2024.

== History ==
KELY's history dates back to June 1950 when it was launched by founders David Hanson and Dale Bradley. The station originally broadcast from the historic Hotel Nevada in Ely for over 70 years. In 1986, the station expanded to the FM dial as KELY-FM 101.7 under Reed Communications. After several ownership changes, KELY and what had become KCLS were split in 2005.

The KCLS license eventually moved out of the Ely area and is now part of the Canyon Media Group in St. George, Utah. KELY serves as the flagship station for the Nevada Talk Network, extending its local and syndicated programming across much of rural Nevada. The station is an affiliate for the Vegas Golden Knights hockey team.
