= KRNO =

Radio station in Incline Village–Reno, Nevada

Coordinates: 39.310°N 119.885°W

- Incline Village, Nevada; United States
- Broadcast area: Reno, Nevada
- Frequency: 106.9 MHz (HD Radio)
- Branding: Sunny 106.9

Programming
- Format: Adult contemporary (Christmas music)
- Subchannels: HD2: Classic rock "92.5 The Hog"
- Affiliations: Premiere Networks

Ownership
- Owner: Reno Media Group; (Americom Limited Partnership)
- Sister stations: KBZZ; KODS; KLCA; KOLC

History
- First air date: July 1974
- Call sign meaning: "Reno"

Technical information
- Licensing authority: FCC
- Facility ID: 204
- Class: C
- ERP: 37,000 watts
- HAAT: 908 meters (2,979 ft)
- Translators: 99.5 K258BN (Verdi); 106.3 K292EP (Incline Village); HD2: 92.5 K223AL (Reno)

Links
- Public license information: Public file; LMS
- Webcast: Listen live}
- Website: sunny1069.com thehogfm.com (HD2)

KRNO (106.9 FM, "Sunny 106.9") is a commercial radio station licensed to Incline Village, Nevada, United States, and broadcasting to Reno, Carson City, and surrounding areas, including Lake Tahoe. It is owned by the Reno Media Group and airs an adult contemporary format, with studios on Matley Lane in Reno, and transmitter sited on Slide Mountain.

KRNO also rebroadcasts on FM translators K258BN in Verdi at 99.5 FM to cover northwest Reno and K292EP in Incline Village at 106.3 FM to cover the northern Lake Tahoe area.

== History ==
KRNO signed on the air in July 1974. It was originally licensed in Reno, as the FM counterpart to KCBN (1230 AM). The two stations were owned by B.B.C., Inc. While the AM station played Top 40 hits, KRNO had an easy listening format. In the 1980s, it gradually moved to soft adult contemporary music.

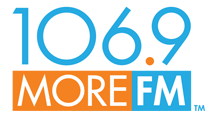
Logo as "More FM"

KRNO dropped its "Sunny" moniker as its prime positioner on March 24, 2014, to become "106.9 More FM". The rebranding, despite the station's high ratings (the station ranked at #2 12+ among subscribing stations in the Fall 2013 Nielsen Audio ratings report), was meant to reflect the updating of the station's playlist to focus on mostly songs released after 2000, with some 1980s and 90s hits.

On September 8, 2022, KRNO rebranded back to its previous brand as "Sunny 106.9".

== Translators ==
KRNO also broadcasts on the following translators:

Broadcast translators for KRNO
Call sign	Frequency	City of license	FID	ERP (W)	HAAT	Class	FCC info
K258BN	99.5 FM	Verdi, Nevada	203	45 vertical	0 m (0 ft)	D	LMS
K292EP	106.3 FM	Incline Village, Nevada	205	99 vertical	0 m (0 ft)	D	LMS

Broadcast translator for KRNO-HD2
Call sign	Frequency	City of license	FID	ERP (W)	HAAT	Class	FCC info
K223AL	92.5 FM	Reno, Nevada	83337	250	151 m (495 ft)	D	LMS
