= KPLY =

Radio station in Reno, Nevada

- Reno, Nevada; United States
- Broadcast area: Reno metropolitan area
- Frequency: 630 kHz
- Branding: Fox Sports Reno Radio 630 am

Programming
- Format: Sports
- Affiliations: Fox Sports Radio; Reno Aces; San Francisco 49ers

Ownership
- Owner: Lotus Communications; (Lotus Radio Corp.)
- Sister stations: KDOT; KFOY; KHIT; KOZZ-FM; KTHX-FM; KXZZ

History
- First air date: September 13, 1928
- Former call signs: KOH (1928–1994); KRCV (1994–1995); KNRC (1995–1996); KHIT (1996–1998); KPTT (1998–2005)
- Call sign meaning: Play

Technical information
- Licensing authority: FCC
- Facility ID: 50304
- Class: B
- Power: 5,000 watts (day); 1,000 watts (night)
- Transmitter coordinates: 39°34′24.7″N 119°50′51.7″W

Links
- Public license information: Public file; LMS
- Webcast: Listen live
- Website: sportsreno.com

KPLY (630 AM) is a commercial radio station licensed to Reno, Nevada, United States. It is owned by Lotus Communications and features a sports format. Its studios are on Plumb Lane in South Reno.

The transmitter is off Hoge Road in Northeast Reno.

== History ==
The station signed on the air on September 13, 1928. Its original call sign was KOH, the oldest radio station in Nevada. It was the last "new station" in the United States to receive a three-letter call sign. In the 1930s, KOH broadcast on 1380 kilocycles with 500 watts. The station was sold to McClatchy in February 1931. The offices and studios were at 440 North Virginia Avenue. KOH was an affiliate of the CBS Radio Network. On October 27, 1982, Klein Broadcasting Co. announced that it would buy KOH from McClatchy for $95,000.

The station continued to use the call sign KOH until March 10, 1994 (March 18, 1994, according to Federal Communications Commission records). In 1994, as part of a complex realignment of stations in the Reno area, KOH's programming and format moved to 780 AM under the callsign KKOH, while 630 AM changed its call sign to KRCV. The 780 station could not use KOH's three-letter call sign because the two stations were not co-owned, so an extra K was added at the beginning but is only said during the hourly station identification.

On March 16, 2005, the station switched to the current KPLY.

== Programming ==
KPLY is the radio home for the Reno Aces baseball team. It also carries San Francisco 49ers football broadcasts.
