= KISF =

Coordinates: 36.008°N 115.006°W

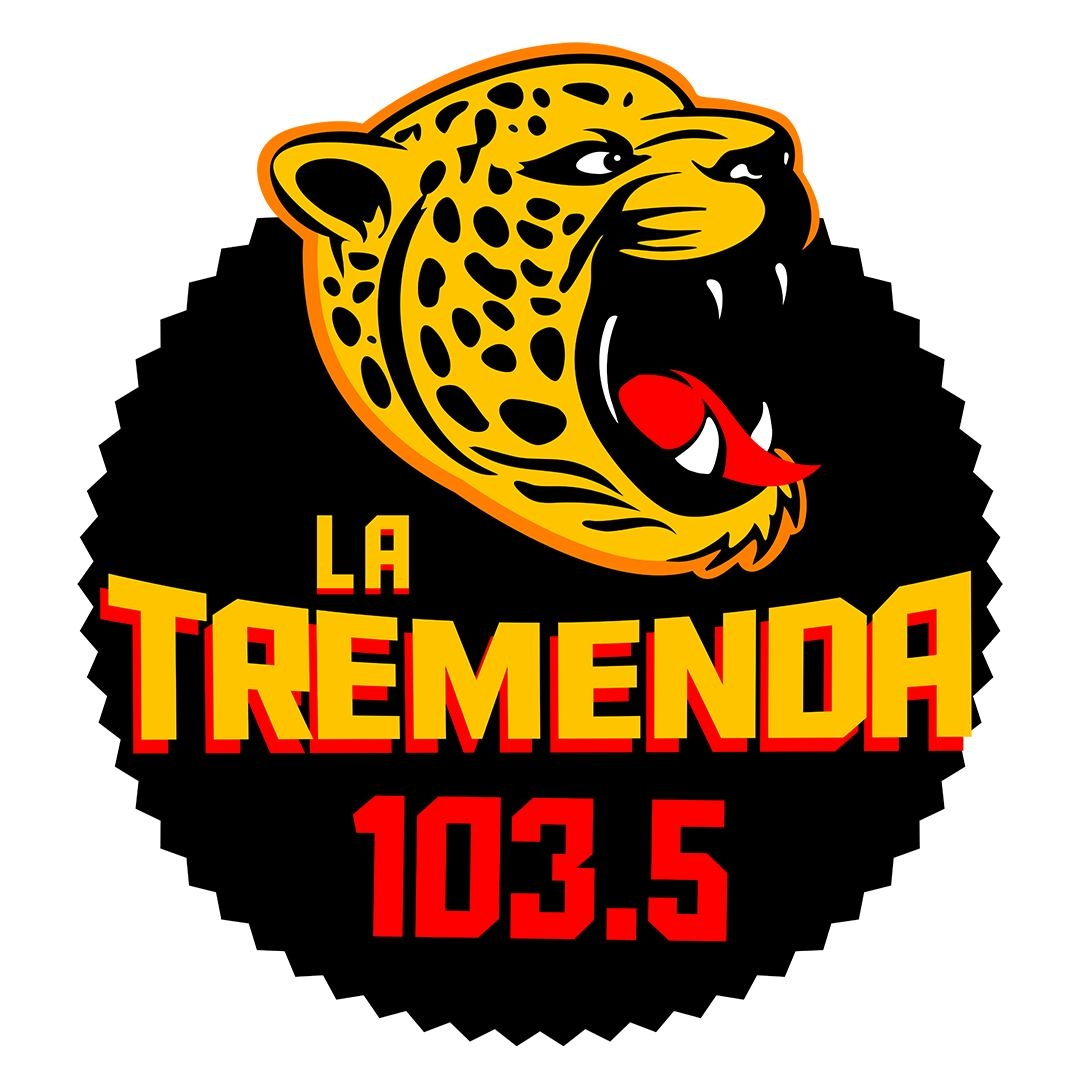
- Las Vegas, Nevada; United States
- Broadcast area: Las Vegas Valley
- Frequency: 103.5 MHz (HD Radio)
- Branding: La Tremenda 103.5

Programming
- Format: Regional Mexican
- Subchannels: HD2: Spanish Adult Hits "LA 103.5 HD2"

Ownership
- Owner: Latino Media Network; (Latino Media Network, LLC)
- Sister stations: KRGT, KLSQ

History
- First air date: February 1989 (as KLTN)
- Former call signs: KLTN (1989–1991); KMMK (1991–1992); KEDG (1992–1998)
- Call sign meaning: "Kiss FM" (previous format)

Technical information
- Licensing authority: FCC
- Facility ID: 28893
- Class: C
- ERP: 100,000 watts
- HAAT: 353 meters (1,158 ft)

Links
- Public license information: Public file; LMS
- Webcast: Listen live (via iHeartRadio)
- Website: https://www.1035latremenda.com/

KISF (103.5 FM, "La Tremenda 103.5") is a commercial radio station located in Las Vegas, Nevada. KISF airs a Regional Mexican music format, and is the Las Vegas affiliate for El Bueno, La Mala, Y El Feo in the morning and El Free-Guey in the afternoon. Its studios are in Spring Valley and its transmitter is on Black Mountain in Henderson. KISF is owned by Latino Media Network; the station was programmed by previous owner TelevisaUnivision's Uforia Audio Network until 2024.

== History ==
=== Adult contemporary (1989–1992) ===
KISF signed on as KLTN with an adult contemporary format as "Lite 103.5" in February 1989. In January 1991, the station rebranded as "Magic 103.5" under new call sign KMMK.

=== Modern rock (1992–1998) ===
On May 22, 1992, the station changed its call sign to KEDG, and adopted a modern rock music format, branded as "The Edge". The station debuted at #1 in the Las Vegas ratings and was influential in other stations nationwide flipping to the format. In 1996, KEDG gained a direct competitor as KFBI adopted a harder edged modern rock music format under the call sign KXTE.

=== R&B oldies (1998–1999) ===
On June 5, 1998, at noon, KEDG flipped to urban oldies under the call sign KISF, and branded as "Kiss-FM".

=== Spanish (1999–present) ===
Previous logo From 2016-2024

In March 1999, Heftel Broadcasting Corporation (which eventually became Univision Radio and then Uforia Audio Network) acquired the frequency, and flipped 103.5 to Regional Mexican as "La Nueva 103.5", becoming the first Spanish FM radio station serving the Las Vegas Hispanic community. On March 24, 2016, KISF rebranded as "Zona MX 103.5".

KISF was one of eighteen radio stations that TelevisaUnivision sold to Latino Media Network in a $60 million deal announced in June 2022, approved by the Federal Communications Commission (FCC) that November, and consummated on December 30, 2022. Under the terms of the deal, Univision agreed to continue programming the station for up to one year under a local marketing agreement.

In June 2023, TelevisaUnivision turned over full operations of the three stations to Latino Media Network, making the Las Vegas market the second market from the company to turn over its operations from TelevisaUnivision, with the first one being the McAllen-Brownsville-Harlingen market in the spring of 2023.

The Current Programming for the station is as follows; El Bueno, La Mala, y El Feo: 6AM-10AM, DJ Izma: 10AM-4PM, El Free-Guey Show: 4PM-8PM, Las Repegadas: 8PM-10PM Y Mas Música Tremenda: 10PM-12AM.
