= KHIT =

Radio station in Reno, Nevada

- Reno, Nevada; United States
- Broadcast area: Reno–Sparks metropolitan area
- Frequency: 1450 kHz
- Branding: ESPN Radio 94.1 - 1450

Programming
- Language: English
- Format: Sports
- Affiliations: ESPN Radio

Ownership
- Owner: Lotus Communications; (Lotus Radio Corp.)
- Sister stations: KDOT; KFOY; KOZZ-FM; KPLY; KTHX-FM; KXZZ

History
- First air date: January 29, 1955 (as KONE)
- Former call signs: KONE (1955–1991); KOZZ (1991–1997); KPTT (1997–1998)

Technical information
- Licensing authority: FCC
- Facility ID: 38458
- Class: C
- Power: 1,000 watts
- Transmitter coordinates: 39°34′27″N 119°50′48″W
- Translator: 94.1 K231CS (Reno)

Links
- Public license information: Public file; LMS
- Website: www.sportsreno.com

KHIT (1450 AM, "ESPN Radio 94.1 - 1450") is a commercial radio radio station that broadcasts a sports radio format. It is licensed to Reno, Nevada, United States and serves the Reno area. The station is currently owned by Lotus Communications. Programming is also heard on FM translator station K231CS at 94.1 MHz. Its studios are located on Plumb Lane in South Reno, and its transmitter is located in northwest Reno.

KHIT is the Reno affiliate of ESPN Radio.

== History ==
=== KONE ===
KONE (referred to as K-ONE) went on the air January 29, 1955. It was Reno's first radio station with a dedicated musical format, airing easy listening and newscasts every two hours and broadcasting with 250 watts. The KONE call sign was released to the station when the United States Coast Guard ship that carried them was sold to Panama. KONE was owned and operated by Tom Magowan, Jim Harford and Fred Jones, who brought experience in making sound installations in many of the hotels in Las Vegas and in Nevada radio. By 1960, however, the station had defaulted on its taxes to Washoe County; later that year, Leland Fuller bought 51 percent of the station for $15,500. The station's financial difficulties at the very start of the decade were further illustrated in 1964, when the Associated Press won $4,520 in unpaid wire service bills that K-ONE never paid.

Under Fuller's management, K-ONE changed formats to country in 1963. After a 1966 relocation of its transmitter and tower, however, the station reverted to a "pleasant listening" sound. It also found itself in more legal trouble when, later that year, the proprietors of 16 copyrighted musical works sued K-ONE for not paying the royalties they were owed for playing such compositions as "San Antonio Rose" and "Sweet Georgia Brown".

KONE was sold to Lotus Radio in 1967 for $135,000, marking the company's entry into the Reno radio market. Among the features of K-ONE's programming in the late 1960s was a three-hour, commercial-free, underground music show aired at night. Lotus expanded when it bought KGLR (105.7 FM) in 1978 and relaunched it the next year as KOZZ.

By 1981, KONE was airing a country format. The station changed to adult contemporary in 1985. Its classic hits sound was supplemented by a heavy dose of sports broadcasts, including Los Angeles Raiders football, Oakland Athletics baseball, and high school sports events. It was also the first station in the market to broadcast in C-QUAM AM stereo. In 1987, KONE shifted to satellite-delivered oldies music from Transtar while retaining popular morning show host Freddy Mertz. Its sports coverage grew again in 1988 with the addition of Nevada Wolf Pack football.

=== KOZZ and KPTT ===
After returning to automated country and finishing far behind its competitors in the format, KONE became a simulcast of KOZZ and became KOZZ itself in 1991, though it continued to break away for sports coverage.

The simulcast with 105.7 FM remained until April 15, 1997, when 1450 AM began carrying its own programming again as talk-formatted KPTT "The Parrot". KPTT carried a mix of political shows from G. Gordon Liddy and Tom Leykis and sports talk with Jim Rome and Pete Rose. KPTT also aired the audio of KOLO-TV's newscasts.

=== KHIT ===
A year after becoming "The Parrot", Lotus switched the formats of its stations at 1450 and 630. The talk programming moved down the dial to 630, while the KHIT country format relocated up the dial to 1450. After a stint with ESPN Radio, the station yet again lost a format to the 630 signal when Lotus opted to put the sports network on KPTT and air adult standards music on KHIT. The station later picked up an affiliation with Fox Sports Radio, which was changed to ESPN Radio in 2010 as part of another swap with the 630 frequency (now KPLY) and a larger format shuffle at Lotus Reno.

KHIT switched to the Spanish-language ESPN Deportes Radio network on July 1, 2012; the station continued to air English-language broadcasts of UNLV Rebels football and the San Diego Chargers to satisfy contractual obligations.

Logo under CBS Sports Radio affiliation

On August 1, 2016, KHIT returned to English-language sports, with programming from NBC Sports Radio. The NBC Sports Radio network became available in Reno when Wilks Broadcasting exited the market and spun off former carrier KFOY to Radio Lazer. In addition, at this time KHIT added an FM translator, K231CS (94.1 FM). In May 2018, KHIT changed sports networks to CBS Sports Radio.

KHIT has been operating at reduced power since 2018 due to a defect in its antenna system, which serves four AM stations; the filtering system presents the KHIT transmitter with a VSWR that is too high for the transmitter to use its full 1,000 watts.
