= KKFT =

Radio station in Gardnerville–Minden–Reno, Nevada

Coordinates: 39.259°N 119.707°W

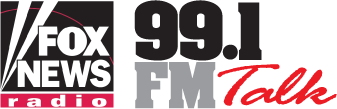
- Gardnerville–Minden, Nevada; United States
- Broadcast area: Reno - Carson City - Sparks
- Frequency: 99.1 MHz (HD Radio)
- Branding: 99.1 FM Talk

Programming
- Format: Talk
- Network: Fox News Radio
- Affiliations: Premiere Networks; Salem Radio Network; Compass Media Networks

Ownership
- Owner: Evans Broadcasting
- Sister stations: KRAT, KRFN

History
- First air date: September 1, 1985; 40 years ago (as KGVM)

Technical information
- Licensing authority: FCC
- Facility ID: 9136
- Class: C2
- ERP: 1,800 watts
- HAAT: 611.7 meters (2,007 ft)
- Repeater: 99.1 KKFT-FM1 (Stateline)

Links
- Public license information: KKFT Public file; LMS
- Webcast: Listen Live
- Website: 991fmtalk.com

KKFT (99.1 MHz, "99.1 FM Talk") is a commercial FM radio station licensed to Gardnerville–Minden, Nevada, and broadcasting to the Reno–Carson City radio market. KKFT airs a talk radio format and is owned and operated by the Evans Broadcast Group.

Studios and offices are on Idaho Street in Carson City. The main transmitter is off Goni Road, also in Carson City. KKFT can also be heard on a 3,250-watt booster station, KKFT-FM1 in Stateline, Nevada.

== Programming ==
On weekdays, KKFT mostly carries nationally syndicated conservative talk programs: Armstrong & Getty, The Lars Larson Show, Fox Across America with Jimmy Failla, The Guy Benson Show, The Larry Elder Show, Markley, Van Camp & Robbins and Coast to Coast AM with George Noory. Weekends feature shows on health, money, home repair, technology and guns. Weekend programs include The Scott Jennings Show, The Larry Kudlow Show, The Ramsey Show with Dave Ramsey, At Home with Gary Sullivan, Gun Talk with Tom Gresham and Ark Midnight with John B. Wells. Most hours begin with world and national news from Fox News Radio.

KKFT once aired a local weekday morning talk show hosted by conservative Monica Jaye. She was formerly at rival talk station 780 KKOH.

== History ==
On September 1, 1985, the station first signed on as KGVM. The station had an effective radiated power (ERP) 3,000 watts from a tower that was minus 815 feet in height above average terrain (HAAT), so its coverage area was limited. The station was owned by Lloyd W. Higuera using the corporate name Carson Valley Radio and it had a soft adult contemporary format.

In 2003, the station was bought by Jerry Evans for $850,000. Evans increased the tower height to its current 2,007 feet (612 meters), giving the station good coverage in the cities of Reno, Sparks and Carson City. The station switched to its current talk format, to compete with the Reno radio market's 50,000-watt talk leader, KKOH, 780 AM, owned and operated by Cumulus Media.
