= KVLV =

- Fallon, Nevada; United States
- Frequency: 980 kHz
- Branding: Country 980

Programming
- Format: Country
- Affiliations: ABC Radio, iHeartMedia

Ownership
- Owner: Lahontan Valley Broadcasting Company, LLC
- Sister stations: KKTU-FM

History
- First air date: 1957

Technical information
- Licensing authority: FCC
- Facility ID: 36243
- Class: D
- Power: 5,000 watts day only
- Transmitter coordinates: 39°29′46.7″N 118°48′53.6″W

Links
- Public license information: Public file; LMS
- Website: Official website

KVLV (980 AM) is a radio station broadcasting a country music format. It is known on air as Country 980. Licensed to Fallon, Nevada, United States, the station is currently owned by Lahontan Valley Broadcasting Company, LLC and features programming from ABC Radio and iHeartMedia. It is a daytimer. In order to protect other stations on the frequency, the station must sign off at local sunset. In past elections, the station has streamed candidate debates. The station is a member of the Nevada Broadcasters Association. The station broadcasts local school closures, church services, as well as interviews with local authors.

== History ==
The station was first licensed in 1957 as KVLV. The transmitter was two miles outside of Fallon. Originally, the station was on 1250 kHz. The station switched to its current frequency in 1962 and increased power to 5,000 watts.
