= KUNV =

Coordinates: 36.0078°N 115.0064°W

Las Vegas, Nevada; United States
- Broadcast area: Las Vegas Valley
- Frequency: 91.5 MHz (HD Radio)
- Branding: 91.5 Jazz and More

Programming
- Format: Smooth Jazz
- Subchannels: HD2: The Beat (Top 40, hip-hop and electronic dance music); HD3: KUNR simulcast (News/Talk)

Ownership
- Owner: University of Nevada, Las Vegas

History
- First air date: April 21, 1981
- Call sign meaning: University of Nevada

Technical information
- Licensing authority: FCC
- Class: C1
- ERP: 12,000 watts
- HAAT: 588 meters (1,929 ft)

Links
- Public license information: Public file; LMS
- Webcast: Listen Live; Listen Live (HD2); Listen Live (HD3)
- Website: unlv.edu/KUNV

KUNV (91.5 FM) is a non-commercial, listener-supported, public radio station licensed to Las Vegas, Nevada. It airs smooth jazz radio format and is owned by the University of Nevada, Las Vegas (UNLV). The studios and offices are located in Greenspun Hall along University Road at Maryland Parkway on the UNLV campus.

KUNV is a Class C1 station. It has an effective radiated power (ERP) of 12,000 watts. The transmitter is on Arden Peak in Henderson. KUNV broadcasts using HD Radio technology. Its HD2 subchannel plays a Top 40, hip-hop, and electronic dance music (EDM) format produced by UNLV students. The HD3 subchannel carries a News/Talk format simulcasting the other public radio station owned by the Nevada System of Higher Education, KUNR.

== History ==
KUNV signed on the air on April 21, 1981. It began as a student radio station, giving UNLV students an opportunity to train for careers in broadcasting. It was powered at 15,000 watts on a tower only 45 feet (14 meters) tall. In the mid-1980s, it got a construction permit from the Federal Communications Commission (FCC) to increase its tower height to more than 1,100 feet (335 meters).

In November 2011, KUNV HD-2 launched The Morning Rebellion Show, a student-run wake-up program designed to offer training on how to assemble and execute a professional morning show. Industry professional Lynn Briggs was the initial mentor.

In March 2012, KUNV officially became known as 91.5 The Source, a name change intended to reflect that the station is the community's source for diverse programming unavailable on commercial radio. The station also became a Billboard reporter, making it one of very few public radio stations to ever hold that honor. During the same month the station also dropped its NPR affiliation and added PRI programming to its lineup, including the nationally syndicated "The Takeaway" program.

In January 2014, KUNV discontinued its PRI programming and shifted focus to locally produced programming. A few syndicated programs are obtained through PRX which air in the evenings.

In July 2014, KUNV was nominated by the National Association of Broadcasters for the inaugural Marconi award for Noncommercial Station of the Year. The other nominees were KCPW, WEAA, WRHU, and WSDP.

Logo as The Source

In May, 2015, student programming made a return to the main station with a format reflecting what is done on the HD-2 station. Student programming runs from 9p-3a and includes independent rock, underground hip hop, and electronic music on weekdays and eclectic programming on the weekends.

== See also ==
- List of jazz radio stations in the United States
