= KFOY (AM) =

- Sparks, Nevada; United States
- Broadcast area: Reno–Sparks metropolitan area
- Frequency: 1060 kHz
- Branding: Radio For America

Programming
- Format: Conservative talk
- Affiliations: Compass Media Networks; Premiere Networks; Salem Radio Network; Townhall News

Ownership
- Owner: Lotus Communications; (Lotus Radio Corp.)
- Sister stations: KDOT; KHIT; KOZZ-FM; KPLY; KTHX-FM; KXZZ

History
- First air date: 2015

Technical information
- Licensing authority: FCC
- Facility ID: 160030
- Class: B
- Power: 5,000 watts (day); 500 watts (night)
- Transmitter coordinates: 39°34′25″N 119°50′52″W

Links
- Public license information: Public file; LMS
- Webcast: Listen live
- Website: radio4americareno.com

KFOY (1060 AM) is a radio station broadcasting a conservative talk radio format. Licensed to Sparks, Nevada, United States, the station serves the Reno–Sparks metropolitan area. The station is owned by Lotus Communications.

KFOY previously served as the Reno Spanish language affiliate for the San Francisco Giants Radio Network. KFOY also served as the Reno Spanish affiliate for the Las Vegas Raiders Radio Network.

On September 5, 2022, KFOY changed its format to conservative talk, branded as "Radio For America".
