= KRGT (FM) =

Coordinates: 36.3244°N 115.5670°W

- Sunrise Manor, Nevada; United States
- Broadcast area: Las Vegas Valley
- Frequency: 99.3 MHz
- Branding: Latino Beats 99.3

Programming
- Language: Spanish
- Format: Contemporary Hit Radio

Ownership
- Owner: Latino Media Network; (Latino Media Network, LLC)
- Sister stations: KISF; KLSQ

History
- First air date: 2000; 26 years ago
- Former call signs: KPXC (1991–2002); KQMR (2002–2005)

Technical information
- Licensing authority: FCC
- Facility ID: 11614
- Class: C2
- ERP: 8,800 watts
- HAAT: 690 meters (2,260 ft)

Links
- Public license information: Public file; LMS
- Webcast: Listen live (via iHeartRadio)
- Website: https://www.993latinobeats.com/

KRGT (99.3 MHz) is a commercial FM radio station licensed to Sunrise Manor, Nevada, broadcasting to the Las Vegas Valley. KRGT airs a Spanish contemporary hits format branded as "Latino Beats 99.3". This station also routinely plays English-language pop hits by non-Hispanic artists. KRGT is owned by the Latino Media Network; under a local marketing agreement (LMA), it was programmed by previous owner TelevisaUnivision's Uforia Audio Network until 2024. Its studios are in Spring Valley.

KRGT has an effective radiated power (ERP) of 8,800 watts. Its transmitter is atop Black Mountain southeast of the Las Vegas.

== History ==
=== Early years ===
The station signed on in 2000, as KPXC. The station construction permit had existed for years and had been planned as a 6,000-watt operation. Changes were made to run it as a minimal 100 watt operation. The station was owned by Claire Reis Benesara, manager of KDWN radio in its pre-Beasley days.

The engineering department of HBC (predecessor of present-day Uforia Audio Network) moved several stations around in frequency to accommodate the new station. The tower was located on Angel Peak where it operated as a Class C0 station. Dana Demerjiana was the general manager, Eric Martel was the engineering manager and David Stewart of HBC corporate organized the upgrade (basically an HBC specialty).

Previous logo

=== Sale to Latino Media ===
KRGT was one of eighteen radio stations that TelevisaUnivision sold to Latino Media Network in a $60 million deal announced in June 2022 and approved by the Federal Communications Commission (FCC) that November. The deal was completed on December 30. Under the terms of the pact, Univision agreed to continue programming the station for up to one year under a local marketing agreement (LMA).

On January 1, 2024, KRGT rebranded as "Latino Beats 99.3". While the station has most announcements and commercials in Spanish, it also airs pop hits by English-speaking artists.
