= KDOT (FM) =

- Reno, Nevada; United States
- Broadcast area: Reno metropolitan area
- Frequency: 104.5 MHz
- Branding: Rock 104.5

Programming
- Format: Active rock
- Affiliations: United Stations Radio Networks

Ownership
- Owner: Lotus Communications; (Lotus Radio Corp.)
- Sister stations: KFOY; KHIT; KOZZ-FM; KPLY; KTHX-FM; KXZZ

History
- First air date: October 1966
- Former call signs: KSRN, KSRN-FM (1966–1987); KIIQ-FM (1987–1991); KHIT-FM (1991–1996)

Technical information
- Licensing authority: FCC
- Facility ID: 38457
- Class: C
- ERP: 25,000 watts
- HAAT: 893 meters (2,930 ft)
- Transmitter coordinates: 39.313°N 119.884°W

Links
- Public license information: Public file; LMS
- Webcast: Listen Live
- Website: kdot.com

KDOT (104.5 MHz) is a commercial FM radio station located in Reno, Nevada. KDOT airs an active rock music format. Its studios are located on Plumb Lane in South Reno, and its transmitter is located on Slide Mountain.

== History ==
Former logo

KSRN ("Know Stereo Radio Nevada") began broadcasting in October 1966. It was the second commercial FM station in Reno. The station was KSRN until flipping to country as KIIQ in 1987.

Steve Funk was the first program director of KDOT-FM while Rob Williams acted as the operations manager for all of the stations within the Lotus Reno building. Over the first year, some changes in the lineup occurred, the largest being Steve Funk moving to afternoons and Rob Williams taking over the morning drive shift (a slot he had previously done under "KHIT-FM"). Brooke left the station soon after and was replaced with Arnie States, making this the early version of what would later become a very successful morning team, "The Rob, Arnie, and Dawn Show".

== Controversy ==
On May 28, 2009, Hosts Rob Williams and Arnie States from "The Rob, Arnie, and Dawn Show" drew media attention by advocating violence against LGBT children during their show, in reference to two recent news stories regarding transgender children. States said, "God forbid if my son put on a pair of high heels, I would probably hit him with one of my shoes". Williams and States took turns referring to gender dysphoric children as "idiots" and "freaks," who were just out "for attention" and had "a mental disorder that just needs to somehow be gotten out of them," either by verbal abuse on the part of the parents, or even shock therapy. In response, several advertisers (including Snapple, Sonic, Carl's Jr, Bank of America, Wells Fargo, Verizon, Chipotle Grill, AT&T, and McDonald's) pulled their advertising from KRXQ. Nissan similarly declined to renew an advertising contract with the station. On June 8, 2009, GLAAD announced that the show would issue an apology during a special broadcast including a transgender person.
