= KUNR =

Public radio station in Reno, Nevada

KUNR and KNCC

KUNR: Reno, Nevada; KNCC: Elko, Nevada; United States
- Broadcast area: Northern Nevada
- Frequencies: KUNR: 88.7 MHz; KNCC: 91.5 MHz
- Branding: KUNR Public Radio; KNCC Public Radio

Programming
- Format: Public radio and talk
- Affiliations: National Public Radio; Public Radio Exchange; American Public Media; BBC World Service

Ownership
- Owner: University of Nevada, Reno; (Board of Regents of the Nevada System of Higher Education)
- Sister stations: KNCJ

History
- First air date: KUNR: October 7, 1963; KNCC: 1992
- Call sign meaning: KUNR: University of Nevada, Reno

Technical information
- Licensing authority: FCC
- Facility ID: KUNR: 69001; KNCC: 49582
- Class: KUNR: C0; KNCC: A
- ERP: KUNR: 20,000 watts; KNCC: 54 watts
- HAAT: KUNR: 651 meters (2,136 ft); KNCC: 622 meters (2,041 ft)
- Transmitter coordinates: KUNR: 39°15′33.7″N 119°42′19.6″W; KNCC: 40°53′40.7″N 115°37′47.2″W

Links
- Public license information: KUNR: Public file; LMS; KNCC: Public file; LMS
- Webcast: Listen live
- Website: www.kunr.org; www.kunr.org/kncc

KUNR (88.7 FM) and KNCC (91.5 FM) are non-commercial radio stations that jointly carry a talk-oriented public radio format as members of NPR. KUNR is licensed to Reno, Nevada, United States, and KNCC is licensed to Elko, Nevada, United States; both are owned by the University of Nevada, Reno. The studios are located on North Virginia Street in Reno, inside Edmund J. Cain Hall on the university campus.

KUNR's transmitter is in Carson City, while KNCC's transmitter is atop Elko Mountain. Both stations also have a network of low-power FM translators around Nevada and Northern California.

== History ==
KUNR signed on the air on October 7, 1963. It originally broadcast on 88.1 MHz and was powered at only 10 watts, a fraction of its current output. The station could only be heard on campus and adjacent neighborhoods. It was a college radio station, with students hosting most of the shows. Dr. Donald G. Potter, the director of the university's audio-video center, headed the radio station.

It later moved up the dial to 88.7 MHz, increasing its power and relocating its tower to a high peak between Reno and Carson City. With the increase in coverage area, the university decided to change the station's direction. It became a public radio station, airing news, information and classical music. It joined NPR in 1981, adding the network's news shows to its schedule.

In 1992, KNCC signed on the air. It began simulcasting KUNR's programming in the Elko area of Nevada. A network of translators was also added around Nevada and Northern California so KUNR could be heard in those small communities.

In 2016, the university acquired a non-commercial FM station at 89.5 MHz. That station became KNCJ, where the classical music and jazz programming moved. That allowed KUNR to go all news, talk and information, except for a few weekend shows.

KUNR's signal is also heard in Carson City and around Lake Tahoe. The region is also served by another NPR member station, KKTO 90.5 FM in Tahoe City, which simulcasts the news and information programming of KXJZ Sacramento.

== Programming ==
KUNR and KNCC mostly air programs from NPR and other public radio networks, with local Nevada news updates. The weekday schedule includes Morning Edition, All Things Considered, Fresh Air, Here and Now, 1A, Think, The World and Marketplace. The BBC World Service runs overnight.

On weekend evenings, several music shows are heard, including American Routes from the Public Radio Exchange, as well as two shows produced by KUNR: The Risky Biscuit Hayseed Hoot with Dondo Harue and Jimbo's Juke Joint and Roadhouse Cafe with Jim Burke. Both shows play Americana, Folk, Bluegrass music and other genres with a touch of humor.

== Translators ==
KUNR operates about a dozen translators across Nevada and California.

Broadcast translators for KUNR
Call sign	Frequency	City of license	FID	ERP (W)	HAAT	Class	Transmitter coordinates	FCC info	Notes
K210AK	89.9 FM	Incline Village, Nevada	69187	43	143 m (469 ft)	D	39°14′52.6″N 119°55′20.6″W	LMS	
K215CM	90.9 FM	Eureka, Nevada	88142	25	−81.9 m (−269 ft)	D	39°30′40″N 115°57′55.9″W	LMS	
K217AX	91.3 FM	Winnemucca, Nevada	69223	10	0 m (0 ft)	D	41°0′29″N 117°46′12.7″W	LMS	
K218AO	91.5 FM	Hawthorne, Nevada	69009	10	978.8 m (3,211 ft)	D	38°27′25.1″N 118°45′52.3″W	LMS	
K219AR	91.7 FM	Verdi, Nevada	69279	190	0 m (0 ft)	D	39°34′37.6″N 119°56′22.7″W	LMS	
K220BC	91.9 FM	Yerington, Nevada	69363	45	456 m (1,496 ft)	D	38°59′14.6″N 119°14′38.5″W	LMS	
K263AB	100.5 FM	Battle Mountain, Nevada	36496	19	366 m (1,201 ft)	D	40°34′9.6″N 116°41′42.3″W	LMS	Relays KNCC
K201FV	88.1 FM	Truckee, California	87063	65	−188.7 m (−619 ft)	D	39°19′33.4″N 120°11′59.1″W	LMS	
K215BQ	90.9 FM	Bishop, California	69221	20	0 m (0 ft)	D	37°21′18″N 118°11′7.8″W	LMS	
K220DB	91.9 FM	Susanville, California	36654	60	673 m (2,208 ft)	D	40°26′47″N 120°21′29.7″W	LMS	
K237DA	95.3 FM	Tom's Place, California	139742	10	−152.4 m (−500 ft)	D	37°34′7.7″N 118°40′50.4″W	LMS	
K248AT	97.5 FM	Crestview, California	139743	10	−152.4 m (−500 ft)	D	37°42′45.7″N 118°39′29.4″W	LMS	

In addition, KNCC has a translator, K263AB (100.5 FM) in Battle Mountain, Nevada. One translator, K215DN (101.5 FM) in Crescent Valley, Nevada, was shut down. KUNR is also simulcast on KUNV-HD3 serving the Las Vegas Valley.
