= KLRH =

K-Love radio station in Reno, Nevada

Coordinates: 39.584°N 119.803°W

- Reno, Nevada; United States
- Broadcast area: Reno, Nevada
- Frequency: 92.9 MHz
- Branding: K-Love

Programming
- Format: Contemporary Christian

Ownership
- Owner: Educational Media Foundation

History
- First air date: November 1994 (as KZSR)
- Former call signs: KWNJ (3/1990–7/1990, CP); KZSR (1990–1997); KNHK (1997–2003); KURK (2003–2014); KYSA (8/1/2014–8/13/2016)

Technical information
- Licensing authority: FCC
- Facility ID: 64055
- Class: C2
- ERP: 48,000 watts
- HAAT: 153 meters
- Translators: 98.7 K254AK (Reno); 93.1 K226AL (Carson City); 98.5 K253BH (Gardnerville); 95.1 K236AP (Fallon)

Links
- Public license information: Public file; LMS
- Webcast: Listen Live
- Website: klove.com

KLRH is a non-commercial radio station located in Reno, Nevada, broadcasting on 92.9 FM. KLRH airs a contemporary Christian music format branded as "K-Love" under the ownership of Educational Media Foundation (EMF).

Logo as KURK "92.9 The Bandit", used until August 2014.

The station signed on in November 1994 as KZSR. Until August 2014, the station was KURK, a commercial classic rock station owned by Wilks Broadcasting. On May 9, 2014, Wilks that it was selling the station to EMF, which already owned K-Love station KLRH (88.3 FM); the acquisition allowed EMF to bring its Air1 network to Reno. EMF took control of the station on August 1, 2014 and changed the call letters to KYSA; Wilks moved the classic rock format and the KURK call sign to 100.9 FM. On August 13, 2014, KYSA and KLRH swapped call signs. As of September 2016, KLRH was listed as a K-Love station, with KYSA carrying Air1.

== Translators ==
KLRH also broadcasts on the following translators:

Call sign	Frequency	City of license	FID	ERP (W)	Class	FCC info
K254AK	98.7 FM	Reno, Nevada	20892	28	D	LMS
K226AL	93.1 FM	Carson City, Nevada	86510	95	D	LMS
K253BH	98.5 FM	Gardnerville, Nevada	141498	14	D	LMS
K236AP	95.1 FM	Fallon, Nevada	149455	100	D	LMS
