= KTHX-FM =

Radio station in Sun Valley–Reno, Nevada

- Sun Valley, Nevada; United States
- Broadcast area: Reno metropolitan area Lake Tahoe
- Frequency: 94.5 MHz
- Branding: Que Buena 94.5

Programming
- Format: Regional Mexican

Ownership
- Owner: Lotus Communications; (Lotus Radio Corp.)
- Sister stations: KDOT; KFOY; KHIT; KOZZ-FM; KPLY; KXZZ

History
- First air date: 1999 (as KHXR)
- Former call signs: KHXR (1998–2004); KUUB (2004–2021)
- Call sign meaning: Parked callsign from 100.1 as "The X"

Technical information
- Licensing authority: FCC
- Facility ID: 83586
- Class: C2
- ERP: 50,000 watts
- HAAT: 140 meters (460 ft)
- Transmitter coordinates: 39°35′2.00″N 119°47′53.00″W
- Translator: 94.3 K232EA (Carson City)

Links
- Public license information: Public file; LMS
- Website: quebuenareno.com

KTHX-FM (94.5 MHz) is a commercial radio station broadcasting a regional Mexican format. Licensed to Sun Valley, Nevada, it serves the Reno metropolitan area and Lake Tahoe. The station is owned and operated by Lotus Communications. The radio studios are on Plumb Lane in South Reno.

KTHX-FM has an effective radiated power (ERP) of 50,000 watts. The transmitter is located off McGuffrey Road on Red Hill in North Reno. Programming is also heard on a 99 watt FM translator, K232EA, at 94.3 MHz in Carson City, Nevada.

== History ==
The station signed on the air in 1999 as KHXR. In 2004, it changed its call sign to KUUB.

On September 13, 2010, KUUB changed its format from country music to sports with programming from ESPN Radio. On October 5, 2021, the station changed its call sign from KUUB to KTHX-FM. Its sister station on 100.1 MHz, KWEE, had previously used the KTHX-FM call letters from 1997 to October 2021.

On February 6, 2023, KTHX-FM changed its format from sports to Regional Mexican, branded as "Que Buena 94.5".

== Networks ==
KTHX-FM serves as the flagship radio station for the University of Nevada, Reno's athletic teams and the Nevada Wolf Pack Sports Network.

KTHX-FM broadcasts Las Vegas Raiders NFL games as the Reno affiliate for the Raiders Radio Network.

== Previous logo ==
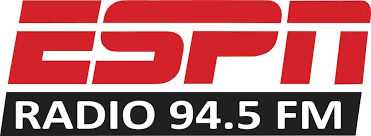
