= KKTU-FM =

- Fallon, Nevada; United States
- Frequency: 99.5 MHz
- Branding: 99.5 K2FM

Programming
- Format: Hot adult contemporary
- Affiliations: AP Radio, Westwood One

Ownership
- Owner: Lahontan Valley Broadcasting Company, LLC
- Sister stations: KVLV

History
- First air date: November 26, 1966 (as KVLV-FM at 99.3)
- Former call signs: KVLV-FM (1966–2011)
- Former frequencies: 99.3 MHz (1966–2011)
- Call sign meaning: K2, the station's branding

Technical information
- Licensing authority: FCC
- Facility ID: 36244
- Class: A
- ERP: 6,000 watts
- HAAT: 76 meters (249 ft)
- Transmitter coordinates: 39°29′47″N 118°48′50″W

Links
- Public license information: Public file; LMS
- Website: Official website

KKTU-FM (99.5 FM) is a radio station broadcasting a hot adult contemporary format. Licensed to Fallon, Nevada, United States, the station is currently owned by Lahontan Valley Broadcasting Company, LLC and features programming from AP Radio and Westwood One. The station is a member of the Nevada Broadcasters Association. KKTU and its sister station KVLV have broadcast candidate debates in the past. The station also carries local events, such as student shout-outs during graduation ceremonies.

== History ==
The station signed on as KVLV-FM in 1966. It switched its callsign in 2011 to KKTU-FM, and moved frequencies from 99.3 MHz to 99.5 MHz. The station covers most of the western half of Churchill County, Nevada.
