= Public News Service =

State-based news services, launched 1996

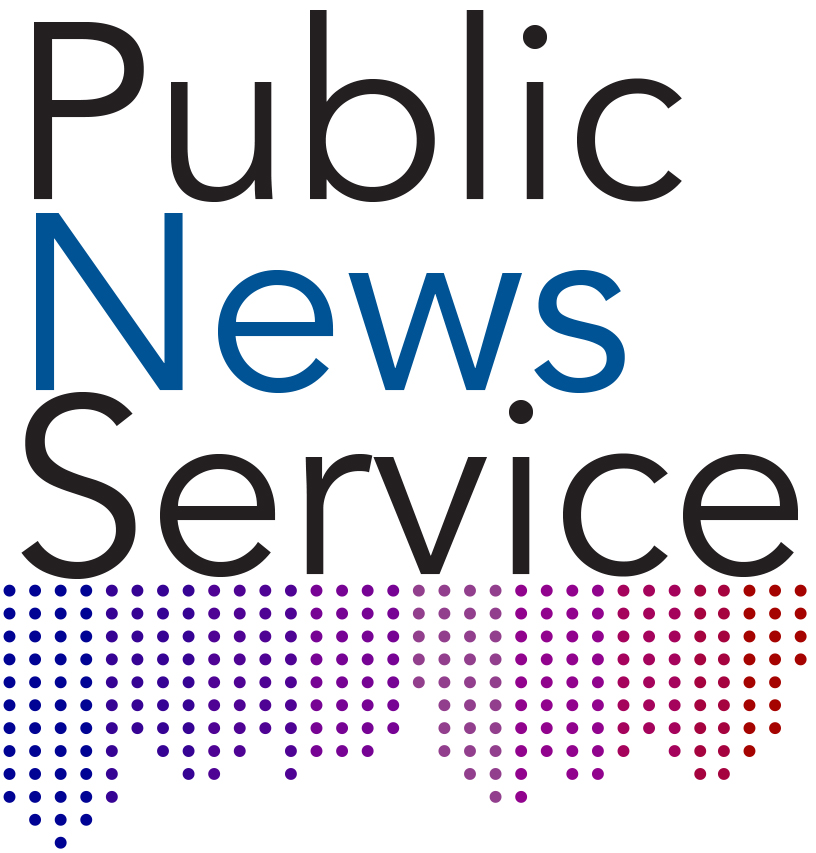
- Company type: B Corporation (certification)
- Industry: News media
- Founded: 1996
- Headquarters: Boulder, Colorado U.S.
- Key people: Lark Corbeil (Founder, Publisher Emeritus) Josh Wise (Publisher)
- Website: www.publicnewsservice.org

Public News Service (usually shortened to PNS) was launched in 1996 by journalist Lark Corbeil in Idaho. Today, PNS has 40 state-based news services that provide multi-platform content for free to news outlets as a way to advocate journalism in the public interest. Josh Wise is the current Publisher.

== History ==
Following the 1996 Telecommunications Act, which allowed for media cross-ownership, Corbeil founded Public News Service as an avenue to examine and reach rural areas.

In May 2017, Dan Heyman, a PNS producer in West Virginia, was arrested at the state capitol for asking former Health and Human Services Secretary Tom Price a question in an "aggressive manner". Heyman was jailed and charged for willful disruption of state government processes. In September 2017, the misdemeanor charge against Heyman was dropped after "a careful review" by the Kanawha County prosecutor's office.

In 2019, PNS, in collaboration with the Pacifica Foundation, developed "2020Talks", a daily three-minute newscast covering the 2020 election primaries, leading up to the Iowa Caucuses. The newscast continues as "2026Talks", changing its name to match the year.

== Funding ==
Public News Service, a certified B Corporation, is funded by grants, gifts, some media contributions, and memberships from individuals, foundations, non-profit organizations and socially responsibly businesses.
