= KXZZ (FM) =

Radio station in Dayton–Reno, Nevada

Coordinates: 39.259°N 119.707°W

Dayton, Nevada; United States
- Broadcast area: Reno metropolitan area; Lake Tahoe
- Frequency: 100.1 MHz
- Branding: 100.1 Hank FM

Programming
- Format: Classic country

Ownership
- Owner: Lotus Communications; (Lotus Radio Corp.)
- Sister stations: KDOT; KFOY; KHIT; KOZZ-FM; KPLY; KTHX-FM

History
- First air date: June 10, 1983
- Former call signs: KLKT (1983–1990); KZAK (1990–1997); KTHX-FM (1997–2021); KWEE (2021–2024)

Technical information
- Licensing authority: FCC
- Facility ID: 48685
- Class: C1
- ERP: 12,000 watts
- HAAT: 659 meters (2,162 ft)
- Translator: 95.9 K240CA (Crystal Bay)

Links
- Public license information: Public file; LMS
- Webcast: Listen live
- Website: www.hankfmreno.com

KXZZ (100.1 FM, "100.1 Hank FM") is a commercial radio station licensed to Dayton, Nevada, and serving the Reno metropolitan area and Lake Tahoe. It is owned by Lotus Communications and broadcasts a classic country format. The radio studios are on Plumb Lane in South Reno.

KXZZ has an effective radiated power (ERP) of 12,000 watts. The transmitter is near Sunil Pandit Road on McClellan Peak northeast of Carson City. Programming is also heard on an FM translator in Crystal Bay, Nevada, K240CA at 95.9 MHz.

== History ==
On June 10, 1983, the station first signed on as KLKT. It later used the call sign KZAK from late 1990 to 1997. That year, it switched its call sign to KTHX-FM. The call sign referred to the station's branding as "The X". The station aired an adult album alternative (AAA) format.

On September 27, 2021, the station announced through their social media that the "X" format would "retire" later that day; at 5:19 p.m., after playing "Here's Where the Story Ends" by The Sundays (immediately followed by simulated audio of a DJ leaving the studio and turning off the lights, branded on the station's online playlist as simply "goodbye X"- intentionally lowercase- and a brief moment of silence), KTHX-FM dropped its longtime AAA format after 24 years on the frequency and 31 years as a whole, and began stunting with instrumental jazz and big band music with sweepers stating that the station was "on hold", and emphasizing that "We will enjoy" the upcoming change to the station, set for 10 a.m. on September 30.

At the promised time, KTHX-FM flipped to adult hits, branded as "100.1 We FM", launching with a typical-for-radio run of 10,000 songs commercial-free, the first being "Get the Party Started" by P!nk. Coinciding with the change, Lotus also applied to change the station's call sign to KWEE, which took effect on October 5. The KTHX-FM call sign was transferred to another station owned by Lotus, at 94.5 MHz in Sun Valley, Nevada, an ESPN Radio Network affiliate that previously used the call letters KUUB. By the end of the format's run, it had rebranded as "100.1 The Hits".

On March 25, 2024, at 5 p.m., the station flipped to classic country as "100.1 Hank FM". The station changed its call sign to KXZZ on March 26.
