= KCMY =

Radio station in Carson City, Nevada

- Carson City, Nevada; United States
- Broadcast area: Carson City, Nevada
- Frequency: 1300 kHz
- Branding: Cowboy Country

Programming
- Format: Classic country
- Affiliations: Fox News Radio

Ownership
- Owner: Jerry Evans; (Evans Broadcast Company, Inc.)

History
- First air date: 1955
- Former call signs: KPTL (1955–2006)

Technical information
- Licensing authority: FCC
- Facility ID: 40801
- Class: B
- Power: 5,000 watts day; 120 watts night
- Transmitter coordinates: 39°9′57.7″N 119°43′36.6″W
- Translator: 102.5 K273AF (Carson City)

Links
- Public license information: Public file; LMS
- Webcast: Listen live
- Website: cowboycountry1025.com

KCMY (1300 AM) is a radio station broadcasting a classic country format, branding itself as "Cowboy Country". Licensed to Carson City, Nevada, United States, the station is owned by Evans Broadcasting Company, Inc. and features programming from Fox News Radio, as well as local news. The station's transmitter is located in Carson City. Its programming is also heard on translator station K273AF (102.5 FM).

KCMY is the English language Reno-area broadcast partner for the San Francisco Giants of Major League Baseball. Spanish language broadcasts are provided by KNEZ.
