= KPGF =

Coordinates: 39.256°N 119.711°W

- Sun Valley, Nevada; United States
- Broadcast area: Reno metropolitan area
- Frequency: 93.7 MHz
- Branding: Northern Nevada's Voice

Programming
- Format: Variety

Ownership
- Owner: World Matters Inc.

History
- First air date: 1998 (as KXXL)
- Former call signs: KANG (1997–1998); KXXL (1998–1999); KATG (1999–2000); KGVN (2000–2001); KWYL (2001–2003); KYWD (2003–2004); KWNZ (2004–2011); KTZQ (2011); KZTQ (2011–2018)

Technical information
- Licensing authority: FCC
- Facility ID: 77800
- Class: A
- ERP: 3,600 watts
- HAAT: 129 meters (423 ft)
- Repeater: KNNR 1400 (Sparks)

Links
- Public license information: Public file; LMS
- Website: northernnevadasvoice.net

KPGF (93.7 MHz) is a commercial FM radio station licensed to Sun Valley, Nevada, and broadcasting to the Reno metropolitan area. It is owned by World Matters Inc. and previously by Flinn Broadcasting.

== History ==
KPGF's former occupant, KWNZ, made its debut on February 14, 1985, as a Top 40 at 97.3 but in 2004 switched frequencies to 93.7. KWNZ launched with morning man Bruce Van Dyke, PD Dave Shakes in middays and MD Todd Fisher, who handled nights and eventually afternoons. Prior to the 2004 frequency flip, they were a Rhythmic Top 40 throughout the 1990s and most of the 2000s. The 93.7 signal was occupied by two more Top 40s before KWNZ switched signals: Rhythmic KYWD ("93.7 The Bomb") from 2003 to 2004, and from 2001 to 2003, KWNZ's current rival, Rhythmic KWYL.

KWNZ's original 97.3 frequency was KZTQ. But on August 26, 2011, KWNZ changed their call letters to KTZQ, and on August 30, 2011, flipped to variety hits as "Bob 93.7" (under new call letters KZTQ), and relaunched KWNZ's former Rhythmic format at 97.3 as "Swag 97.3" under the call letters KSGG.

On March 23, 2018, KZTQ changed callsigns to KPGF, and announced that Bob would move to KSGG on the following Monday, the 26th. At that time, 93.7 began stunting. The variety hits format and KZTQ call letters moved to AM 1270. It has since moved again to AM 1230 KZTQ.

On August 17, 2018, KPGF ended stunting and launched an 80's hits format branded as "Reno's Crazy 80s".

In July 2026, after airing various talk formats during the previous years, the station started a simulcast on KNNR 1400 AM Sparks and is now a community-focused radio station called "Northern Nevada's Voice".
