= KPVM-LD =

Television station in Las Vegas

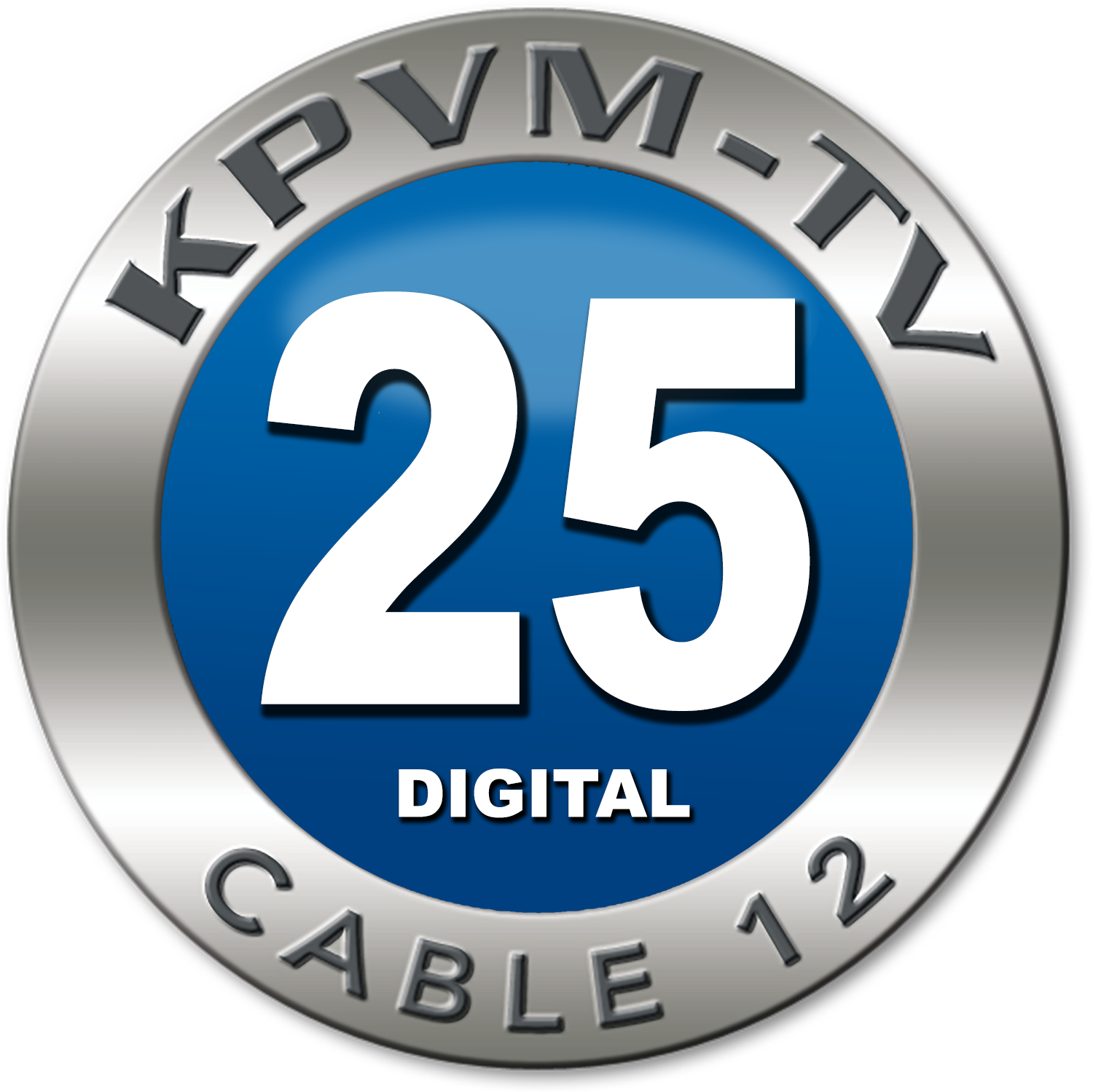
- Las Vegas, Nevada; United States
- Channels: Digital: 25 (UHF); Virtual: 25
- Branding: KPVM TV 25 / Cable 12

Programming
- Affiliations: see § Subchannels

Ownership
- Owner: Vernon Van Winkle; (KPVM Television, Inc.)

History
- Founded: November 30, 1988
- First air date: September 12, 1997
- Former call signs: K41CQ, K46KA-D
- Former channel numbers: Analog: 41 (UHF, 1997–2018); Digital: 46 (UHF, 2007–2018)
- Former affiliations: Independent (1997–1998); Pax TV/i/Ion Television (1998–2013)
- Call sign meaning: Pahrump Video Media

Technical information
- Licensing authority: FCC
- Facility ID: 168335
- Class: LD
- ERP: 15 kW
- HAAT: 551.8 m (1,810 ft)
- Transmitter coordinates: 35°56′46″N 115°2′37″W

Links
- Public license information: LMS
- Website: kpvm.tv

KPVM-LD (channel 25) is a television station in Las Vegas, Nevada, United States. Owned by Vernon Van Winkle, the station operates with an independent format (branded "Prime TV") on its main channel, along with programming from various minor networks on its other digital subchannels.

== In popular culture ==
The station and its news operation are the subject of the HBO documentary series Small Town News: KPVM Pahrump, which premiered on August 2, 2021.

== Subchannels ==
The station's signal is multiplexed:

Subchannels of KPVM-LD
| Channel | Res. | Short name | Programming |
|---|---|---|---|
| 25.1 | 720p | PrimeHD | Main KPVM-LD programming |
| 25.2 | 480i | Movies! | Movies! |
| 25.3 | 720p | RAV HD | Real America's Voice |
| 25.4 | 480i | OAN | One America Plus |
| 25.5 | 480i | NEWSMAX | Newsmax2 |
| 25.6 | 480i | Story | Story Television |
| 25.7 | 480i | AWE MP4 | AWE Plus |
| 25.8 | 480i | KACEMP4 | KACE radio |
| 25.9 | 480i | Lease | Shop LC (4:3) |
| 25.10 | 480i | Uncion | [Blank] |

Subchannel broadcast with MPEG-4 video
