= KPKK =

- Amargosa Valley, Nevada; United States
- Broadcast area: Pahrump Valley
- Frequency: 101.1 MHz

Programming
- Language: English
- Format: Classic hits

Ownership
- Owner: Sky Media, L.L.C.
- Sister stations: KAVB, KAZB

History
- First air date: August 2, 2000
- Former call signs: KPUP (2000–2003)

Technical information
- Licensing authority: FCC
- Facility ID: 87384
- Class: C2
- ERP: 26,000 watts (horizontal)
- HAAT: −25 meters (−82 ft)
- Transmitter coordinates: 36°38′26.8″N 116°23′56.1″W

Links
- Public license information: Public file; LMS
- Website: kaceradio.com

KPKK (101.1 FM) is a commercial radio station licensed to Amargosa Valley, Nevada, United States, and serving the Pahrump Valley. It is owned by Sky Media, LLC.

KPKK has an effective radiated power (ERP) of 26,000 watts, the maximum for most American FM stations but it only uses horizontal polarization. The transmitter is northwest of Pahrump, giving it a rimshot signal in Pahrump.

== History ==
The station signed on the air as KPUP on August 2, 2000. On July 22, 2003, the station changed its call sign to the current KPKK.

On February 4, 2010, KPKK went silent due to financial reasons. Even when the station resumed transmissions, financial and technical issues continued to affect the station. It went silent again on January 24, 2012, though it later resumed operations. It cited technical reasons for going silent in 2012 and 2015.
