= KOLC =

Country music radio station in Carson City, Nevada

Coordinates: 39°15′25.7″N 119°42′39.7″W

- Carson City, Nevada; United States
- Broadcast area: Reno, Nevada
- Frequency: 97.3 MHz (HD Radio)
- Branding: TEN country @ 97.3

Programming
- Format: Country
- Subchannels: HD2: The Hog (Classic rock)
- Affiliations: Compass Media Networks

Ownership
- Owner: Reno Media Group; (Americom Limited Partnership)
- Sister stations: KODS; KLCA; KBZZ; KRNO

History
- First air date: 1972 (as KPTL-FM)
- Former call signs: KRWL-FM (1968–1971, CP); KPTL-FM (1971–1974); KKBC-FM (1974–1984); KWNZ (1984–2004); KZTQ (2004–2011); KSGG (2011–2013)
- Call sign meaning: "Little City" (previous format)

Technical information
- Licensing authority: FCC
- Facility ID: 53706
- Class: C
- ERP: 87,000 watts
- HAAT: 644 meters (2,113 ft)
- Translators: HD2: 106.5 K293CA (Carson City); HD2: 92.5 K223AL (Reno)

Links
- Public license information: Public file; LMS
- Webcast: Listen live (may be restricted)
- Website: www.tencountry.com

KOLC (97.3 FM) is a commercial radio station located in Carson City, Nevada, broadcasting to the Reno, Nevada, Carson City and Lake Tahoe areas. KOLC, known as Ten Country, broadcasts a country music format. Its studios are located on Plumb Lane in South Reno, and its transmitter is located on McClellan Peak northeast of Carson City, Nevada.

== History ==
The 97.3 MHz facility in Carson City went on air in 1972 as KPTL-FM. It was owned by William Cody Kelly and two years later was transferred to the Kelly Broadcasting Company, which gave its initials to the station's next callsign, KKBC.

On August 30, 2011, KZTQ changed its call letters to KSGG and began stunting towards a new format, landing at rhythmic CHR as "Swag 97.3"; the previous KZTQ call sign moved to 93.7 FM. This marked a return to the format on this signal, as it was the original format of KWNZ during the 1990s and early 2000s prior to its own relocation to the 93.7 signal in 2004.

On March 18, 2013, KSGG began stunting, running a loop directing listeners to KSGG (1230 AM) and FM translator K285EQ 104.9 FM. On March 20, 2013, KSGG changed its call letters to KOLC. On March 25, 2013, at noon, KOLC launched a modern adult contemporary format, branded as "Little City 97.3".

On March 4, 2014, KOLC began stunting again, redirecting listeners to FM translator K223AL 92.5 FM in South Lake Tahoe (a relay of KLCA-HD3), which picked up the "Little City" modern AC format. The next day (March 5), KOLC ended stunting and launched a country music format, branded as "Ten Country @ 97.3". Rudy Michaels has been the morning show host since shortly after the transition to the country music format.
