= KDJJ =

- Fernley, Nevada; United States
- Frequency: 94.1 MHz (HD Radio)

Ownership
- Owner: Northway Broadcasting, LLC

Technical information
- Licensing authority: FCC
- Facility ID: 190451
- Class: C1
- ERP: 45,000 watts
- HAAT: 296 metres (971 ft)
- Transmitter coordinates: 39°54′46.2″N 118°55′18.9″W

Links
- Public license information: Public file; LMS

KDJJ (94.1 FM) is a radio station licensed to serve the community of Fernley, Nevada. The station is owned by Northway Broadcasting, LLC.

The station was assigned the KDJJ call letters by the Federal Communications Commission on September 9, 2016.
