= KBZZ (AM) =

Radio station in Reno, Nevada

- Reno, Nevada; United States
- Broadcast area: Reno–Sparks metropolitan area
- Frequency: 1230 kHz
- Branding: 96.1 The Zone

Programming
- Format: Alternative rock
- Affiliations: Premiere Networks

Ownership
- Owner: Reno Media Group; (Americom Limited Partnership)
- Sister stations: KODS; KLCA; KOLC; KRNO

History
- First air date: 1947 (as KWRN at 1490)
- Former call signs: KWRN (1947–1957); KDOT (1957–1963); KCBN (1963–1989); KRNO (1989–1990); KCBN (1990–2001); KPLY (2001–2005); KJFK (2005–2013); KSGG (2013–2018); KBZZ (2018–2019); KZTQ (2019–2025)
- Former frequencies: 1490 kHz (1947–1963)
- Call sign meaning: "Buzz", former branding of 1270 AM

Technical information
- Licensing authority: FCC
- Facility ID: 202
- Class: C
- Power: 1,000 watts; 250 watts (translator)
- Transmitter coordinates: 39°30′50″N 119°42′54″W
- Translator: See § FM translators

Links
- Public license information: Public file; LMS
- Website: thezone961.com

KBZZ (1230 kHz) is a commercial AM radio station licensed to Reno, Nevada. The station is owned by Americom Limited Partnership. KBZZ airs an alternative rock format known as "96.1 The Zone", after its translator in Reno on 96.1 FM.

The station's studios are located on Matley Lane in East Reno, and its transmitter is located near Veterans Parkway in Reno, just south of the Truckee River and the Sparks city limits.

== History ==
The station signed on the air in 1947 with 250 watts using call sign KWRN. It was initially owned by Reno Newspapers, Incorporated and broadcast on 1490 kHz as an ABC affiliate. This station was acquired by Kenyon Brown in 1950; Brown moved it to 1230 kHz two years later. Upon Radioreno's acquisition of KWRN in 1957, KWRN became KDOT, and on August 14, 1963, the station became KCBN, returning to the air October 30 of that year after being silent for nearly a year. The KCBN call sign remained in place for most of the next 50 years.

The station announced as of March 18, 2013, it would switch from progressive talk to urban contemporary, branded as "Swag 104.9" and changed its call sign to KSGG.

On March 24, 2014, KSGG changed its format to sports, with programming from Yahoo! Sports Radio.

On March 24, 2015, KSGG flipped to a country format as "96.9 the Rodeo", with an FM translator on 96.9 MHz, with a focus on 1990s country songs.

On October 1, 2016, KSGG changed its format to classic hip hop, branded as "Power 96.9 & 1230".

On March 15, 2018, KSGG swapped call signs with sister station KBZZ (1270 AM). KBZZ was the former Reno affiliate of the San Francisco Giants Radio Network. Station ownership made the decision to discontinue Giants broadcasts beginning with the 2019 season.

On September 13, 2019, KBZZ and KZTQ exchanged call signs, formats, and associated translators: Bob FM and the KZTQ call sign moved to 1230 AM but kept its 96.1 and 96.9 FM translators, while 92.5 FM (nominally a repeater of KRNO HD2) flipped to sports talk as "92.5 The Game", also heard on 1270 AM, which regained the KBZZ call sign.

On February 10, 2023, KZTQ changed its format from adult hits to alternative rock, branded as "96.1 The Zone". KZTQ and KBZZ again swapped call signs on March 24, 2025.

== FM translator ==
The 96.1 in the KBZZ branding originates with the FM translator frequency.

Broadcast translator for KBZZ
Call sign	Frequency	City of license	FID	ERP (W)	Class	FCC info
K241AK	96.1 FM	Reno, Nevada	87691	250	D	LMS
