= Oakland Raiders relocation to Las Vegas =

NFL franchise relocation

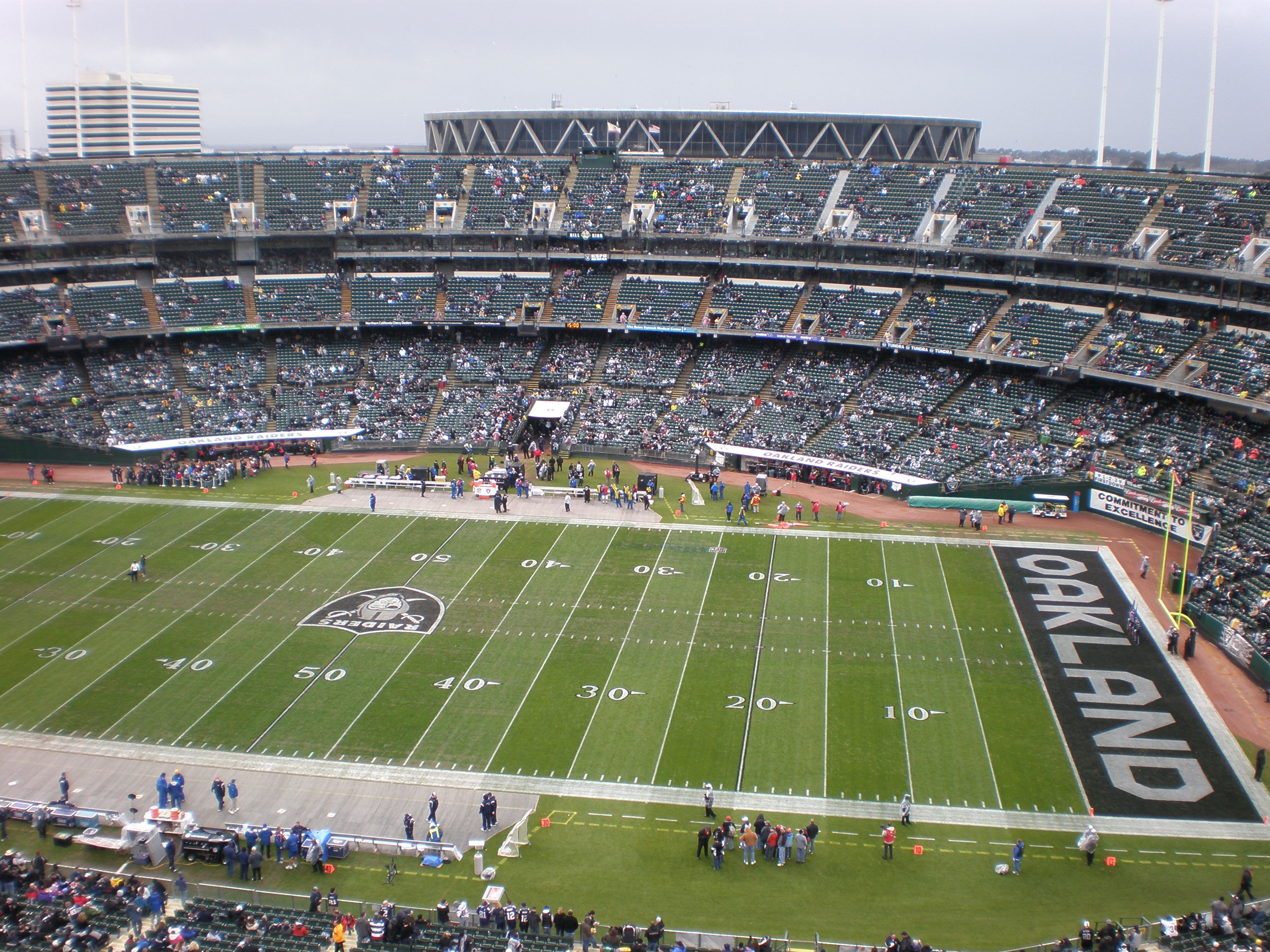
Oakland Coliseum (pictured in 2008) before a football game.

On January 22, 2020, the Oakland Raiders, an American football team that competed in the National Football League (NFL), moved from its original city of Oakland, California, to the Las Vegas metropolitan area. The team began play as the Las Vegas Raiders in the 2020 NFL season. The Raiders were the third NFL team to move from one metropolitan area to another in the 2010s.

Raiders owner Mark Davis decided to move the team after years of failed efforts to renovate or replace the Oakland Coliseum, long rated one of the worst NFL stadiums. NFL team owners approved the move, 31–1, at their annual meeting in Phoenix, Arizona, on March 27, 2017.

The Raiders became the third NFL franchise to move in the 2010s, after the Rams' 2016 return to Los Angeles, California, from St. Louis, Missouri, and the Chargers' 2017 return from San Diego to Los Angeles. The Raiders were the second professional sports franchise to represent Las Vegas, after the Vegas Golden Knights, created in 2017 by the National Hockey League.

== Background ==
The Oakland Raiders were founded as a charter member of the American Football League (AFL) in 1960. The team joined the NFL as a result of the merger in 1970. From 1966 until 1981, it played home games at the Oakland Coliseum, which it shared with Major League Baseball's Oakland Athletics after that team moved to Oakland from Kansas City, Missouri in 1968. In 1980 Al Davis, dissatisfied with the stadium situation in Oakland and seeing luxury suites as the future of the NFL, came to an agreement with the Los Angeles Memorial Coliseum Commission to move the Raiders to Los Angeles. The NFL had refused to let the team move, but a court overruled the league, clearing the way for the Raiders to move to Los Angeles and become the Los Angeles Raiders in 1982. The Raiders played home games at the Los Angeles Memorial Coliseum from 1982 to 1994. In 1995, the Raiders returned to Oakland after the city and Alameda County agreed to build the luxury and club seats on to the Oakland Coliseum with a structure that would become known as Mount Davis. Davis chose to return the Raiders to Oakland after the Los Angeles Memorial Coliseum Commission failed to deliver on promised renovations to build luxury suites (the Coliseum would not have luxury suites until a 2019 renovation), and after he was unable to secure a new stadium in the Los Angeles area that met his conditions (plans to build new stadiums in Irwindale and in Inglewood at the future site of SoFi Stadium in the late 1980s and early 1990s respectively collapsed). At one point a proposed move to Sacramento that involved Davis taking ownership of the Sacramento Kings, looked possible but that deal fell apart.

Las Vegas had been home to a number of other professional football franchises between 1994 and the Raiders' arrival, none of which were particularly successful. The Las Vegas Posse, part of the Canadian Football League's effort to enter the U.S. market, lasted one season in 1994 and suffered from a poor on-field product and low attendance. The XFL included the Las Vegas Outlaws in its lone 2001 season. Attendance and on-field performance were respectable, and the team embraced the city's culture, but the Outlaws' modest success was overshadowed by the failure of the XFL. The Las Vegas Locomotives of the United Football League were a major on-field success and were one of the UFL's best teams; it nonetheless suffered from poor attendance that continued to decline throughout the league's existence to the point that its last home game drew only 600 fans. The Arena Football League included three teams in Las Vegas over the course of its history: the Las Vegas Sting (1994 and 1995), Las Vegas Gladiators (2003 to 2007, who moved to Cleveland and became the Cleveland Gladiators before folding), and another Las Vegas Outlaws (2015). The Las Vegas Sin of the Lingerie Football League (now the Extreme Football League) played in the city from 2011 to 2014.

== The hunt for a home ==
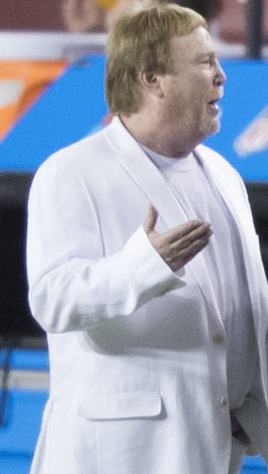
Raiders owner Mark Davis

Recent efforts to either renovate the Oakland–Alameda County Coliseum or replace it with a new football stadium in Oakland or elsewhere began on November 18, 2009. In 2011, Al Davis died; control of the team was assumed by his son Mark Davis who made the three-decade stadium problem a top priority. The Raiders were free to move after the 2013 NFL season, when its lease at the Oakland–Alameda County Coliseum expired. While exploring possible solutions in the Bay Area and elsewhere, the Raiders signed one-year extensions of its lease on the Coliseum.

=== 2011: Levi's Stadium ===
The Raiders were talking with the San Francisco 49ers about sharing the planned Levi's Stadium in Santa Clara, California. However, the 49ers went ahead without the Raiders and broke ground on the $1.2 billion stadium on April 19, 2012, and afterwards sold $670 million worth of seats including 70% of club and luxury suites, making it more unlikely that the Raiders would want to explore any idea of sharing the stadium as they would then be secondary tenants with few to no commercial rights over the highly lucrative luxury suites.

In October 2012, Mark Davis told NFL Network reporter Ian Rapoport that he had no plans to share the stadium but that he did recognize the Raiders' need for a new home and that he hoped the new home would be in Oakland. When Levi's Stadium opened on July 17, 2014, NFL Commissioner Roger Goodell mentioned to the live crowd that it would make a great home for the Raiders and that the team had to decide whether or not it wanted to play there or build a stadium on the site of the Oakland–Alameda County Coliseum.

=== 2012–2013: Coliseum City ===
On March 7, 2012, then-Mayor Jean Quan unveiled an ambitious project to the media that was designed to improve the sports facilities of all three major league sports teams in the city (the Raiders, the Oakland Athletics, and the Golden State Warriors), as well as attract new businesses to the city. The project, dubbed Coliseum City, had entailed the redevelopment of the existing Oakland–Alameda County Coliseum complex. The redevelopment would have seen the construction of two new stadiums on the present location, a baseball-only stadium and a football-only stadium, while Oracle Arena, home of the Warriors, would have been either rebuilt or undergone extensive renovations. A sum of $3.5 million was committed to preliminary planning on the project. However, no officials from either of Oakland's major league teams were present at the media conference.

According to the San Francisco Business Times, Oakland's assistant city administrator Fred Blackwell said the Bay Investment Group LLC, an entity formed by Colony Capital LLC, Rashid Al Malik (chairman and CEO of HayaH Holdings), and the city, had numerous details to continue working out for the prospective $2 billion Coliseum City project, which covered 800 acres surrounding the Oakland–Alameda Coliseum Complex. The development team also included JRDV Urban International, HKS Architects, and Forest City Real Estate Services. In an ideal situation, construction could have started by the end of 2014. Meanwhile, the Warriors began to go forward with plans to build a new arena at Mission Bay, not far from Oracle Park, and move across the Bay from Oakland to San Francisco in 2019. The Athletics were also seeking a new ballpark to replace the Coliseum, and were at the time looking at a site in San Jose.

In April 2014, after funding was thought to have dried up for the project, Quan gave an interview to KGMZ-FM where she announced that developers working on Coliseum City "are partnered literally with the prince of Dubai, who is next in line to lead Dubai. And they have capital."' The statement was immediately walked back by her spokesperson who said no actual partnership was in place.

=== 2013: Concord, California ===
The abandoned Concord Naval Weapons Station, 26.6 miles from Oakland, was announced in 2013 as a possible location for a new stadium but developments failed to materialize.

=== 2014: San Antonio, Texas ===
In July 2014, San Antonio, Texas, emerged as a potential destination for the team, after Raiders owner Mark Davis visited the city for the induction of former Raiders wide receiver Cliff Branch into a local hall of fame. San Antonio, while a smaller media market than the San Francisco Bay Area, had a relatively new and NFL-ready stadium in the Alamodome, and less sporting competition. On July 29, 2014, the San Antonio Express-News reported that Mark Davis met with San Antonio government officials to discuss a move after the 2014–15 NFL season. The Raiders would have played at the 65,000-seat Alamodome until a new stadium could be built. San Antonio remained in contention through at least November 2014, when Raiders staffers scouted the stadium and began negotiating with city officials. In December 2018, Davis said that his main concern with the Alamodome was the stadium's artificial turf.

=== 2015: Raiders attempt to put together a project with Athletics ===
It was reported in early 2015 that the Raiders met with Athletics owner Lewis Wolff in an effort to create a stadium solution where two separate stadiums (one for the Raiders and one for the Athletics) would have been built on the coliseum site. The Athletics balked at the deal. In an interview with J. T. the Brick on KGMZ on April 4, 2017, Davis revealed that he offered Wolff 20% of the Raiders in an attempt to get a deal done. Davis further elaborated that the closest the Raiders came to a deal in Oakland was in 2013 with Colony Capital, before the Athletics agreed to a 10-year lease extension at the Coliseum with the city of Oakland.

=== 2015: Los Angeles project and losing to the Rams ===
On February 19, 2015, the Raiders and the then San Diego Chargers announced that they would build a privately financed $1.78 billion stadium in Carson, California if they were to move back to the Los Angeles market. Both teams stated that they would continue to attempt to get stadiums built in their respective cities. The Carson City Council bypassed a public vote and approved the plan 3–0. The council voted without having clarified several issues, including who would finance the stadium, how the required three-way land swap would be performed, and how it would raise enough revenue if only one team moved in as tenant.

On January 12, 2016, the NFL rejected the Raiders' request to move in favor of a competing plan by Stan Kroenke to move the St. Louis Rams back to Los Angeles and construct a stadium and entertainment district in Inglewood, California. However, the NFL left open the possibility of the Raiders moving to Los Angeles by 2020 and playing in the new stadium under construction to house the Los Angeles Rams. The San Diego Chargers had the first option to join the Rams at the new stadium. The Raiders would have been authorized to negotiate an agreement if the Chargers did not exercise their option by January 2017. The Chargers exercised their choice and announced their move to Los Angeles in January 2017, shutting the Raiders out of the Southern California market.

Around this time other markets expressed interest in luring the Raiders. Duluth, Minnesota, proposed to build a stadium for the team, a proposal that was not taken seriously because of the metro area's small size, proximity to the Minnesota Vikings, and unwillingness to commit money to the stadium proposal.

== 2015–2017: Negotiations to move to Las Vegas and last Oakland stadium effort ==
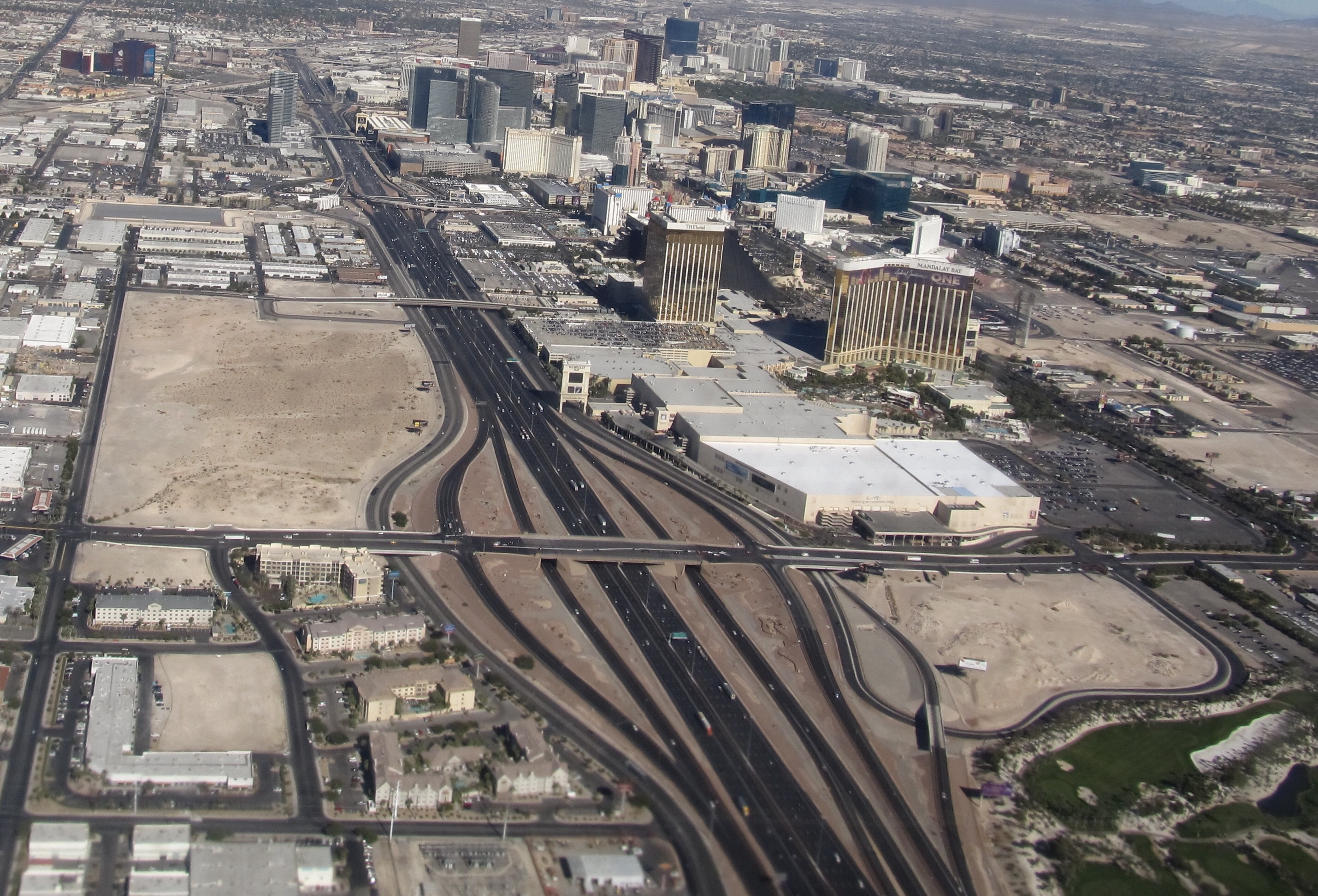
2015 view of the Allegiant Stadium site, next to Mandalay Bay and Interstate 15

=== 2015: Exploring Las Vegas ===
Al Davis often visited Las Vegas and sometimes considered moving the Raiders to the city. The first professional football game ever played in the Las Vegas area was a Raiders preseason game against the Houston Oilers in 1964 at the original Cashman Field. Mark Davis purchased LasVegasRaiders.com in 1998 and renewed the domain registration each year. On February 23, 2015, while still involved in the Carson project, Mark Davis attended a secret meeting at the University of Nevada, Las Vegas (UNLV) International Gaming Research Center to look at Las Vegas sports betting, its effect on pro sports, how it could affect a pro sports team in Vegas and how the Raiders and the NFL could possibly work in Las Vegas. At the time Las Vegas was seen as a long-shot candidate to win the Raiders. The meeting was set up by Napoleon McCallum, a former Raiders player turned Las Vegas Sands employee. McCallum approached Davis about moving the team to Las Vegas before a Broncos-Raiders game on November 9, 2014, in Oakland. McCallum was the first to suggest a meeting with UNLV about the idea. Previously, Las Vegas officials, notably Mayor Carolyn Goodman, had suggested building a stadium near Las Vegas Motor Speedway. At the meeting were Davis and McCallum, along with then-UNLV president Don Snyder and Bo Bernhard, executive director of the International Gaming Institute. The meeting would not be publicly revealed until two years later.

While the Raiders were looking for a stadium solution, UNLV had been looking for a way to build a new stadium to replace the aging and outdated Sam Boyd Stadium since 2011. However, the university was having issues with coming up with the funds to build a stadium and the political will for helping fund a stadium for UNLV with public money was not there. By the beginning of 2016, the possibility was floated of building a stadium to house both the Raiders and UNLV.

=== 2016 ===
On January 29, 2016, Davis met with Las Vegas Sands owner Sheldon Adelson about moving to a $2.3 billion, 65,000-capacity domed stadium in Las Vegas. Davis also visited UNLV to meet with the university's president Len Jessup, former university president Donald Snyder, Steve Wynn, and former Ultimate Fighting Championship (UFC) owner Lorenzo Fertitta. The proposed stadium would replace Sam Boyd Stadium and would serve as the home of both the Raiders and the UNLV Rebels. Raiders officials visited Las Vegas to tour locations in the valley for a potential new home.

Interviewed by sports columnist Tim Kawakami of the San Jose Mercury News, Davis said that he had a "great" visit in the city. Davis also said that Las Vegas was a global city and that "it's absolutely an NFL city," as well as saying that "the Raider brand would do well" and "I think Las Vegas is coming along slowly."

On March 21, 2016, Davis said, "I think the Raiders like the Las Vegas plan," and "it's a very very very intriguing and exciting plan". Davis also met with Nevada Governor Brian Sandoval about the stadium plan. On April 1, 2016, Davis toured Sam Boyd Stadium to evaluate whether UNLV could serve as a temporary home of the team. He talked with UNLV football coach Tony Sanchez, athletic director Tina Kunzer-Murphy, adviser Don Snyder and school president Len Jessup.

On April 28, 2016, Davis said he wanted to move the Raiders to Las Vegas and he pledged $500 million toward the construction of a proposed $2.4 billion domed stadium. "Together we can turn the Silver State into the silver and black state," Davis said.

At a media conference in UNLV's Stan Fulton Building, Davis also said the club had "made a commitment to Las Vegas at this point in time and that's where it stands." In an interview with ESPN after returning from a meeting for the 2016 NFL draft he explained why southern Nevada might be a better location than the East Bay of the Oakland–San Francisco Bay Area and how he tried to make it work in Oakland; he also spoke of the meeting saying, "It was a positive, well-organized presentation that I believe was well-received", and said, "It was a very positive step in finding the Raiders a home."

On May 20, 2016, New England Patriots owner Robert Kraft said he would support Davis and the Raiders' move to Las Vegas: "I think it would be good for the NFL."

On May 23, 2016, the San Francisco Chronicle and other media outlets reported that a group led by former San Francisco 49ers safety (and Pro Football Hall of Fame member) Ronnie Lott and former quarterback Rodney Peete were looking into building a new Oakland stadium for the Raiders. The group met with team executives and Oakland city officials to brief them on their proposal. They also met with mayor Libby Schaaf. The Alameda County Board of Supervisors voted to begin negotiations with Lott's group and with the city of Oakland regarding the "price and terms of sale" for the 120-acre land of the Oakland Coliseum and Oracle Arena.

NFL.com's Judy Battista reported from the NFL spring league meeting in Charlotte, North Carolina on May 24, 2016 that Davis planned to move the Raiders from Oakland to Las Vegas if Las Vegas & Clark County government officials, as well as wealthy businessmen, could come up with a suitable stadium proposal. At the spring league meeting, Davis, speaking about Las Vegas, was quoted to have said "It seems like a neutral site" [between the Bay Area and Southern California], adding, "[Las Vegas] could unite Raider Nation and not divide it. It's not giving up on something else. I would like to give somebody the opportunity to get something done."

Davis publicly reiterated his commitment to his announced plans to move the Raiders franchise to Las Vegas with the support of the state of Nevada and casino mogul Sheldon Adelson, and said he did not want to negotiate further with Oakland while the Las Vegas deal was still actively in progress. A move to Las Vegas required approval by a three-quarters majority of NFL owners, and NFL commissioner Roger Goodell publicly stated his preference for keeping the Raiders franchise in Oakland if at all possible. However, it was reported that the NFL looked unfavorably on the Lott Group's financier Fortress Investment Group, known for defaulting on promises and backing patent trolls.

On August 11, 2016, Raiders' officials met with northern Nevada officials about the possibility of Reno being the site of a new training camp/practice facility, and they toured several sites including the University of Nevada, Reno, Reno area high schools, and sports complexes. On August 25, 2016, the Raiders filed a trademark application for "Las Vegas Raiders" on the same day renderings of a new stadium (located west of Interstate 15 in Las Vegas) were released to the public.

On September 15, 2016, the Southern Nevada Tourism Infrastructure Committee unanimously voted to recommend and approve $750 million for the Las Vegas stadium plan.

On October 11, 2016, the Nevada Senate voted 16–5 to approve the funding bill for the Las Vegas stadium proposal. The Nevada Assembly voted 28–13 three days later to approve the bill to fund the new Las Vegas stadium proposal; two days later, Governor Brian Sandoval signed the funding bill into law.

Davis told ESPN on October 15, 2016, that even if the Raiders were approved by the league to move to the Las Vegas metropolitan area, the club would play the next two seasons at the Oakland–Alameda County Coliseum in 2017 and 2018: "We want to bring a Super Bowl championship back to the Bay Area." The team would then play at a temporary facility in 2019 after its lease at the Coliseum expired. Davis also indicated a desire to play at least one preseason game in Las Vegas, at Sam Boyd Stadium, as early as the 2018 season. This would fail to materalize and all home preseason games until 2020 would be played in Oakland.

On October 17, 2016, Nevada Governor Brian Sandoval signed into law Senate Bill 1 and Assembly Bill 1 which approved a hotel room tax rate increase to accommodate $750 million in public funding for the new stadium.

On November 12, 2016, a report from the NFL's in-house media team said Las Vegas might not be a done deal. The report said that most owners preferred the Raiders to stay in Oakland due to market size and stability. The vast majority of the NFL's revenue comes from TV contracts. So it made little sense for the other 31 NFL owners to allow one of their partners to leave the country's 6th-biggest media market for its 42nd even if the market was also home to another partner in the 49ers.

On November 30, 2016, a framework deal to keep the Raiders in Oakland was announced. In addition to the public land, the city of Oakland would commit $200 million to improve the infrastructure of the surrounding area. The Raiders would contribute $500 million to the stadium, while Lott's group would contribute $400 million; the NFL already committed $300 million when it rejected the Raiders' bid to return to Los Angeles in 2015. Ronnie Lott had no financial or ownership stake in the Raiders; some sources indicated that Lott was also asking for an ownership stake (reportedly around 20%) in the Raiders franchise as part of the deal, a condition that was unacceptable to Raiders owner Mark Davis.

The Oakland proposal was officially announced in December 2016, and called for a $1.3 billion, football-only stadium built on the existing Coliseum site. It included mixed use development for possible office or retail space, hotel or residential living and parking, as well as 15 acres set aside for a new baseball-only facility for the Oakland Athletics if the A's so desired. The site also could have been expanded to include the land Oracle Arena sits on, with the Warriors cleared to move to their new San Francisco arena by the 2019 season.

The Ronnie Lott proposal was voted on by the Oakland city and Alameda County elected officials on December 13, 2016 and approved by Oakland in a 7–0 vote and by Alameda County in a 3–2 vote.

=== 2017 ===
The Raiders officially filed paperwork to move to Las Vegas on January 19, 2017. The Raiders needed 24 of the 32 NFL club owners to vote to officially approve the move to Las Vegas.

On January 30, 2017, it was announced that Adelson had dropped out of the stadium project, also withdrawing the Las Vegas Sands' proposed $650 million contribution from the project. Instead, the Raiders would increase their contribution from $500 million to $1.15 billion. One day after Adelson's announcement, Goldman Sachs (the company behind the financing to the proposed Las Vegas stadium) announced its intent to withdraw from the project.

On January 31, 2017, in the aftermath of Adelson and Goldman Sachs' withdrawal from the Las Vegas deal, the San Diego Union-Tribune reported that San Diego mayor Kevin Faulconer reached out to an NFL official to let them know they were eager to engage; a city official also spoke to a Raiders official on the phone. The Union-Tribune noted that any possible Raiders move to San Diego or bringing a team to the city would have been aided by a proposal for a soccer-specific stadium and mixed development. NFL commissioner Roger Goodell reiterated, during his State of the NFL address, that San Diego would need a new stadium in order to draw the team. Another roadblock for a Raiders move to the city would have been the owners of the current Los Angeles teams. Stan Kroenke and Dean Spanos would block any team from sharing Southern California, especially if that team is the Raiders (given the team's continued popularity in the region). San Diego, as an option for the Raiders, was remote.

San Diego was previously home to the San Diego Chargers from 1961 until 2016 (when the team moved to the Greater Los Angeles Area); a Raiders move there would have been ironic given that the team's primary rival the Chargers were based in that city. On February 16, 2017, the San Diego Union-Tribune obtained a letter from Doug Manchester that stated he had "assembled a powerful group of associates" who would develop a 70,000-seat stadium on the land of SDCCU Stadium; the letter also stated the project would provide "a viable alternative" to the Raiders in case Las Vegas fell through; the group also stated that they were "open to working with the Chargers, Raiders, other NFL owners, or a new ownership group"; it also stated an NFL franchise could participate as a partner or tenant: "Our group will provide the funds previously allocated to be provided by the City of San Diego and guarantee the stadium's expeditious construction. Accordingly it will not require voter approval." It also said they would provide "new state of the art scoreboards and upgrade Qualcomm Stadium while the new stadium is being constructed". On March 1, 2017, Fortress Investment Group submitted a tweaked version of the Oakland stadium plan to the NFL.

== Move to Las Vegas ==
On March 6, 2017, the Raiders revealed that Bank of America would replace Sheldon Adelson's portion of the funding for the new stadium in Las Vegas. On March 27, 2017, the National Football League approved the Raiders' move from Oakland to Las Vegas in a 31–1 vote; the Miami Dolphins were the only team to vote against the measure. The NFL issued a press release on April 14, 2017, outlining why the league's owners approved the Raiders' move from Oakland. About one thousand season ticket holders asked for and received refunds after the move to Las Vegas was announced. Their tickets were sold to other fans within hours, and the Raiders' 53,250 season tickets were all sold out by late May.

On November 13, 2017, the Raiders broke ground on what was at the time tentatively called Las Vegas Stadium.

The club subsequently played the 2017, 2018 and 2019 NFL seasons at the Oakland–Alameda County Coliseum as the Oakland Raiders. The team moved to the new stadium in 2020.

The league levied a $350 million relocation fee on the Raiders, which paid it in ten annual installments beginning in 2019. This figure was slightly more than half of the $650 million fee that the Rams and Chargers each paid to move to Los Angeles.

=== 2018 ===
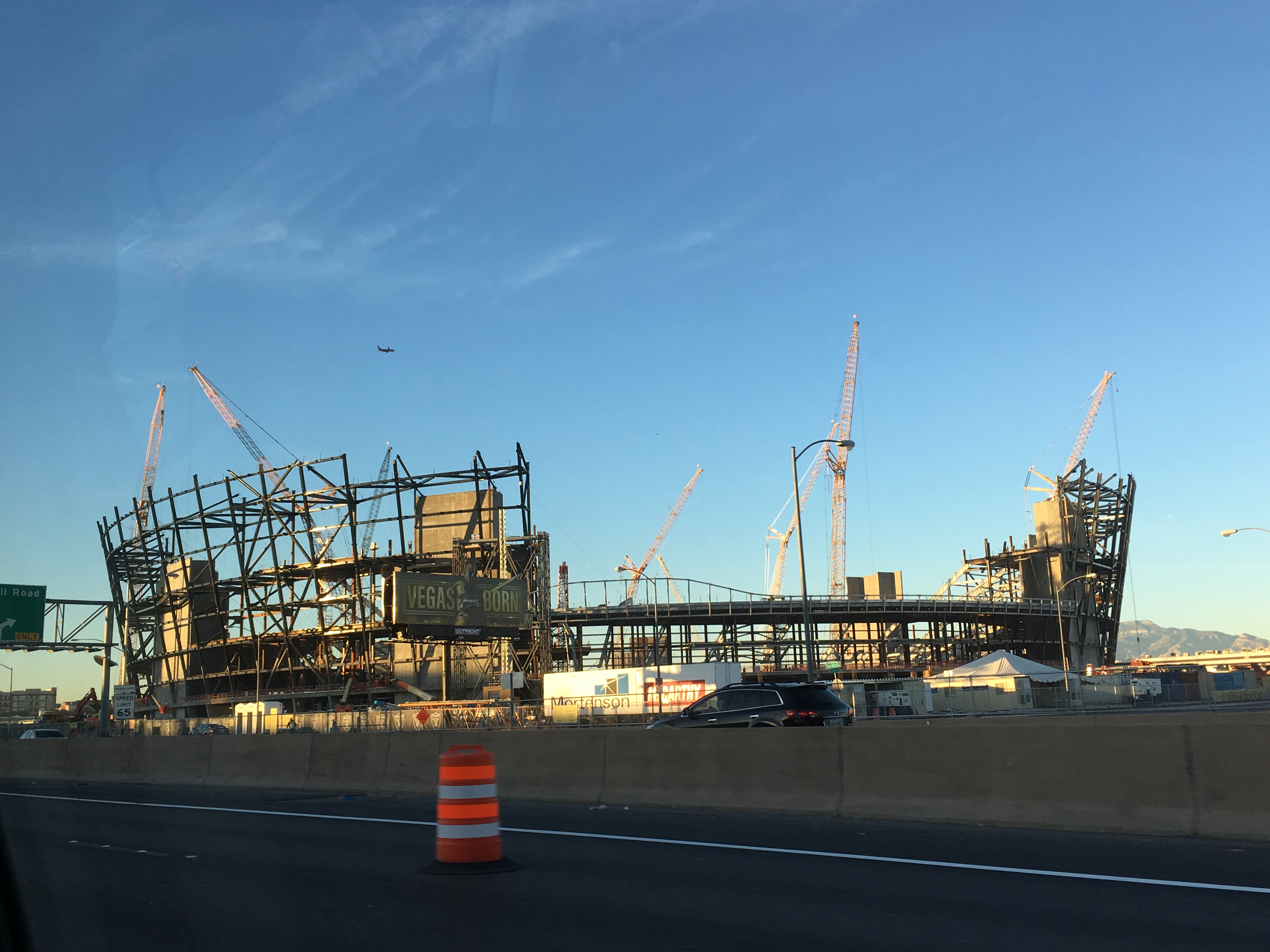
Allegiant Stadium in December 2018

On January 2, 2018, the Henderson city council approved the sale of 55 vacant acres of land to the Raiders for their new headquarters and practice facility near Henderson Executive Airport. In January, construction crews began blasting caliche rock with dynamite to excavate and create the stadium bowl. By April 2018, more than 30 Raiders employees had already moved to Las Vegas from Oakland.

On December 12, 2018, NFL Commissioner Roger Goodell announced that Las Vegas would host the 2020 NFL draft, solidifying the NFL's support for the move, stating: "We look forward to working with the Raiders, Las Vegas officials and the Las Vegas Convention and Visitors Authority to create an unforgettable week-long celebration of football for our fans, the incoming prospects and partners." However, the draft was eventually held only via videoconferencing in response to the COVID-19 pandemic. During the 2020 draft, Goodell announced that Las Vegas would instead host the draft in 2022.

=== 2019 ===
On December 11, 2018, the city of Oakland filed an antitrust lawsuit against the Raiders and, individually, all 31 other teams in the NFL seeking millions of dollars in financial damages and unpaid debts on the Coliseum; the suit did not seek an injunction forcing the team to stay. On May 1, 2020, the suit was dismissed. In February 2019, it was reported that the Raiders were negotiating with Oracle Park in San Francisco, home of Major League Baseball's San Francisco Giants to host the Raiders for the 2019 season, but the San Francisco 49ers reportedly vetoed the deal using their territorial rights. The Raiders then, with admitted reluctance, resumed negotiations with the Coliseum and announced a renewal with that venue on February 25; the agreement, which ran for one or two years depending on whether the Allegiant Stadium was ready for play in 2020, required approval from the city of Oakland and the NFL. The Oakland–Alameda County Coliseum Authority, the Alameda County Board of Supervisors and Oakland City Council all voted to approve the lease by March 21, clearing all legal hurdles in time for the NFL's owners meetings on March 24.

=== 2020 ===
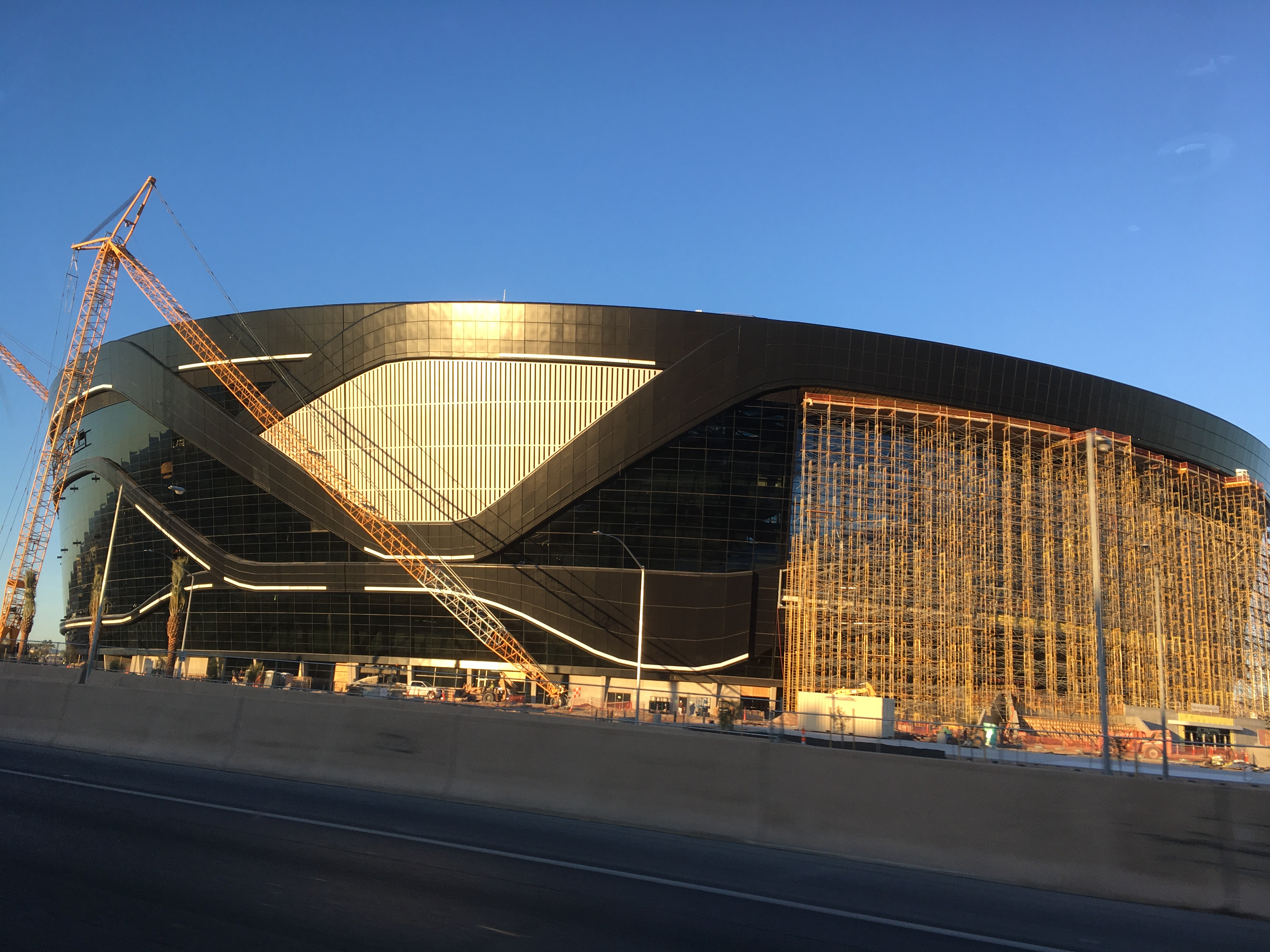
Allegiant Stadium in March 2020

On January 9, 2020, the Raiders changed their social media handles from "Oakland Raiders" to "The Raiders".

On January 22, 2020, the team was officially declared the "Las Vegas Raiders" in a ceremony at Allegiant Stadium.

In February 2020, the Raiders sold their under-construction headquarters in Henderson, Nevada, to Mesirow Financial for $191 million in a sale-and-leaseback. As part of the sale, the Raiders signed a 29-year lease on the headquarters, with options to extend at the end of the lease for ten-year terms up to a total of 99 years. The new headquarters, called the Intermountain Healthcare Performance Center, opened in June 2020 and is part of a complex that also includes a studio for the Las Vegas Raiderettes and a headquarters and practice facility for the WNBA's Las Vegas Aces which were purchased by Davis in 2021.

Allegiant Stadium met its substantial completion deadline on July 31, 2020. The team held its first closed-door practice in the stadium on August 21 during the COVID-19 pandemic.

The team won its first game as the Las Vegas Raiders on September 13, 2020, defeating the Carolina Panthers, 34–30; they won their first home game in their new venue eight days later, defeating the New Orleans Saints, 34–24.

== See also ==
- Oakland Athletics relocation to Las Vegas
- Baltimore Colts relocation to Indianapolis
- Cleveland Browns relocation controversy
- National Football League controversies
- National Football League franchise moves and mergers
- Relocation of professional sports teams
- Sports in the Las Vegas metropolitan area
