= University of Nevada, Las Vegas =

Public university in Paradise, Nevada, US

Coordinates: 36.10779°N 115.14376°W

- Former names: University of Nevada, Southern Division (1957–1965); Nevada Southern University (1965–1969)
- Motto: Omnia Pro Patria (Latin)
- Motto in English: "All For Our Country"
- Type: Public land-grant (Note: The passage of SB287 in May 2021 by the Nevada State Legislature confirms that UNLV is considered a land-grant university.) research university
- Established: September 10, 1957; 68 years ago
- Parent institution: Nevada System of Higher Education
- Accreditation: NWCCU
- Academic affiliations: CUMU; space-grant
- Endowment: $470.85 million (2025)
- President: Christopher L. Heavey (interim)
- Faculty: 1,000
- Administrative staff: 3,282
- Students: 31,142 (2020)
- Undergraduates: 25,795 (fall 2023)
- Postgraduates: 4,282 (fall 2023)
- Doctoral students: 4,043 (fall 2020)
- Location: Paradise, Nevada (Las Vegas postal address), United States
- Campus: Midsize city Main campus: 358 acres (145 ha) North campus: 640 acres (260 ha) Shadow Lane campus: 18.2 acres (7.4 ha)
- Other campuses: Las Vegas
- Newspaper: The Scarlet & Gray
- Colors: Scarlet and gray
- Nicknames: Rebels; Runnin' Rebels; Lady Rebels
- Sporting affiliations: NCAA Division I FBS – Mountain West
- Website: unlv.edu

The University of Nevada, Las Vegas (UNLV) is a public land-grant research university in Paradise, Nevada, United States. The 332-acre (134 ha) campus is about 1.6 mi (2.6 km) east of the Las Vegas Strip. It was formerly part of the University of Nevada from 1957 to 1969. It includes the Shadow Lane Campus, just east of the University Medical Center of Southern Nevada, which houses the School of Medicine and School of Dental Medicine. UNLV's law school, the William S. Boyd School of Law, is the only law school in the state.

It is classified among "R1: Doctoral Universities – Very high research activity". According to the National Science Foundation, UNLV spent $83 million on research and development in 2018, ranking it 165th in the nation.

== History ==
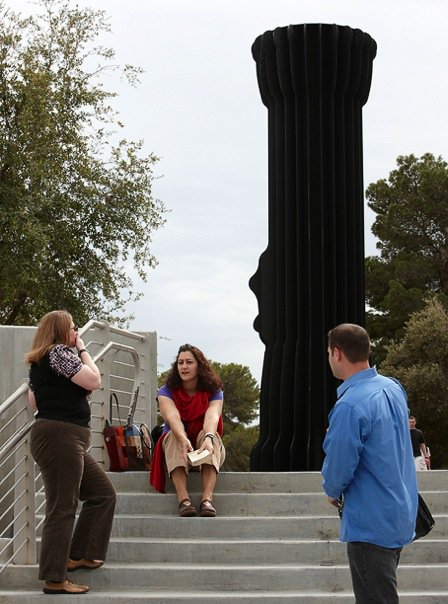
The Flashlight by Claes Oldenburg stands 38 ft tall and symbolizes UNLV as a "Beacon of Knowledge" in southern Nevada.

=== Beginnings ===
The first college classes, which eventually became the classes of UNLV, were offered as the southern regional extension division of the University of Nevada in 1959 in a classroom at Las Vegas High School. In 1955, State Senator Mahlon Brown "sponsored the legislation to provide $200,000 to construct the campus's first building" – Frazier Hall. Groundbreaking on the original 60-acre (24 ha) site was in April 1956, and the university purchased a 640-acre (260 ha) site in North Las Vegas for future expansion. UNLV was officially founded by the Nevada Board of Regents as the Southern Division of the University of Nevada on September 10, 1957. The first classes were held on the current campus in the post and beam Mid Century Modern Maude Frazier Hall designed by the local architectural firm, Zick & Sharp. Twenty-nine students graduated in the first commencement ceremonies in 1964.

=== Nevada Southern University ===
In 1965, the Nevada Legislature named the school Nevada Southern University, and the Board of Regents hired the campus's first president, Donald C. Moyer, who died in 2008 at the age of 88.

In 1968, Nevada Southern was given equal status with its parent institution in Reno, and the present name was approved by the regents in January 1969, during a winter session and without the need for input from representatives from the University of Nevada, Reno. During this time, Nevada Southern University also adopted the southern "Rebel" athletics moniker and a mascot dressed in a southern Confederate uniform named Beauregard. The popular reasoning behind such a controversial moniker and mascot is that they did it to oppose the northern Union traditions and symbols of their northern rival, the University of Nevada. Soon, protests from NSU/UNLV students forced a slight change to their Confederate mascot, but the "Rebels" moniker remains to this day. Since its founding, the university has grown rapidly, expanding both its academic programs and campus facilities.

=== Evolution to UNLV ===
In 1969, the board of regents approved the name University of Nevada, Las Vegas, and the abbreviation UNLV.

In 1973, Jerry Tarkanian was hired as the men's basketball coach by UNLV's second president, Roman Zorn.

The Center for Business and Economic Research was established in 1975 for research projects that assist in developing the Nevada economy and assist state and local agencies and private-sector enterprises in collecting and analyzing economic and market data.

In 1981, Claes Oldenburg's Flashlight sculpture was installed on the plaza between Artemus Ham Hall and Judy Bayley Theatre.

The Lied Institute for Real Estate Studies was established in 1989.

In 2001, Lied Library opened to the public. The final cost of the project was reported to be $55.3 million.

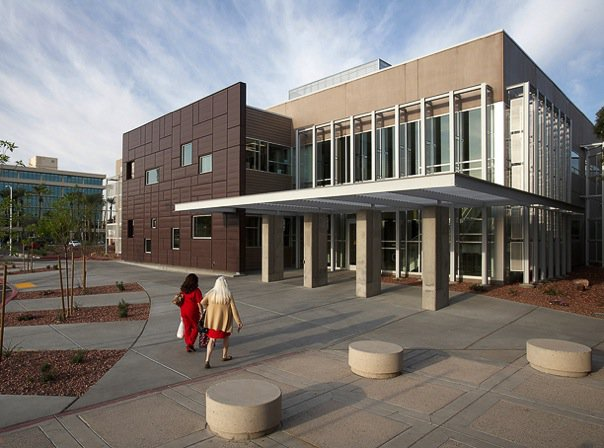
UNLV's School of Dental Medicine

In 2002, the School of Dental Medicine opened to train students, and to offer low-cost dental care to residents.

In 2003, the Institute for Security Studies was established to address homeland security concerns. The Lynn Bennett Childhood Development Center opened.

In 2004, UNLV opened its first regional campus on Shadow Lane, near the University Medical Center. The School of Dental Medicine is located on the Shadow Lane Campus. Also, the School of Public Health was established in the Division of Health Sciences to address new and emerging public-health issues.

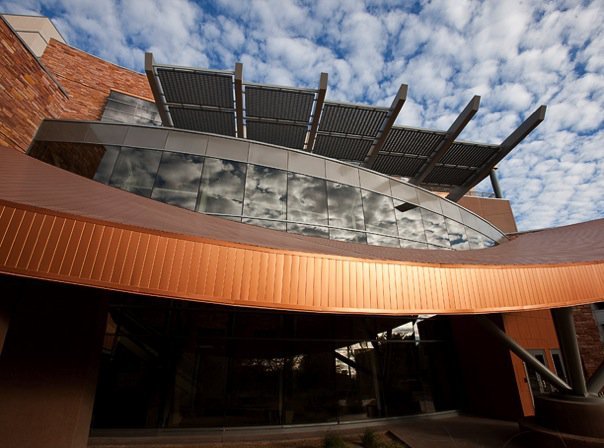
Science and Engineering Building

In 2005, construction began on the $113 million science and engineering building, which has 200,000 square feet of teaching space, laboratories, and high-tech conference rooms. The building, completed in 2008, was designed to support interdisciplinary research, draw students to high-demand fields such as electrical engineering, computer science, and environmental science, and attract national and international researchers. UNLV launched its first comprehensive campaign, Invent the Future, with the goal of raising $500 million by December 2008. Also, the Air Force ROTC program was established on campus.

In 2006, the Nevada System of Higher Education Board of Regents raised the minimum GPA to 3.0 for admittance to UNLV. UNLV opened its first international campus in Singapore, where the William F. Harrah College of Hotel Administration offered a bachelor's degree program in hospitality management. UNLV planned to end its partnership with the Singapore Institute of Technology by 2015, due to economic issues such as rising tuition in Las Vegas and the falling value of the U.S. dollar in Singapore.

In 2007, an expanded student union (with study and social lounges, eateries, a new ballroom, and a 300-seat theater) and a new student recreation center (with high-tech weight and fitness rooms, swimming pools, and a juice bar) opened in the fall. These facilities reflected UNLV's goal of becoming more student-oriented. The Greenspun College of Urban Affairs broke ground for the $94 million Greenspun Hall, which showcased the latest environmental and technological advancements and served as an anchor for "Midtown UNLV."

In 2011, UNLV's business college was formally renamed after a $15 million donation from the Ted and Doris Lee family, the Las Vegas real estate, hotel, restaurant, and casino investors.

In 2016, UNLV hosted the final presidential debate between Hillary Clinton and Donald Trump. The Hank Greenspun School of Journalism and Media Studies covered the debate on their local station, UNLV-TV. This featured a three-hour live broadcast of round-table student commentary, interviews, and coverage from the spin room inside the Thomas and Mack Center.

In 2017, UNLV shut down the only HIV clinic for children and pregnant women in the Southern Nevada region for ethical violations. UNLV later settled for $1.45 million related to improper charges made by principal investigator Echezona Ezeanolue to several federal research awards.

In 2018, UNLV President Len Jessup received unfavorable performance reviews from the system chancellor. Ethical concerns were raised when a $14 million donation was conditioned on his continual employment, but the UNLV Foundation Board of Trustees conducted an ethics investigation that uncovered no self-dealings by Jessup and the donor.

In 2019, UNLV renamed the School of Community Health Sciences as the School of Public Health.

=== Campus shooting ===
On December 6, 2023, a mass shooting occurred on campus when 67–year–old Anthony James Polito opened fire at the Frank and Estella Beam Hall and Student Union buildings. Polito, who had applied to be a professor at the campus but was rejected, killed three people and critically wounded a fourth before being fatally shot in a shootout with police.

One of the victims of the 2023 shooting, Patricia Navarro-Velez, was named as part of a federal investigation by the Department of Education into the school's diversity, equity, and inclusion (DEI) efforts alongside another professor who was no longer employed by the university. The investigation was part of the second Trump administration's efforts to remove DEI programs from within schools and government agencies. The school confirmed that Navarro-Velez was being investigated, and a spokesperson for the school said that she was part of the PhD Project, which is an organization which aims to recruit a "broader talent pipeline" into doctoral programs. On March 21, 2025, the Department of Education claimed that schools had violated the 1964 Civil Rights Act by partnering with the organization.

== Campus ==
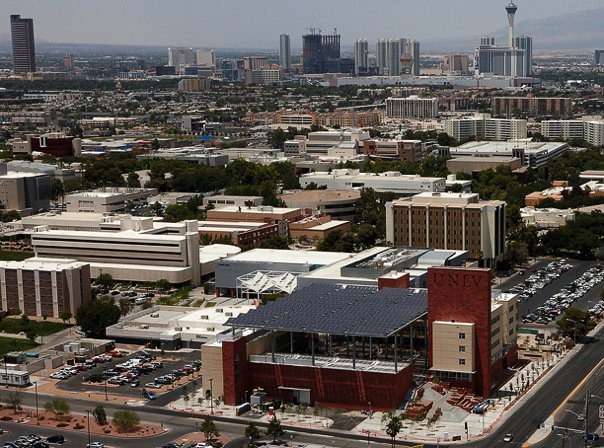
Aerial view of the main campus

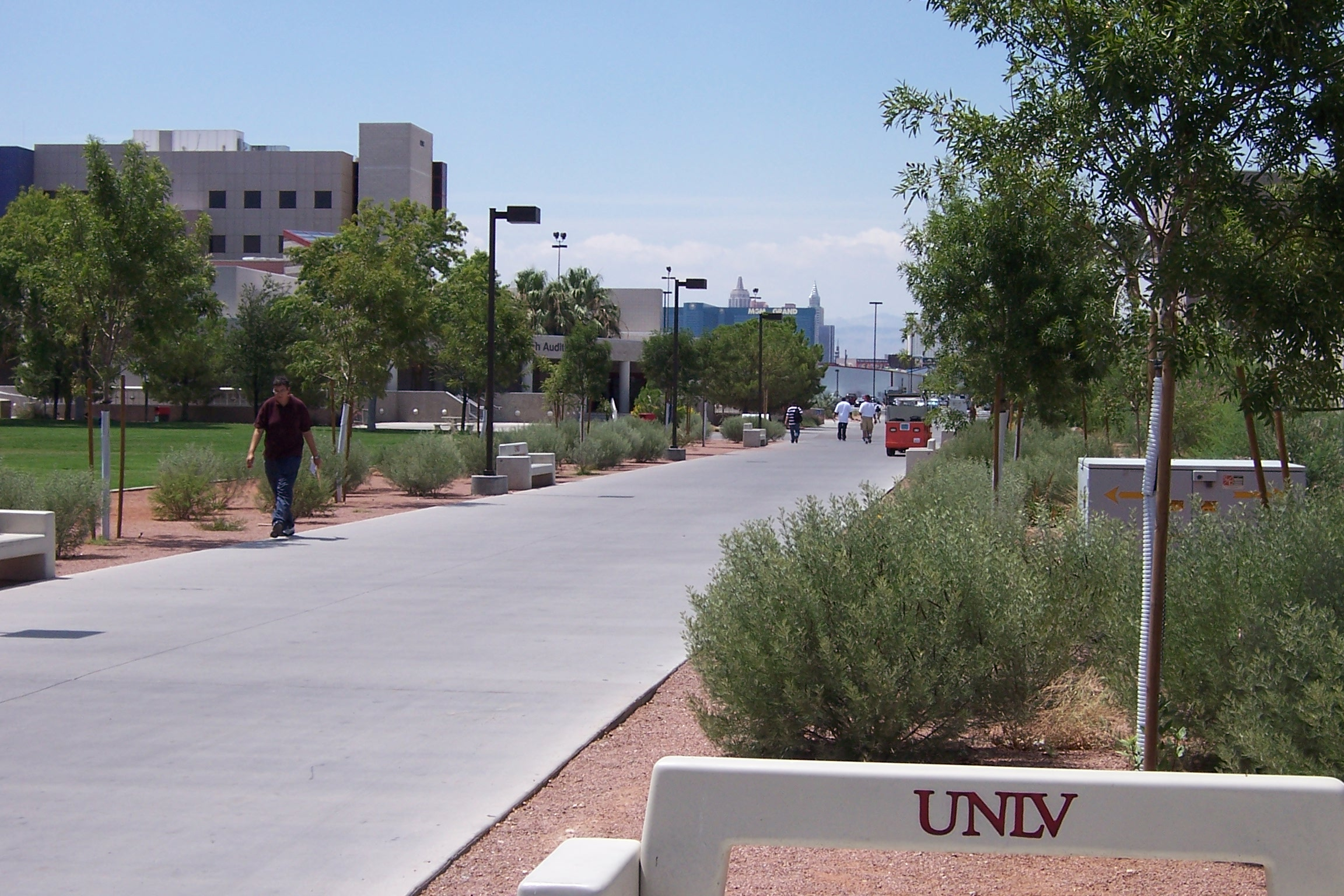
The Las Vegas Strip can be seen in the distance from various points on the UNLV campus.

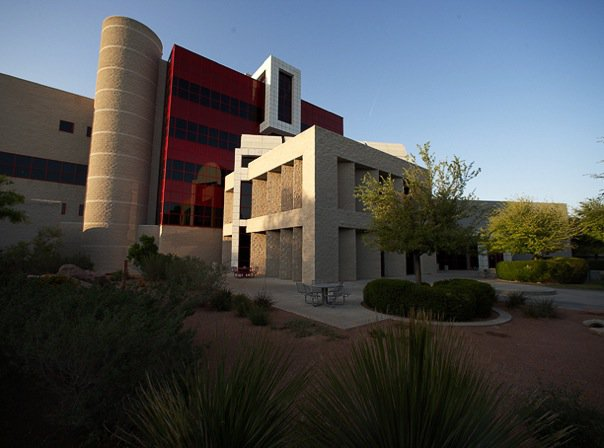
The Rod Lee Bigelow Health Sciences Building houses the offices, classrooms, and laboratories for health physics, nursing, radiological sciences, physical therapy, and kinesiology.

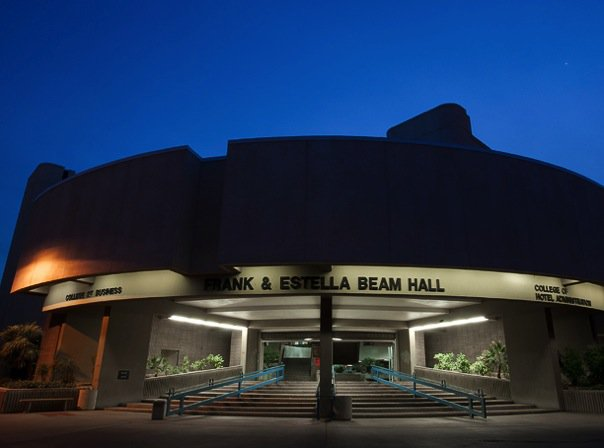
Beam Hall

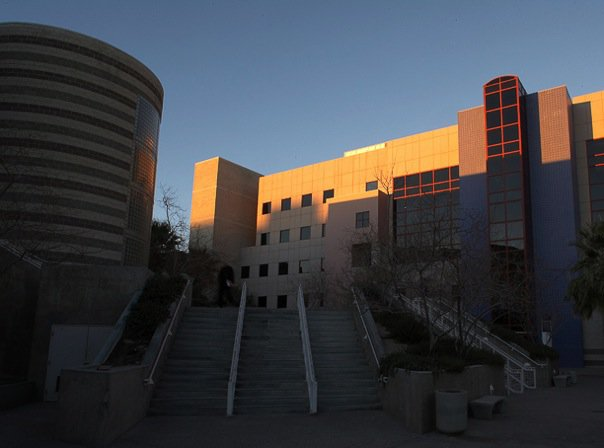
Carol C. Harter Classroom Building Complex

The main campus of UNLV is on 332-acres in centrally located Paradise, Nevada.

Midtown UNLV is an ongoing private-public development along Maryland Parkway, a border street to the school. Development began in 2002 and its purpose is to expand the university to meet the demands of a major university in the Las Vegas metropolitan area. The project to improve the "front door" of the university by improving amenities for students and businesses along Maryland Parkway. The goals are to reduce vacant spaces, lower business turnover rates, and create space for the university to expand. Additionally, the project aims to create new housing developments close to campus. Major funding is through state funding sources along with private donations.

=== Sustainability ===
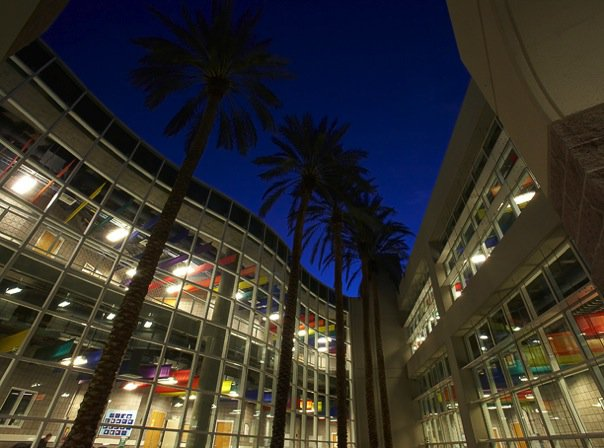
The glass wall of the Robert Bigelow Physics Building was built in the shape of a sine wave, while banners inside represent the colors of the spectrum.

The University of Nevada, Las Vegas has created an Urban Sustainability Initiative that strives to implement sustainable practices on campus and in the larger Las Vegas community. In addition to having two campus buildings in the process of LEED Silver Certification and one building in the process of LEED Gold Certification, UNLV has reduced its use of electricity and natural gas by 38% per square foot since 2001 by retrofitting older campus buildings. In the 2009 edition of the Sustainable Endowment Institute's College Sustainability Report Card, University of Nevada-Las Vegas received a grade of "C".

The Science and Engineering building received a LEED Silver rating in March 2009. SEB achieved this rating by using recycled glass, steel, concrete, and wood. More than 60% of the leftover construction materials were recycled. The roof of SEB was made to reflect 92% of sunlight. This reduces the amount of heat absorbed into the building, so reduces energy needed to cool the building. Incoming air to SEB is also cooled through evaporation so the need for air conditioning is reduced. High-performance window glazing also allows light to come in while keeping the building insulated. Occupancy sensors allow lights to automatically turn off when a room is not occupied, saving electricity. Low-flow sinks, toilets, and showers, as well as a drip irrigation system for the native desert landscape, reduce water usage by 42%. SEB also uses a reclaimed water system that captures wastewater, providing 750 gallons of water a day that are used to flush toilets.

The Greenspun College of Urban Affairs building of UNLV received a LEED Gold rating in April 2010.

In 2009, UNLV received the Cashman Good Government Award for the campus' sustainability measures for "maintaining consistent energy costs despite substantial campus growth," saving nearly $11 million from 2001 to 2009. UNLV was also recognized for managing the xeric demonstration garden and for its recycling efforts.

Recent efforts by the university to improve sustainability practices include participation in the Solar Decathlon and creation of a Sustainability Coordinator position to investigate methods for improving sustainability of residence halls.

=== Athletic facilities ===
UNLV's main athletic facilities include Thomas & Mack Center (1983), Cox Pavilion, Buchanan Natatorium, Earl Wilson Stadium, and Allegiant Stadium. These facilities hold home games for UNLV sports programs and have hosted events such as the Mountain West Conference basketball tournament and the National Finals Rodeo.

In 2007, the 188,000 sq ft (17,500 m^{2}) recreation center was completed.

The Mendenhall Center, a training center dedicated for the UNLV basketball program, opened in 2012. The Fertitta Football Complex for UNLV Football opened in 2019.

=== Other notable buildings ===
Performing arts facilities include the Judy Bayley Theatre (1972), the Artemus W. Ham Concert Hall (1976), the Black Box Theatre, the Alta Ham Fine Arts Complex (1982), and the Lee and Thomas Beam Music Center (2001).

In 2007, a new 135,000 sq ft (12,500 m^{2}) student union was opened. This building offers many amenities for students including a social atmosphere, a diverse food court, conference rooms, a game room, student government offices, and student organization offices.

Greenspun Hall opened its doors in 2008. It houses the Greenspun College of Urban Affairs and the Brookings Mountain West Institute. It also houses the campus radio station KUNV-FM, student-run HD2 radio station, and the television production organization UNLV-TV. The building is named after Las Vegas Sun founder and publisher Hank Greenspun, whose family donated $37 million for the building.

== Organization and administration ==
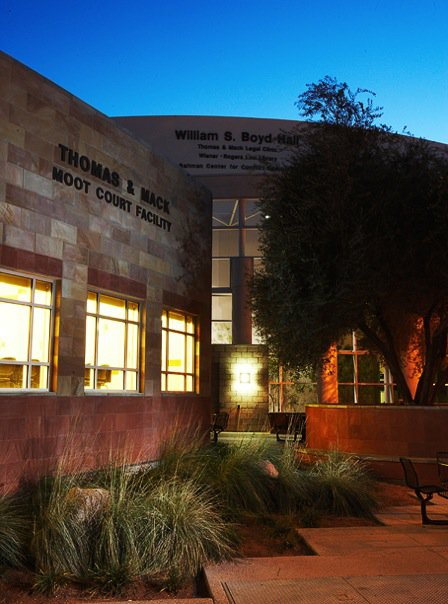
Boyd School of Law

UNLV offers more than 350 bachelor's, master's, and doctoral degree programs taught by 850 faculty members.

Academic schools, colleges and divisions:

- School of Integrated Health Sciences
- School of Architecture
- School of Public Health
- College of Education
- Howard R. Hughes College of Engineering
- College of Fine Arts
- Graduate College
- Honors College
- William F. Harrah College of Hospitality
- Hank Greenspun School of Journalism & Media Studies
- College of Liberal Arts
- School of Music
- College of Sciences
- Greenspun College of Urban Affairs
- School of Public Policy and Leadership
- School of Environment and Public Affairs
- School of Social Work
- Department of Communication Studies
- Department of Criminal Justice

Professional schools:

- Kirk Kerkorian School of Medicine
- Lee Business School
- School of Dental Medicine
- School of Nursing
- William S. Boyd School of Law

=== Black Mountain Institute ===
The Black Mountain Institute is a literary center at the university. It focuses on "live experiences, fellowships, innovative media, and literary activism".

== Administrators ==
=== List of presidents ===
The following served as president of the University of Nevada, Las Vegas:

No.	Portrait	President	Term start	Term end	Refs.
1		Donald C. Moyer	1965	1968	
2		Roman J. Zorn	1969	1973	
3		Donald H. Baepler	1973	1978	
acting		Brock Dixon	1978	1979	
4		Leonard E. "Pat" Goodall	1979	1984	
5		Robert C. Maxson	1984	1994	
6 (Note: Interim president)		Kenny C. Guinn	1994	June 30, 1995	
7		Carol C. Harter	July 1, 1995	June 30, 2006	
8		David B. Ashley	July 1, 2006	July 11, 2009	
9		Neal J. Smatresk	August 6, 2009	January 31, 2014	
acting		Donald D. Snyder	February 1, 2014	January 4, 2015	
10		Len Jessup	January 5, 2015	June 30, 2018	
acting		Marta Meana	July 1, 2018	August 23, 2020	
11		Keith E. Whitfield	August 24, 2020	March 3, 2025	
acting (Note: Served as officer in charge.)		Chris Heavey	March 4, 2025	April 24, 2025	
interim (Note: Served as interim president.)		Chris Heavey	April 25, 2025	present	

Table notes:

== Academics ==
=== Undergraduate admissions ===
Fall freshman statistics
	2016	2015	2014	2013	2012
Applicants	8,533	7,666	7,408	7,343	6,366
Admits	7,064	6,781	6,437	6,250	5,133
% admitted	82.8	88.5	86.9	85.1	80.6
Avg GPA	3.31	3.28	3.24	3.25	3.24
SAT range*	900–1130	890–1120	880–1110	890–1110	880–1110
ACT range	19–24	18–25	19–24	19–24	18–24
*(out of 1600)

UNLV's admissions process is considered "selective" according to U.S. News & World Report. For freshmen entering fall 2018, 9,527 were accepted out of 11,613 applicants, and 3,947 enrolled. Women constituted 57.9% of the incoming class; men were 42.1%.

Among freshman students who enrolled in fall 2016, SAT scores for the middle 50% ranged from 450 to 560 for critical reading, 450–570 for math, and 430–540 for writing. ACT composite scores for the middle 50% ranged from 19 to 24. In terms of class rank, 20% of enrolled freshmen were in the top 10% of their high school classes; 52% ranked in the top quarter, and 82% ranked in the top half. The average high school grade point average was 3.31.

=== Reputation and rankings ===
Academic rankings

National
- Forbes: 317
- U.S. News & World Report: 244 (tie)
- Washington Monthly: 138
- WSJ/College Pulse: 330

Global
- ARWU: 601–700
- THE: 601–800
- U.S. News & World Report: 747 (tie)

According to the QS World University Rankings, William F. Harrah College of Hospitality's Hotel Administration program is ranked No. 4 in the world in 2025.

The Atlantic recognized UNLV's English department as having one of the nation's most innovative master of fine arts programs and one of the top-five doctoral programs in creative writing.

Down Beat magazine, a trade publication for jazz music, recognized the work of the 2010 UNLV Jazz Ensemble as "Outstanding Large Jazz Ensemble Performance" among graduate college-level jazz bands in their annual Student Music Award issue of that year.

In 2018, UNLV surpassed New York University as the most diverse university for undergraduates according to U.S. News & World Report.

=== Libraries ===
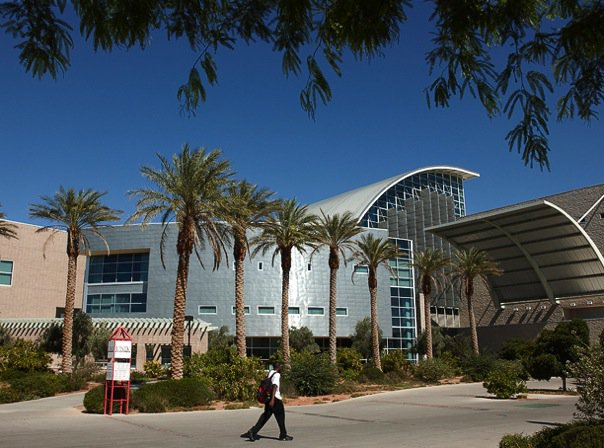
University libraries

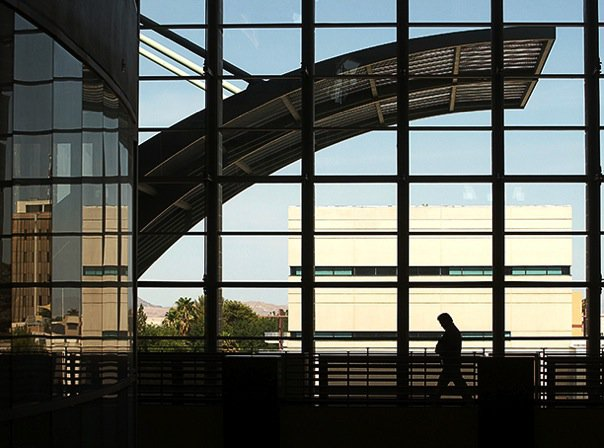
A view through the windows of Lied Library. The library holds more than a million volumes and has 2,500 study spaces.

UNLV has several libraries on the main campus. The biggest is the Lied Library in the center of campus. Opened in 2001, the 301,000-square-foot (28,000 m^{2}), $58 million facility is named for real estate entrepreneur Ernst W. Lied.

Many colleges also have their individual libraries that hold materials more closely related to the college:

- The Architecture Studies Library in the UNLV School of Architecture
- The Teacher Development & Resources Library in the College of Education
- The Music Library in the Lee & Thomas Beam Music Center
- The Wiener-Rogers Law Library in the William S. Boyd School of Law
- The School of Medicine Library

=== Research ===
UNLV research and economic development activities increased for the fourth consecutive year, according to the fiscal-year-end report from the Division of Research and Economic Development. Research awards rose by 7.5 percent to nearly $34.5 million, and proposals increased by two percent. Research expenditures in FY18 totaled $37 million.

The College of Sciences received the largest amount of award funding among the colleges once again this fiscal year: nearly $15 million through more than 100 awards. Engineering followed with roughly $7.6 million in awards. The College of Education posted the largest percentage gain in award funding in FY16, with a nearly 47% increase from $1,776,332 in FY15 to $2,609,366 in FY16.

UNLV's economic development activities continue to grow. Sixty-one patents were filed in FY16, an increase of 17% over FY15, and licensing revenue doubled from $126,242 in FY15 to $252,309 in FY16.

Another measure of university research activity is the number of doctoral degrees conferred, as doctoral programs require a strong research component culminating in the doctoral dissertation. UNLV doctoral conferrals increased nearly 13% in FY16 to 166 degrees conferred. For the 2017–2018 school year, 163 doctoral degrees were conferred.

== Student life ==
Undergraduate demographics as of Fall 2023
Race and ethnicity	Total
Hispanic	35%
White	23%
Asian	16%
Two or more races	14%
Black	9%
International student	2%
Native Hawaiian/Pacific Islander	1%
Economic diversity
Low-income (Note: The percentage of students who received an income-based federal Pell grant intended for low-income students.)	41%
Affluent (Note: The percentage of students who are a part of the American middle class at the bare minimum.)	59%

=== Student government ===
The Consolidated Students of the University of Nevada, Las Vegas (CSUN) is the undergraduate student government at UNLV.

Together with UNLV, CSUN founded an on-campus preschool in 1974 as part of the College of Education. Both students and staff can use this accredited preschool.

=== Student organizations ===
UNLV has over 350 student organizations. To become official, the organization must become recognized by UNLV's Involvement Center.

=== Newspaper ===
The Scarlet and Gray Free Press is the student newspaper on campus. It covers many topics about higher education in UNLV and the state. The paper extensively covers CSUN senate meetings and elections. It is printed twice weekly and posts its articles online. Recently, the newspaper's name was changed from Rebel Yell to its current iteration, as the former title was criticized for its reference to Confederate culture.

=== Fraternities and sororities ===
There are numerous Greek life organizations on campus.

== Athletics ==
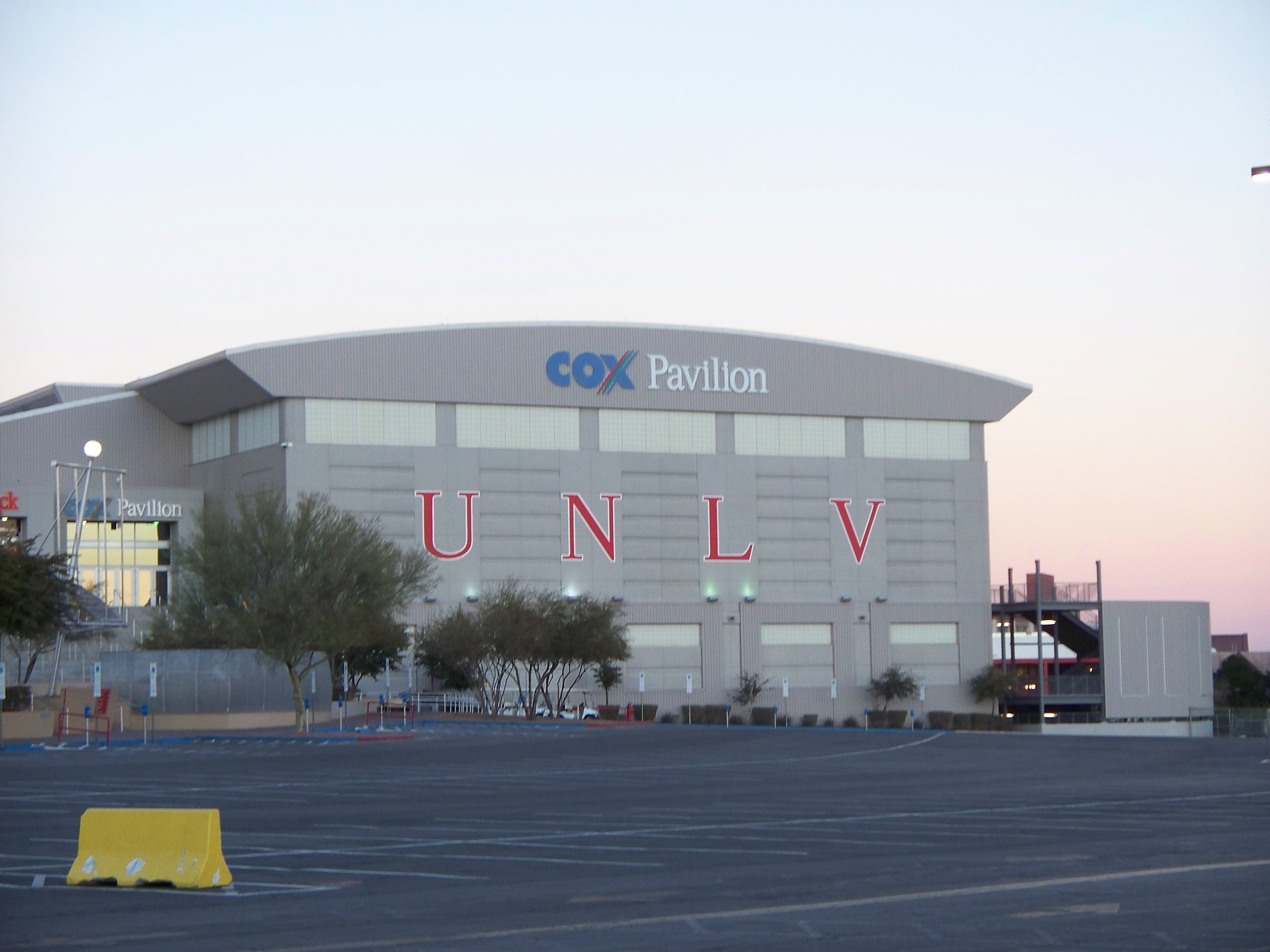
The Thomas and Mack Center and adjoining Cox Pavilion house many of the university's athletic teams.

UNLV supports varsity teams in 16 different sports. The men's basketball team is referred to as the Runnin' Rebels and the men's baseball team is referred to as the Hustlin' Rebels. The Rebels are a founding member of the Mountain West Conference, in the NCAA's Division I. The only exceptions are the UNLV men's soccer team and swim and dive team, which compete in the Western Athletic Conference.

The school's official colors of scarlet and gray can be traced to 1958, when UNLV adopted as mascot a wolf wearing a Confederate uniform. Scarlet and gray were traditional colors of the Confederacy with its gray uniforms and red-based flag. UNLV's mascot was Hey Reb!, the toned-down version of the original mascot named Beauregard, which was a wolf character dressed in Confederate hat and uniform. UNLV's Hey Reb mascot made his debut in 1983.

On June 16, 2020, amid protests of racial inequality related to the murder of George Floyd, UNLV announced the removal of the Hey Reb! statue in front of the Tam Alumni Center, stating: "In recent conversations with the donor we mutually agreed it was best to remove the statue and return it." The university's president Marta Meana clarified the decision: "Over the past few months, I have had discussions with multiple individuals and stakeholder groups from campus and the community on how best the university can move forward given recent events throughout our nation".

UNLV has many traditions in its athletic programs. Each year, the men's football team plays the Nevada Wolf Pack in a football game called the Battle for Nevada. The trophy for that game is the Fremont Cannon. Built by the Kennecott Copper Corp., Nevada Mines Division, the cannon is valued at more than $10,000 and is considered one of the best and loudest, symbols of rivalry in college football. The cannon was permanently silenced in 2000, when Rebel players and fans accidentally dropped the trophy during a victory celebration. Since then, the teams continue the tradition with the victor painting the Fremont Cannon with the inscription of "University of Notta Lotta Victories" or "University of Northern Rejects". While UNLV trails Nevada in the series 29–21, the Rebels have won each of the last three meetings heading into the 2025 season.

UNLV is most known for its men's basketball program. Made famous by Coach Jerry Tarkanian in the 1970s–1990s, the Runnin' Rebels are the third-most winning team in Division I basketball history by percentage, only behind Kentucky and North Carolina (.713, 1037–418 through 2008). The UNLV team is well known for their 1990 NCAA Men's Division I Basketball Championship by defeating Duke University 103–73, which was and still is the largest margin of victory in a championship game. In that same game, UNLV became the first team to break 100 points in a championship game.

UNLV is also known for its golf program. Led by coach Dwaine Knight, the UNLV golf program has turned out PGA Tour pros such as Adam Scott, Chris Riley, Chad Campbell, Ryan Moore, Skip Kendall, Charley Hoffman, Bill Lunde, Andres Gonzales, and Garrick Higgo. They won the NCAA Division I Men's National Golf Championship in 1998. In February 2011, the Rebel men's swimming and diving team won their seventh-straight Mountain West Conference titles. Three Rebel swimmers competed in the 2008 Beijing Olympics; Joe Bartoch and Richard Hortness represented Canada and Jonas Anderson represented Sweden.

== Notable people ==
=== Faculty ===
Notable faculty include:

- Rita Deanin Abbey (1930–2021)
- David B. Ashley (b. 1951)
- John Boehner (b. 1949)
- Felicia F. Campbell (1931–2020)
- Maile Chapman
- Mary Croughan
- John Farley (1948–2022)
- Clarence Gilyard (1955–2022)
- Kenny Guinn (1936–2010)
- Carol Harter (1941-2023)
- Hans-Hermann Hoppe (b. 1949)
- Michel Hugo (1930–2010)
- Len Jessup
- Claudia Keelan
- Lawrence L. Larmore
- Robert Maxson (b. 1936)
- Harry Reid (1939–2021)
- Donald Revell (b. 1954)
- Murray Rothbard (1926–1995)
- Brian Sandoval (b. 1963)
- David Schmoeller (b. 1947)
- Cathy Scott (c. 1950)
- Neal Smatresk (b. 1951)
- Wole Soyinka (b. 1934)
- Randall Stout (1958–2014)
- Dina Titus (b. 1950)
- Michael Tylo (1948–2021)
- Douglas A. Unger (b. 1952)
- Derek Walcott
- Richard Wiley (b. 1944)

=== Alumni ===
Many former students have gone on to local and national prominence. This includes many athletes who have excelled at the collegiate and professional levels:

- Greg Anthony (b. 1967)
- Joel Anthony (b. 1982)
- Stacey Augmon (b. 1968)
- Anthony Bennett (b. 1993)
- Brian Boehringer (b. 1969), pitcher for the New York Yankees
- Chad Campbell (b. 1974)
- Ben Carter (b. 1994)
- Ryan Claridge (b. 1981)
- Randall Cunningham (b. 1963)
- Cecil Fielder (b. 1963)
- Joe Hawley (b. 1988)
- Larry Johnson (b. 1969)
- Ryan Ludwick (b. 1978)
- Shawn Marion (b. 1978)
- Keenan McCardell (b. 1970)
- Shaquille Murray-Lawrence (b. 1993)
- Efren Navarro (b. 1986)
- Ryan Reeves (b. 1981)
- Adam Scott (b. 1980)
- Bryson Stott (b. 1997)
- Reggie Theus (b. 1957)
- Matt Williams (b. 1965)
- Ickey Woods (b. 1966)

Former Rebels in the entertainment world include:

- Chris Cox, Grammy Award-nominated record producer and DJ
- Dan "Tito" Davis (b. 1953), international fugitive and author
- Tabitha and Napoleon D'umo, Emmy Award-winning choreographers
- Guy Fieri (b. 1968), chef, restaurateur, and Food Network star
- Ginger Fish (b. 1965), band member of Marilyn Manson
- Brian Garth (b. 1979), sound engineer, producer, songwriter and guitarist for rock band Black Camaro
- Ryan Higa (b. 1990), YouTube personality
- Jimmy Kimmel (b. 1967), actor, comedian and late-night talk show host of Jimmy Kimmel Live!
- Suge Knight (b. 1965), entrepreneur and CEO of Death Row Records, also played football at UNLV
- Tomi Lahren (b. 1992), conservative political commentator and former host of the show Tomi for TheBlaze
- Bryan Le (b. 1996), YouTube personality
- Kenny Mayne (b. 1959), ESPN sports journalist
- Tom Miller (b. 1976), artist, singer, and songwriter for rock band Black Camaro
- Ronnie Vannucci (b. 1976), drummer for the American rock band The Killers
- Daliah Wachs (b.1971), talk show host, media personality, creator National Blood Donation Day National Blood Donation Week, author
- Eric Whitacre (b. 1970), Grammy Award-winning composer and conductor
- Anthony E. Zuiker (b. 1968), creator and executive producer of the CSI television series franchise

UNLV has also produced politicians, including:

- Irene Bustamante Adams (b. 1968), former Nevada state assemblywoman
- Nelson Araujo (b. 1987), former Nevada state assemblyman
- Bob Beers (b. 1959), former Las Vegas city councilman, former Nevada state senator and former Nevada state assemblyman
- Shelley Berkley (b. 1951), former U.S. representative
- James Bilbray (1938–2021), former U.S. representative
- Nicole Cannizzaro (b. 1983), Nevada state senator
- Zach Conine (b. 1981), Nevada state treasurer
- John Ensign (b. 1958), former U.S. senator and former U.S. representative
- Edgar Flores (b. 1986), Nevada state assemblyman
- Lucy Flores (b. 1979), former Nevada state assemblywoman
- Jason Frierson (b. 1970), Nevada state assemblyman
- Chris Giunchigliani (b. 1954), former vice chair of the Clark County Commission and former Nevada state assemblywoman
- Carolyn Goodman (b. 1939), mayor of Las Vegas
- Gregory Hafen II, Nevada state assemblyman
- Scott Hammond (b. 1966), Nevada state senator and former Nevada state assemblyman
- Mark Hutchison (b. 1963), former lieutenant governor of Nevada and former Nevada state senator
- Sandra Jauregui (b. 1983), Nevada state assemblywoman
- Ruben Kihuen (b. 1980), former U.S. representative, former Nevada state senator and former Nevada state assemblyman
- Joe Lombardo (b. 1962), governor of Nevada, former sheriff of Clark County
- Marilyn Dondero Loop (b. 1951), Nevada state senator and former Nevada state assemblywoman
- James Ohrenschall (b. 1972), Nevada state senator and former Nevada state assemblyman
- David Parks (b. 1943), Nevada state senator and former Nevada state assemblyman
- Keith Pickard (b. 1962), Nevada state senator
- David Roger (b. 1961), former Clark County district attorney
- Steve Sisolak (b. 1953), governor of Nevada and former chair of the Clark County Commission
- Kim Wallin (b. 1956), former Nevada state controller
- Joyce Woodhouse (b. 1944), Nevada state senator
- Bill Young (b. 1956), former sheriff of Clark County

Other notable alumni include:

- Francis J. Beckwith (b. 1960), Christian philosopher
- Justin Favela (b. 1986), mixed-media artist
- George J. Maloof, Jr. (b. 1964), president of Maloof Hotels and former owner of the Sacramento Kings
- Danny Tarkanian (b. 1961), attorney, businessman, and son of former basketball head coach Jerry Tarkanian

== See also ==
- National Supercomputing Center for Energy and the Environment, a supercomputing facility located on campus
