= National Supercomputing Center for Energy and the Environment =

The National Supercomputing Center for Energy and the Environment (NSCEE), is a supercomputing facility housed at UNLV in Las Vegas, Nevada. It was established in 1989 by an act of Congress, PL-101. The facility is used to address a wide variety of scientific studies and applications.

== Supercomputers ==
- Silicon Graphics
- Sun Microsystems
