= Neal Smatresk =

President of the University of North Texas

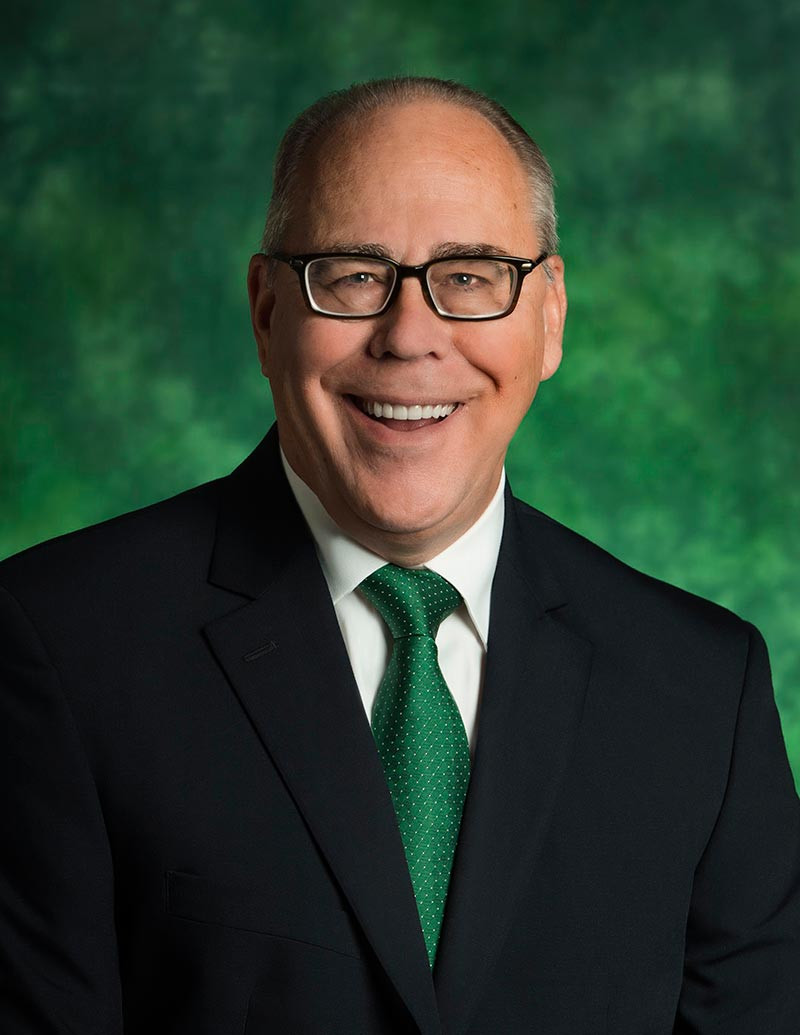
- Smatresk in 2016

16th President of the University of North Texas
- In office February 3, 2014 – August 1, 2024
- Preceded by: Veldon Lane Rawlins
- Succeeded by: Harrison Keller

9th President of the University of Nevada, Las Vegas
- In office August 6, 2009 – January 2014
- Preceded by: David Brian Ashley
- Succeeded by: Leonard Michael Jessup

Personal details
- Born: July 9, 1951 (age 75) New York City, U.S.
- Spouse: Deborah Hoddick
- Education: Gettysburg College (BA); University at Buffalo (MA); University of Texas at Austin (PhD)
- Website: president.unt.edu

Neal Joseph Smatresk (/ˈsmɑːtrɛsk/ SMAH-tresk; born July 9, 1951), is an American academic research biologist, physiologist, and university president, who served as president of the University of North Texas from 2014 to 2024. Smatresk was previously president of the University of Nevada, Las Vegas, a role he held from 2009 to 2014.

== Career ==
=== Executive roles in higher education ===
From 2004 to 2007, Smatresk served at the University of Hawaii at Manoa as vice chancellor for academic affairs (aka chief academic officer). From 2007 to 2009, Smatresk served at the University of Nevada, Las Vegas, as executive vice president and provost. Then on July 10, 2009, Smatresk stepped in as acting president, and on August 6, 2009, he became president. Smatresk was president of the University of North Texas from February 3, 2014 until his retirement on August 1, 2024.

=== Academic research and teaching ===
In 1979, Smatresk participated in a research expedition of alpha helix in Micronesia under the auspices of the National Science Foundation. From 1980 to 1982, Smatresk was a National Institutes of Health trainee at University of Pennsylvania School of Medicine in Philadelphia. From 1982 to 2004, he served on the faculty at The University of Texas at Arlington – from 1982 to 1988, he was assistant professor of biology, from 1988 to 1994, he was associate professor of biology, from 1994 to 1998, he was chairman of the biology department, and from 1998 to 2004, he was dean of science. While at UT Arlington, Smatresk chiefly researched how respiratory neurobiology of vertebrates changes during the evolutionary transition from aquatic breathing to aerial breathing.

Smatresk has published over 50 papers and book chapters in the field of marine biology and cardiorespiratory physiology and has won grants from the National Science Foundation and the National Institutes of Health.

== Formal education ==
Smatresk earned a high school diploma from Kenmore West Senior High School, Town of Tonawanda, NY (1969). He went on to earn a Bachelor of Arts degree in biology from Gettysburg College (1973; awarded Distinguished Alumnus in 2011). He then earned a Master of Arts degree in biology from the University at Buffalo, The State University of New York (1978). And finally, he earned a PhD in zoology and marine science from the University of Texas at Austin through its Marine Science Institute at Port Aransas (1980). Smatresk did postdoctoral training at the University of Pennsylvania School of Medicine.

Smatresk's extracurricular activities in high school included interscholastic sports, namely track and field — the high jump. Smatresk sang in the Kenmore High School and Gettysburg College choirs, the latter of which toured every year. In December 1970, Smatresk performed with the Gettysburg College Choir at the White House for President Richard Nixon.

Academic offices
Preceded by David B. Ashley	9th President of the University of Nevada, Las Vegas; August 6, 2009 – November 2013	Succeeded by Len Jessup
Preceded by Veldon Lane Rawlins	16th President of the University of North Texas; February 3, 2014 – August 1, 2024	Succeeded by Harrison Keller
