= Harrison Keller (academic) =

American academic

17th President of the University of North Texas
- Incumbent
- Assumed office August 1, 2024
- Preceded by: Neal Smatresk

Commissioner of the Texas Higher Education Coordinating Board
- In office 2019–2024
- Preceded by: Raymund A. Paredes
- Succeeded by: Sarah Keyton (interim)

Personal details
- Born: Jerry William Harrison Keller; December 15, 1970 (age 55) Plainview, Texas, U.S.
- Spouse: Gena Nivens Keller
- Children: 4
- Education: University of Notre Dame (BA); Georgetown University (MA, PhD)

Military service
- Allegiance: United States
- Branch/service: U.S. Navy Reserve
- Years of service: 2005–2015

Harrison Keller (born Jerry William Harrison Keller; December 15, 1970) is an American academic, former education commissioner, and current president of the University of North Texas (UNT) in Denton. He assumed office August 1, 2024, succeeding Neal Smatresk. He was officially installed as UNT President on November 13, 2024.

Prior to becoming President of UNT, Keller served in numerous leadership roles at the University of Texas at Austin, and served as commissioner of the Texas Higher Education Coordinating Board from 2019 to 2024.

In November 2025, Keller announced the Look North: UNT 2030 Strategic Plan. The plan includes a $100 million fundraising campaign to support student success.

Previously, Keller held multiple leadership roles at the University of Texas at Austin, serving as Deputy to the President for Strategy and Policy, Vice Provost for Higher Education Policy and Research, and Executive Director of the Center for Teaching and Learning.

== Bibliography ==
=== Primary references ===
- UNT: "Investiture". Denton: University of North Texas. Archived from the original on April 3, 2025.
- UNT: "President Keller Bio". Office of the President. Denton: University of North Texas. Archived from the original on April 3, 2025.
- UNT News: "UNT System Board of Regents Names Harrison Keller UNT's Next President". July 1, 2024. Archived from the original on August 1, 2024.
