= UNLV College of Education =

Coordinates: 36.1093°N 115.1403°W

- Other names: UNLV CoE
- Parent institution: University of Nevada, Las Vegas
- Dean: Kim Metcalf
- Undergraduates: 2,000
- Postgraduates: 800
- Location: Las Vegas, NV, U.S.
- Website: unlv.edu/education

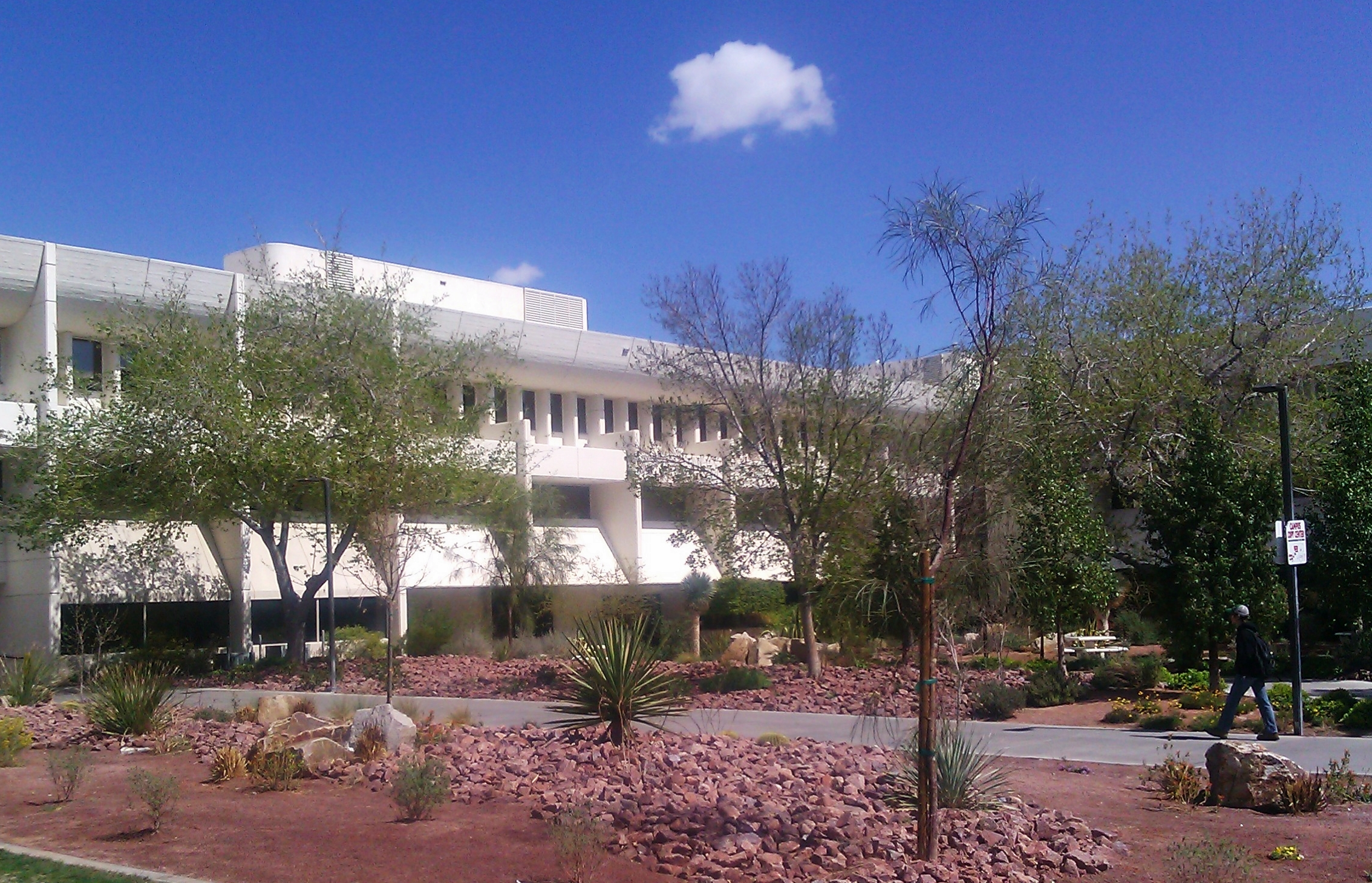
The College of Education Building (CEB)

The UNLV College of Education is an academic unit of the University of Nevada, Las Vegas (UNLV).

Approximately 2,000 undergraduate students are enrolled in the college, with more than half pursuing majors in elementary and secondary education. An additional 800 students are enrolled at the graduate level. The college offers Bachelor's, Master's, Doctoral, and certificate programs.

The college has won national recognition for its teacher education program, Cultural Diversity Bridge to Academic Success. Several facilities and centers serve the needs of the southern Nevada community while also providing students a living laboratory to develop their skills in counseling, administration, and teaching.

== Departments, programs, and research ==
- Department of Counselor Education, School Psychology, and Human Services
- Department of Early Childhood, Multilingual, and Special Education
- Department of Educational Psychology, Leadership, and Higher Education
- Department of Teaching & Learning

These departments offer programs in early childhood education, elementary education, secondary education, special education, English language learning, clinical mental health counseling, school counseling, school psychology, educational policy and leadership, higher education, learning and technology, curriculum and instruction, and teacher education.

The college contains seven research centers and clinics dedicated to scholarship and best practices in literacy, autism spectrum disorders, mental health, assessment and evaluation, and multicultural, STEM, and early childhood education.

== Accreditation ==
All programs at the University of Nevada, Las Vegas, are accredited by the Northwest Commission on Colleges and Universities. In addition to this accreditation, some programs carry additional accreditations in their specific areas.

The following programs are accredited by the National Council for Accreditation of Teacher Education at the Bachelor's, Master's, and Doctoral degree levels:

- Elementary Education
- Secondary Education
- Special Education
- K-12 Teaching
- Physical Education

The following programs are accredited by the National Council for Accreditation of Teacher Education at the Master's Level:

- Reading Supervision
- Physical Education

The Master's of Education in School Counseling is accredited by the Council for Accreditation of Counseling and Related Educational Programs.

The following program holds membership in the University Council on Educational Administration at the Master's, Specialist, and Doctoral levels:

- School Administration
- Reading Supervision
