= David B. Ashley =

American academic administrator

8th President of the University of Nevada, Las Vegas
- In office July 1, 2006 – July 10, 2009
- Preceded by: Carol Harter
- Succeeded by: Neal Smatresk

Personal details
- Born: January 5, 1951 (age 75) Winchester, Massachusetts, U.S.
- Education: Massachusetts Institute of Technology; Stanford University

David Brian Ashley (born January 5, 1951) was the eighth president of the University of Nevada, Las Vegas. He was appointed to the position on July 1, 2006 and relieved of his duties by the Board of Regents on July 10, 2009.

Ashley attended MIT, becoming a member of the Sigma Chi fraternity, and graduated in 1973. His bachelor's degree and master's degree, also of MIT, are both in civil engineering; he has a second master's degree in engineering-economic systems and a doctorate in civil engineering from Stanford University. He served as the founding executive vice chancellor and provost at the University of California, Merced starting in 2001 and was the dean of the College of Engineering at Ohio State University.

Ashley's professional experiences as a civil engineer and as an expert in construction management include work on major projects around the globe. He has been called upon to work on the expansion of the Panama Canal and the San Francisco-Oakland Bay Bridge.

In 2000, Ashley received an honorary doctorate from the Chalmers University in Sweden for his academic contributions.

On July 10, 2009, Ashley was relieved of his duties as President of UNLV by the Board of Regents of the Nevada System of Higher Education, effective immediately. Executive Vice President and Provost Neal Smatresk immediately became the Acting President of UNLV. Ashley retains his position as a tenured professor of Civil Engineering. He will continue to receive his presidential salary of $242,424 until his contract expires.

Academic offices
Preceded by Carol Harter	President of the University of Nevada, Las Vegas; July 1, 2006 – July 10, 2009	Succeeded by Neal Smatresk
