= Carol Harter =

American academic administrator (1941–2023)

7th President of the University of Nevada, Las Vegas
- In office 1995–2006
- Preceded by: Kenny Guinn (interim)
- Succeeded by: David B. Ashley

Personal details
- Born: June 1, 1941 Brooklyn, New York, U.S.
- Died: September 14, 2023 (aged 82) San Diego, California, U.S.
- Spouse: Michael Thomas Harter
- Children: 2
- Education: Binghamton University
- Website: https://president.unlv.edu

Carol Ann Clancey Harter (June 1, 1941 – September 14, 2023) was an American academic administrator and Faulkner scholar. She was the seventh president of the University of Nevada, Las Vegas (UNLV), serving from 1995 to 2006. She was the first woman president at UNLV, and the first woman president of the State University of New York at Geneseo, where she was the executive from 1989 to 1995.

== Early life and education ==
Harter was born in Brooklyn, New York, the daughter of Ross H. Clancey and Catherine Schweitzer Clancey. Her father was a financial planner. She earned her bachelor's, master's and doctoral degrees in English from Binghamton University. Her Ph.D. dissertation was titled "The diaphoric structure and unity of William Faulkner's Go Down Moses" (1970).

== Career ==
Harter became a faculty member in the English department at Ohio University in 1970. She moved into administrative roles there, as ombudsman, dean of students, and vice-president for administration. In 1985 she was a finalist for the presidency of Western Michigan University. She was the eleventh president of SUNY Geneseo, which she led for six years, from 1989 to 1995. She was the first woman president of SUNY Geneseo. In 1994 she was a finalist for the presidency of Ohio State University.

Harter was the seventh president of the University of Nevada, Las Vegas, serving from 1995 to 2006; she was the longest-serving president in UNLV history. Her tenure as president saw UNLV's academic status improve, and its library expanded and upgraded. She was succeeded as president of UNLV by David B. Ashley on July 1, 2006. At her retirement from the UNLV presidency, Harter became executive director of UNLV's new Black Mountain Institute (BMI), now renamed the Beverly Rogers and Carol C. Harter Black Mountain Institute.

== Publications ==
- "The Winter of Isaac McCaslin: Revisions and Irony in Faulkner's 'Delta Autumn'" (1970)
- "Recent Faulkner Scholarship: Five More Turns of the Screw" (1974, review essay)
- "America as' Consumer Garden': The Nightmare Vision of Joyce Carol Oates" (1974)
- From Athens Out: Fiction, Poetry, Drama of the Ohio University Writers (1975, with Robert J. DeMott)
- "Women and Minority Professional Staff in Student Personnel" (1982, with Gary Moden and Peter A. Wilson)
- "Pataki's budget threatens access to, success of universities" (1995, op-ed piece)

== Personal life ==
Clancey married fellow academic Michael Harter in 1961. They had two sons. She died on September 14, 2023, at the age of 82, in San Diego, California. There is a large classroom building complex at UNLV named for Harter.

Academic offices
Preceded by Kenny Guinn (interim)	President of the University of Nevada, Las Vegas; 1995–2006	Succeeded by David B. Ashley
