= V. Lane Rawlins =

American academic administrator (born 1937)

Veldon Lane Rawlins

15th President of the University of North Texas
- In office 2010–2014
- Preceded by: Philip C. Diebel (Interim)
- Succeeded by: Neal Smatresk

President of Washington State University
- In office 2000–2007
- Preceded by: Samuel H. Smith
- Succeeded by: Elson Floyd

President of the University of Memphis
- In office 1991–2000
- Preceded by: Thomas G. Carpenter
- Succeeded by: Ralph Faudree (Interim)

Personal details
- Born: November 30, 1937 (age 88) Idaho, U.S.
- Spouse: Mary Jo Love
- Children: 3
- Education: Brigham Young University (BS); University of California, Berkeley (PhD)

V. Lane Rawlins (born November 30, 1937) is an American academic who served as the President of the University of North Texas from May 2010 to February 2014. He is also the former President of Washington State University (WSU) and of the University of Memphis.

== Early life and education ==
Born on November 30, 1937, in Idaho, Veldon Lane Rawlins began his college education at Idaho State University and after serving a mission for the Church of Jesus Christ of Latter-day Saints in Australia he transferred to Brigham Young University about the same time he married his wife Mary Jo Love. He graduated from Brigham Young University in 1963 with a bachelor's degree in economics. In 1969, Rawlins obtained his doctoral degree in economics from the University of California, Berkeley.

== Academic career ==
In 1968, Rawlins became an economics professor at WSU. He served as the chair of the department from 1977 to 1981 and was WSU's vice provost from 1982 to 1986. He served as the Vice Chancellor for Academic Affairs of the University of Alabama for five years before assuming the presidency of Memphis State University—overseeing its renaming as the University of Memphis.

In June 2000, Rawlins returned to Washington State where he served as president until May 21, 2007. Rawlins created some controversy in the WSU community in 2002 when he tried to phase out the popular nickname "Wazzu" from usage. The change proved a firestorm of protest from students and alumni. As of the start of football season 2022, the nickname is back in popular use by WSU Athletics. He is remembered for a strategic plan developed by faculty that led to increases in research funding and to growth in the numbers of talented students choosing WSU.

Rawlins is a labor economist by training and much of his research work focused on the effects of education on earnings in people's lives. His books include "Public Service Employment: The Experience of a Decade," co-authored with Robert F. Cook and Charles F. Adams, published in 1985.

In 2006, Rawlins announced his retirement as president of WSU. He was succeeded by former University of Missouri System President Elson Floyd in late May 2007. Floyd is WSU's first African-American president. Rawlins then returned to the School of Economic Sciences faculty. He served as the interim director of The William D. Ruckelshaus Center, a regional problem-solving program of Washington State University and the University of Washington, from 2007 to 2009.

On April 16, 2010, the University of North Texas System Board of Regents appointed V. Lane Rawlins as UNT's president for the 2010–11 academic year. The appointment, effective May 14, was expected to run through summer 2011 as UNT conducted a national search for its next president. On November 9, 2010, Rawlins accepted the offer to become the university's permanent full-time President. Rawlins succeeded Phil C. Diebel who served as UNT's interim president following Gretchen Bataille's February 2010 resignation.

== Personal life ==
He and his wife Mary Jo Rawlins have three children and 11 grandchildren. As Vice Chancellor of Alabama, Rawlins also served as bishop of the Tuscaloosa Ward of the Church of Jesus Christ of Latter-day Saints (LDS Church). He was president of the North Memphis Tennessee Stake of the LDS Church.
