= Daliah Wachs =

American physician

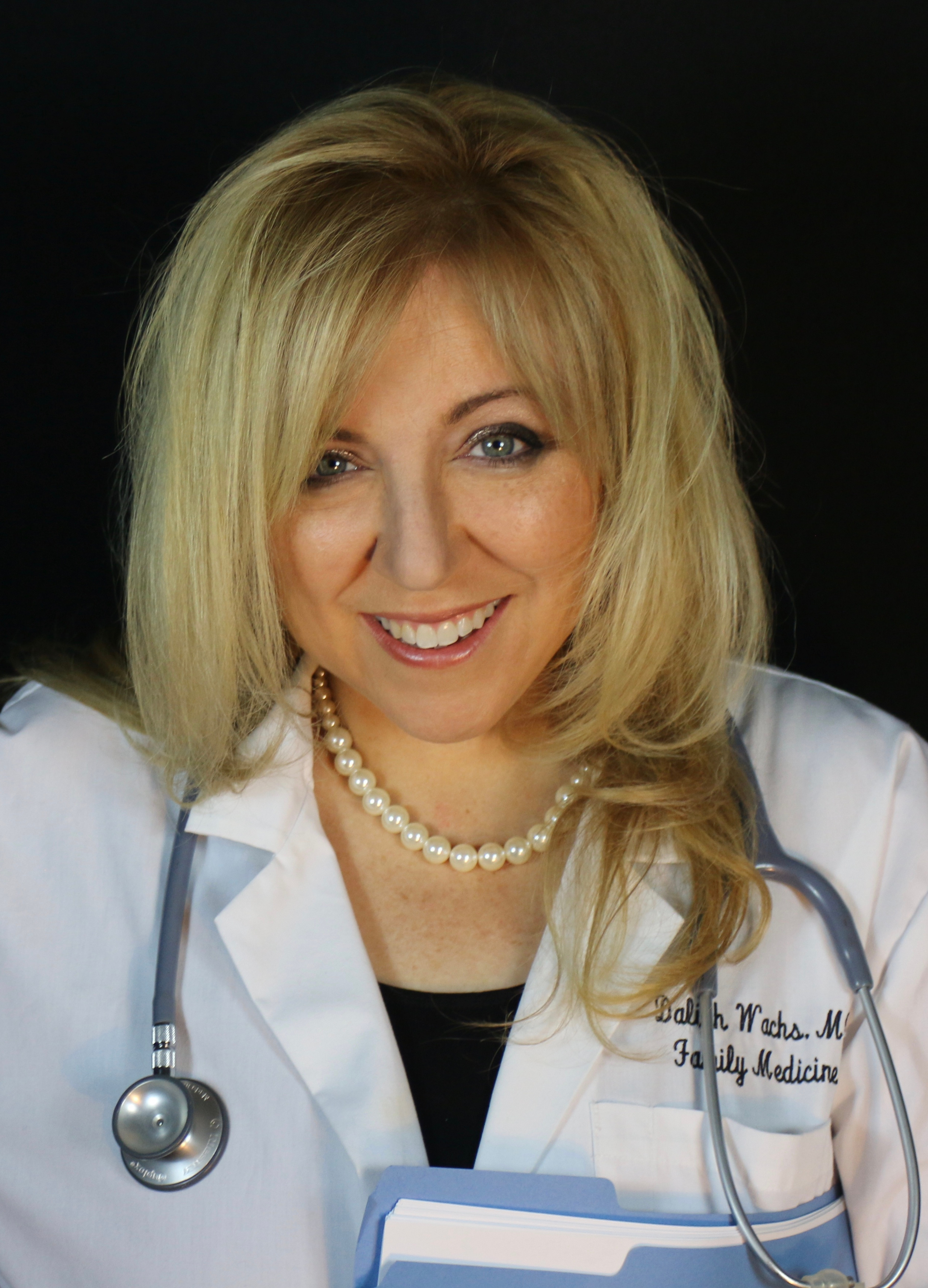
- Born: Daliah Zodieru; June 16, 1971 (age 55); Los Angeles, California, United States
- Other name: Dr. Daliah
- Occupations: Physician, television and radio personality
- Known for: Dr. Daliah radio show, television

Daliah Wachs (born Daliah Zodieru; June 16, 1971) is an American physician and radio personality, who hosts the "Dr. Daliah" radio show. As a board certified family physician, Wachs began broadcasting her own radio show on KLAV in Las Vegas, Nevada in early 2009 to provide free on-air medical during the recession. Starting in 2011, this show had been syndicated nationally in the United States by the Genesis Communications Network. During the early months of 2024 she made the switch over to Talk Media Network where the show remains nationally syndicated. She has been involved in a number of national health campaigns, including to promote blood donation and abolish daylight saving time.

== Early life and career ==
Daliah Zodieru was born in Los Angeles, California, on June 16, 1971. She grew up in Phoenix and Las Vegas with her sister and two younger brothers. She received a full academic scholarship to the University of Nevada, Las Vegas, and enrolled in the university's Honors program in the fall of 1989. After graduating Cum Laude, she went to medical school at the University of Nevada, Reno, before completing her studies at the University of California, Los Angeles (UCLA).

She married Corey Wachs in December 1996. In 1997 she transferred back to Las Vegas for residency training in Family Medicine. The following year she received her medical license in Arizona and began working as an Urgent Care Physician in Bullhead City, Arizona and an Emergency Room Physician in Lake Havasu City, Arizona. While continuing her residency training in Family Medicine, she became Chief Resident and graduated in 2000. She received her license in Nevada at that time and became Board Certified shortly thereafter. She opened her own practice in October 2000 with her husband, Corey, a chiropractic physician. In the same year she began public speaking and teaching. In 2009 she began broadcasting. She has also lectured at various medical schools and made multiple television appearances.

== Broadcasting career ==
In early 2009, Wachs started a radio show on KLAV in Las Vegas, Nevada, providing free on-air medical advice to callers during the recession. The show was picked up by KDWN in Las Vegas later that month and by KFNX in Phoenix, Arizona by late 2009. In April 2010 The Dr. Daliah Show began airing on WZFG in Fargo, North Dakota. Within two years of her premiere on air, the show had expanded to several cities, and XM Satellite began airing her show nationally in January 2011 on America's Talk Channel 158, and subsequently Channel 166.

In 2011, Wachs was named by Talkers Magazine as one of America's "250 Most Influential Hosts". Each year Talkers Magazine names her in its "Heavy Hundred" feature.

In September 2011, Genesis Communications Network began syndicating her show nationally. When Genesis Communications closed in 2024, Talk Media Network took the show and continued syndication.

Her flagship city is Las Vegas, Nevada and KEMP Broadcasting's 106.9 FM KVGQ is broadcasting her show locally as of September 1.

In 2015, Wachs helped establish Nevada Blood Donation Day, in response to blood bank shortages. In 2016, she expanded this campaign nationally, helping establish Blood Donation Days in multiple states, National Blood Donation Day, and National Blood Donation Week, in collaboration with Vitalant, American Red Cross, and blood banks throughout the United States.

In 2017, Talkers Magazine awarded her "Humanitarian of the Year."

In 2020, when legislative attempts to abolish daylight saving time stalled in multiple state legislatures, Wachs and Dr. Paul Kalekas launched a petition to Congress as part of the #SickofSpringForward and #FinishedWithFallBack campaigns, based on studies citing the health risks associated with the time changes.

Wachs has made numerous television and radio interviews and gives lectures across the United States. She is involved with several charities, including FAST4Kids (Finding Autistic Solutions for Tomorrow).

== Radio ==
- KLAV 2009
- KDWN 2009–2026
- KVGQ 2026-present
- XM Satellite America's Talk Channel 166 2010-2011
- Genesis Communications Network 2011–2024
- Talk Media Network 2024-present

== Television ==
- KTNV-TV KSNV KVVU-TV - Medical Expert
- Gigolos, Season 3 Episode 9 - receptionist
- Pawn Stars "Close But No Cigar" - seller of 1870 tooth extractor
- Pawn Stars "Rick n' Roll" - seller of 1890 Tonsillotome and Adenotome
- Pawn Stars "Dog Day Afternoon" - seller of Civil War Syphilis syringe
- Pawn Stars "Bad to the Bone" - seller of Civil War era metacarpal bone saw

== Books ==
- Wachs, Daliah; (2026) The Depressed Doctor: The Silence is Killing Us ISBN 979-8249897314
- Wachs, Daliah; Kalekas, Christian (2023) Deploying Dopamine ISBN 979-8852566669
- Wachs, Daliah; Kalekas, Kaytlin (2023) Addiction Basics ISBN 979-8376191682
- Wachs, Daliah; Kalekas, Nicholas (2019) The Ultimate Medical Student Handbook
- Wachs, Daliah; Zodieru, Kay (2019) Baby Boomer's Guide to Online Dating
- Wachs, Daliah (2019) Medical Spanish for the Healthcare Professional Pocket Guide, ISBN 978-1794577565
- Wachs, Daliah (2018) Data Gathering Prep Guide for the Boards, ISBN 978-1792834035
- Wachs, Daliah; Kalekas, Nicholas; DeVera, Ori (2019) Humanism Prep Guide For the Boards , ISBN 978-1694252449
- Wachs, Daliah; Kalekas, Nicholas; DeVera, Ori (2019) Communication and Interpersonal Skills Prep Guide For the Boards, ISBN 978-1700406071
- Wachs, Daliah; Praxidio, Denice; Nanadiego, Frances Ann; Stiewig, Miranda; Wachs, Stone; Wachs, Broc (2020) The Art of the Boo Boo, ISBN 979-8651451708
- Wachs, Daliah; Kalekas, Nicholas (2020) The Ultimate Guide to Getting Into Residency, ISBN 979-8677669910
