= Keith Whitfield =

American psychologist, educator

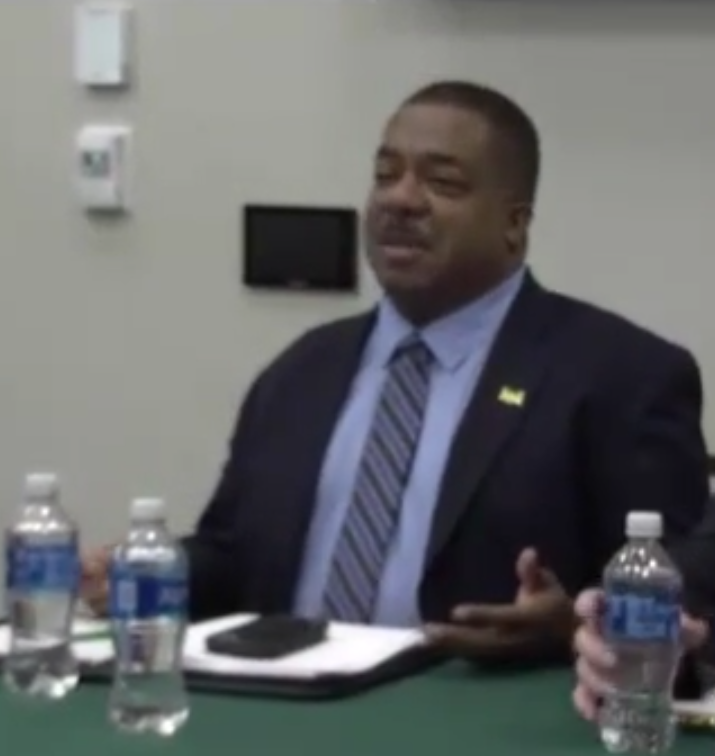
- Whitfield in 2016

11th President of the University of Nevada, Las Vegas
- In office August 24, 2020 – March 3, 2025
- Preceded by: Marta Meana (acting); Len Jessup

Personal details
- Born: Fukuoka, Japan
- Spouse: Linda Burton (m. 1994)
- Children: 4
- Education: Santa Fe College (BA); Texas Tech University (MA, PhD)

Academic background
- Thesis: Young and old adult subject performance on pictorial priming and different feature types using the visually degraded stimuli task (1989)

Academic work
- Discipline: Psychology
- Institutions: McNeese State University; Pennsylvania State University; University of North Carolina at Greensboro; Duke University; Wayne State University; University of Nevada, Las Vegas

Keith Eric Whitfield is an American psychologist, educator and gerontologist that served as the President of University of Nevada-Las Vegas from August 24, 2020 to March 3, 2025. He became the 11th and first black president of the university when he was appointed on August 24, 2020. Prior to the position, he was the Provost and Senior Vice President of Academic Affairs and a professor of psychology at Wayne State University. Whitfield has also served various leadership positions at Pennsylvania State University and Harvard University, as well as positions within the American Council on Education, Association of Governing Boards of Universities and Colleges, and Association of Public and Land-grant Universities.

Over the span of his career, Whitfield has authored or co-authored over 200 publications. He was a member of the National Institute on Aging's National Advisory Council on Aging until his retirement from the council in 2022.

== Early life and education ==
Keith Whitfield was born in Fukuoka, Japan. Whitfield's father was stationed in Japan along with the rest of his family as a lieutenant colonel of the United States Air Force. After Whitfield's father completed his service in Japan and earned his degree at the University of Colorado, Boulder, the family moved across the United States. In a 2023 interview with Mayor of Las Vegas Carolyn Goodman, Whitfield states his family moved to Colorado, Michigan, Virginia, Alabama, and Illinois before he graduated from high school. Whitfield graduated in Illinois before his family moved to New Mexico.

Whitfield got his Bachelors of Arts from the Santa Fe College in 1984, obtained his Masters of Arts from Texas Tech University in 1987, and acquired his Ph.D. from Texas Tech University in 1989. He has an expertise in psychology of cognition and healthy aging, stress and aging among African Americans, and health disparities research. Whitfield completed his post-doctoral degree in 1992 at his father's alma mater, the University of Colorado, Boulder.

== Career ==
=== Early teaching ===
Whitfield first taught in 1989 as an assistant professor at McNeese State University before teaching at Pennsylvania State University from 1993 to 2000. He would briefly teach at the University of North Carolina at Greensboro before returning to Penn State in 2002. He accepted a position as a research professor at Duke University in 2006 before working there exclusively come 2007.

=== Duke University and Wayne State University ===
In 2011, he was appointed as the vice provost for academic affairs at Duke University. While at Duke University, he held appointments as professor in the Department of Psychology and Neuroscience, research professor in the Department of Geriatric Medicine at Duke University Medical Center, and senior fellow at the Center for the Study of Aging and Human Development. He also was the co-director of the Center on Biobehavioral Health Disparities Research. He became provost and senior vice president for academic affairs at Wayne State University in 2016 before moving on to University of Nevada, Las Vegas in 2020.

=== President of the University of Nevada, Las Vegas ===
In his first address as president of University of Nevada, Las Vegas. Whitfield introduced "Top Tier 2.0" as a roadmap for the university to improve its Carnegie R1 status. During his time as president, Whitfield has shown his interest in creating additional partnerships with gaming companies for the university's research and technology park in August 2021. Whitfield is also mediating between The Boring Company and their plans to build a Loop station at the school's campus. In January 2021, Whitfield announced the university was dropping its Hey Reb! mascot after perceived ties with the Confederacy.

==== Death of Nathan Valencia ====
On November 19, 2021, Nathan Valencia, a member of the Sigma Alpha Epsilon fraternity at UNLV, was put into a coma after participating in rival fraternity Kappa Sigma's off-campus "Fight Night" event. The event was meant to raise money for Center Ring Boxing in Las Vegas. According to Zoë Bernard of Rolling Stone, the event had a history of injuries, as it was "known for landing participants in the ER with broken noses and concussions." Valencia collapsed 60 seconds after the fight had ended, in what was later determined to be a rotational injury to the head that caused a subdural hematoma. Valencia died four days later on November 23. The Nevada Athletic Commission unanimously passed "Nathan's Law" in December 2021 that would enforce emergency regulations for amateur boxing events.

President Whitfield responded to the incident by suspending Kappa Sigma from the campus. Whitfield expressed his sympathies to Valencia's family and declared that the university would be "committing all available resources to review the incident and determine how off-campus events like these can be as safe as possible." Valencia's family later sued UNLV, Kappa Sigma, and other individuals and groups in February 2022.

==== Digital President Whitfield ====
During Whitfield's 2022 State of the University Address, he announced the launch of "Digital President Whitfield", an artificial intelligence program that Whitfield stated would allow him to be available to students 24/7. In an interview with KTNV-TV, developer Russ Logan, UNLV alum and member of the AI Foundation, said that Whitfield had spent five hours recording dialogue for the program.

Resignation

After over 4 years as president of University of Nevada, Las Vegas- President Whitfield announced his resignation at the UNLV annual foundation dinner.

=== Other positions ===
Whitfield's first leadership position was as a fellow of Penn State University's Committee on Institutional Cooperation’s Academic Leadership Program from 2004 to 2005. In 2012, he was a member of the Harvard Institute for Management and Leadership in Education.

From 2016 to 2017, Whitfield was a member of the American Council on Education's Institute for new Chief Academic Officers. Whitfield was also a member of the Association of Governing Boards of Universities and Colleges Institute for Leadership & Governance in 2020. Whitfield is currently a member of the Association of Public and Land-grant Universities' Coalition of Urban Serving Universities.

== Works ==
Fighting for Your African American Marriage (2001) Jossey-Bass; ISBN 978-0787955519 written with Scott M. Stanley, Howard J. Markman, and Susan L. Blumberg

Closing the Gap: Improving the Health of Minority Elders in the New Millennium (2004) Gerontological Society of America; ISBN 978-0-929596-07-5 written with David R. Williams

The Health of Aging Hispanics: The Mexican-Origin Population (2007) Springer Press; ISBN 978-0-387-47208-9 written with Jacqueline Lowe Angel

Focus on Biobehavioral Aspects of Health in Later Life (2010) Springer Press; ISBN 978-0-8261-0614-8

Handbook of Minority Aging (2013) Springer Press; ISBN 978-0-8261-0964-4 written with Tamara A. Baker

== Personal life ==
Whitfield married his partner Linda Burton, a professor of sociology and ethnographer, in 1994. Prior to their marriage, the two had met as professors at Penn State University. They would later work together at Duke University prior to divorcing. Whitfield and Burton have had four children. Burton later became the dean of the UC Berkeley School of Social Welfare in 2019.

Academic offices
Preceded by Len Jessup	11th President of the University of Nevada, Las Vegas; 2020–2024	Incumbent
