= National Blood Donation Week =

Annual observance in the United States

In the United States, the first full week of September is designated National Blood Donation Week. Established in 2016, the week United States is to hold individual state blood donation days. This serves to assist blood banks all over the country to keep their shelves full and to raise awareness of the continual need to donate blood and blood products. September 4th of the week holds most of the states' blood donation days, and is known as National Blood Donation Day.

== Background ==
2016 was plagued with massive reports of blood bank supply shortages. The epidemic of the Zika virus was beginning, causing many who donated blood routinely to abstain from donating for at least a month. 36,000 units of blood are needed each day in the U.S. With mass casualties that occurred during the summer, including the Orlando nightclub shooting and the Dallas officer shooting, a united campaign was necessary to increase the nation's blood supply.

Syndicated radio host and physician Daliah Wachs had created Nevada Blood Donation Day in 2015 in response to local blood shortages, and partnered with United Blood Services and the American Red Cross to create a state day, proclaimed by Governor Brian Sandoval. She vowed to help expand this nationally, and in 2016 she created this campaign with United Blood Services, American Red Cross and blood banks throughout the country.

In 2016, governors in the following states proclaimed September 10 to be their state Blood Donation Day:

- Alabama
- Alaska
- Arkansas
- Connecticut
- Florida
- Georgia
- Illinois
- Indiana
- Iowa
- Louisiana
- Maine
- Maryland
- Massachusetts
- Minnesota
- Mississippi
- Missouri
- Montana
- Nebraska
- New Hampshire
- New Mexico
- North Carolina
- North Dakota
- Oklahoma
- Oregon
- Pennsylvania
- Rhode Island
- South Dakota
- Utah
- Vermont
- Washington
- Wisconsin

The first Tuesday in September has been designated Michigan Blood Donation Day.

In 2017, National Blood Donation Day fell on September 8, the Friday of National Blood Donation Week. Governors in the following states proclaimed September 8 to be their state Blood Donation Day for 2017:

- Alabama
- Arkansas
- Colorado
- Delaware
- Florida
- Georgia
- Hawaii
- Idaho
- Illinois
- Indiana
- Iowa
- Louisiana
- Maine
- Massachusetts
- Michigan
- Minnesota
- Mississippi
- Missouri
- Montana
- Nebraska
- Nevada
- New Jersey
- New Hampshire
- New Mexico
- North Carolina
- Ohio
- Oregon
- Pennsylvania
- Rhode Island
- South Carolina
- South Dakota
- Tennessee
- Utah
- Vermont
- Virginia
- Washington
- Wisconsin
- Wyoming

Arizona declared Arizona Blood Donation Week September 4–10. Maryland declared Maryland Blood Donation Day to be September 7.

In 2018, National Blood Donation Day fell on September 5, the Wednesday of National Blood Donation Week.

Governors in the following states proclaimed September 5 to be their state Blood Donation Day for 2018:

- Alabama
- Arkansas
- Colorado
- Delaware
- Florida
- Georgia
- Hawaii
- Idaho
- Illinois
- Indiana
- Iowa
- Kentucky
- Louisiana
- Maine
- Maryland
- Massachusetts
- Michigan
- Minnesota
- Mississippi
- Missouri
- Montana
- Nebraska
- Nevada
- New Hampshire
- New Jersey
- New Mexico
- North Carolina
- Ohio
- Oregon
- Pennsylvania
- Rhode Island
- South Carolina
- South Dakota
- Tennessee
- Utah
- Virginia
- Washington
- West Virginia
- Wisconsin

Arizona has proclaimed September 3-10th Arizona Blood Donation Week. Oklahoma proclaimed the month of September Blood Donation Month. Alaska proclaimed the month of July Blood Donation Month.

Governors in the following states proclaimed September 5 to be their state Blood Donation Day for 2019:

- Alabama
- Arkansas
- Connecticut
- Delaware
- Georgia
- Florida
- Idaho
- Indiana
- Iowa
- Kansas
- Maine
- Maryland
- Michigan
- Missouri
- Montana
- Nebraska
- Nevada
- New Hampshire
- New Jersey
- North Carolina
- North Dakota
- Ohio
- Oklahoma
- Pennsylvania
- Rhode Island
- South Carolina
- Tennessee
- Utah
- Vermont
- Washington
- West Virginia
- Wisconsin
- Wyoming

Arizona has proclaimed September 2-9th Arizona Blood Donation Week

For 2020, National Blood Donation Week fell on September 1–7, with National Blood Donation Day on September 4. Despite many governor's offices dealing with limited staff and resources, with many "suspending proclamations", governors in the following states proclaimed September 4 to be their state Blood Donation Day:

- Alabama
- Colorado
- Delaware
- Florida
- Hawaii
- Idaho
- Indiana
- Iowa
- Kentucky
- Louisiana
- Maine
- Maryland (September 5)
- Massachusetts
- Michigan
- Missouri
- Montana
- Nevada
- New Hampshire
- New Jersey (September 5)
- New Mexico
- North Dakota
- Oklahoma
- Pennsylvania
- Rhode Island
- South Carolina
- Tennessee
- Utah
- Vermont
- West Virginia
- Wisconsin
- Wyoming

With Arizona proclaiming September 1-7th Arizona Blood Donation Week.

In 2021, National Blood Donation Week is September 1–7, with National Blood Donation Day on September 4. Governors in the following states proclaimed September 4 to be their state Blood Donation Day:

- Alabama
- Arkansas
- Colorado
- Connecticut
- Delaware
- Florida
- Georgia
- Hawaii
- Idaho
- Illinois
- Indiana
- Iowa
- Kansas
- Kentucky
- Louisiana
- Maine
- Maryland
- Massachusetts
- Michigan
- Minnesota
- Missouri
- Mississippi
- Montana
- Nebraska
- Nevada
- New Hampshire
- New Jersey
- New Mexico
- North Carolina
- North Dakota
- Ohio
- Oklahoma
- Oregon
- Pennsylvania
- Rhode Island
- South Carolina
- South Dakota
- Tennessee
- Utah
- Vermont
- Virginia
- West Virginia
- Wisconsin
- Wyoming

Arizona has declared September 1–7 Arizona Blood Donation Week.

In 2022, National Blood Donation Week is September 1–7, with National Blood Donation Day on September 4. Governors in the following states are proclaiming September 4 to be their state Blood Donation Day:

- Arkansas
- Connecticut
- Delaware
- Florida
- Georgia
- Hawaii
- Idaho
- Illinois
- Indiana
- Iowa
- Kansas
- Kentucky
- Louisiana
- Maine
- Maryland
- Massachusetts
- Michigan
- Mississippi
- Missouri
- Montana
- Nebraska
- Nevada
- New Hampshire
- New Jersey
- New Mexico
- North Carolina
- North Dakota
- Ohio
- Oklahoma
- Oregon
- Pennsylvania
- Rhode Island
- South Carolina
- South Dakota
- Tennessee
- Utah
- Vermont
- Virginia
- Washington
- West Virginia
- Wisconsin
- Wyoming

Alaska has proclaimed Alaska Blood Donation Week during 9/1-9/7. Arizona has proclaimed Arizona Blood Donation Week during 9/1-9/7

In 2023, National Blood Donation Week is September 1–7, with National Blood Donation Day on September 4. Governors in the following states are proclaiming September 4 to be their state Blood Donation Day:

- Alabama
- Arkansas
- Colorado
- Connecticut
- Delaware
- Florida
- Georgia
- Hawaii
- Idaho
- Illinois
- Indiana
- Iowa
- Kentucky
- Louisiana
- Maine
- Massachusetts
- Michigan
- Minnesota
- Mississippi
- Missouri
- Nebraska
- Nevada
- New Hampshire
- New Jersey
- North Dakota
- Ohio
- Oklahoma
- South Carolina
- South Dakota
- Utah
- Vermont
- Virginia
- Washington
- West Virginia
- Wisconsin
- Wyoming

Arizona has proclaimed Arizona Blood Donation Week during 9/1-9/7.

Alaska declared September 4-10th Alaska Blood Donation Week.

In 2024, Governors in the following states are proclaiming September 4 to be their state Blood Donation Day:

- Alabama
- Arkansas
- Connecticut
- Delaware
- Georgia
- Hawaii
- Idaho
- Illinois
- Indiana
- Iowa
- Kentucky
- Louisiana
- Maine
- Maryland
- Massachusetts
- Michigan
- Minnesota
- Mississippi
- Montana
- Nebraska
- Nevada
- New Hampshire
- New Jersey
- New Mexico
- North Carolina
- North Dakota
- Ohio
- Oregon
- Pennsylvania
- South Carolina
- South Dakota
- Utah
- Virginia
- West Virginia
- Wisconsin
- Wyoming

Alaska, Arizona and Colorado have declared September 1–7 Blood Donation Week.

In 2025, Governors in the following states are proclaiming September 4 to be their state Blood Donation Day:

- Alabama
- Arkansas
- Colorado
- Connecticut
- Delaware
- Florida
- Georgia
- Hawai'i
- Idaho
- Illinois
- Indiana
- Kansas
- Kentucky
- Louisiana
- Maine
- Maryland
- Massachusetts
- Michigan
- Minnesota
- Mississippi
- Missouri
- Montana
- Nebraska
- Nevada
- New Hampshire
- New Jersey
- New Mexico
- New York
- North Carolina
- North Dakota
- Ohio
- Oklahoma
- Oregon
- Pennsylvania
- South Carolina
- South Dakota
- Tennessee
- Utah
- Vermont
- Virginia
- Washington
- West Virginia
- Wisconsin
- Wyoming

Alaska has declared September 1-6 Alaska Blood Donation Week. Arizona has declared September 1–7 Arizona Blood Donation Week.

In 2026, Governors in the following states are proclaiming September 4 to be their state Blood Donation Day:

- Arkansas
- Connecticut
- Delaware
- Florida
- Georgia
- Idaho
- Illinois
- Indiana
- Kentucky
- Louisiana
- Maine
- Maryland
- Michigan
- Minnesota
- Mississippi

+ Missouri

- Montana
- Nevada
- New Hampshire
- New Jersey
- New Mexico
- New York
- North Dakota
- Ohio
- Oklahoma
- Pennsylvania
- South Carolina
- South Dakota
- Utah
- Vermont
- Washington
- West Virginia
- Wisconsin
- Wyoming

with more to come.

Arizona has proclaimed Arizona Blood Donation Week during 9/1-9/7. Alaska has declared September 1-7 Alaska Blood Donation Week.
