= National Blood Donation Day =

Annual observance in the United States

National Blood Donation Day comes each year on September 4. It is an observance during National Blood Donation Week and campaign that highlights the need for blood. Multiple states throughout the United States host their own blood donation day on this same day, uniting the country in its effort to keep blood banks and hospitals stocked.

== Background ==
In 2015, syndicated radio host and family physician Daliah Wachs asked Nevada Governor Brian Sandoval to create a Nevada Blood Donation Day to help the state raise blood and awareness. Uniting with United Blood Services and the American Red Cross, Nevada Blood Donation Day held blood drives across the state, and its success prompted the campaign to continue in 2016. During this year, blood shortages were being reported nationally. Daliah approached Governors in all 50 states to help proclaim state blood donation days, and United Blood Services, the American Red Cross and blood banks across the US joined forces to help bring this national campaign to light. By September 2016, the majority of states had proclaimed state blood donation days. Indiana and Arizona proclaimed a blood donation week during this time and Alaska proclaimed the entire month of September Alaska Blood Drive Donor Challenge Month.

States with proclaimed Blood Donation Days on September 10 include: Oklahoma, Mississippi, New Mexico, Connecticut, North Dakota, North Carolina, Rhode Island, Indiana, Arkansas, Vermont, Utah, Montana, Louisiana, Alabama, Missouri, Massachusetts, Maryland, Maine, Oregon, Iowa, Florida, New Hampshire, Pennsylvania, Minnesota, South Dakota, Washington, Georgia, West Virginia, Wisconsin, Illinois, Nebraska.

The First Tuesday in September has been designated Michigan Blood Donation Day.

In 2017, National Blood Donation Day was September 8. NBDD was able to raise blood needed for recovery efforts from Hurricanes Harvey and Irma.

States who have already declared this date their Blood Donation Day include Alabama, Arkansas, Colorado, Delaware, Florida, Georgia, Hawaii, Idaho, Illinois, Indiana, Iowa, Louisiana, Maine, Massachusetts, Michigan, Minnesota, Mississippi, Missouri, Montana, Nebraska, Nevada, New Hampshire, New Jersey, New Mexico, North Carolina, Ohio, Oregon, Pennsylvania, Rhode Island, South Carolina, South Dakota, Tennessee, Utah, Vermont, Virginia, Washington, Wisconsin, Wyoming. Arizona declared Arizona Blood Donation Week September 4-10th. Maryland declared their blood donation day September 7.

In 2018, National Blood Donation Day was September 5.

States who have already declared this date their Blood Donation Day include Alabama, Arkansas, Colorado, Delaware, Florida, Georgia, Hawaii, Idaho, Illinois, Indiana, Iowa, Kentucky, Louisiana, Maine, Maryland, Massachusetts, Michigan, Minnesota, Mississippi, Missouri, Montana, Nebraska, Nevada, New Hampshire, New Jersey, New Mexico, North Carolina, Ohio, Oregon, Pennsylvania, Rhode Island, South Carolina, South Dakota, Tennessee, Utah, Vermont, Virginia, Washington, West Virginia and Wisconsin.

Arizona has proclaimed September 3–10 Arizona Blood Donation Week. Oklahoma proclaimed the month of September Blood Donation Month. Alaska proclaimed the month of July Blood Donation Month.

In 2019, National Blood Donation Day was September 5.

States who have already declared this date their Blood Donation Day include Alabama, Arkansas, Connecticut, Delaware, Georgia, Florida, Idaho, Indiana, Iowa, Kansas, Maine, Maryland, Michigan, Missouri, Montana, Nebraska, Nevada, New Hampshire, New Jersey, North Carolina, North Dakota, Ohio, Oklahoma, Pennsylvania, Rhode Island, South Carolina, Tennessee, Utah, Vermont, Washington, West Virginia, Wisconsin and Wyoming.

Arizona declared 9/2-9/9/19 Arizona Blood Donation Week

For 2020, National Blood Donation Week fell on 9/1/20-9/7/20, with National Blood Donation Day to be September 4. Despite many governor's offices dealing with limited staff and resources, with many "suspending proclamations," Governors in the following states proclaimed September 4 to be their state Blood Donation Day: Alabama, Colorado, Delaware, Florida, Hawaii, Idaho, Indiana, Iowa, Kentucky, Louisiana, Maine, Maryland (September 5), Massachusetts, Michigan, Missouri, Montana, New Hampshire, New Jersey (September 5), New Mexico, North Dakota, Oklahoma, Pennsylvania, Rhode Island, South Carolina, Tennessee, Utah, Vermont, Wisconsin and Wyoming, with Arizona proclaiming September 1-7 Arizona Blood Donation Week.

In 2021, National Blood Donation Week is September 1–7, with National Blood Donation Day September 4 or 5th. States who have declared this date as their State Blood Donation Day include: Alabama, Arkansas, Colorado, Connecticut, Delaware, Florida, Georgia, Hawaii, Idaho, Illinois, Indiana, Iowa, Kansas, Kentucky, Louisiana, Maine, Maryland, Massachusetts, Michigan, Mississippi, Missouri, Montana, Nebraska, Nevada, New Hampshire, New Jersey, New Mexico, North Carolina, North Dakota, Ohio, Oklahoma, Oregon, Pennsylvania, Rhode Island, South Carolina, South Dakota, Tennessee, Utah, Vermont, Virginia, West Virginia, Wisconsin, Wyoming.

Arizona has declared September 1–7 Arizona Blood Donation Week.

In 2022, National Blood Donation Week is September 1–7, with National Blood Donation Day on September 4. Governors in the following states are proclaiming September 4 to be their state Blood Donation Day: Arkansas, Connecticut, Delaware, Florida, Georgia, Hawaii, Idaho, Illinois, Indiana, Iowa, Kansas, Kentucky, Louisiana, Maine, Maryland, Massachusetts, Michigan, Minnesota, Mississippi, Missouri, Montana, Nebraska, Nevada, New Hampshire, New Jersey, New Mexico, North Carolina, North Dakota, Ohio, Oklahoma, Oregon, Pennsylvania, Rhode Island, South Carolina, South Dakota, Tennessee, Utah, Vermont, Virginia, Washington, West Virginia, Wisconsin and Wyoming.

Alaska has proclaimed Alaska Blood Donation Week during 9/1-9/7. Arizona has proclaimed Arizona Blood Donation Week during 9/1-9/7.

In 2023, National Blood Donation Week is September 1–7, with National Blood Donation Day on September 4. Governors in the following states are proclaiming September 4 to be their state Blood Donation Day: Alabama, Arkansas, Colorado, Connecticut, Delaware, Florida, Georgia, Hawaii, Idaho, Illinois, Indiana, Kentucky, Louisiana, Maine, Massachusetts, Michigan, Minnesota, Mississippi, Missouri, Nebraska, Nevada, New Hampshire, New Jersey, North Dakota, Ohio, Oklahoma, South Carolina, South Dakota, Utah, Vermont, Virginia, Washington, West Virginia, Wisconsin, Wyoming

Arizona has proclaimed Arizona Blood Donation Week during 9/1-9/7.

Alaska declared September 4-10th Alaska Blood Donation Week.

In 2024, Governors in the following states are proclaiming September 4 to be their state Blood Donation Day: Alabama, Arkansas, Connecticut, Delaware, Georgia, Hawaii, Idaho, Illinois, Indiana, Iowa, Kentucky, Louisiana, Maine, Maryland, Minnesota, Mississippi, Massachusetts, Michigan, Montana, Nebraska, Nevada, New Hampshire, New Jersey, New Mexico, North Carolina, North Dakota, Ohio, Oregon, Pennsylvania, South Carolina, South Dakota, Utah, Virginia, West Virginia, Wisconsin and Wyoming.

Alaska has declared September 1-7 Alaska Blood Donation Week. Arizona has declared September 1–7 Arizona Blood Donation Week. Colorado has declared September 1-7 Colorado Blood Donation Week.

In 2025, Governors in the following states are proclaiming September 4 to be their state Blood Donation Day: Alabama, Arkansas, Colorado, Connecticut, Delaware, Florida, Georgia, Hawai'i, Idaho, Illinois, Indiana, Kansas, Kentucky, Louisiana, Maine, Maryland, Massachusetts, Michigan, Minnesota, Mississippi, Missouri, Montana, Nebraska, Nevada, New Hampshire, New Jersey, New Mexico, New York, North Carolina, North Dakota, Ohio, Oklahoma, Oregon, Pennsylvania, South Carolina, South Dakota, Tennessee, Utah, Vermont, Virginia, Washington, West Virginia, Wisconsin and Wyoming.

Alaska has declared September 1-6 Alaska Blood Donation Week. Arizona has declared September 1–7 Arizona Blood Donation Week.

In 2026, Governors in the following states are proclaiming September 4 to be their state Blood Donation Day: Arkansas, Connecticut, Delaware, Florida, Georgia, Idaho, Illinois, Indiana, Kentucky, Louisiana, Maine, Maryland, Michigan, Minnesota, Mississippi, Missouri, Montana, Nevada, New Hampshire, New Jersey, New Mexico, New York, North Dakota, Ohio, Oklahoma, Oregon, Pennsylvania, South Carolina, South Dakota, Utah, Vermont, Washington, West Virginia, Wisconsin, Wyoming, with more to come.

Arizona has proclaimed Arizona Blood Donation Week during 9/1-9/7. Alaska has declared September 1-7 Alaska Blood Donation Week.
