= Len Jessup =

American academic administrator

12th President of Claremont Graduate University
- In office July 1, 2018 – June 1, 2024
- Preceded by: Jacob Adams (interim)
- Succeeded by: Tim Kirley (interim)

10th President of the University of Nevada, Las Vegas
- In office January 2015 – July 2018
- Preceded by: Neal Smatresk; Donald D. Snyder (acting)
- Succeeded by: Marta Meana (acting); Keith Whitfield

Personal details
- Children: 2
- Education: California State University, Chico (BA, MBA); University of Arizona (PhD)
- Occupation: Academic administrator

Academic background
- Thesis: The deindividuating effects of anonymity on automated group idea generation (1989)
- Doctoral advisor: Terry Connolly

Academic work
- Discipline: Business administration
- Institutions: Indiana University; Washington State University; University of Nevada, Las Vegas; Claremont Graduate University

Leonard Michael Jessup is an American academic administrator. He served as the tenth president of the University of Nevada, Las Vegas (UNLV) from 2015 to 2018, when he became the president of Claremont Graduate University.

== Early life and education ==
Born and raised in Northern California, Jessup graduated from California State University, Chico, where he earned a bachelor's degree in information and communication studies and an MBA. He earned a Ph.D. in Organizational Behavior and Management Information Systems from the University of Arizona, Tucson.

== Career ==
Jessup started his academic career as an associate professor of information systems at Indiana University's Kelley School of Business, where he held several roles including co-director of the Digital Communications Academy for the MBA Program. From 2000 to 2011, he held numerous roles at Washington State University, including as director of the Center for Entrepreneurial Studies and vice president of development for the WSU Foundation.

Jessup was a professor of entrepreneurship and innovation at the University of Arizona's Eller College of Management, where he held the Halle Chair in Leadership. He served as Eller's dean from 2011 to 2015.

Jessup served as the 10th president of the University of Nevada, Las Vegas from 2015 to 2018. He became the 12th president of Claremont Graduate University in April 2018. In March 2024, announced he plans to step down at the end of the academic year on June 30, 2024. Interim president formally replaced Jessup on June 2, 2024.

In 2018 he was chosen as the recipient of the CEO Award by the Council for Advancement and Support of Education, District VII.

Academic offices
Preceded by Neal Smatresk	10th President of the University of Nevada, Las Vegas; 2015–2018	Succeeded by Keith Whitfield
Preceded by Deborah A. Freund	12th President of Claremont Graduate University; 2018-2024	Succeeded by Tim Kirley (interim)
