= Mass media in Las Vegas =

The following is a list of print, television, and radio media serving the Las Vegas Valley. As of 2022, Las Vegas is ranked as the fortieth-largest television market in the United States, with 870,240 homes in Southern Nevada and parts of northwestern Arizona, according to Nielsen Media Research.

== Print ==
- Las Vegas CityLife
- Las Vegas Review-Journal
- Las Vegas Sun
- Las Vegas Weekly
- Desert Companion

== Television ==
The following is a list of full-power stations serving the Las Vegas Valley; for full listings, please see the Las Vegas TV template.

Channel	Call Sign	Network	Subchannel(s)	Owner
3.1	KSNV	NBC	3.2 Estrella TV; 3.3 Charge! 3.4 Stadium	Sinclair Broadcast Group
5.1	KVVU	Fox	5.2 Sports Independent; 5.3 Ion Mystery; 5.4 Dabl	Gray Television
8.1	KLAS	CBS	8.2 Rewind TV; 8.3 GetTV; 8.4 Shop LC	Nexstar Media Group
10.1	KLVX	PBS	10.2 Create; 10.3 PBS Kids; 10.4 World Channel	Clark County School District
13.1	KTNV	ABC	13.2 Laff; 13.3 Grit; 13.4 HSN; 13.5 KTNV Plus	E.W. Scripps Company
15.1	KINC	Univision	15.2 LATV; 15.3 Twist; 15.4 True Crime; 15.5 Quest; 15.6 Fuego 92.7	Entravision Communications
21.1	KHSV	MeTV	21.2 Heroes & Icons; 21.3 Circle; 21.4 Antenna TV; 21.5 Start TV; 21.6 Catchy Comedy; 21.7 MeTV Toons	Howard Stirk Holdings
33.1	KVCW	The CW	33.2 MyNetworkTV; 33.3 TBD; 33.4 This TV; 33.5 Stadium	Sinclair Broadcast Group
34.1	KMCC	Independent	34.2 Ion Television; 34.3 Court TV; 34.4 Scripps News; 34.5 Defy TV; 34.6 Bounce TV; 34.7 Shop LC; 34.8 HSN	E.W. Scripps Company
39.1	KBLR	Telemundo	39.2 TeleXitos; 39.3 Lx; 39.4 Cozi TV; 39.5 Oxygen	NBCUniversal Television Stations

== Radio ==
=== AM ===
Frequency	Call Sign	Format
670	KMZQ	News/Talk
790	KBET	Urban contemporary
840	KXNT	News/Talk
870	KLSQ	Sports (Univision Deportes)
920	KRLV	Sports (NBC Sports)
970	KNIH	Religious
1060	KKVV	Religious
1100	KWWN	Sports (ESPN)
1230	KLAV	Talk
1280	KQLL	Oldies
1340	KKGK	Sports (Fox Sports)
1400	KSHP	Sports/Shopping
1460	KENO	Sports (Spanish)

=== FM ===
Frequency	Call Sign	Format
88.1	KCEP	Urban Contemporary
88.5	KVID	Christian
88.9	KNPR	News/Talk (NPR)
89.3	KAER	Christian
89.7	KCNV	Classical
90.5	KSOS	Christian
91.1	KVKL	Christian
91.5	KUNV	Jazz
92.3	KOMP	Active Rock
92.7	KRRN	Spanish Adult Contemporary
93.1	KVGK	Adult Hits
94.1	KMXB	Hot Adult Contemporary
95.1	KNYE	Oldies
95.5	KWNR	Country
95.9	KACP	Country
96.3	KKLZ	Classic Hits
97.1	KXPT	Classic Rock
97.5	KVEG	Rhythmic Contemporary
98.5	KLUC	Top 40/CHR
99.3	KRGT	Spanish Adult Contemporary
99.7	KHYZ	Dance
100.1	KHWG	News/Talk
100.5	KXQQ	Rhythmic Hot AC
101.9	KWID	Spanish Adult Contemporary
102.7	KCYE	Country
103.1	KURR	Top 40/CHR
103.5	KISF	Regional Mexican
104.3	KVPH	Christian
104.7	KJUL	Oldies
105.1	KQRT	Regional Mexican
105.7	KOAS	Urban Adult Contemporary
106.5	KSNE	Adult Contemporary
107.5	KXTE	Alternative Rock
107.9	KVGS	Hot Adult Contemporary
