= Nevada Sports Network =

Sports-broadcasting group

Nevada Sports Network (NSN) is an events and sports-broadcasting group based out of Las Vegas, Nevada. It was founded in 1996 by Alex Shelton and is known for its production of many NCAA bowl game, NCAA Football and Basketball Games of the Week, Nevada Sports Broadcasting of NIAA Football and Basketball Championships as well as branded radio and television shows with Mountain West Conference and live Sporting Events producing radio and television broadcasts.

As a sports-broadcasting group, Nevada Sports Network acquires the rights for live collegiate and pro teams to be broadcast on the Las Vegas Sports Network stations: KWWN (ESPN Radio), KENO (ESPN Deportes Radio), KKGK (Fox Sports Radio 98.9 FM and 1340 AM), and KRLV (NBC Sports Radio), making them one of the largest rights holders for collegiate athletics nationwide.

Nevada Sports Network owned the Las Vegas Broadcasting Rights for the Seattle Seahawks, Denver Broncos, Tennessee Titans and Arizona Cardinals. NCAA - Washington, Hawaii, Washington State, USC, Arizona, Arizona State, Oregon, BYU, Kansas, Utah, Colorado, Oklahoma. MLB - Oakland A's, Chicago Cubs, Anaheim Angels, New York Yankees. NHL - Los Angeles Kings - being the only radio broadcasts of the NHL in Las Vegas. Their decision to program stations with radio broadcasts of live play by play allowed NSN to partner with other Regional NCAA Event Broadcasters, as they air play by play broadcasts against sports radio stations that air no live games.

NSN has produced the Mountain West Basketball Tournament for National radio, as well as producing their "This Week in the Mountain West Conference" Nationally distributed weekly radio show. The NSN National Radio Network was the second largest national radio network in the country only behind Westwood One for many years.

Nevada Sports Network produced live television and radio broadcasts of Nevada High School State Football and Basketball Championships. As a radio network, NSN developed a 10 Radio Station network to broadcast these tournaments. The television broadcasts carried in Reno and Las Vegas were the only statewide broadcasts of radio and television for these events. NSN worked with Television and Radio talent from the Reno area, along with Nevada talent. The Nevada Sports Network website worked with Rivals Network. FOX (KVVU) 5 developed a High School Broadcast with Dave Hall and Alex Shelton that aired for 2 years in the Las Vegas market. NSN is the national abbreviation for Nevada Sports Network and is national resource for coverage of Nevada events for National Radio Networks, Top 50 Radio markets. Their Radio Show - Sports Line aired in Las Vegas for 7 years working with KSHP 1400 General Manager Brett Grant, Fred Weinberg of KRLV 1340 and Lotus Radio in Reno and Las Vegas and Lee Pete - the legendary Las Vegas Sports Broadcaster. NSN is a partner with the NIAA and has worked with UNLV and UNR regarding radio and television broadcasts, network growth, sponsorships.

Additionally as an events manager NSN oversees local events. The largest and most well known of these events is the Las Vegas International Beer Festival. Nevada Sports Network developed the Nevada Sports Network Basketball Classic

NSN, in conjunction with Grace Media Unlimited, produced the Dollar General Bowl each year until 2015. In previous seasons they also produced the Music City Bowl, the Sun Bowl, the Heart of Dallas Bowl, the Military Bowl, the Humanitarian Bowl, and others.

Until 2014 NSN produced a national game of the week for SiriusXM and for other interested stations. Among the broadcasts produced were every edition of the WAC Football Championships. However other national radio companies (Touchdown Radio, Sports USA, Compass Media) have taken many of NSN's broadcasts opportunities away causing the company to get out of the weekly national broadcast business and focus solely on programming the rights for the Las Vegas sports radio stations.

With bowl ties going back to 1996, NSN was the longest bowl production company for college football, a title now held by ESPN Radio. Before Nevada Sports Network Westwood One held that title until they gave up rights to the Cotton Bowl and Gator Bowl to ESPN Radio. ESPN Radio obtained Radio Broadcasts leveraging their Television Broadcast Deals. The over growth of college bowl games and growth of ESPN Owned Games, rights fees increased to amounts that did not justify rights fees and ESPN Radio Stations slowed their broadcasting of live sporting events.
