= KRLV =

KRLV may refer to:

- KRLV (AM), a radio station (920 AM) licensed to serve Las Vegas, Nevada, United States
- KKGK, a radio station (1340 AM) licensed to serve Las Vegas, Nevada, which held the call sign KRLV from 1995 to 2020
- KSNE-FM, a radio station (106.5 FM) licensed to serve Las Vegas, Nevada, which held the call sign KRLV from 1987 to 1994
