= KLAV =

Coordinates: 36°12′47″N 115°09′45″W

- Las Vegas, Nevada; United States
- Broadcast area: Las Vegas metropolitan area
- Frequency: 1230 kHz
- Branding: VSiN Las Vegas 1230 The Game

Programming
- Format: Sports
- Affiliations: Vegas Stats & Information Network; Sports USA Radio Network; Henderson Silver Knights; Vegas Knight Hawks

Ownership
- Owner: Lotus Communications; (Lotus Broadcasting Corp.)
- Sister stations: KENO, KKGK, KOMP, KRLV, KWID, KWWN, KXPT

History
- First air date: 1948 (as KLAS)
- Former call signs: KLAS (1948–1964); KLAV (1964-1985); KEZD (1985-1987)
- Call sign meaning: Las Vegas

Technical information
- Licensing authority: FCC
- Facility ID: 70690
- Class: C
- Power: 900 watts day 1,000 watts night

Links
- Public license information: Public file; LMS
- Webcast: Listen live
- Website: lvsportsnetwork.com

KLAV (1230 AM) is a commercial radio station located in Las Vegas, Nevada. Owned by Lotus Communications, the station airs a betting-focused all-sports radio format featuring programming from the locally based Vegas Stats & Information Network. Its studios are located in the unincorporated community of Spring Valley in Clark County and its transmitter is located in North Las Vegas.

== History ==
KLAV ran a middle-of-the-road (MOR) format until the late 1970s. In early 1979, at the peak of the disco craze, the station endeared itself "Disco 1-2-3 KLAV". KLAV evolved into a Top 40 format in the early 1980 under then program director Ted Ziegenbusch. This Top 40 era was notable for its inclusion of R&B/Urban music, which its rival, KLUC (98.5 FM), largely avoided at the time, making KLAV one of the first commercial stations in Las Vegas to play rap/hip-hop music. In 1985 the station briefly switched to an easy-listening format and changed its call letters to KEZD but returned to its traditional KLAV name and time-brokered format by 1987.

KLAV previously broadcast from atop the former Bob Stupak's Vegas World Hotel & Casino until its closure in 2000. The station broadcast in a few locations around the Las Vegas Valley but eventually settled down at its current West Sahara Avenue location.

In August 2012, KLAV was sold by Hemisphere Broadcasting to Lotus Broadcasting. In April 2015, KLAV flipped to a Regional Mexican format as La Caliente.

In April 2017, while announcing that it had acquired the radio rights to the Vegas Golden Knights, Lotus announced that KLAV's FM transmitter K255CT would switch to a simulcast of KRLV.

In 2019, KLAV relaunched as "La Ranchera 1230 AM", emphasizing ranchero music. The ranchero music format, a genre of traditional Mexican music, was relatively short-lived on KLAV; by August 2020, the station changed again, adopting the sports betting-oriented format, "VSiN Las Vegas 1230 The Game." The same month, it was announced that KLAV would carry the games of the Golden Knights' American Hockey League affiliate, the Henderson Silver Knights. In February 2025, the station rebranded as VSiN Las Vegas 1230 The Game to place a larger emphasis on its affiliation.
