= KFMS =

KFMS may refer to:

- KFMS-LD, a low-power television station (channel 31, virtual 47) licensed to serve Sacramento, California, United States
- KZNS-FM, a radio station (97.5 FM) licensed to serve Coalville, Utah, which held the call sign KFMS from 2005 to 2006
- KWID, a radio station (101.9 FM) licensed to serve Las Vegas, Nevada, which held the call sign KFMS from 1974 to 1980 and KFMS-FM from 1980 to 2003
