= Vegas Golden Knights =

National Hockey League team in Paradise, Nevada

- 2026–27 Vegas Golden Knights season
- Conference: Western
- Division: Pacific
- Founded: 2017
- History: Vegas Golden Knights; 2017–present
- Home arena: T-Mobile Arena
- City: Paradise, Nevada
- Team colors: Steel gray, gold, red, black
- Media: KMCC (TV); KKGK (Fox Sports 1340/98.9) (English radio); KENO (Deportes Vegas 1460) (Spanish radio)
- Owner(s): Black Knight Sports and Entertainment (Bill Foley) (majority); Adrienne Maloof (minority)
- General manager: Kelly McCrimmon
- Head coach: Ryan Craig
- Captain: Mark Stone
- Minor league affiliates: Henderson Silver Knights (AHL); Tahoe Knight Monsters (ECHL)
- Stanley Cups: 1 (2022–23)
- Conference championships: 3 (2017–18, 2022–23, 2025–26)
- Presidents' Trophies: 0
- Division championships: 5 (2017–18, 2019–20, 2022–23, 2024–25, 2025–26)
- Official website: nhl.com/goldenknights

The Vegas Golden Knights are a professional ice hockey team based in the Las Vegas metropolitan area. The Golden Knights compete in the National Hockey League (NHL) as a member of the Pacific Division in the Western Conference. Founded in 2017 as an expansion team, the team is the first major sports franchise to represent Las Vegas. The franchise is primarily owned by Black Knight Sports and Entertainment, a consortium led by Bill Foley, with Adrienne Maloof holding a minority stake. Their home games are played at T-Mobile Arena on the Las Vegas Strip in Paradise, Nevada.

One of the few expansion franchises to experience immediate success in North American professional sports, the Golden Knights have qualified for the Stanley Cup playoffs in eight of their first nine seasons and reached the Stanley Cup Final in their first season. Their 13 playoff wins en route to the 2018 Stanley Cup Final are the most for a team during their inaugural postseason run. In 2023, the club returned to the Stanley Cup Final and won their first championship in their sixth season of existence, becoming the fastest expansion team to win the Stanley Cup in NHL history.

== History ==
=== Background and establishment ===
The NHL has had a presence in Las Vegas since 1991; that year, the city hosted the first outdoor game between two NHL teams – a preseason exhibition between the Los Angeles Kings and New York Rangers outside Caesars Palace. The Kings would subsequently organize "Frozen Fury" – a series of annual preseason games in Las Vegas against the Colorado Avalanche. The NHL Awards ceremonies have been held in Las Vegas since 2009. In 2009, the media speculated about a plan involving Hollywood producer Jerry Bruckheimer to move the Phoenix Coyotes to Nevada.

Rumors of a Las Vegas expansion team surfaced again in August 2014, pointing to a new indoor arena on the Strip (built as a joint venture between Anschutz Entertainment Group, owners of the Los Angeles Kings, and MGM Resorts International) as the potential home arena, although these rumors were denied by the league. In November 2014, an unconfirmed report stated that the league had selected billionaire businessman Bill Foley and the Maloof family (former owners of the National Basketball Association's Sacramento Kings, and founders of the Palms Casino Resort) to lead the ownership group for a Las Vegas expansion team. In December 2014, the NHL's board of governors decided to allow Foley to hold a season ticket drive to gauge interest in a Las Vegas team, though league commissioner Gary Bettman also asked the media not to "make more out of this than it is". The season ticket drive began in February 2015, with interested parties placing ten percent deposits for the 2016–17 season. The drive drew 5,000 deposits in its first day and a half, and reached its goal of 10,000 deposits by April 2015.

In June 2015, the league officially opened the window for prospective owners to bid on expansion teams. By this point, Foley had secured more than 13,200 season-ticket deposits. Two expansion applications were submitted: Foley's application for a Las Vegas team, and a bid from Quebecor to revive the Quebec Nordiques at a new arena in Quebec City. Both Las Vegas and Quebec were invited to move into Phase II of the league expansion bid in August 2015, which involved providing additional details about the Las Vegas market to the league. Later in the same month, both bids proceeded to Phase III, which involved a review of ownership financials.

At the league owners' meeting on June 22, 2016, in Las Vegas, the Las Vegas expansion bid was approved by a unanimous vote, with play to begin in the 2017–18 NHL season. The team became the first major professional sports franchise to be based in Las Vegas, and the first NHL expansion team since 2000. Foley committed to pay the league's $500 million expansion fee and began the process of hiring the team's principal staff and determining its official identity. Foley announced that former Washington Capitals general manager George McPhee would be the franchise's first general manager. Murray Craven, who had acted as an adviser to Foley for two years, was named senior vice president on August 18, and lauded as the team's "master builder" by Sports Illustrated the following January. On November 22, the name was revealed as the Vegas Golden Knights.

=== Start of operations and the inaugural season (2017–2018) ===
On March 1, 2017, the team completed its expansion fee payments and filings, making it eligible to formally begin operations such as free agent acquisition, and participation in league meetings. Five days later, the Golden Knights made their first personnel move by signing Reid Duke to a three-year, entry-level contract.

The team announced inaugural head coach Gerard Gallant on April 13, 2017. Over the next two months, the Golden Knights developed their farm system, announcing affiliations with the Chicago Wolves of the American Hockey League and the Quad City Mallards of the ECHL.

The team participated in the 2017 NHL expansion draft on June 21, 2017, selecting an available player from all 30 teams in the NHL. The draft picks were announced at T-Mobile Arena during the NHL Awards ceremony. Some notable selections included goaltender Marc-André Fleury from the Pittsburgh Penguins and winger James Neal from the Nashville Predators. At the 2017 NHL entry draft, Cody Glass was the first player selected by the Golden Knights. The Golden Knights played their first game on October 6 against the Dallas Stars with Neal scoring the franchise's first two goals en route to their first victory.

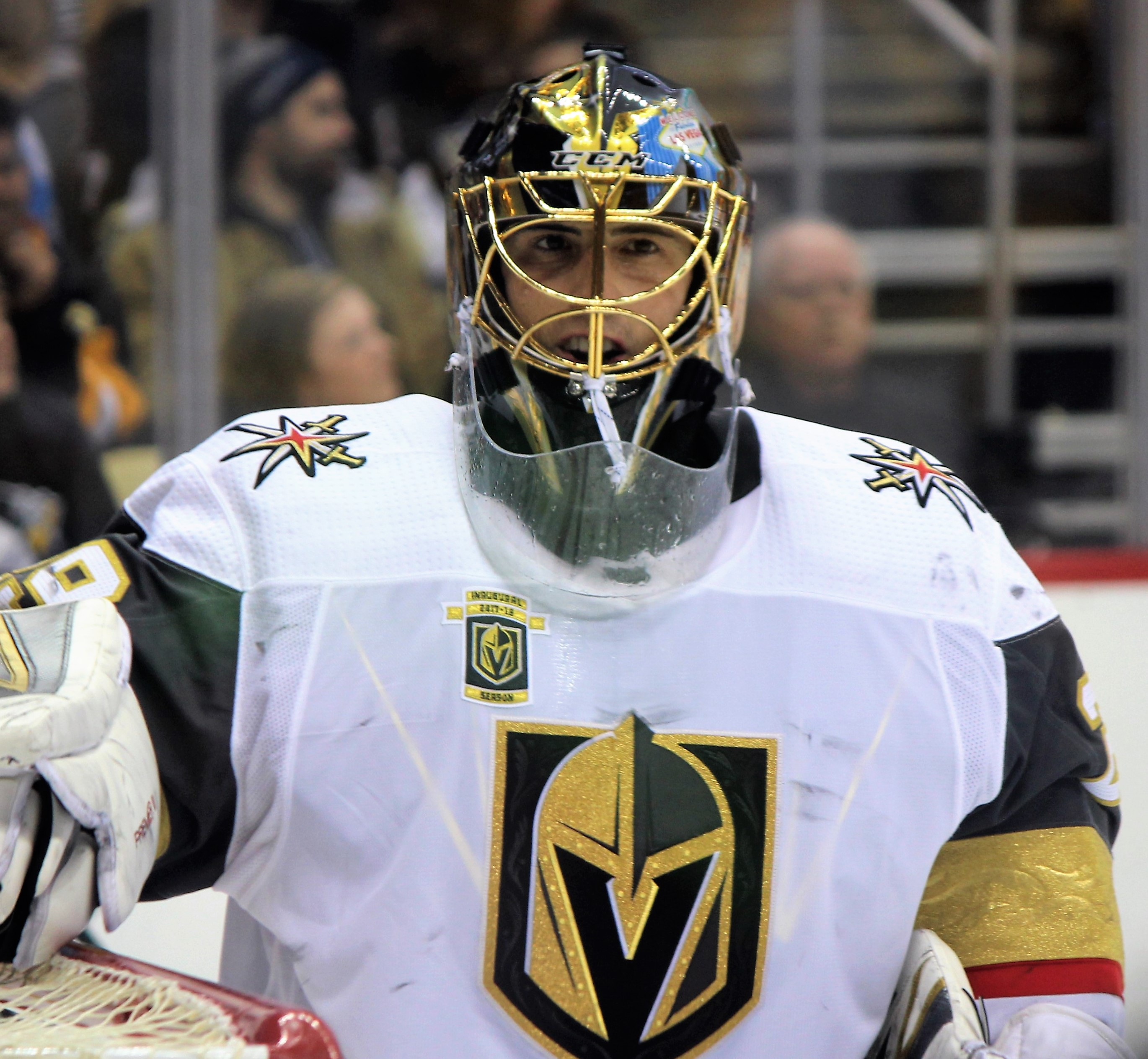
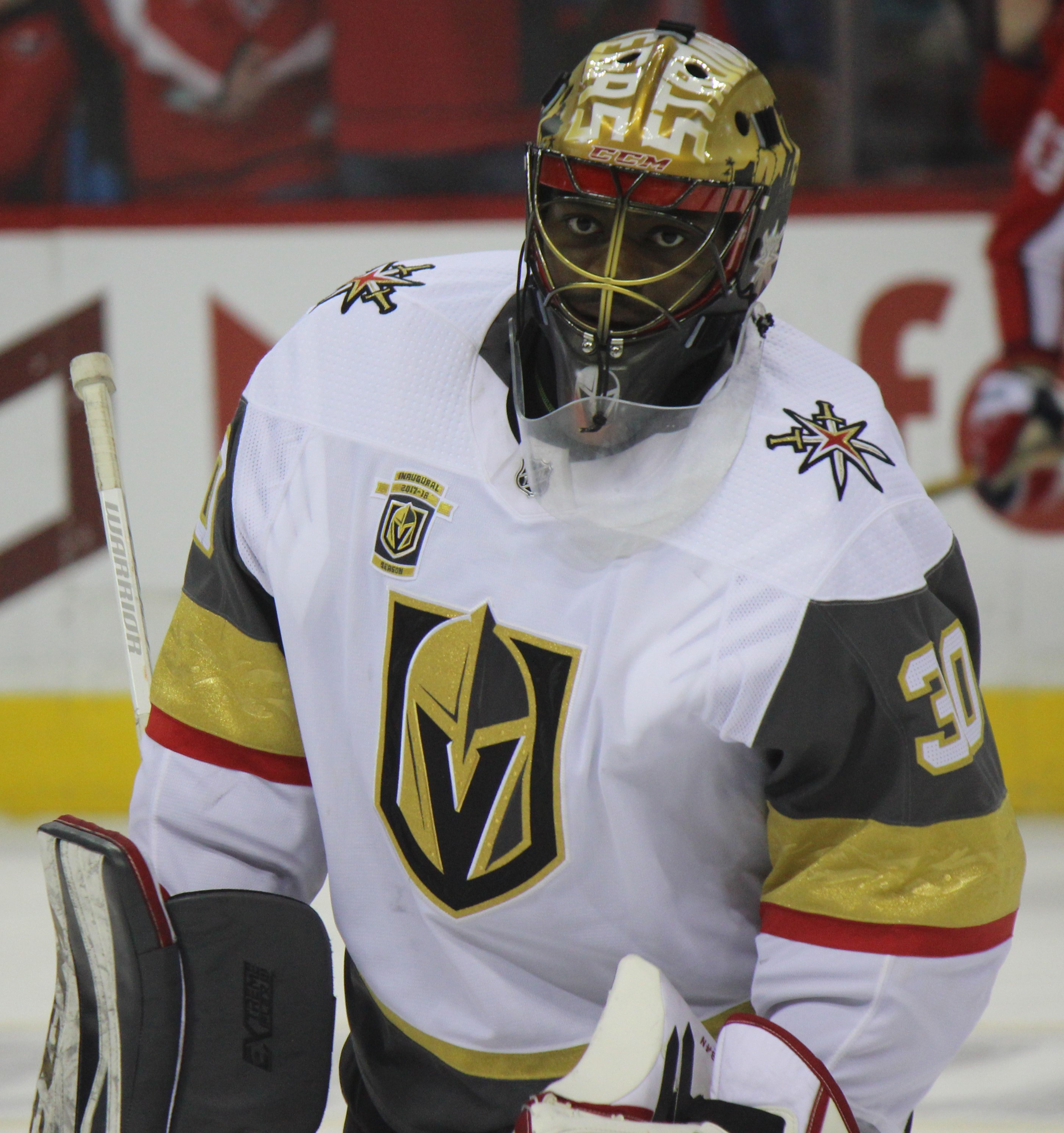
Marc-André Fleury (left) and Malcolm Subban (right), prior to games against the Washington Capitals and Pittsburgh Penguins in February 2018, respectively. During October 2017, the Golden Knights were forced to start four different goaltenders due to injuries.

The team's inaugural home game at T-Mobile Arena was played on October 10, 2017, hosting the Arizona Coyotes as the second game of a home-and-home series. In the aftermath of the October 1 mass shooting, the pre-game ceremonies honored the victims of the attack, and the team issued an appeal for donations to its charitable arm. With their 5–2 win, the Golden Knights increased their unbeaten streak to start the season to 3–0, an NHL record for an expansion team. The Golden Knights are the first team in NHL history to start their inaugural season winning eight of their first nine games. During their tenth game, goaltender Oscar Dansk was injured becoming the third Golden Knights' goaltender to be injured during the season after losing starters Fleury and the recently acquired Malcolm Subban, forcing the team to start a fourth goaltender in 11 games with Maxime Lagacé.

Fifteen games into the season, Vadim Shipachyov became the first player to retire from the NHL as a Golden Knight when he decided to return to the Kontinental Hockey League. In December, the Golden Knights set another NHL expansion team record of six straight wins, a record they previously missed when they lost their tenth game of the season, and established a new NHL record with eight straight wins. On February 1, 2018, the Golden Knights set the expansion team record for wins in a debut season with 34 wins after only 50 games, and then on February 21, 2018, set a record for most points by an expansion team in the inaugural season with 84. Clinching a berth for the 2018 playoffs on March 26, the Golden Knights became the first team since the Edmonton Oilers and Hartford Whalers in the 1979–80 season to make the playoffs in their inaugural season in the league. On March 31, the Golden Knights clinched the Pacific Division title, becoming the first true expansion team in the four major sports to win its division in its inaugural season (not counting all-expansion divisions, as was the case in the 1967–68 season). Vegas' inaugural season was widely considered the most successful of any North American expansion team, with much attention given to the breakout seasons of their expansion draft selections, dubbed the "Golden Misfits."

On April 11, the franchise won its first playoff game in a 1–0 victory over the Los Angeles Kings in the first game of the series. Six days later on April 17, the franchise earned their first playoff series win against the Kings, winning the fourth game by a 1–0 score, which also became their first playoff series sweep. The Golden Knights became the first team in NHL history to sweep their first playoff series in their inaugural season. On May 6, 2018, the Golden Knights defeated the San Jose Sharks four-games-to-two, becoming the third team in NHL history to win multiple playoff series in their inaugural season, and advanced to the conference finals. On May 20, Vegas defeated the Winnipeg Jets to win the conference finals in five games, becoming the third NHL team to advance to the Stanley Cup Final in its inaugural season, after the Toronto Arenas in 1918 and the St. Louis Blues in 1968. The Golden Knights were defeated in the Stanley Cup Final by the Washington Capitals in five games; despite this loss, the team won 13 postseason games that year, breaking the record for the most wins by an expansion team in their first playoff appearance.

=== Continued contention and first Stanley Cup championship (2018–present) ===
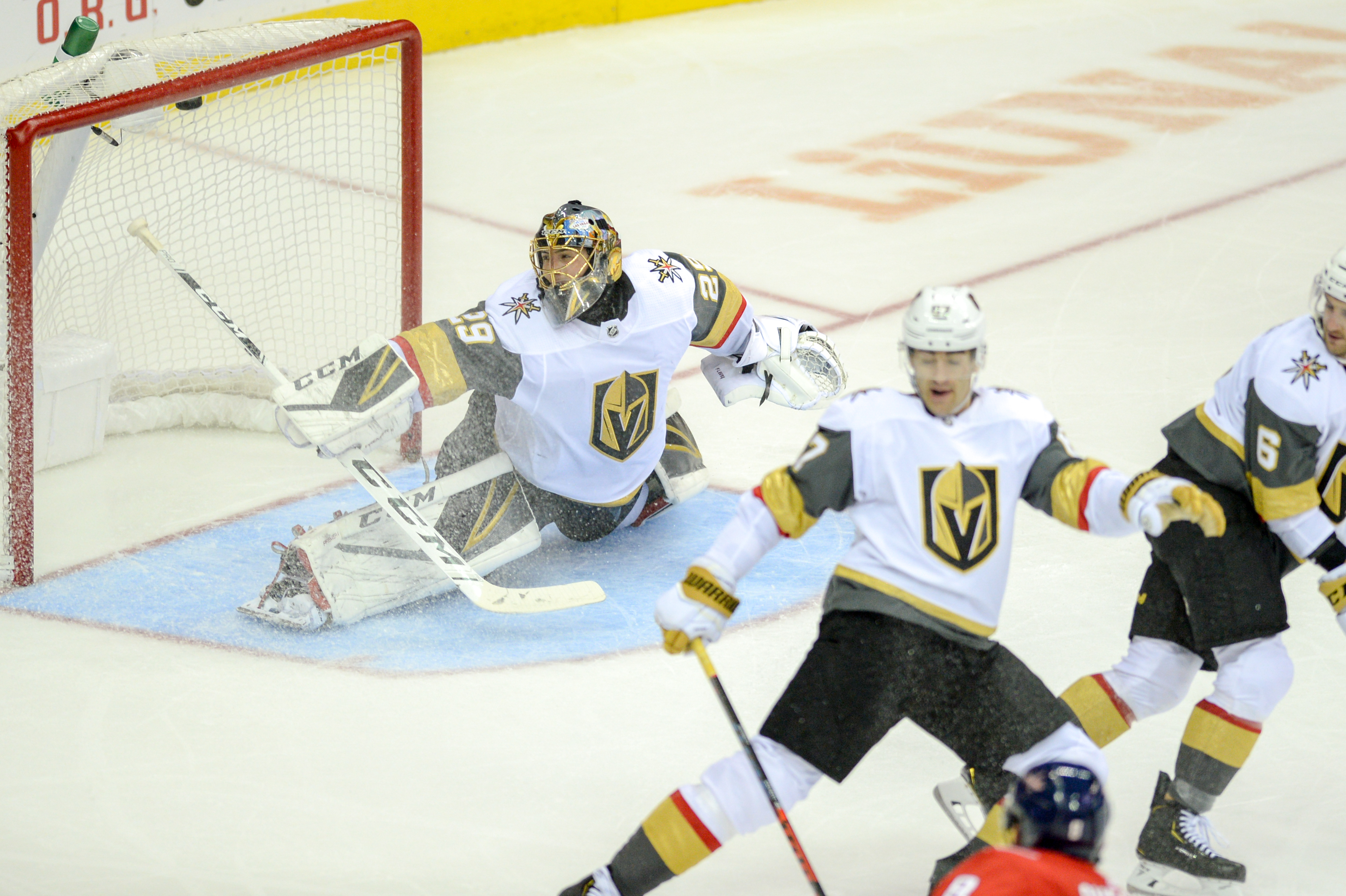
Fleury, Max Pacioretty, and Colin Miller during a game against the Washington Capitals in October 2018.

Prior to the 2018–19 season, the Golden Knights acquired winger Max Pacioretty from the Montreal Canadiens and signed free-agent center Paul Stastny, filling the roster holes left by the free-agency departures of James Neal and David Perron. Additionally, Vegas acquired future captain Mark Stone from the Ottawa Senators at the trade deadline, subsequently signing him to an eight-year extension. Despite dropping to 93 standings points from the prior season's 109, the Golden Knights returned to the playoffs as the third seed in the Pacific Division. They ultimately suffered their first-ever first-round elimination, losing to the San Jose Sharks in seven games after leading the series 3 games to 1. Game seven was particularly notable; after taking a 3–0 lead into the third period, Cody Eakin delivered a cross-check to Sharks captain Joe Pavelski, resulting in a controversial 5-minute major penalty call that saw the Sharks score four goals and take a 4–3 lead. The Sharks would eventually win the game, after a late game-tying goal by Jonathan Marchessault for Vegas followed by Barclay Goodrow's series winner in overtime.

In May 2019, Vegas modified their front-office staff, with the promotions of George McPhee from general manager to president of hockey operations and assistant general manager Kelly McCrimmon to general manager. During the remainder of the off-season and 2019–20 season, the Golden Knights' roster experienced considerable turnover. In June, original Golden Knights Erik Haula and Colin Miller were traded to the Carolina Hurricanes and Buffalo Sabres, respectively, with recently signed KHL standout Nikita Gusev also sent to the New Jersey Devils. The team additionally acquired center Chandler Stephenson from the Washington Capitals in early December 2019. After an up-and-down start resulting in a 24–19–6 record and capped by a four-game losing streak, the team fired head coach Gallant, replacing him with recently fired former Sharks head coach Peter DeBoer on January 15, 2020.

During the following month in the lead-up to the trade deadline, Vegas further acquired defenseman Alec Martinez from the Los Angeles Kings, forward Nick Cousins from Montreal, and goaltender Robin Lehner from the Chicago Blackhawks, as well as trading original Golden Knights Cody Eakin and Malcolm Subban to the Winnipeg Jets and Chicago. Due to the COVID-19 pandemic, the NHL regular season was suspended on March 12, 2020, and officially concluded on May 26; Vegas, holding the 3rd-best points percentage in the Western Conference, automatically qualified for the restructured playoffs, playing in a round-robin to determine the top four seeds in the Western playoff bracket. After sweeping the round-robin round over the Dallas Stars, St. Louis Blues, and Colorado Avalanche, Vegas earned the first seed, proceeding to defeat Chicago in the first round in five games. In the second round, Vegas defeated the Vancouver Canucks in seven games, despite once again having previously led the series 3–1. Their playoff run would end in the conference finals, however, as the Golden Knights lost to Dallas in five games.

Prior to the shortened 2020–21 season, Mark Stone was named the first captain in franchise history. Additionally, alternate captain and team leader Deryk Engelland retired, stepping into a front-office role with the team. The Golden Knights further overhauled the roster in the off-season, notably signing defenseman Alex Pietrangelo to a seven-year contract, as well as trading Paul Stastny to Winnipeg and original Golden Knight Nate Schmidt to Vancouver. The shortened schedule saw a temporary realignment where teams only played against their own division in the regular season, with Vegas being placed in a new eight-team West Division. The Golden Knights ultimately finished second in both the division and league; despite being tied in points with the Colorado Avalanche, the Avalanche had five more regulation wins than Vegas. In first round of the playoffs, Vegas was forced to a game seven for the third consecutive year after leading 3–1, but defeated the Minnesota Wild thanks in part to a hat trick from trade-deadline acquisition Mattias Janmark.

In the second round, the Golden Knights defeated the Avalanche in six games despite initially going down 2–0; however, Vegas' playoff run would again end one round short of the Stanley Cup Final, as the Golden Knights were then upset by the Montreal Canadiens in six games in the Stanley Cup semifinals. Goaltender Marc-André Fleury was named the winner of the Vezina Trophy as the league's best goaltender at season's end, with he and Lehner also sharing a William M. Jennings Trophy win for allowing the fewest goals against of any team.

The 2021 off-season began with a swap of former first-round picks, as Vegas acquired Nolan Patrick from the Philadelphia Flyers as part of a three-team trade that sent Cody Glass to the Nashville Predators. Vegas also acquired forward Brett Howden from the New York Rangers, later sending Ryan Reaves to the Rangers in a separate trade. Most controversially, Fleury was traded to the Chicago Blackhawks for minor-league forward Mikael Hakkarainen due to salary-cap constraints. Vegas later traded for Ottawa Senators forward Evgenii Dadonov, as well as signing Laurent Brossoit to back up Robin Lehner. Approximately one month after the start of the 2021–22 season, Vegas acquired star center Jack Eichel from the Buffalo Sabres, in exchange for Alex Tuch, Peyton Krebs, and two draft picks. During the course of the season, the Golden Knights suffered a rash of injuries across the roster, with a total of 478 man-games lost; owing to this, Ben Hutton, Michael Amadio, Adam Brooks, and Derrick Pouliot were signed or claimed off waivers for depth, while rookies such as Jake Leschyshyn, Jonas Rondbjerg, and Logan Thompson received significant playing time. The trade deadline also witnessed a voided trade, as an attempt to send Dadonov to the Anaheim Ducks fell through due to non-compliance with his no-trade clause. Due in part to the injuries, as well as lackluster play, the Golden Knights ultimately missed the playoffs for the first time in team history, finishing three points behind the Nashville Predators in the Western Conference.

==== 2022–2023: Stanley Cup champions ====
During the 2022 off-season, Vegas fired head coach DeBoer, replacing him with former Boston Bruins head coach Bruce Cassidy one month later.

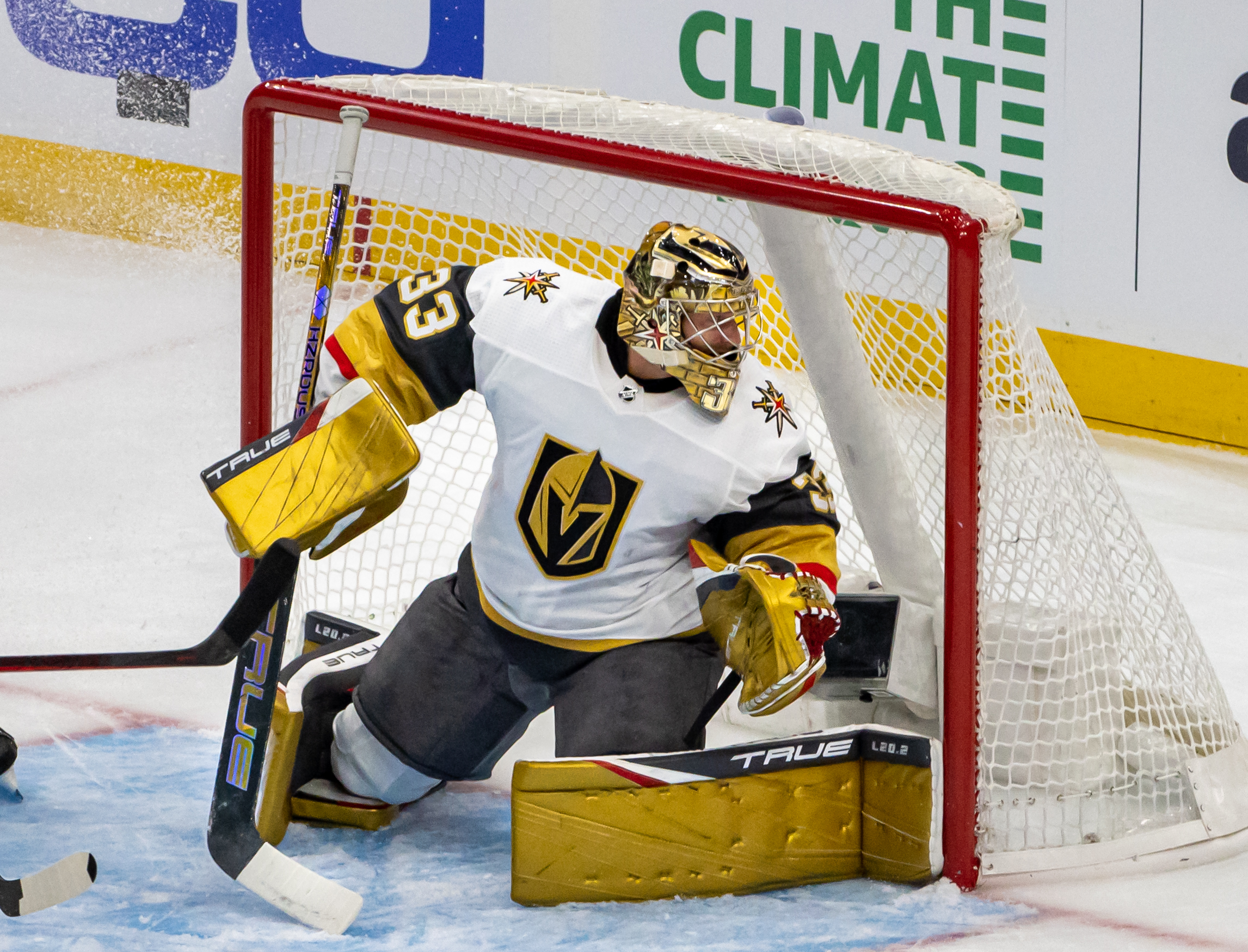
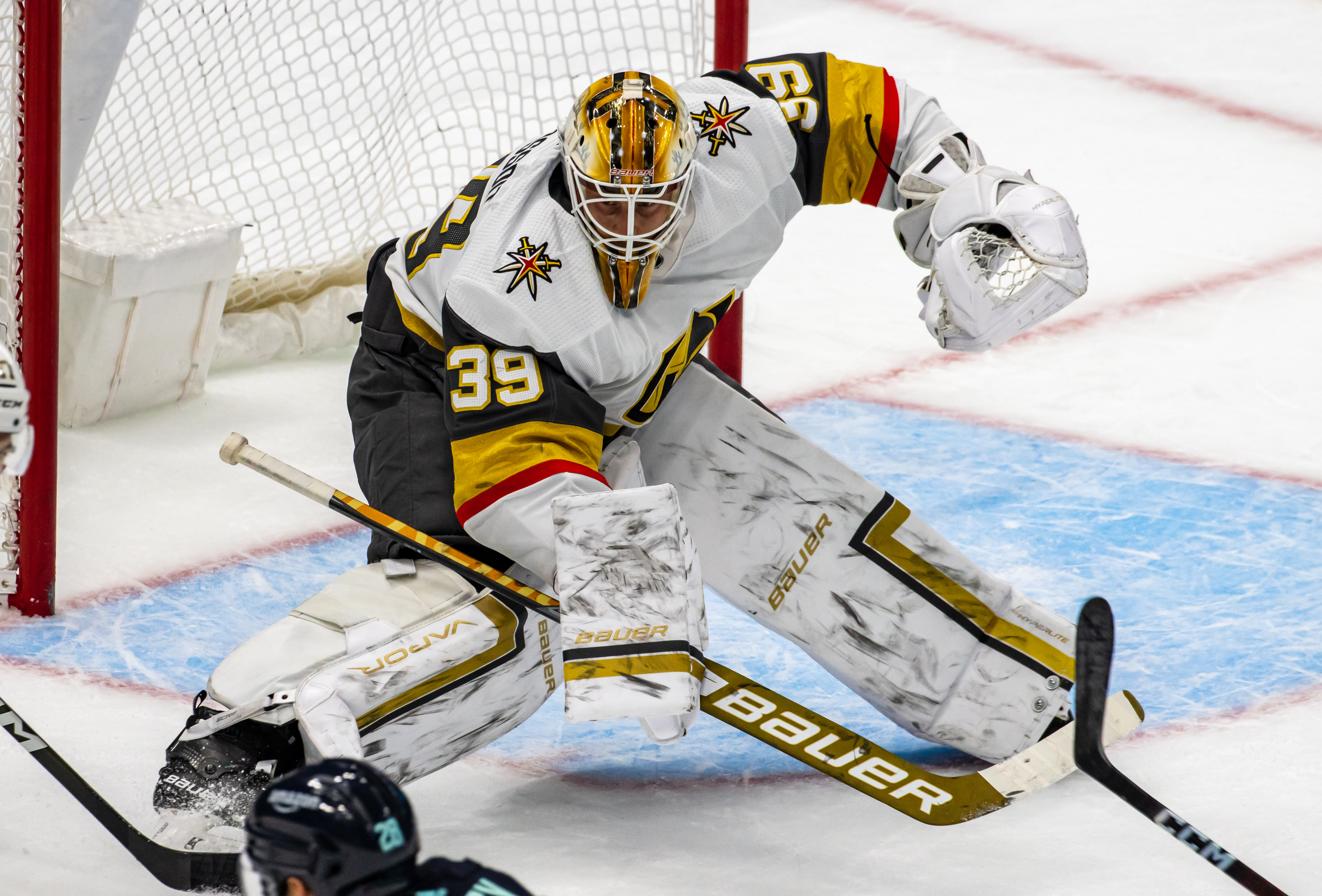
Adin Hill (left) and Laurent Brossoit (right) during games against the Seattle Kraken in October 2022 and April 2023, respectively. The two would combine to start all 22 of Vegas' 2023 playoff games, with Brossoit starting the first eight and Hill the final 14, including the entire 2023 Stanley Cup Final.

Besides the hiring of Cassidy, the Golden Knights experienced comparatively few changes during the off-season; most notably, Mattias Janmark left in free agency, while Max Pacioretty and Dylan Coghlan were traded to the Carolina Hurricanes, and Evgenii Dadonov was traded to the Montreal Canadiens. The team also signed veteran forward Phil Kessel to a one-year contract. Change did occur in the goaltender's net, however; with starting goaltender Robin Lehner ruled out for the season due to hip surgery, and backup Laurent Brossoit set to miss time due to surgery of his own, the team turned to rookie Logan Thompson as starter. Additionally, the Golden Knights acquired Adin Hill from the San Jose Sharks to serve as Thompson's backup.

The Golden Knights began the 2022–23 season leading the Pacific Division, losing just two games during the month of October, and holding a 17–6–1 record at the end of November. However, the team slowed down afterwards, posting a combined 12–12–3 record through December and January, including a 1–5–2 slump in the eight games prior to the All-Star break. The Golden Knights recovered after the break, however; despite a variety of injuries sidelining Thompson, Hill, and a returning Brossoit for varying periods, the Golden Knights went on a tear through the final three months of the season, finishing out 22–4–5. In addition, the team acquired forwards Ivan Barbashev and Teddy Blueger at the trade deadline for scoring depth, as well as longtime Los Angeles Kings goaltender Jonathan Quick to address the multitude of goaltender injuries. During this period, the Golden Knights also became the first team to win four consecutive games with four different starting goaltenders, as rookie Jiri Patera became the fifth goaltender to start for Vegas during the season. After clinching a playoff berth on March 30, 2023, Vegas defeated the Seattle Kraken in their final regular season game on April 13, narrowly beating out the Edmonton Oilers for both the Pacific Division championship and first seed in the Western Conference.

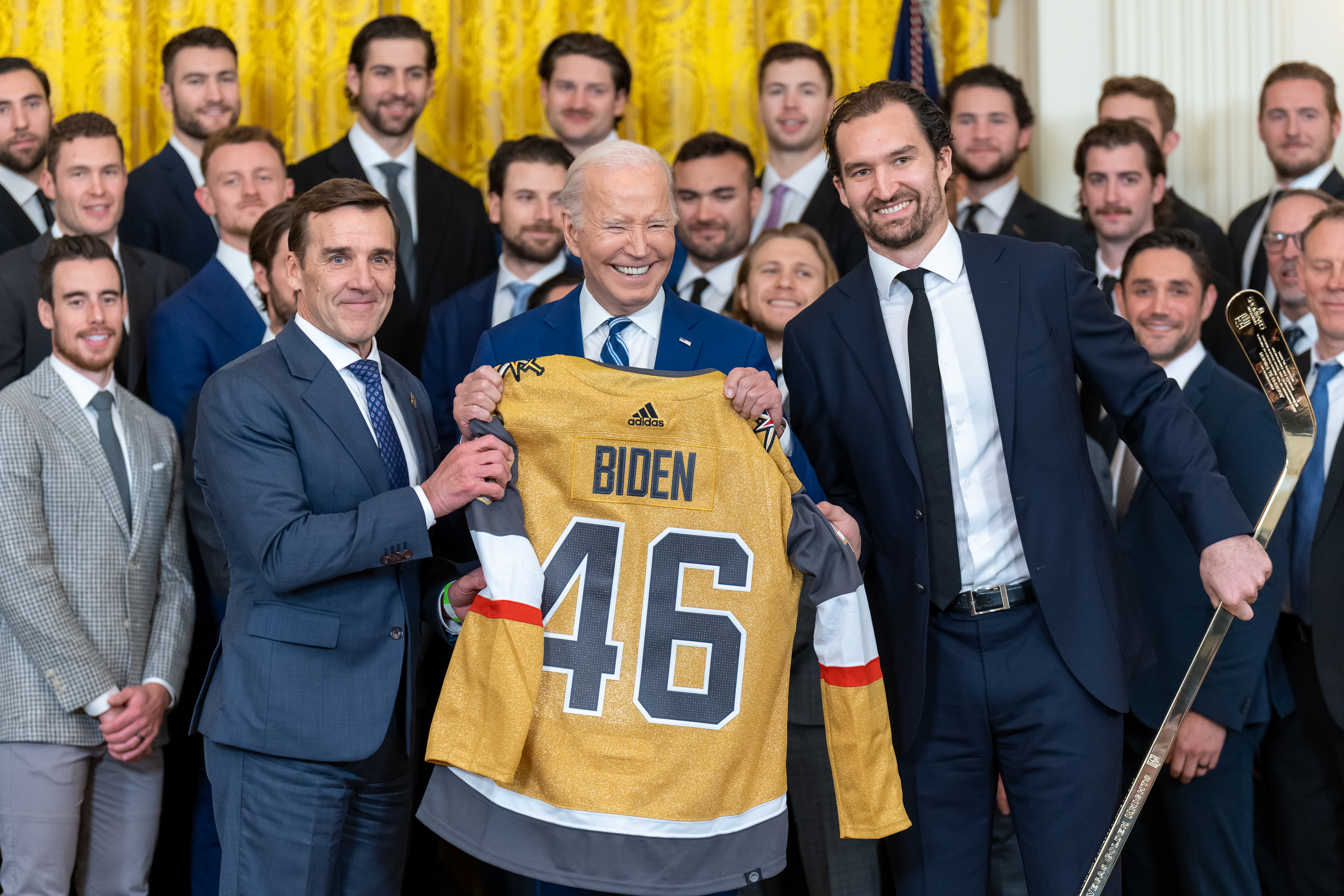
The Golden Knights with U.S. President Joe Biden at the White House following their Stanley Cup victory in 2023.

In the playoffs, the Golden Knights faced off against the Winnipeg Jets in the first round, in a rematch of the 2018 conference finals; after a 5–1 loss in game 1, the Golden Knights won four straight to win the series in five games. Proceeding to the second round, Vegas defeated the division rival Oilers in six games, despite an injury to Brossoit in game 3 necessitating Hill taking over as goaltender. The conference finals saw a rematch of the 2020 series, as the Golden Knights faced the Dallas Stars once again; avenging their prior loss, Vegas won the series and their second Western Conference championship in six games, despite Dallas forcing two additional games after Vegas led the series 3–0. The Golden Knights ultimately faced the Florida Panthers in the Stanley Cup Final. Vegas won the Cup Final in five games, including a dominant 9–3 victory in game 5, to win their first Stanley Cup championship, as well as Las Vegas' first championship in any of the "big 4" North American sports leagues. Jonathan Marchessault, who led the team in playoff goals, would win the Conn Smythe Trophy as the most valuable player during the playoffs. Additionally, the Golden Knights fulfilled the prediction of owner Bill Foley, who had previously stated the franchise's goals were "playoffs in three, cup in six," with the 2022–23 season being the franchise's sixth. The Knights became the youngest team to win the Stanley Cup since the NHL's first major expansion in 1967, beating the previous record set by the Philadelphia Flyers, who won the Cup in 1974, their seventh season.

The Golden Knights entered the 2023–24 season retaining the majority of their Cup-winning roster, agreeing to extensions with Barbashev, Hill, and Brayden Pachal several weeks after the Stanley Cup Final. However, Blueger, Brossoit, and Quick departed in free agency, while original Golden Knight Reilly Smith was traded to the Pittsburgh Penguins, ending his six-year tenure with the franchise. For the second consecutive season, Vegas started the season at the top of the Pacific Division, going 11–0–1 over their first twelve games, with no regulation losses in October; their seven-game season-opening win streak set the record for the longest season-opening winning streak of any defending champion, surpassing the record of five previously set by the 1985–86 Edmonton Oilers and 1920–21 Ottawa Senators.

The team again faltered in the months afterward, though, with another rash of injuries between November and February resulting in the NHL debuts of Lukas Cormier, Mason Morelli, and 2020 first-round pick Brendan Brisson. January also saw the Golden Knights compete in the 2024 Winter Classic on New Year's Day, facing off against Seattle at T-Mobile Park in their second outdoor game; Vegas ultimately lost 3–0, becoming the first team to be shut out in the Winter Classic. Business changes also occurred mid-season, as the Maloof family sold the bulk of their shares to majority owner Foley in early January, with only Adrienne Maloof maintaining a minority stake. After a short winning period in late January that featured Hill's return from a two-month injury, as well as Pachal's loss to the Calgary Flames on waivers, the team celebrated its first 1,000th-game ceremony on February 12, 2024, as defenseman Alex Pietrangelo played his 1,000th NHL game. However, the team slumped heavily after the All-Star break, recording a 2–8–1 record between February 12 and March 7, endangering their playoff chances. In an attempt to bolster the roster, the Golden Knights acquired Noah Hanifin, Tomáš Hertl, and Anthony Mantha at the trade deadline, later signing Hanifin to an eight-year extension to begin the following season; this was followed by a 6–0–1 surge through late March, culminating in the Golden Knights clinching a playoff berth on April 12. As the second wild card, Vegas again faced off against the Central Division champion Dallas Stars in a rematch of the past year's conference finals; despite winning the first two games of the series, the Golden Knights would ultimately lose the series in seven games, ending their title defense in the first round.

In March 2026, with eight games left in the season, Cassidy was fired and replaced with John Tortorella. Tortorella would go 7–0–1 to finish the season, and the Golden Knights would win their fifth division title and clinch a playoff spot. The Golden Knights beat the Utah Mammoth and the Anaheim Ducks in the first two rounds of the Stanley Cup playoffs, respectively. They would then upset the Presidents' Trophy-winning Colorado Avalanche by sweeping them, and reached the Stanley Cup Final for the third time in franchise history. In the Stanley Cup Final, Vegas played against the Carolina Hurricanes. The Golden Knights win game 1 and lost game 2, heading to Vegas with the series tied 1–1. In game 3, they would score four goals in 6:26 in the second period, including a hat trick from Mitch Marner, to go up 4–0. However, they would give away the lead in the third period, sending the game into overtime, in which Shea Theodore scored the game winner in double overtime, and the Golden Knights took a 2–1 series lead. However, they would lose the next three games to lose the Cup Final series 4–2 to the Hurricanes.

== Team identity ==
=== Logos, colors, and uniforms ===
The team's secondary logo

The team's primary logo is a barbute helmet, superimposed on a black and gold shield, with a V-shaped opening. The secondary logo is two crossing swords behind a red star, designed to resemble the star found on the landmark Welcome to Fabulous Las Vegas sign.

The team's primary color is steel gray, which is said to represent "strength and durability". The other team colors are gold, red (found in the Las Vegas skyline and at Red Rock Canyon), and black (for "power and intensity").

The first uniforms in Golden Knights team history were unveiled publicly on June 20, 2017. Home uniforms are steel gray with black, gold and red stripes, while road uniforms are white with steel gray, gold and red stripes. Shoulders feature the alternate swords logo. On October 2, 2020, the Golden Knights introduced a gold alternate uniform, essentially a palette swap of the road uniforms with gold and white switching places. On February 11, 2021, the Golden Knights debuted shiny gold helmets as an alternate to their home gray helmets. Starting with the 2022–23 season, the gold uniforms became the primary, while the gray uniforms became the alternate.

The Golden Knights also released a special "Reverse Retro" alternate uniform. Because the Golden Knights did not have a long NHL history to draw from, their retro design was inspired in part by Manon Rhéaume, the first female NHL player, who played for the now-defunct International Hockey League's Las Vegas Thunder. The uniform employs a red base and features the "crossing swords" logo in front. Their second "Reverse Retro" uniform was a faux-back design from 1995, featuring a black base and a diagonal "VEGAS" wordmark inspired by various vintage hotels in the strip. The wordmark also has a glow-in-the-dark feature when shown in a dark background.

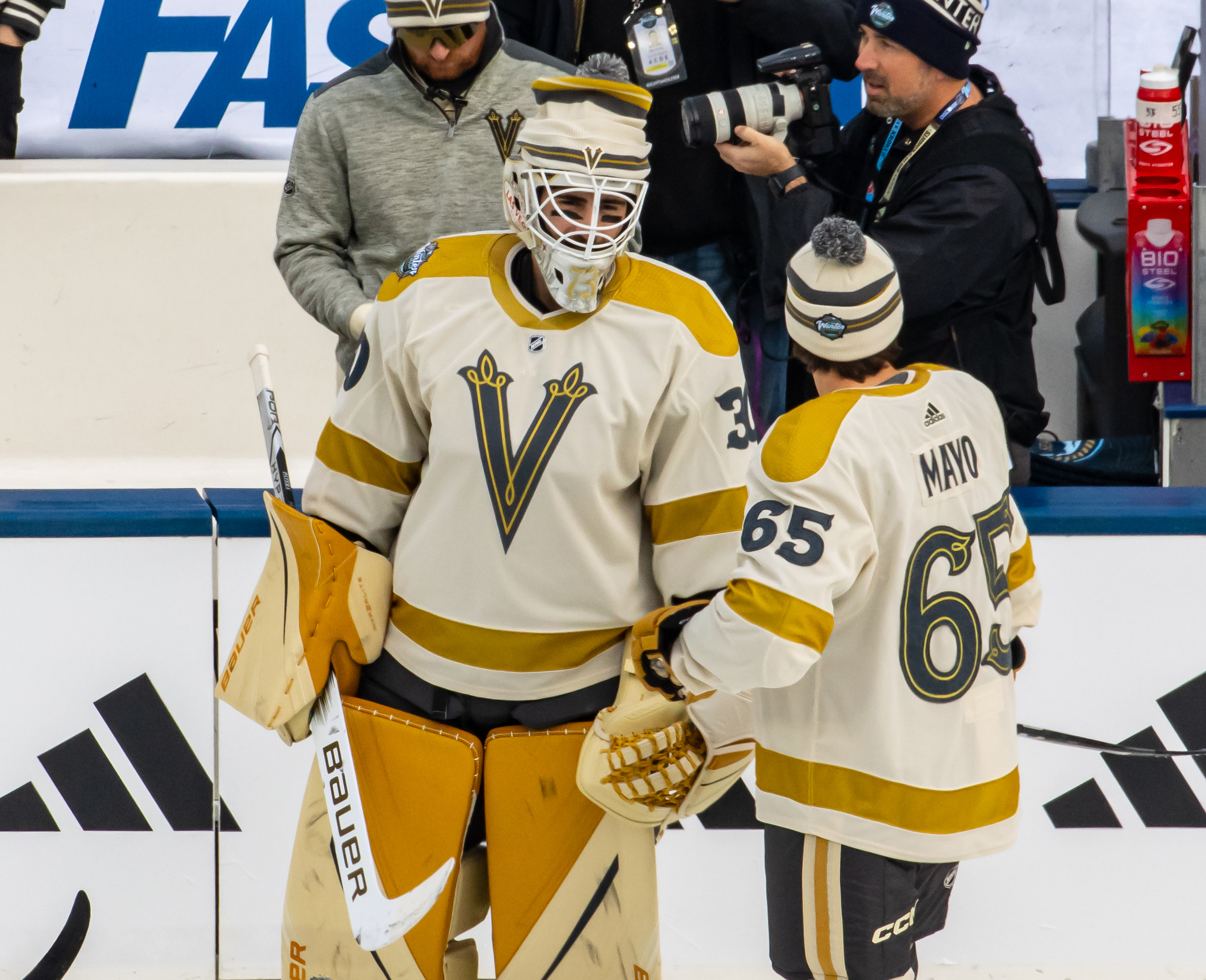
Jiri Patera (left) and Dysin Mayo (right) wearing the Golden Knights' faux-back uniforms prior to the 2024 Winter Classic.

For the 2024 Winter Classic, the Golden Knights wore faux-back 1917 vintage white uniforms with heritage gold stripes, gray pants and helmets. The crest is a stylized gray "V" with petal accents and gold trim. Prior to its official unveiling on November 22, 2023, the uniform was accidentally leaked to the public four days earlier during an All Elite Wrestling event, with AEW host Renee Paquette wearing the uniform during the Full Gear pay-per-view.

=== Name ===
The team's name includes "Knights" as a homage to the Black Knights of the United States Military Academy, Foley's alma mater, and because knights were, according to Foley, "the epitome of the warrior class". Foley had hoped to name his team the Black Knights, but dropped that plan after encountering resistance from federal officials. Foley was unable to call the team the "Vegas Knights" because the London Knights owned the "Knights" name in Canada.

"Golden" was included in the name because gold is, as Foley stated, the "No. 1 precious metal", and because Nevada is the largest gold-producing state in the country. "Las" was omitted from the team's name because, according to Foley, residents tend to refer to the city simply as "Vegas", and because a four-word name would have been too long.

The United States Army opposed the team's trademark registration because their exhibition parachute team uses the same nickname; they dropped their opposition after negotiating a trademark coexistence agreement with the team. An objection was also raised by the College of Saint Rose because its sports teams use the same name; the Vegas team's initial trademark application was denied as a result, but was later approved on appeal. The team did clear the name with Clarkson University, which also uses the name Golden Knights.

=== Mascot ===
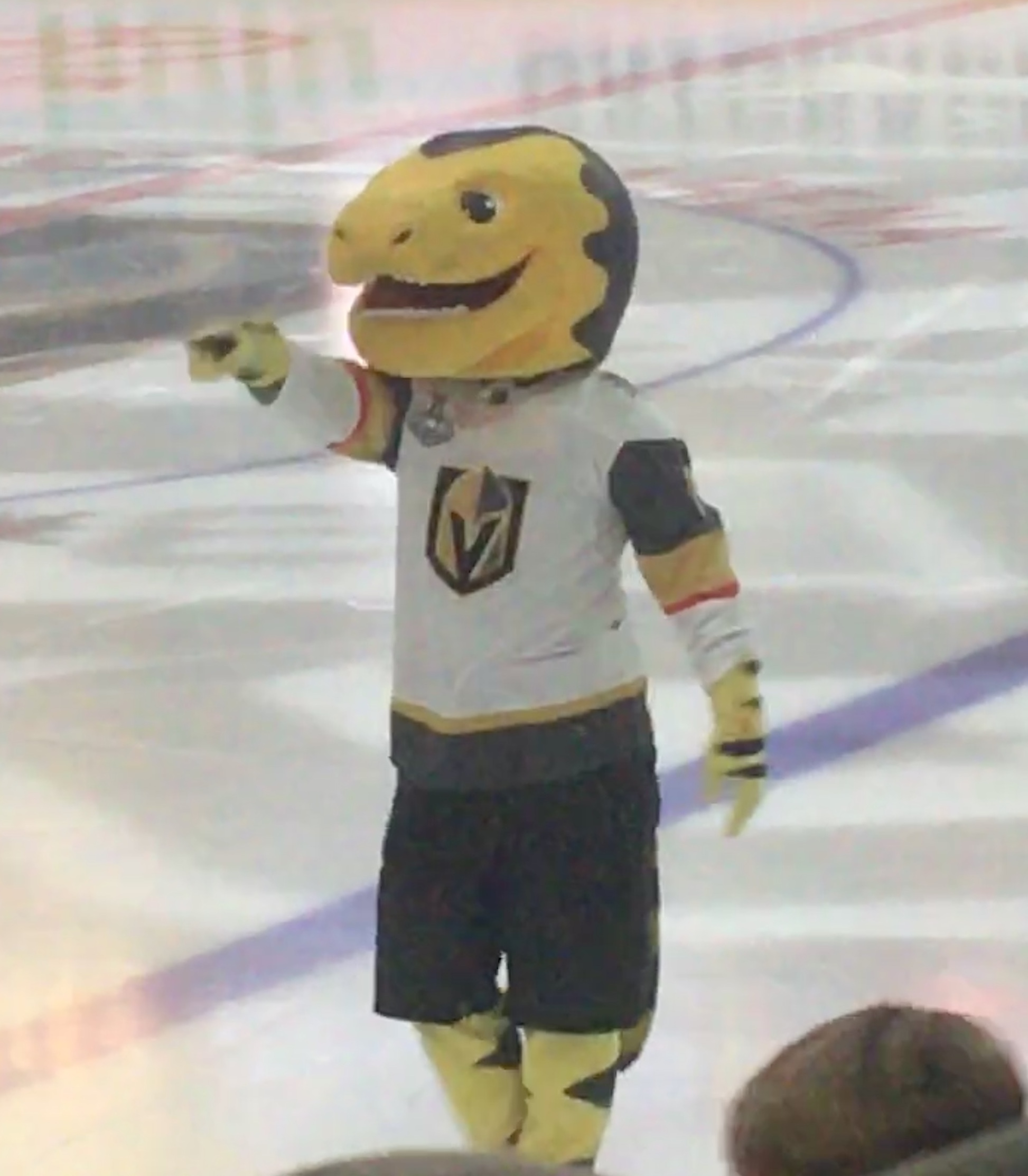
The team's mascot is a Gila monster named Chance.

The Golden Knights' mascot is a Gila monster named Chance. He was unveiled at the team's second home game on October 13, 2017. The team opted against using a knight for a mascot because it found that knight mascots used by other teams were not very child-friendly. However, the team's pre-game show often includes a skating knight.

== Team information ==
=== Broadcasting ===
==== Television ====
The Golden Knights' designated television market includes Nevada, Idaho, Montana, and Arizona, and formerly included Utah and Wyoming. In May 2023, amid plans by Warner Bros. Discovery to exit the RSN business, the Golden Knights announced an agreement with the E.W. Scripps Company and its newly established Scripps Sports division, under a multi-year deal beginning in the 2023–24 NHL season. Scripps' Laughlin station KMCC will serve as flagship station of the Golden Knights' television network. KMCC is a sister station to Las Vegas ABC affiliate KTNV-TV, which may also air selected Golden Knights games by virtue of the NHL's broadcast television rights with ABC, and has previously aired simulcasts of Golden Knights preseason games with ATTSN. The Golden Knights also launched an in-market streaming service, KnightTime+, to carry the games. The service costs $69.99 a season or $6.99 a game.

Outside of Las Vegas, the Golden Knights' regional television network includes other Scripps stations, outside one station in Reno;

- KNSN-TV/Reno (owned by Deerfield Media)
- KIVI-DT2/Boise, Idaho and KSAW-LD2/Twin Falls
- Second subchannel of Montana Television Network stations
- KASW/Phoenix, Arizona and KWBA-TV/Tucson

Beginning in the 2024–25 season, the Golden Knights' television territory was extended to Arizona following the deactivation and relocation of the Arizona Coyotes; selected Golden Knights games were picked up by KMCC's sister stations KASW in Phoenix and KWBA in Tucson, airing alongside the re-located Utah Mammoth.

From its inaugural season through 2022–23, AT&T SportsNet Rocky Mountain (ATTSN) was the regional television rightsholder for all Golden Knights games not broadcast exclusively by the NHL's national television partners. Golden Knights games on KMCC, and formerly on ATTSN, are called by former Boston Bruins radio announcer Dave Goucher on play-by-play, Shane Hnidy, who previously worked color for the Winnipeg Jets on TSN, and Ashali Vise, who is the rinkside reporter.

==== Radio ====
The team has a three-year radio deal with Lotus Broadcasting. Lotus airs the team's games on its Fox Sports Radio affiliate, KKGK 1340/94.7. KKGK fronts a network of nine stations across Nevada, California, Arizona, and Utah.The FM radio broadcasts were aired on 98.9 until December 18, 2025, when KKGK switched signals with KXPT-HD2. Dan D'uva does the play by play and Gary Lawless does analysis.

One game a week is also aired on KENO 1460, a Spanish-language sports radio station, making the team one of only three in the NHL to offer Spanish-language broadcasts.

=== Minor league affiliates ===
On May 16, 2017, the Golden Knights entered a multi-year affiliation agreement with a minor league team, the Chicago Wolves of the American Hockey League. Like most NHL–AHL affiliation arrangements, the Golden Knights were able to transfer players to and from the Wolves. Although the Wolves were the Golden Knights affiliate, the two teams do not share the same ownership. In addition to the Wolves, the Golden Knights were affiliated with the Quad City Mallards of the ECHL for the 2017–18 season, however, the Mallards ceased operations after the one season.

On August 21, 2018, the Golden Knights entered a one-year affiliation agreement with the Fort Wayne Komets of the ECHL for the 2018–19 season.

On February 6, 2020, Spurs Sports & Entertainment announced the sale of the San Antonio Rampage franchise to the Golden Knights organization. It was later announced on February 28, that the Rampage franchise was approved to relocate to the Henderson/Las Vegas area by the AHL. On May 28, the name of the relocated franchise was revealed to be the Henderson Silver Knights, mimicking the logo style and aura of their parent club. The shield-shaped logo features a silver-colored Destrier, with eyes that are the same color gold used in the logo for the Golden Knights. The Silver Knights began play in the 2020–21 season at Orleans Arena, while Dollar Loan Center was under construction.

On May 19, 2022, the Golden Knights announced a one-year affiliation agreement with the expansion Savannah Ghost Pirates of the ECHL, through the 2022–23 season.

On July 16, 2024, the Golden Knights announced a multi-year affiliation agreement with the expansion Tahoe Knight Monsters of the ECHL, resulting in Nevada hosting both of the franchise's minor-league affiliates.

== Season-by-season record ==
This is a partial list of the last five seasons completed by the Golden Knights. For the full season-by-season history, see List of Vegas Golden Knights seasons.

GP = Games played, W = Wins, L = Losses, T = Ties, OTL = Overtime Losses, Pts = Points, GF = Goals for, GA = Goals against

Season	GP	W	L	OTL	Pts	GF	GA	Finish	Playoffs
2021–22	82	43	31	8	94	266	248	4th, Pacific	Did not qualify
2022–23	82	51	22	9	111	272	229	1st, Pacific	Stanley Cup champions, 4–1 (Panthers)
2023–24	82	45	29	8	98	267	245	4th, Pacific	Lost in first round, 3–4 (Stars)
2024–25	82	50	22	10	110	275	219	1st, Pacific	Lost in second round, 1–4 (Oilers)
2025–26	82	39	26	17	95	265	250	1st, Pacific	Lost in Stanley Cup Final, 2–4 (Hurricanes)

== Players and personnel ==
=== Current roster ===
Updated November 22, 2026

No.	Nat	Player	Pos	S/G	Age	Acquired	Birthplace
4	(Sweden)	Rasmus Andersson	D	R	30	2026	Malmo, Sweden
49	(Russia)	Ivan Barbashev	C	L	30	2023	Moscow, Russia
42	(Canada)	Braeden Bowman	RW	R	23	2025	Kitchener, Ontario
52	(Canada)	Dylan Coghlan	D	R	28	2025	Duncan, British Columbia
24	(United States)	Trevor Connelly	LW	L	20	2024	Tustin, California
51	(Canada)	Lukas Cormier	D	L	24	2020	Ste-Marie-de-Kent, New Brunswick
26	(United States)	Nic Dowd	C	R	36	2026	Huntsville, Alabama
9	(United States)	Jack Eichel (A)	C	R	30	2021	North Chelmsford, Massachusetts
17	(United States)	Marc Gatcomb	C	R	27	2026	Woburn, Massachusetts
15	(United States)	Noah Hanifin	D	L	29	2024	Boston, Massachusetts
79	(Canada)	Carter Hart	G	L	28	2025	Sherwood Park, Alberta
48	(Czech Republic)	Tomáš Hertl	C	L	33	2024	Prague, Czech Republic
33	(Canada)	Adin Hill	G	L	30	2022	Comox, British Columbia
21	(Canada)	Brett Howden	C	L	28	2021	Oakbank, Manitoba
71	(Sweden)	William Karlsson (A)	C	L	32	2017	Märsta, Sweden
5	(Canada)	Jérémy Lauzon	D	L	29	2025	Val-d'Or, Quebec
36	(Canada)	Raphaël Lavoie	C	R	26	2024	Chambly, Quebec
93	(Canada)	Mitch Marner	RW	R	29	2025	Markham, Ontario
3	(Canada)	Brayden McNabb	D	L	35	2017	Davidson, Saskatchewan
95	(Sweden)	Victor Olofsson	LW	L	31	2026	Örnsköldsvik, Sweden
61	(Canada)	Mark Stone (C)	RW	R	34	2019	Winnipeg, Manitoba
27	(Canada)	Shea Theodore	D	L	31	2017	Langley, British Columbia
29	(Canada)	Parker Wotherspoon	D	L	29	2026	Surrey, British Columbia

=== Team captains ===
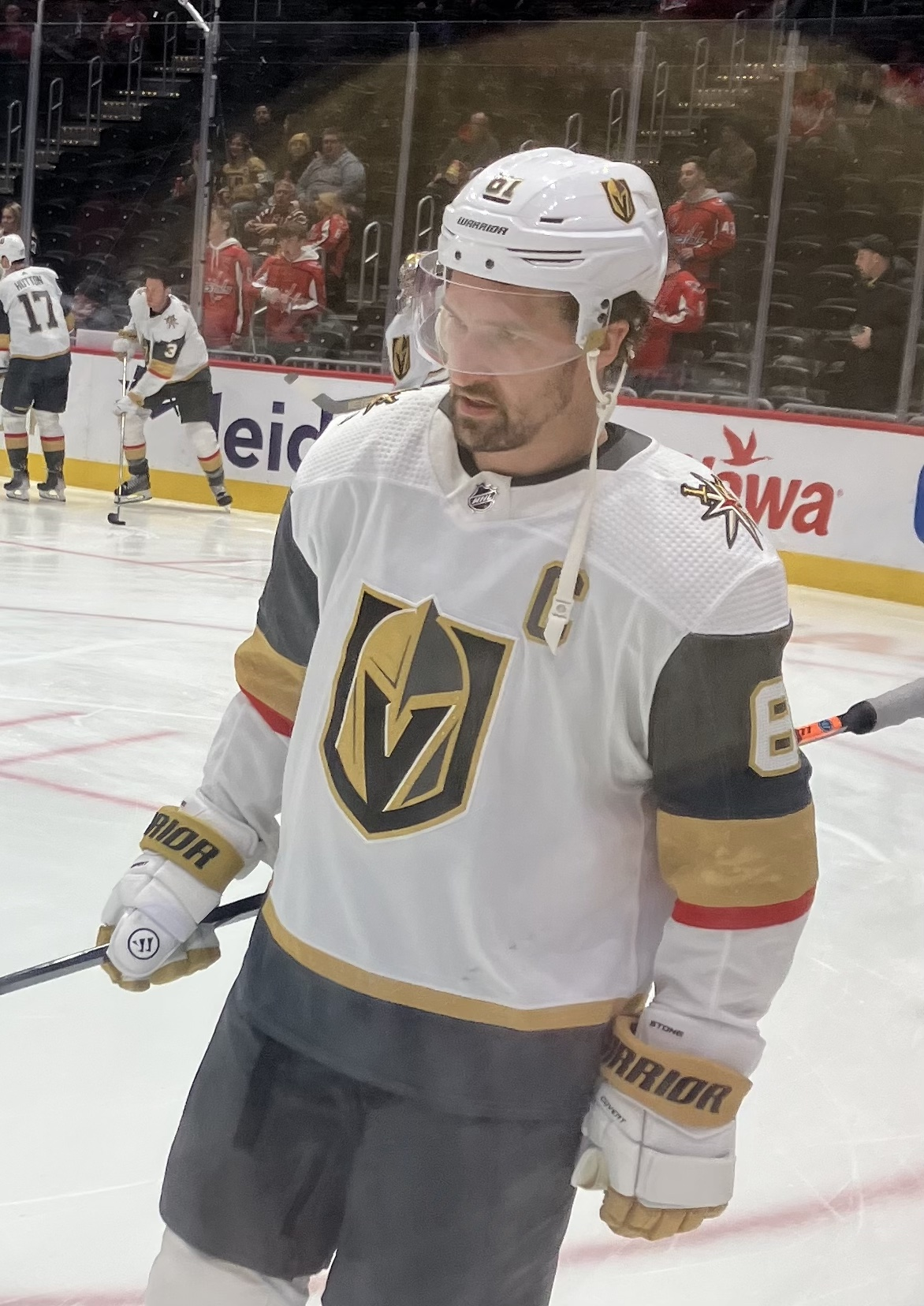
Mark Stone was named the Golden Knights' first captain in 2021.

- Mark Stone, 2021–present

=== Head coaches ===
- Gerard Gallant, 2017–2020
- Peter DeBoer, 2020–2022
- Bruce Cassidy, 2022–2026
- John Tortorella, 2026
- Ryan Craig, 2026–present

=== General managers ===
- George McPhee, 2016–2019
- Kelly McCrimmon, 2019–present

=== Other personnel ===
- George McPhee, 2016–present, president of hockey operations
- Vaughn Karpan, 2016–present, director of player personnel
- Bob Lowes, 2016–present, assistant director of player personnel

== Team and league honors ==
=== Awards and trophies ===
Stanley Cup

- 2022–23

Clarence S. Campbell Bowl

- 2017–18
- 2022–23
- 2025–26

Conn Smythe Trophy

- Jonathan Marchessault: 2023

Jack Adams Award

- Gerard Gallant: 2017–18

Lady Byng Memorial Trophy

- William Karlsson: 2017–18

Mark Messier Leadership Award

- Deryk Engelland: 2017–18

NHL General Manager of the Year Award

- George McPhee: 2017–18

Vezina Trophy

- Marc-André Fleury: 2020–21

William M. Jennings Trophy

- Marc-André Fleury and Robin Lehner: 2020–21

NHL Second All-Star Team

- Marc-André Fleury: 2020–21

=== First-round draft picks ===
- 2017: Cody Glass (6th overall), Nick Suzuki (13th overall), Erik Brännström (15th overall)
- 2019: Peyton Krebs (17th overall)
- 2020: Brendan Brisson (29th overall)
- 2021: Zach Dean (30th overall)
- 2023: David Edstrom (32nd overall)
- 2024: Trevor Connelly (19th overall)
- 2026: Juho Piiparinen (29th overall)

=== Retired numbers ===
The number 58 was retired by the team on March 31, 2018, in honor of the 58 victims killed in the October 2017 Las Vegas shooting.

The team is also not able to issue the jersey number 99 to any of its players as it was retired league-wide in honor of Wayne Gretzky at the 2000 NHL All-Star Game.

== Statistics and records ==
=== Scoring leaders ===
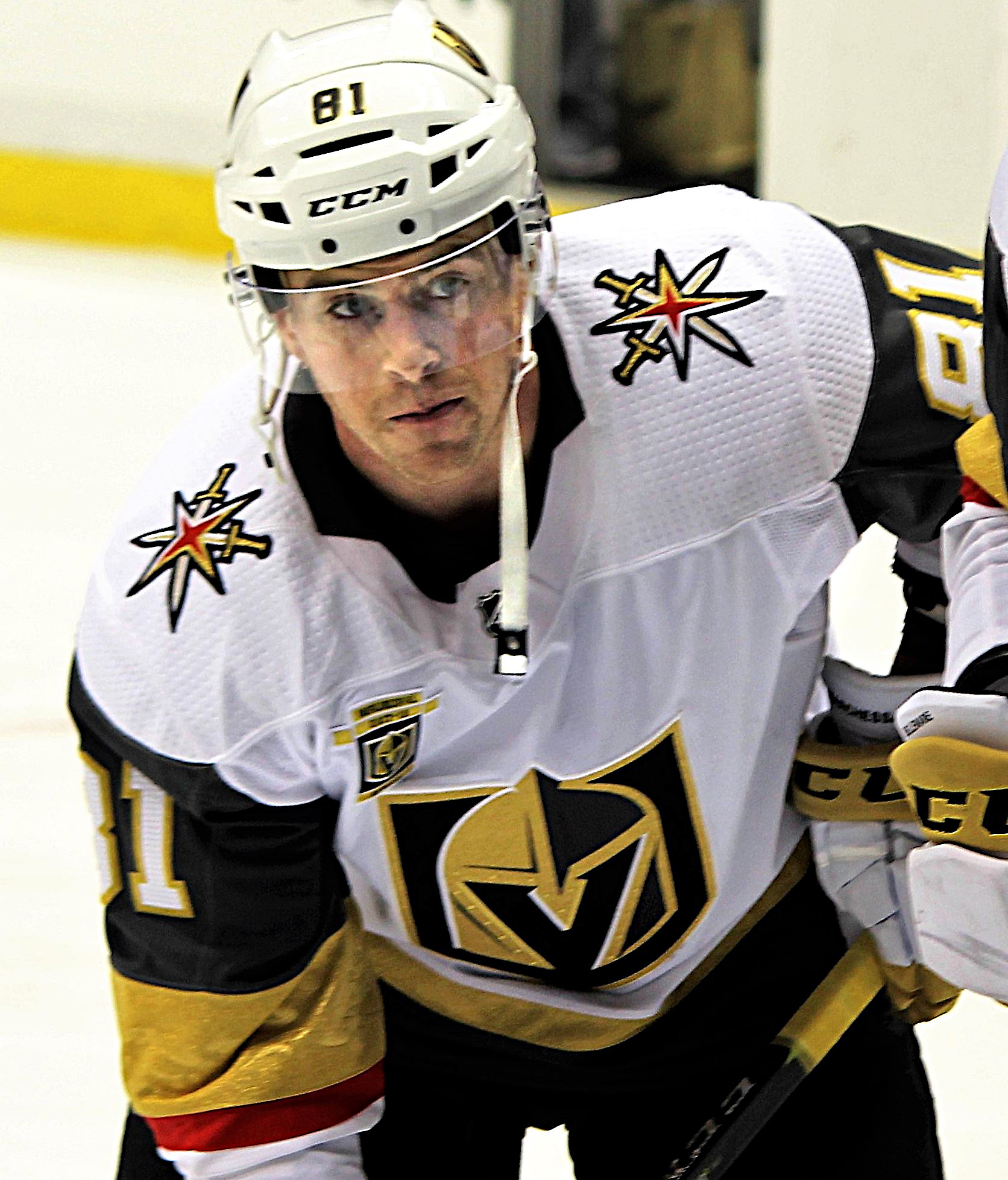
Jonathan Marchessault leads the franchise all-time in goals and points.

These are the top-ten point-scorers in franchise history. Figures are updated after each completed NHL regular season.

- * – current Golden Knights player

Note: Pos = Position; GP = Games Played; G = Goals; A = Assists; Pts = Points; P/G = Points per game

Points
Player	Pos	GP	G	A	Pts	P/G
Jonathan Marchessault	LW	514	192	225	417	.81
William Karlsson*	C	569	165	238	403	.71
Mark Stone*	RW	400	136	260	396	.95
Shea Theodore*	D	581	83	302	385	.66
Jack Eichel*	C	315	127	216	343	1.09
Reilly Smith	RW	489	143	180	323	.66
Chandler Stephenson	C	327	75	162	237	.72
Max Pacioretty	LW	224	97	97	194	.87
Alex Pietrangelo*	D	329	39	148	187	.57
Ivan Barbashev*	LW	257	71	102	173	.67

Goals
Player	Pos	G
Jonathan Marchessault	LW	192
William Karlsson*	C	165
Reilly Smith	RW	143
Mark Stone*	RW	136
Jack Eichel*	C	127
Max Pacioretty	LW	97
Pavel Dorofeyev	RW	92
Shea Theodore*	D	83
Chandler Stephenson	C	75
Ivan Barbashev*	LW	71

Assists
Player	Pos	A
Shea Theodore*	D	302
Mark Stone*	RW	260
William Karlsson*	C	238
Jonathan Marchessault	LW	225
Jack Eichel*	C	216
Reilly Smith	RW	180
Chandler Stephenson	LW	162
Alex Pietrangelo*	D	148
Brayden McNabb*	D	110
Ivan Barbashev*	LW	102

=== Goaltending leaders ===
These are the top-ten goaltenders in franchise history by wins. Figures are updated after each completed NHL regular season.

- * – current Golden Knights player

Note: GP = Games played; W = Wins; L = Losses; T/O = Ties/Overtime losses; GA = Goal against; GAA = Goals against average; SA = Shots against; SV% = Save percentage; SO = Shutouts

Goaltenders
Player	GP	W	L	T/O	GA	GAA	SA	SV%	SO
Marc-André Fleury	192	117	60	14	456	2.41	5,509	.917	23
Adin Hill*	139	77	41	14	348	2.64	3,580	.903	7
Logan Thompson	103	56	32	11	264	2.67	3,001	.912	4
Robin Lehner	66	39	21	4	169	2.61	1,876	.910	3
Malcolm Subban	63	30	21	7	175	2.92	1,772	.901	1
Akira Schmid	39	18	10	7	90	2.45	881	.898	2
Laurent Brossoit	35	17	9	6	85	2.66	905	.906	1
Ilya Samsonov	29	16	9	4	82	2.82	752	.891	2
Carter Hart*	18	11	3	3	46	2.71	422	.891	0
Maxime Lagacé	17	6	8	1	61	3.92	461	.868	0

=== Individual records ===
- Most goals in a season: William Karlsson, 43 (2017–18)
- Most assists in a season: Jack Eichel, 66 (2024–25)
- Most points in a season: Jack Eichel, 94 (2024–25)
- Most points in a season, defenseman: Shea Theodore, 57 (2024–25)
- Most points in a season, rookie: Alex Tuch, 37 (2017–18)
- Most penalty minutes in a season: Jérémy Lauzon, 89 (2025–26)
- Best +/– in a season: William Karlsson, 49 (2017–18)
- Most wins in a season: Marc-André Fleury, 35 (2018–19)
- Most shutouts in a season: Marc-André Fleury, 8 (2018–19)
- Lowest GAA in a season (minimum 30 games played): Marc-André Fleury, 1.98 (2020–21)
- Best SV% in a season (minimum 30 games played): Marc-André Fleury, .928 (2020–21)
- Most goals in a playoff season: Brett Howden, 14 (2025–26)
- Most assists in a playoff season: Jack Eichel, 20 (2022–23, 2025–26)
- Most points in a playoff season: Mitch Marner, 29 (2025–26)
- Most penalty minutes in a playoff season: Keegan Kolesar, 50 (2022–23)
- Best +/– in a playoff season: Jonathan Marchessault, 17 (2022–23)
- Most wins in a playoff season: Carter Hart, 14 (2025–26)
- Most shutouts in a playoff season: Marc-André Fleury, 4 (2017–18)
- Lowest GAA in a playoff season (minimum 5 games played): Robin Lehner, 1.99 (2019–20)
- Best SV% in a playoff season (minimum 5 games played): Adin Hill, .932 (2022–23)

== See also ==
- City National Arena
- Henderson Silver Knights
- Las Vegas Thunder
- Las Vegas Wranglers
- Tahoe Knight Monsters
- Sports in the Las Vegas metropolitan area

Preceded by Colorado Avalanche	Stanley Cup champions 2022–23	Succeeded by Florida Panthers
