= KOKO-FM =

Coordinates: 36.7413°N 120.0866°W

- Kerman, California; United States
- Broadcast area: Kerman–Fresno, California
- Frequency: 94.3 MHz
- Branding: 94.3 La Mera Mera

Programming
- Language: Spanish
- Format: Regional Mexican

Ownership
- Owner: TEG Broadcasting; (Teg Broadcasting Inc.)
- Operator: Lotus Communications (full acquisition pending)

History
- First air date: April 16, 1990; 36 years ago
- Former call signs: KTAA (1988–1998); KKPW (1998–2001)
- Call sign meaning: "Killer Oldies" (former branding)

Technical information
- Licensing authority: FCC
- Facility ID: 3970
- Class: A
- ERP: 6,000 watts
- HAAT: 100 meters (330 ft)
- Translator: 107.9 K300CC (Huron)

Links
- Public license information: Public file; LMS
- Website: www.943lameramera.com

KOKO-FM (94.3 MHz) is a radio station licensed to Kerman, California. Owned by TEG Broadcasting and operated by Lotus Communications (pending full acquisition), it broadcasts a regional Mexican oldies format targeting Fresno.

== History ==
KOKO-FM originally signed on the air April 16, 1990, as country station KTAA and was owned by Barnard Broadcasting A California Limited Partnership during the early 1990s. In the early 1990s, the station flipped to a short-lived hip-hop format as Jammin 94, before flipping to regional Mexican La Fiesta. In 1997, the station was acquired by Hispanic Radio Enterprise Inc., and flipped to a rhythmic format as 94.3 The Party. In 1998, Art Laboe acquired the station and it was rebranded as Power 94, and later Hit Radio 94.3 in August 2001. This was then followed by a rhythmic AC format.

Former logo

On June 28, 2012, KOKO-FM flipped to classic hits. On November 27, 2018, KOKO-FM again changed formats, this time to rhythmic oldies as Jammin' 94.3.

Art Laboe died October 7, 2022, at age 97. In July 2023, TED Broadcasting agreed to purchase KOKO-FM from the Art Laboe estate for $330,000. It soon began broadcasting the Punjabi "Radio Punjab" network.

As of August 3, 2024, KOKO-FM switched to a classic regional Mexican format under the branding "94.3 La Mera Mera". It was then announced that TEG broadcasting would sell KOKO-FM to Lotus Communications in exchange for one of its own stations in which Lotus began operating the station ahead of closing.

On August 27, 2025 KOKO's construction permit was granted to move transmitters to the Diablo Range.
