= List of Vegas Golden Knights seasons =

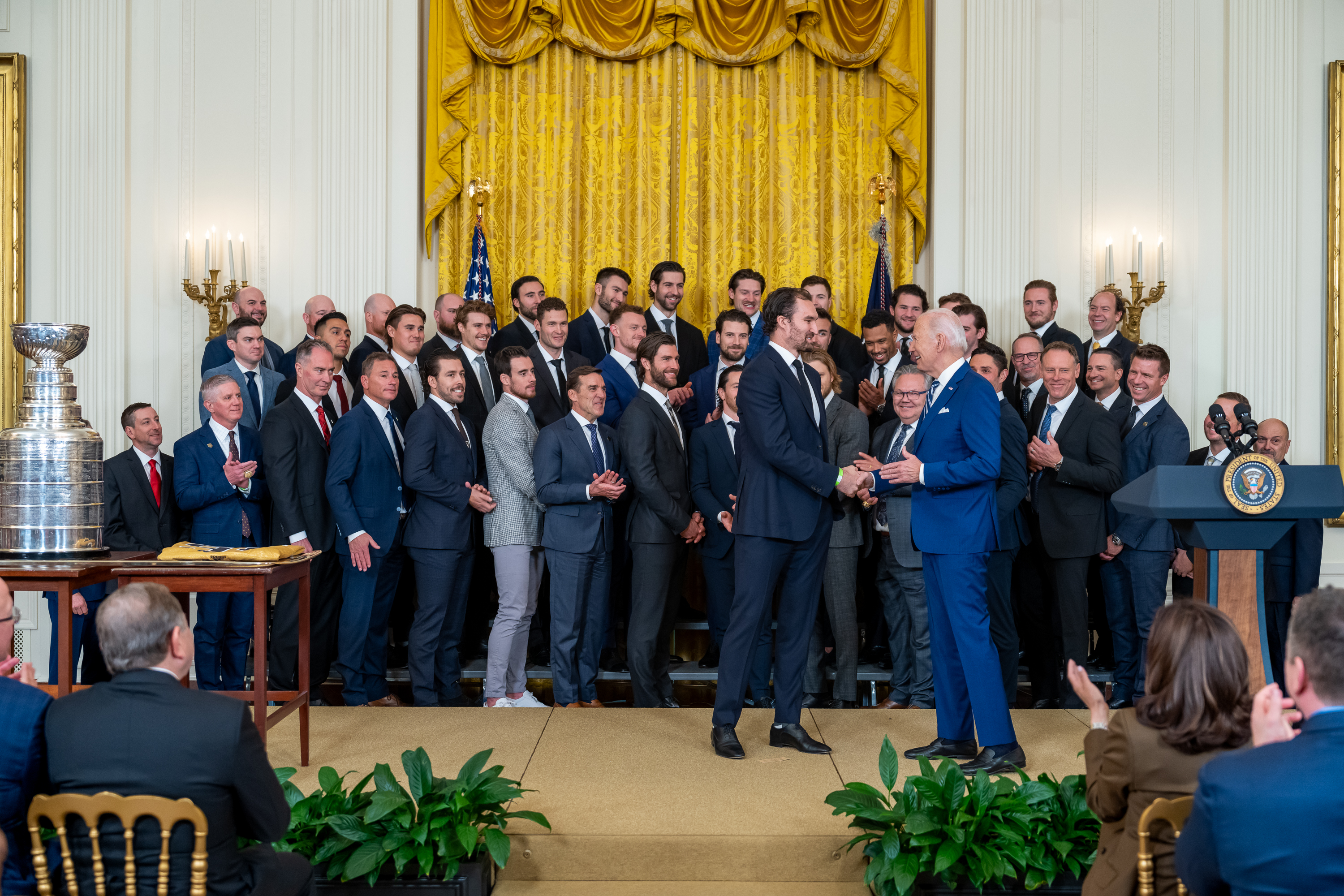
The 2023 Stanley Cup champion Golden Knights with then-U.S. President Joe Biden at the White House in 2023

The Vegas Golden Knights are a professional ice hockey franchise located in Las Vegas metropolitan area. Founded ahead of the 2017–18 season as an expansion team, they play in the Pacific Division of the Western Conference in the National Hockey League (NHL). The franchise plays its home games at T-Mobile Arena on the Las Vegas Strip in Paradise, Nevada. As of the conclusion of the 2025–26 season, the Golden Knights have won 401 regular-season games, the third-fewest in the NHL among active teams; in 2023–24, however, they became the fastest expansion franchise in NHL history to reach 300 wins.

Noted for their early success as a franchise, the Golden Knights have qualified for the Stanley Cup playoffs eight times in their nine completed seasons, with five Pacific Division championships, three Stanley Cup Final appearances, and a Stanley Cup championship in 2023. During their inaugural season in 2017–18, the Golden Knights broke the NHL records for most wins and points in an inaugural season and became the first franchise since the 1967–68 St. Louis Blues to reach the Final in their inaugural season; however, they ultimately lost the 2018 Stanley Cup Final to the Washington Capitals in five games. After suffering a first-round exit against the San Jose Sharks in 2019, the Golden Knights returned to the Western Conference finals in the COVID-19 pandemic-affected 2020 playoffs, falling in five games to the Dallas Stars. During the pandemic-shortened 2020–21 season, the Golden Knights were temporarily placed in the single-season West Division; after finishing second behind the Colorado Avalanche, the Golden Knights again fell one round short of the Stanley Cup Final, losing to the Montreal Canadiens in six games in a re-aligned Stanley Cup semifinals. Despite entering the following 2021–22 season as Stanley Cup favorites, the Golden Knights suffered a rash of injuries and poor play, eventually missing the playoffs for the first time in franchise history. In their sixth season, the team rebounded, winning the Pacific Division for the first time since 2020 and defeating the Florida Panthers in five games in the Stanley Cup Final to win their first Stanley Cup, becoming the fastest expansion team to win the Cup in NHL history. The Golden Knights' championship defense in 2023–24 began with the longest season-opening winning streak of any defending champion in NHL history, as they began the season 7–0–0; however, the team struggled later in the season, qualifying for the 2024 Stanley Cup playoffs as a wild card and losing to the Dallas Stars in the first round in seven games.In 2026, the Golden Knights fired cup-winning coach Bruce Cassidy with 8 games left in the regular season and hired John Tortorella. The team went 7-0-1 to end the regular season. In the playoffs, they went on an unexpected run and swept the President’s Trophy winning Colorado Avalanche in the conference final to win their third Western Conference championship in nine years as a franchise. They ultimately lost the Stanley Cup Final in 6 games to the Carolina Hurricanes.

== Table key ==
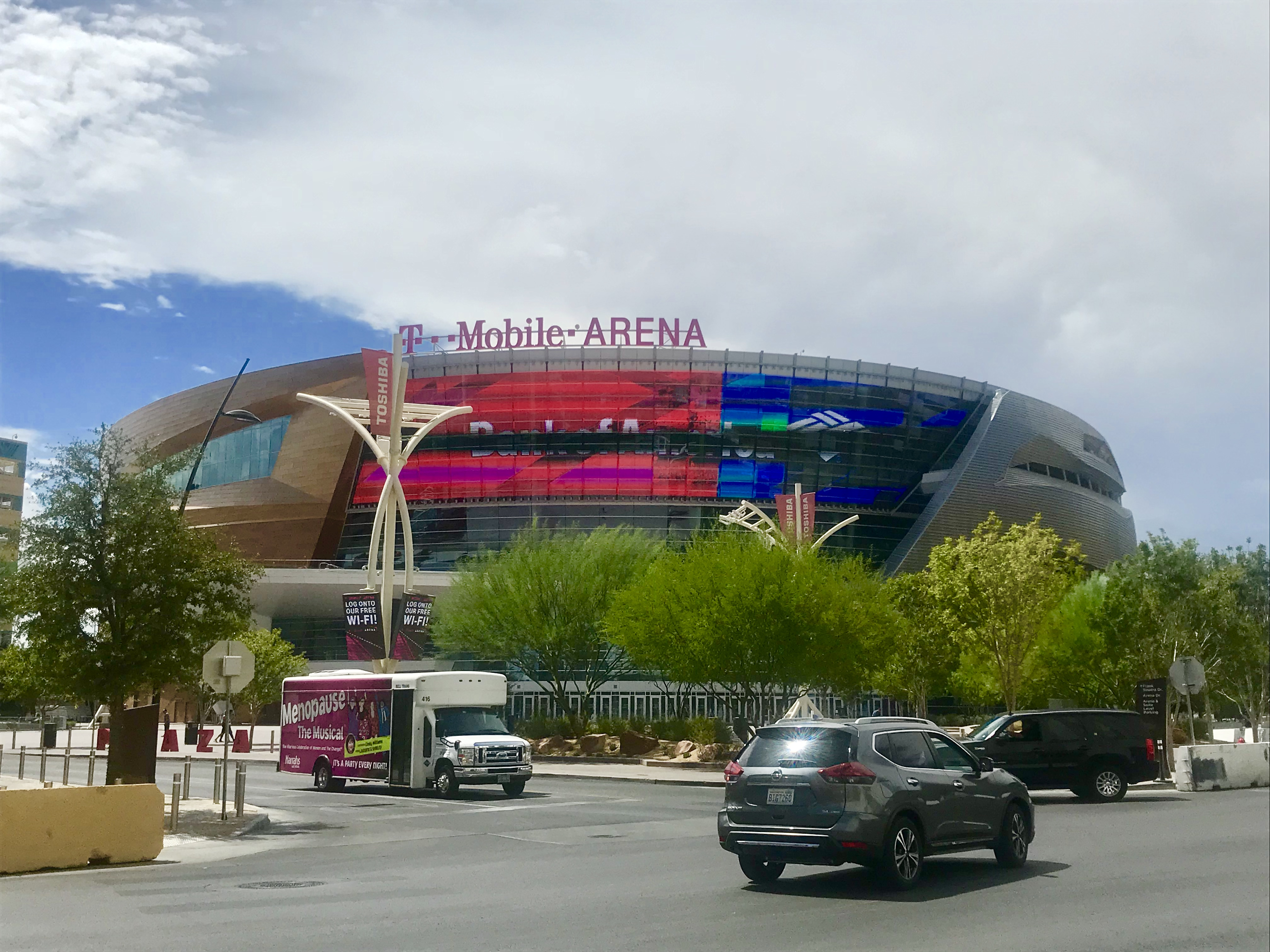
The Golden Knights have played home games at T-Mobile Arena on the Las Vegas Strip since their founding in 2017.

Key of colors and symbols
Color/symbol	Explanation
†	Stanley Cup champions
‡	Conference champions
↑	Division champions
#	Led league in points

Key of terms and abbreviations
Term or abbreviation	Definition
Finish	Final position in division or league standings
GP	Number of games played
W	Number of wins
L	Number of losses
OT	Number of losses in overtime or shootouts
Pts	Number of points
GF	Goals for (goals scored by the Golden Knights)
GA	Goals against (goals scored by the Golden Knights' opponents)
—	Does not apply

== Year by year ==
List of all seasons played by the Vegas Golden Knights
NHL season	Golden Knights season	Conference	Division	Regular season								Postseason (Note: The result of the playoff series shows the Golden Knights' result first regardless of the outcome, followed by the opposing team in parentheses.)					
NHL season	Golden Knights season	Conference	Division	Finish	GP	W	L	OT (Note: Overtime and shootout losses are worth one point.)	Pts	GF	GA	GP	W	L	GF	GA	Result
2017–18	2017–18	Western‡	Pacific↑	1st	82	51	24	7	109	272	228	20	13	7	57	47	Won in first round, 4–0 (Kings); Won in second round, 4–2 (Sharks); Won conference finals, 4–1 (Jets); Lost in Stanley Cup Final, 1–4 (Capitals)
2018–19	2018–19	Western	Pacific	3rd	82	43	32	7	93	249	230	7	3	4	25	23	Lost in first round, 3–4 (Sharks)
2019–20	2019–20	Western	Pacific↑	1st	71 (Note: The 2019–20 NHL season was suspended on March 12, 2020 due to the COVID-19 pandemic.)	39	24	8	86	227	211	20	12	8	57	44	Finished first in seeding round-robin (3–0); Won in first round, 4–1 (Blackhawks); Won in second round, 4–3 (Canucks); Lost in conference finals, 1–4 (Stars)
2020–21	2020–21	—	West (Note: Due to the COVID-19 pandemic, the 2020–21 NHL season was shortened to 56 games. Additionally, conferences were temporarily removed, and the Golden Knights were placed in the single-season West Division.)	2nd	56	40	14	2	82	191	124	19	10	9	53	46	Won in first round, 4–3 (Wild); Won in second round, 4–2 (Avalanche); Lost in Stanley Cup semifinals, 2–4 (Canadiens)
2021–22	2021–22	Western	Pacific	4th	82	43	31	8	94	266	248	—	—	—	—	—	Did not qualify
2022–23	2022–23	Western‡	Pacific↑	1st	82	51	22	9	111	272	229	22	16	6	88	57	Won in first round, 4–1 (Jets); Won in second round, 4–2 (Oilers); Won in conference finals, 4–2 (Stars); Won in Stanley Cup Final, 4–1 (Panthers)†
2023–24	2023–24	Western	Pacific	4th	82	45	29	8	98	267	245	7	3	4	16	16	Lost in first round, 3–4 (Stars)
2024–25	2024–25	Western	Pacific↑	1st	82	50	22	10	110	275	219	11	5	6	28	35	Won in first round, 4–2 (Wild); Lost in second round, 1–4 (Oilers)
2025–26	2025–26	Western‡	Pacific↑	1st	82	39	26	17	95	265	250	22	14	8	76	62	Won in first round, 4–2 (Mammoth); Won in second round, 4–2 (Ducks); Won conference finals, 4–0 (Avalanche); Lost in Stanley Cup Final, 2–4 (Hurricanes)
Totals (Note: Totals as of the completion of the 2025–26 season)					701	401	224	76	878	2,284	1,984	128	76	52	400	330	8 playoff appearances

== All-time records ==
Vegas Golden Knights all-time regular-season and postseason records
Statistic	GP	W	L	OT
Regular season record (2017–present)	701	401	224	76
Postseason record (2017–present)	128	76	52	—
All-time regular and postseason record	829	477	276	59
All-time playoff series record: 15–7 (Note: The NHL playoffs are a single-elimination tournament which feature four rounds of best-of-seven series to advance. This figure represents the Golden Knights' win-loss record in playoff series as a whole, as opposed to game-by-game record in those series.)
