= Lotus Communications =

American radio and television broadcast company

Lotus Communications Corporation
- Type: Private
- Industry: Broadcasting
- Founded: 1962; 64 years ago
- Headquarters: Los Angeles, California
- Key people: Howard Kalmenson (CEO)
- Website: www.lotuscorp.com

Lotus Communications Corporation is a media company that owns numerous radio stations and a few TV stations, and is one of the largest privately owned radio station groups in the United States. Headquarters are located in Los Angeles, and the company's President and CEO is Howard Kalmenson.

== Radio ==
As of May 2025, Lotus has a total of 36 stations in Arizona, California, Nevada, Idaho and Washington (State).

In August 2018, Lotus announced that it would acquire Scripps' Tucson and Boise clusters for $8 million. To comply with ownership limits due to its existing stations in Tucson, Lotus divested KQTH and KTGV.

In June 2021, Sinclair Broadcast Group agreed to sell KOMO (AM), KOMO-FM, KVI and KPLZ to Lotus Communications for $18 million. Sinclair retained KOMO-TV, plus rights to the KOMO call letters.

=== Arizona ===
==== Tucson ====
- KFFN AM 1490 / KMXZ HD-4 FM 94.9 - ESPN Tucson (Sports)
- K232FD FM 94.3 / KTKT AM 990 - La Buena (Spanish Oldies)
- K239CF FM 95.7 / KCMT FM 92.1 - La Caliente (Regional Mexican)
- KMXZ-FM 94.9 - Mixfm (Adult Contemporary)
- KLPX FM 96.1 - KLPX (Classic Rock)
- KFMA FM 102.1 - Rock KFMA (Active Rock)
- K227DX FM 93.3 / KLPX-HD3 FM 96.1 - Hank FM (Classic Country)

=== California ===
==== Los Angeles ====
- KWKW AM 1330 - La Primera (Spanish Sports Talk)
- KTMZ AM 1220 - Simulcast Of KWKW For The Inland Empire
- KIRN AM 670 - Radio Irán (Ethnic Iranian)
- KFWB AM 980 - La Mera Mera (Classic Regional Mexican)

==== Bakersfield ====
- K229CD FM 93.7 / KCHJ AM 1010 - El Gallito (Ranchera & Norteña Oldies)
- KQKZ FM 92.1 - Retro (Bilingual Adult Contemporary)
- KIWI FM 102.9 - Radio Lobo (Regional Mexican)
- KPSL-FM 96.5 - Grupera (Retro Regional Mexican)

==== Fresno ====
- KOKO-FM FM 94.3 - La Mera Mera (Regional Mexican Oldies)
- KSEQ FM 97.1 - Q (Rhythmic Contemporary)
- KLBN FM 101.9 - La Buena (Regional Mexican)
- KKBZ FM 105.1 - Caliente (Hispanic Rhythmic)
- KHIT-FM 107.1 - Exitos (Spanish Adult Hits)

==== Sacramento ====
- K284CM FM 104.7 / KSAC AM 890 - Fox Sports (Sports)
- KVMX-FM 92.1 - La Ranchera (Ranchera & Classic Regional Mexican)
- KSAC-FM 105.5 - Simulcast Of KVMX-FM

San Diego

- KFBG FM 100.7 - Frontera (Regional Mexican)

=== Idaho ===
==== Boise ====
- KRVB 94.9 - The River (Adult Album Alternative)
- KQXR 100.3 - The X (Active Rock)
- KJOT 105.1 - Jack FM (Adult Hits)
- KTHI 107.1 - Hank FM (Classic Country)

=== Nevada ===
==== Las Vegas ====
- KENO AM 1460 - Deportes Vegas (Spanish Sports)
- KRLV AM 920 - Raider Nation Radio (Sports)
- KOMP FM 92.3 - KOMP (Active Rock)
- KXPT FM 97.1 - The Point (Classic Rock)
- KWID FM 101.9 - La Buena (Spanish Adult Hits)
- K265EZ FM 100.9 / KWWN AM 1100 - ESPN Las Vegas (Talk/Sports)
- KLAV AM 1230 - VSIN Las Vegas The Game (Sports)
- K234BS FM 94.7 / KOMP-HD2 FM 92.3 /KKGK AM 1340 - Fox Sports (Talk/Sports)
- K255CT FM 98.9 / KXPT-HD2 FM 97.1 - Hank FM (Classic Country)

==== Reno ====
- KPLY AM 630 - Fox Sports (Sports)
- KFOY AM 1060 - Radio For America (Conservative Talk)
- K231CS FM 94.1 / KHIT AM 1450 - ESPN Radio (Talk/Sports)
- K232EA FM 94.3 / KTHX-FM 94.5 - Qué Buena (Regional Mexican)
- KXZZ FM 100.1 - Hank FM (Classic Country)
- KDOT FM 104.5 - Rock (Active Rock)
- KOZZ-FM 105.7 - KOZZ FM (Classic Rock)

=== Washington ===
==== Seattle ====
- KVI AM 570 - Talk Radio (Conservative Talk)
- KNWN AM 1000 - Northwest News Radio (All-News)
- KNWN-FM 97.7 - FM Simulcast Of KNWN (AM) Seattle
- KPLZ-FM 101.5 - Hank FM (Classic Country)

== Television ==
All of Lotus' television stations are affiliated with Multimedios Television, Telemax & Mira TV.

On June 4, 2021, it was announced that Lotus Communications would sell KHLM-LD to the Christian Television Network for $1.1 million. The sale was completed on August 18.

On March 11, 2022, Gray Television (owner of CBS affiliate KPHO-TV and independent station KTVK) filed an application to acquire KPHE-LD for $1.75 million. The sale was completed on May 4. Lotus had previously reached a deal to sell to Sovryn Holdings for $2 million, which was not consummated, as part of its exit from the few low-power TV stations it still owned.
