= KOMP (FM) =

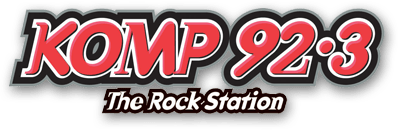
- Las Vegas, Nevada; United States
- Broadcast area: Las Vegas metropolitan area
- Frequency: 92.3 MHz (HD Radio)
- Branding: KOMP 92.3

Programming
- Format: Active rock
- Subchannels: HD2: Fox Sports Radio Las Vegas (Sports radio)
- Affiliations: Las Vegas Raiders Radio Network

Ownership
- Owner: Lotus Communications; (Lotus Broadcasting Corp.)
- Sister stations: KENO, KKGK, KLAV, KRLV, KWID, KWWN, KXPT

History
- First air date: September 1, 1966
- Former call signs: KULA (1966–1970); KVEG-FM (1970–1975); KTRI (1975–1978); KENO-FM (1978–1982)
- Call sign meaning: Sounds like "comp"

Technical information
- Licensing authority: FCC
- Facility ID: 38451
- Class: C
- ERP: 25,000 watts
- HAAT: 1,124 meters (3,688 ft)
- Transmitter coordinates: 35.9658°N 115.5017°W
- Translator: HD2: 94.7 K234BS (Las Vegas)

Links
- Public license information: Public file; LMS
- Webcast: Listen live; HD2: Listen live
- Website: www.komp.com; HD2: www.lvsportsnetwork.com/fox-sports-las-vegas-1340-am-947fm/

KOMP (92.3 MHz) is a commercial FM radio station licensed to Las Vegas, Nevada. KOMP broadcasts an active rock radio format and is owned by Lotus Communications. Its studios and offices are on West Flamingo Road in Spring Valley in Clark County, using a Las Vegas address.

KOMP has an effective radiated power (ERP) of 25,000 watts as a Class C station. Its transmitter is on Potosi Mountain in Blue Diamond, southwest of the Las Vegas Valley. KOMP broadcasts using HD Radio technology. Its HD2 digital subchannel carries a simulcast of the sports radio programming of sister station KKGK.

== History ==
=== KULA, KVEG-FM, KTRI and KENO-FM ===
The station signed on the air on September 1, 1966. Its original call sign was KULA and it was a sister station to KVEG (970 AM) with studios in the Castaways Hotel. Because KVEG was a daytimer, KULA simulcast its country music programming in the daytime and continued it at night when KVEG was off the air.

In the 1970s, AM 970 KVEG began playing oldies while 92.3 FM continued the country sounds as KTRI. It was an affiliate of the ABC Information Network. While the station was powered at 27,000 watts, its tower was only 180 feet (55 m) tall, so it was only heard in and around Las Vegas.

Around 1980, the station became KENO-FM. It aired the same Top 40 format as KENO (1460 AM) as management moved the hit music sounds from its AM station to an FM signal. The two stations were affiliated with the ABC Contemporary Network. KENO-FM was granted a construction permit by the Federal Communications Commission (FCC) to boost its power to 100,000 watts and relocated to a tower at 1,520 feet (460 m).

=== KOMP ===
The format flipped to album rock on February 8, 1981. The station's first song in the rock format was The Who's "Long Live Rock". The station's new call sign was KOMP and it was known simply as FM92 K-O-M-P. Over the years, the format has since evolved to active rock.

Some of the DJs from that era included Big Marty and Leslie Blied, Todd Fowler, Dice Martin and Lark Williams. The station's slogan later became "KOMP 92.3 The Rock Of Las Vegas." Other personalities included: Byrd (later with WDRV Chicago), Craig Williams, Scott "So Hot" Jameson, Charlie Morriss, Freddie Woods, Mike Dailey, Mike Culotta and JD Pig.

== Programming ==
The station's slogan was updated to "KOMP 92.3, The Rock Station". It is owned by Lotus Communications, which also owns KENO, KLAV, KKGK, KRLV, KWID, KWWN, and KXPT. It is the flagship station for the Las Vegas Raiders of the National Football League alongside KRLV.

In morning drive time, the wake-up show is "BS in the Morning". The current hosts are Graig and Huff. Graig was born in New York City and has been with the program since 2016. Huff was born in Phoenix and was a KOMP DJ since 2011, originally as nighttime host. Sylvia hosts middays and Gooch is heard in afternoons and evenings.

The station launched "BS in the Morning" in the summer of 2014 with radio host Sparks, who relocated to Las Vegas from Cleveland. The show featured Sparks, Graig Salerno and Izzy. BS in the Morning show routines include The Wheel of Punishment, the BS Drunk Line, and I Heard That. The show had its own official day, August 5, 2019, in the City of Las Vegas as declared by Mayor Carolyn Goodman. The now-deceased lead vocalist for Quiet Riot, Kevin DuBrow, co-hosted the morning radio show with long-time morning show host Craig Williams. Other past personalities include Dennis Huff (formerly of KVGS (107.9 FM)).

Specialty shows include Rock Hard with Kristen, a one-hour metal show Saturday nights at midnight. 92 Minutes of Hair with Mel is heard Sunday mornings. The show was originally 92 minutes, but expanded to two hours of 1980s hair bands. On Sunday nights, Laurie Steele voices The Home Grown Show, a show playing material from up-and-coming local artists.
