= KWID =

Spanish-language adult hits radio station in Las Vegas

Coordinates: 35.9455°N 115.0428°W

- Las Vegas, Nevada; United States
- Broadcast area: Las Vegas metropolitan area
- Frequency: 101.9 MHz (HD Radio)
- Branding: La Buena 101.9

Programming
- Format: Spanish Adult Hits

Ownership
- Owner: Lotus Communications; (Lotus Broadcasting Corp.)
- Sister stations: KENO, KKGK, KLAV, KOMP, KRLV, KWWN, KXPT

History
- First air date: 1963 (as KRGN)
- Former call signs: KRGN (1963–1974); KFMS (1974–1980); KFMS-FM (1980–2003)
- Call sign meaning: "Wild 102", former branding under hip-hop format

Technical information
- Licensing authority: FCC
- Facility ID: 55503
- Class: C
- ERP: 47,000 watts
- HAAT: 579 meters (1,900 ft)

Links
- Public license information: Public file; LMS
- Webcast: Listen live
- Website: labuenalv.com

KWID (101.9 FM, "La Buena 101.9") is a commercial radio station that is licensed to Las Vegas, Nevada. The station is owned by Lotus Communications and broadcasts a Spanish-language adult hits format. The KWID studios are located in the unincorporated community of Spring Valley in Clark County and its transmitter is on Black Mountain in Henderson.

Prior to the use of the call letters in Las Vegas, there was an unrelated shortwave radio station called KWID during World War II. Based in San Francisco, the original KWID was commissioned by the federal government to reach an international audience. It served as the basis for what later became the Voice of America radio network.

== History ==
=== Early years ===
The station at 101.9 FM in Las Vegas signed on in 1963 as KRGN with an easy listening format. It took its call sign from its owner, E. W. Cragin. The Gilday Broadcasting Company bought the station in 1968.

In 1974, the station changed its call sign to KFMS and flipped to an automated top 40 format branded "KFM 102". From 1978 to 1980, KFMS was an album-oriented rock outlet. On January 1, 1981, KFMS flipped to a country music format, retaining the "KFM 102" name.

=== Jacor/Clear Channel era (1997-2008) ===
In 1997, Jacor Communications purchased Regent Communications and its stations, including KFMS, for $184.7 million. Jacor subsequently was purchased by Clear Channel Communications in 1999.

On January 7, 2000, at 3 p.m., KFMS flipped to top 40 as "101.9 KISS-FM". KFMS simulcast KIIS-FM in Los Angeles, including Rick Dees' weekday morning program, while Buck Head from WFLZ-FM in Tampa hosted weeknights. The Buck Head Show was later syndicated back to KYSR (Star 98.7) in Los Angeles until he was eventually transferred to that market.

The grouping of KIIS-FM (102.7 FM) in Los Angeles, KIIS (1220 AM) in Santa Clarita, California, KAVS (97.7 FM) in the Antelope Valley, KYHT (105.3 FM) in Barstow/Victor Valley, and KFMS in Las Vegas created nearly continuous coverage of KIIS-FM between Los Angeles and Las Vegas. However, KFMS was branded as "KISS" instead of "KIIS".

Over time, KFMS began adding more local disc jockeys, including Kate and Rick Kelly from KQOL-FM (93.1 FM). After KYHT flipped to hot adult contemporary in 2001, KFMS discontinued its simulcast of KIIS-FM, adjusted its format to include more hip hop music, and added a local morning show hosted by Trejo and Nikki. The station continued to air the nationally syndicated Rick Dees Weekly Top 40 program.

In December 2002, 101.9 Kiss-FM signed off and KFMS began stunting for several days with a loop of "Welcome to the Jungle" by Guns N' Roses. In January 2003, the station debuted a rhythmic contemporary format with the branding "Wild 102" and the slogan "Where Hip Hop Lives"; the call letters changed to KWID. On November 15, 2004, KWID flipped to Mexican oldies as "La Preciosa 101.9".

=== Lotus era (2008-present) ===
In May 2008, Lotus Communications acquired KWID in a three-station swap with Clear Channel. In exchange for KZEP-FM in San Antonio, Lotus also received KBKO-FM in Bakersfield, California. The new owner changed KWID to a Spanish adult hits format, branded "La Buena 101.9".
