= KENO (AM) =

Spanish-language sports station in Las Vegas

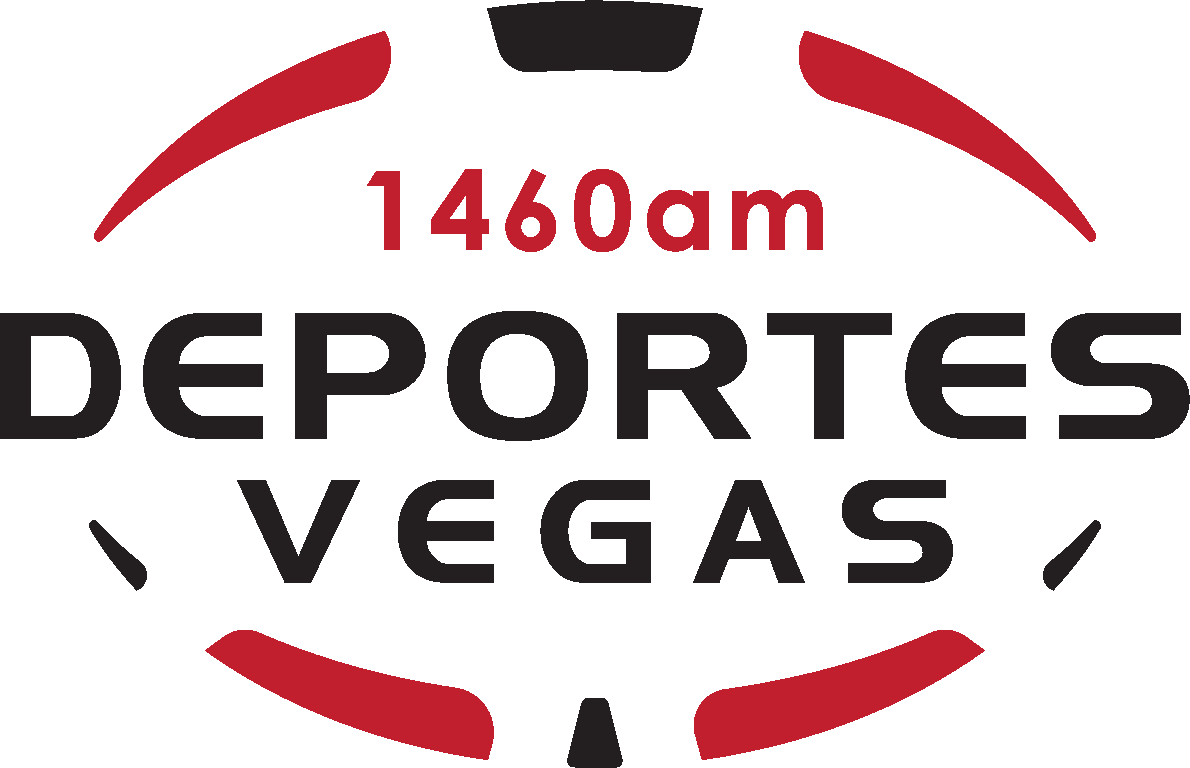

Las Vegas, Nevada; United States
- Broadcast area: Las Vegas Valley
- Frequency: 1460 kHz
- Branding: 1460 Deportes Vegas

Programming
- Language: Spanish
- Format: Sports radio
- Affiliations: TUDN Radio; Las Vegas Lights FC; Las Vegas Raiders; Vegas Golden Knights

Ownership
- Owner: Lotus Communications; (Lotus Broadcasting Corp.)
- Sister stations: KKGK; KLAV; KOMP; KRLV; KWID; KWWN; KXPT

History
- First air date: January 1941
- Former frequencies: 1370 kHz (1941)
- Call sign meaning: The casino game Keno

Technical information
- Licensing authority: FCC
- Facility ID: 38449
- Class: B
- Power: 10,000 watts day 620 watts night
- Transmitter coordinates: 36°11′25″N 115°10′35″W

Links
- Public license information: Public file; LMS
- Website: www.deportesvegas.com

KENO (1460 AM) is a Spanish language sports talk radio station in Las Vegas, Nevada, owned by Lotus Communications. It is affiliated with TUDN Radio.

Its studios are located in the unincorporated community of Spring Valley in Clark County and its transmitter is located northwest of downtown Las Vegas.

== History ==
KENO was one of the area's first radio stations, founded in 1941 by Laura Belle and Maxwell Kelch. (John Heaton had operated KGIX from 1930 to 1935, but low power and limited hours made it unprofitable.) For much of its early history, KENO broadcast out of the El Rancho Vegas on Las Vegas Boulevard. Southern Nevada's first radio show was called "Listen Ladies" and was hosted by Laura Belle Kelch. Listen Ladies provided home and household advice to women in the 1940s.

The station played top 40 from the 1950s to the early 1980s, using the slogan "Music Radio 1460" in the 1960s and 70s. KENO also had an FM station at 92.3, until 1982 when it changed its call sign to KOMP and began playing album-oriented rock. KENO 1460 switched to AC/oldies in the early 1980s and then went to the straight oldies format in the latter part of the decade around 1987 and 1988. The oldies format lasted until 1993.

KENO was originally on 1370 kHz. Under the NARBA treaty of March, 1941 it moved to 1400 kHz. It moved to 1460 kHz in 1951.

Prior to switching to Spanish, KENO was the Las Vegas affiliate of the Jim Rome Show. The station was the flagship station for the Las Vegas 51s, then the Class AAA affiliate of the Los Angeles Dodgers.

On March 3, 2008, the station changed its format to ESPN Deportes Radio, and the previous programming was moved to KBAD 920 kHz. KBAD's programming was moved to 1100 kHz, KWWN. After ESPN Deportes Radio shut down in 2019, its format continued to remain although the station was renamed to "Deportes Vegas". Prior to switching to Spanish, KENO was the Las Vegas affiliate of the Jim Rome Show. The station was the flagship station for the Las Vegas 51s, then the Class AAA affiliate of the Los Angeles Dodgers, with this sports programming moving to a sister station in March 2008 when KENO flipped to ESPN Deportes Radio.

KENO is the flagship station for Spanish-language broadcasts of the Vegas Golden Knights of the National Hockey League. In 2017, an agreement was made for KENO to broadcast select Golden Knights games which made the Golden Knights the third team in the NHL to offer Spanish-language radio broadcasts.

KENO is the flagship station for Spanish-language broadcasts of the Las Vegas Raiders of the National Football League. The station started carrying the games in 2020 and is the flagship for a group of eight stations across Nevada and California carrying Raider games in Spanish.
