= KWWN =

- Las Vegas, Nevada; United States
- Broadcast area: Las Vegas Valley
- Frequency: 1100 kHz
- Branding: ESPN Las Vegas

Programming
- Format: Sports
- Affiliations: ESPN Radio; UNLV Rebels; Las Vegas Aces; Los Angeles Lakers Radio Network

Ownership
- Owner: Lotus Communications; (Lotus Broadcasting Corp.)
- Sister stations: KENO, KKGK, KLAV, KOMP, KRLV, KWID, KXPT

History
- First air date: December 2007; 18 years ago

Technical information
- Licensing authority: FCC
- Facility ID: 137871
- Class: B
- Power: 22,000 watts days 2,000 watts nights
- Transmitter coordinates: 36°12′44.9″N 115°9′48″W
- Translator: 100.9 K265EZ (Henderson)

Links
- Public license information: Public file; LMS
- Webcast: Listen Live
- Website: LVsportsnetwork.com

KWWN (1100 AM) is a commercial radio station licensed to Las Vegas, Nevada, and airing a sports radio format. It is owned by Lotus Communications with studios on West Flamingo Road in Spring Valley while using a Las Vegas address. KWWN carries a mix of local sports shows and ESPN Radio hosts. Live sports heard on KWWN include the UNLV Rebels football and men's basketball teams along with the Las Vegas Aces of the WNBA and the Los Angeles Lakers of the NBA. By day, KWWN is powered at 22,000 watts. But at night, to protect other stations on 1100 AM, a clear channel frequency, KWWN reduces power to 2,000 watts and uses a directional antenna with a four-tower array. The transmitter is off North Martin Luther King Boulevard near West Brooks Avenue in North Las Vegas. Programming is also heard on 35-watt FM translator K265EZ at 100.9 MHz in Henderson. Station 1100 AM is off the air as of October 13th 2026.

== History ==
The station signed on the air in December 2007, after running test transmissions for several months. These tests were crucial for arranging the nighttime directional signal to protect the clear channel frequency from interfering with stations like KNZZ in Colorado and the dominant WTAM in Cleveland, Ohio. While testing, the station ran at half power (10,000 watts day and 1,000 watts night) before signing on at its full authorized power.

Originally, KWWN simulcast the sports format of its sister station, KBAD (920 AM). In 2008, the simulcast ended as Lotus Communications restructured its sports portfolio. KBAD became the local network affiliate of Fox Sports Radio, while KWWN picked up the ESPN Radio affiliation. As part of this realignment, KENO (1460 AM), which had previously carried Fox Sports, joined ESPN Deportes Radio with a Spanish-language sports format. KWWN later became the flagship station of the Las Vegas Aces of the WNBA, and before the 2018–19 season, it was named an affiliate of the Los Angeles Lakers Radio Network.
