= KKGK =

Fox Sports Radio affiliate in Las Vegas

Currently silent
- Las Vegas, Nevada; United States
- Broadcast area: Las Vegas Valley
- Frequency: 1340 kHz
- Branding: Fox Sports Radio Las Vegas

Programming
- Format: Sports
- Affiliations: Fox Sports Radio; Vegas Golden Knights

Ownership
- Owner: Lotus Communications; (Lotus Broadcasting Corp.)
- Sister stations: KENO; KLAV; KRLV; KOMP; KWID; KWWN; KXPT

History
- First air date: 1951 (as KORK)
- Former call signs: KORK (1951–1968); KRAM (1968–1988); KMTW (1988–1995); KRLV (1995–2020)
- Call sign meaning: "Golden Knights"

Technical information
- Licensing authority: FCC
- Facility ID: 40756
- Class: C
- Power: 1,000 watts (day); 880 watts (night)
- Transmitter coordinates: 36°12′46.89″N 115°9′48.01″W
- Translator: 94.7 K234BS (Las Vegas)

Links
- Public license information: Public file; LMS
- Webcast: Listen live
- Website: www.lvsportsnetwork.com/fox-sports-las-vegas-1340-am-947fm/

KKGK (1340 kHz) is a commercial AM radio radio station in Las Vegas, Nevada, United States, serving the Las Vegas area. Owned by Lotus Communications, its studios and offices are located on West Flamingo Road in the unincorporated community of Spring Valley in Clark County. The transmitter is located off North Martin Luther King Boulevard in North Las Vegas. Until going silent in 2026, KKGK aired a sports radio format, mostly carrying Fox Sports Radio.

Programming is also heard on FM translator 94.7 K234BS, which is licensed to Las Vegas, Nevada, and transmits from facilities at the top of The Strat on the Las Vegas Strip.

== History ==
In 1947, a license for a Las Vegas radio station at 1340 kHz was first applied for. It took until 1951 for the station, KORK, to first sign-on. KORK was owned by the Vegas Valley Broadcasting Company, located in the Hotel Thunderbird, and it was powered with 250 watts. It was an affiliate of the NBC Radio Network, broadcasting a schedule of dramas, comedies, news, sports, game shows, soap operas and big band broadcasts. In 1955, it was bought by the Southwestern Broadcasting Company, which put KORK-TV (channel 3, now KSNV) on the air in that same year. In 1961, KORK got an FM counterpart, KORK-FM 97.1 (now KXPT).

In 1968, KORK, airing a full service middle of the road format, moved to 920 kHz (today KRLV). Going to 920 allowed KORK to increase its daytime power to 5,000 watts. Meanwhile, Nevada Broadcasting, Incorporated, acquired the 1340 frequency, and began airing country music as KRAM. At this point, KRAM was powered at 1,000 watts by day, but still had to reduce power to 250 watts at night. It was an affiliate of the ABC Entertainment Radio Network.

In 1985, the station was acquired by Southern Nevada Radio, which changed the call sign to KMTW. By the early 1990s, KMTW had become an all-news station, carrying CNN Headline News.

In 1995, Far West Radio acquired the station. On August 9, the new owner changed its call sign to KRLV. It aired a talk radio format for several years. In 2004, Continental Broadcasting bought the station, putting on a Spanish-language format of music, news and sports.

In August 2012, KRLV and 1230 KLAV were sold to Lotus Communications. In April 2015, KRLV flipped from its Spanish-language format to Fox Sports Radio. The format change gave Lotus four sports-programmed stations in the Las Vegas Valley: KWWN (ESPN Radio), KBAD (NBC Sports Radio), KENO (ESPN Deportes Radio in Spanish), and KRLV. The other sports station in Las Vegas was KXST (CBS Sports Radio.

In April 2017, Lotus acquired the radio rights to the Vegas Golden Knights of the National Hockey League, with KRLV serving as the flagship station. It was also announced that KLAV's FM translator K255CT would switch to a simulcast of KRLV on 98.9 FM. The call sign was changed to KKGK on March 20, 2020; the KRLV call sign moved to the former KBAD.

In December 2025, it was announced that KKGK's FM simulcast would move to 94.7 FM on K234BS on December 18, 2025, swapping signals with KXPT-HD2 (which moved its analog simulcast to 98.9).

Lotus took KKGK silent in September 2026, citing financial issues; the rights to the Golden Knights would move to KVGS.

== Translator ==
Broadcast translator for KKGK
Call sign	Frequency	City of license	FID	ERP (W)	Class	Transmitter coordinates	FCC info
K234BS	94.7 FM	Las Vegas, Nevada	156220	250	D	35°56′45″N 115°2′41″W	LMS
