= KRLV (AM) =

- Las Vegas, Nevada; United States
- Broadcast area: Las Vegas metropolitan area
- Frequency: 920 kHz
- Branding: Raider Nation Radio 920 AM

Programming
- Format: Sports
- Affiliations: Las Vegas Aviators; Las Vegas Raiders; Vegas Stats & Information Network

Ownership
- Owner: Lotus Communications; (Lotus Broadcasting Corp.)
- Sister stations: KENO; KKGK; KLAV; KOMP; KXPT; KWID; KWWN

History
- First air date: 1948 (as KRAM)
- Former call signs: KRAM (1947–1968); KORK (1968–1997); KBAD (1997–2020)
- Call sign meaning: Transposition of Las Vegas Raiders' initials

Technical information
- Licensing authority: FCC
- Facility ID: 38448
- Class: B
- Power: 5,000 watts day; 500 watts night
- Transmitter coordinates: 36°11′24.9″N 115°10′38″W

Links
- Public license information: Public file; LMS
- Webcast: Listen live
- Website: www.lvsportsnetwork.com/raider-nation-radio-920-am/

KRLV (920 kHz) is a commercial AM radio station in Las Vegas, Nevada, United States, serving the Las Vegas area. Owned by Lotus Communications, KRLV airs a sports radio format focused on the Las Vegas Raiders of the National Football League. The station's studios and offices are located in the unincorporated community of Spring Valley in Clark County. A secondary studio is located at the Raiders headquarters and practice facility in Henderson. The transmitter is located off Wild Jan Drive, northwest of downtown Las Vegas.

== History ==
=== Early years as KORK ===
In 1951, the station first signed on as KORK at 1340 kHz. KORK was owned by the Vegas Valley Broadcasting Company, located in the Hotel Thunderbird, and it was powered at 250 watts.

KORK was an affiliate of the NBC Radio Network, broadcasting NBC's schedule of dramas, comedies, news, sports, game shows, soap operas and big band remotes. In 1955, it was bought by the Southwestern Broadcasting Company, which put Channel 3, KORK-TV (later KVBC, now KSNV) on the air in that same year. In 1961 KORK got an FM counterpart, KORK-FM 97.1 (now KXPT).

=== Move to AM 920 ===
In 1968, KORK, airing a full service format featuring middle of the road music, moved to 920 on the AM dial. Going to the 920 spot allowed KORK to increase its daytime power to 5,000 watts and slightly boost its nighttime power to 500 watts. The 920 facility was first licensed in 1948 as KRAM; that call sign concurrently moved to the 1340 license.

During its heyday under the ownership of Donrey Media, KORK was among the most popular stations in Las Vegas for adults. Its lineup included well-known disc jockeys, such as Red McIlvaine, Walt Reno and Ron Murphy.

The simulcast morning drive time newscasts of KORK/KORK-FM in the 1970s kept both stations high in the ratings. During the latter part of the decade, the newsroom was led by news director Bill Buckmaster (later a talk show host at KWFM in Tucson) and included reporters Jackie Glass (now a District Court Judge in Las Vegas) and Steven L. Herman, (currently a Voice of America correspondent in Asia). The trio was frequently heard on NBC Radio Network newscasts. By the early 1980s, KORK became an adult standards station, airing NBC Radio News at the beginning of each hour.

=== Sports KBAD ===
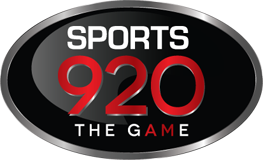
Former logo before the station became an NBC Sports affiliate

KORK changed its call sign to KBAD on April 4, 1997, and began airing an all-sports format. It was known briefly as "K-BAD AM 920".

KBAD was an ESPN Radio affiliate until March 3, 2008, when that programming was transferred to KWWN. It then picked up Fox Sports Radio programming from KENO, which in turn affiliated with ESPN Deportes Radio. KBAD aired The Jim Rome Show until its move to CBS Sports Radio, whose Las Vegas affiliate was KXST.

On July 1, 2013, KBAD switched affiliations to NBC Sports Radio and rebranded as "920 The Game". On August 5, 2019, KBAD became one of the first terrestrial radio stations in the country dedicated entirely to sports betting, as the station became an affiliate of The BetR Network.

=== As KRLV ===
The call sign was changed to KRLV on March 20, 2020; the call sign was transferred from its sister station on 1340, now KKGK.

On July 27, 2020, Lotus Communications announced that KRLV and KOMP would become the new flagship stations of the Las Vegas Raiders of the NFL after the team moved, and that KRLV would relaunch with a new on-air lineup as Raider Nation Radio. The new lineup and branding launched on August 3, 2020, including a morning show co-hosted by Clay Baker and Mike Pritchard, a show hosted by the Raiders lead beat writer at the Las Vegas Review-Journal and Lincoln Kennedy, a show hosted by J. T. the Brick, and a weekly show hosted by the team's head coach. The former "The Game" programming moved to KLAV. On January 11, 2021, the station added The Rich Eisen Show after dropping Mike Greenberg's show Greeny after it moved to a new timeslot. The second and third hours of the show are carried. Alongside the Raiders, the station is also the flagship station of the Las Vegas Aviators radio network and carries select games from the Sports USA Radio Network. The station otherwise features programming from SportsMap and the Vegas Stats & Information Network.

== Former programming ==
In the 2019–20 season, KBAD broadcast UNLV Rebels baseball and UNLV Lady Rebels basketball games. The station was previously an affiliate for the San Diego Chargers and was the flagship station of the former Arena Football League's Las Vegas Gladiators before they moved to Cleveland, Ohio. KRLV also carried XFL games of the Vegas Vipers games. Boxing analyst Al Bernstein once had a weekday show on KBAD.
