= KXPT =

Coordinates: 35.967°N 115.502°W

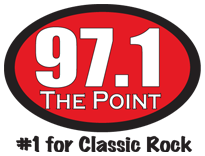
- Las Vegas, Nevada; United States
- Broadcast area: Las Vegas Valley
- Frequency: 97.1 MHz (HD Radio)
- Branding: 97.1 The Point

Programming
- Format: Classic rock
- Subchannels: HD2: 98.9 Hank FM (classic country)

Ownership
- Owner: Lotus Communications; (Lotus Broadcasting Corp.)
- Sister stations: KENO; KKGK; KOMP; KRLV; KWID; KWWN

History
- First air date: November 29, 1961 (as KORK-FM)
- Former call signs: KORK-FM (1961–1983); KEER (1983–1984); KYRK (1984–1993)
- Call sign meaning: For "The Point"

Technical information
- Licensing authority: FCC
- Facility ID: 38450
- Class: C
- ERP: 25,000 watts
- HAAT: 1,120 meters (3,670 ft)
- Translator: HD2: 98.9 K255CT (Henderson)

Links
- Public license information: Public file; LMS
- Webcast: Listen live; HD2: Listen live
- Website: www.point97.com; HD2: www.hanklv.com

KXPT (97.1 FM) is a commercial radio station located in Las Vegas, Nevada. The station is owned by Lotus Communications and it airs a classic rock music format branded as "97.1 The Point".

KXPT's studios and offices are in the unincorporated community of Spring Valley in Clark County and its transmitter is on Potosi Mountain southwest of the Las Vegas Valley.

== History ==
=== KORK-FM (1961–1983) ===
On November 29, 1961, the station first signed on as KORK-FM. At first it simulcast its AM counterpart, KORK (1340 AM). But by the 1970s, under Donrey Media, it had switched to a beautiful music format, playing mostly instrumental versions of popular songs. At the time, it could only be heard in and around Las Vegas, broadcasting from a tower only 195 feet (59 m) in height above average terrain. But by the early 1980s, it got a boost in power to 50,000 watts and an increase in antenna height to 1,950 feet (590 m).

=== Top 40 (1983–1993) ===
In 1983, the station changed its call letters to KEER. A year later in 1984, it switched formats to Top 40 as KYRK "Y-97." In the late 1980s, the slogan changed to "POWER 97". Some of the KYRK DJs included Pat Garret, Anthony Miles, Shaun St John, "Wild Child" Johnny West, Don "Action" Jackson, Harmon and Holiday, Dr. Jerry Thomas, Greg Spin, James and The J Man. The station was known for the "Tookie-Tookie Bird" which was the cue to call in and win prizes. The bird appeared at local events, and was mocked on an episode of Cheap Seats which featured the mascot appearing at a 1986 International Roller Derby event televised by ESPN at the Showboat Hotel & Casino.

=== Adult alternative (1993–1997) ===
In 1993, Lotus Broadcasting purchased the station and switched call letters to KXPT "The Point". For the first four and a half years, The Point aired an adult album alternative (AAA) format, playing new artists who went onto big careers, including Sheryl Crow, the Dave Matthews Band, Blues Traveler, Jewel and others. Original Point DJs included Chris Foxx, Mike Fox, Rob Landry and JD, Byrd (now with WDRV Chicago), Lark Williams, Dusty Street, Randy Morrison and Mike O'Brian (now at rival KKLZ).

=== Classic hits (1997–2005) ===
In 1997 the station shifted to a classic hits format, keeping "The Point" name.

=== Classic rock (2005–present) ===
In 2005, it moved to a classic rock format. In 2007 KXPT became the only classic rock station in the Las Vegas Metro as KKLZ changed to a classic hits format.

Current DJs on the station include "Foxx & Mackenzie" (Chris Foxx and Steph Mackenzie), Lark Williams (formerly of KOMP), and Lorrin Bond. KXPT is unusual for a classic rock station, in that all of its weekday shows are either hosted or co-hosted by women. Mike Culotta, formerly of KOMP, was a DJ on the station until his death in December 2010 (though he did not appear on the air in the months prior to his passing).

The signal was once rebroadcast on a translator at 99.3 MHz in Henderson with the call sign K257BU; this translator then moved to 98.9 MHz and to broadcast the sports radio format of KKGK.

== HD Radio ==
On March 17, 2025, KXPT launched a classic country format on its HD2 subchannel, branded as "94.7 Hank FM", simulcast on translator K234BS (94.7 FM). "Hank FM" and KKGK swapped translators on December 18, 2025; the classic country format remained on KXPT-HD2, but moved to K255CT (98.9 FM) in Henderson as "98.9 Hank FM".
