= KVGS =

- Meadview, Arizona; United States
- Broadcast area: Mohave County, Arizona; Clark County, Nevada
- Frequency: 107.9 MHz (HD Radio)
- Branding: X107.9

Programming
- Format: Alternative rock
- Affiliations: Vegas Golden Knights; Henderson Silver Knights

Ownership
- Owner: Beasley Broadcast Group; (Beasley Media Group Licenses, LLC)
- Sister stations: KCYE; KKLZ; KOAS

History
- First air date: 1991
- Former call signs: KLUK (1989–2000); KVGS (2000–2022); KCYE (2022-2025)
- Call sign meaning: K-Vegas

Technical information
- Licensing authority: FCC
- Facility ID: 25752
- Class: C
- ERP: 100,000 watts (horizontal)
- HAAT: 542.8 meters (1,781 ft) (horizontal)
- Transmitter coordinates: 35°50′11.8″N 114°19′16.9″W
- Repeaters: 102.7 KCYE-HD2 (Boulder City, Nevada); 107.9 KVGS-FM1 (Henderson, Nevada)

Links
- Public license information: Public file; LMS
- Website: x1079.com

KVGS (107.9 FM, "X107.9") is a radio station licensed to serve Meadview, Arizona. It is owned by Beasley Broadcast Group, and broadcasts an alternative rock format. KVGS is the flagship station of the nationally syndicated weekday program Dave and Mahoney.

The station's studios are located in the unincorporated Clark County area of Spring Valley, while its transmitter is southwest of Lake Mead in Arizona. A fill-in transmitter atop The Strat provides additional coverage in Las Vegas proper.

== History ==
=== Rhythmic (2002–2005) ===
Under former ownership of the locally based Desert Sky Media (which also owned KOAS, then a smooth jazz station), the station was V-108, launched in 2002 at first as a Rhythmic Top 40 formatted station. Months later, due to a fierce competition with heritage KLUC and the newly launched KVEG, it shifted to an urban adult contemporary format and carried the Tom Joyner Morning Show and the Michael Baisden show. It was moderately successful but it only lasted for three years.

=== Alternative (2005–2011) ===
Riviera Broadcast Group acquired both KVGS and KOAS from Desert Sky, and flipped KVGS on October 21, 2005, to an alternative-based radio station (with a slight lean towards adult album alternative) as Area 108 (Area 107-9 as of October 2007). In September 2009, it re-branded again as 107-9 The Alternative.

=== Adult hits (2011–2015) ===
On October 20, 2011, soon after Beasley Broadcast Group bought the station and KOAS, KVGS ended its alternative rock format and flipped to adult hits as 107.9 Bob-FM. This returned the format to Las Vegas since KKJJ flipped from Jack FM to a simulcast of KXNT as KXNT-FM.

=== Hot adult contemporary (2015–2022) ===
On January 12, 2015, at 3 pm, after a skit depicting Bob "selling" the station (and "selling" its library of 1980s music to sister station KKLZ) because he was leaving Las Vegas, the station flipped to hot adult contemporary as Star 107.9. The new format competes primarily with the market leading KMXB. In July, the station subsequently picked up former KMXB morning host Mark DiCiero, but he left the station in March 2016. KVGS then picked up the syndicated "Brooke & Jubal in the Morning" from KQMV in Seattle in July 2016.

=== Country (2022–2025) ===
On June 17, 2022, it was announced that KVGS and KCYE would swap formats and call signs at 10 a.m. on June 24, with KVGS' hot adult contemporary format being relaunched as "102.7 VGS", and KCYE's country music format, branded "Coyote Country", moving to 107.9.

=== Return to Hot AC (2025-2026) ===
On November 4, 2025, Beasley announced that KCYE and KVGS would revert to their pre-2022 frequencies on November 13 at Midnight, with 107.9 set to revert to their previous hot adult contemporary format, though now with the previous branding of 102.7's iteration as "107-9 VGS". This would ultimately prove to be a buffer format for 107.9 FM.

=== Assumption of KXTE's alternative rock format (2026-) ===
On August 3, 2026, Beasley announced it would sell the license of sister station KXTE to K-Love, Inc., and concurrently announced their alternative rock format and "X" branding would be moved to KVGS upon the sale closure, returning alternative rock to the frequency after 15 years. The two stations began simulcasting on September 14, 2026, at midnight, and KXTE officially became a K-Love affiliate on October 1, 2026.

Following this move, the relaunched station would become the new flagship station for the Vegas Golden Knights following a deal announced by Beasley; as part of this deal, the station also now carries their daily VGK Insider Show hosted by Daren Millard 5-6PM weekdays, as well as all pre/post-game broadcasts and all non-conflicting game broadcasts of their American Hockey League affiliate the Henderson Silver Knights, with all conflicting Henderson games moved to KKLZ-HD2.

== Repeater ==
Call sign	Frequency	City of license	FID	ERP (W)	Class	Transmitter coordinates	FCC info
KVGS-FM1	107.9 FM	Henderson, Nevada	132722	2500	D	36°8′54.8″N 115°9′18.0″W	LMS

== Gallery ==
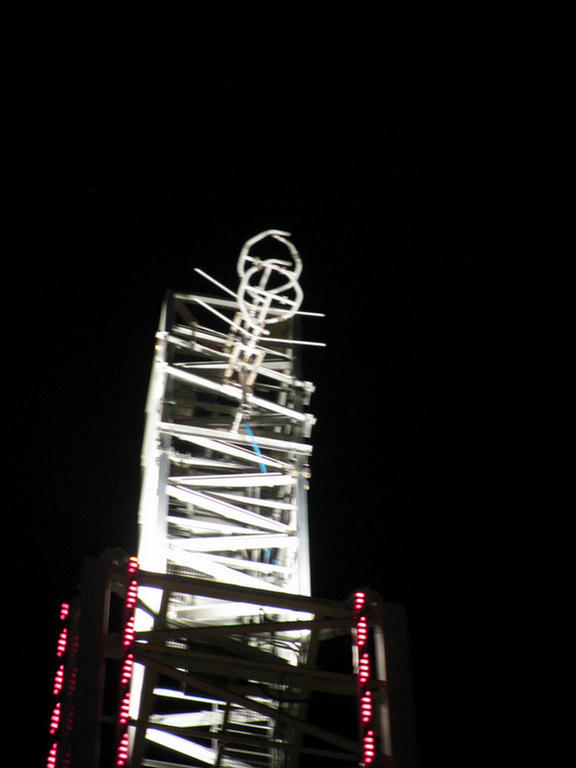
KOAS-FM1 and KVGS-FM1 transmitting antenna atop The Stratosphere, March 2010.

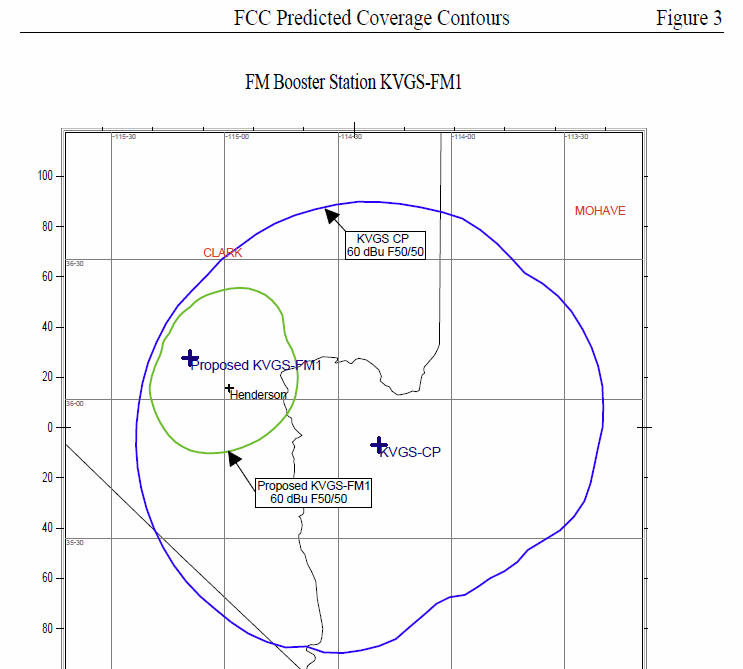
KVGS-FM1 coverage in comparison of the main KVGS(FM) transmitter.
