= K280DD =

Relays HD2 subchannel of KVGK, Las Vegas
- Las Vegas, Nevada; United States
- Broadcast area: Las Vegas, Nevada
- Frequency: 103.9 MHz
- Branding: Real 103.9

Programming
- Format: Urban contemporary
- Affiliations: Premiere Networks; United Stations Radio Networks; KSNV (traffic updates)

Ownership
- Owner: Advance Ministries of Lake Havasu
- Operator: iHeartMedia
- Sister stations: KSNE-FM, KWNR, KYMT

History
- First air date: August 29, 2015

Technical information
- Licensing authority: FCC
- Facility ID: 1686504
- Class: D
- ERP: 250 watts
- HAAT: 308 meters
- Transmitter coordinates: 36.1474°N 115.1555°W

Links
- Public license information: Public file; LMS
- Webcast: Listen Live
- Website: real1039.iheart.com

K280DD (103.9 FM, Real 103.9) is an FM translator station licensed to cover Las Vegas, Nevada. It rebroadcasts an urban contemporary format from the HD2 subchannel of KVGK. The station, which was launched on September 4, 2015, is owned by Advance Ministries of Lake Havasu and operated by iHeartMedia. It specializes in current-based Hip-Hop and R&B hits, marking the first time since 2001 that the Las Vegas radio market had a Mainstream Urban outlet since KVEG shifted to Rhythmic Top 40 in 2002, and for whom they are targeting. On the same day it launched, rival CBS Radio flipped the FM portion of News/Talk KXNT-FM to Rhythmic Hot AC as "Q100.5" to serve as a flanker for sister station KLUC, whom "Real 103.9" is also targeting. By March 2019, "Real 103.9" began transitioning to a Rhythmic contemporary direction due to its focus on hit-driven Hip-Hop currents.

The station transmits from atop The Strat casino, along the Las Vegas Strip.
