= KMZQ =

KMZQ may refer to:

- KMZQ (AM), a radio station (670 AM) licensed to serve Las Vegas, Nevada, United States
- KEMP, a radio station (99.3 FM) licensed to serve Payson, Arizona, United States, which held the call signs KMZQ or KMZQ-FM from 2005 to 2014
- KXQQ-FM, a radio station (100.5 FM) licensed to serve Henderson, Nevada, which held the call sign KMZQ-FM from 1981 to 2005
