= KXNT =

KXNT may refer to:

- KXNT (AM), a radio station (840 AM) licensed to North Las Vegas, Nevada, United States
- KXQQ-FM, a radio station (100.5 FM) licensed to Henderson, Nevada, which held the call sign KXNT-FM from 2010 to 2015
