= KDWN =

Radio station in Las Vegas, Nevada (1975–2023)

Defunct on AM 720
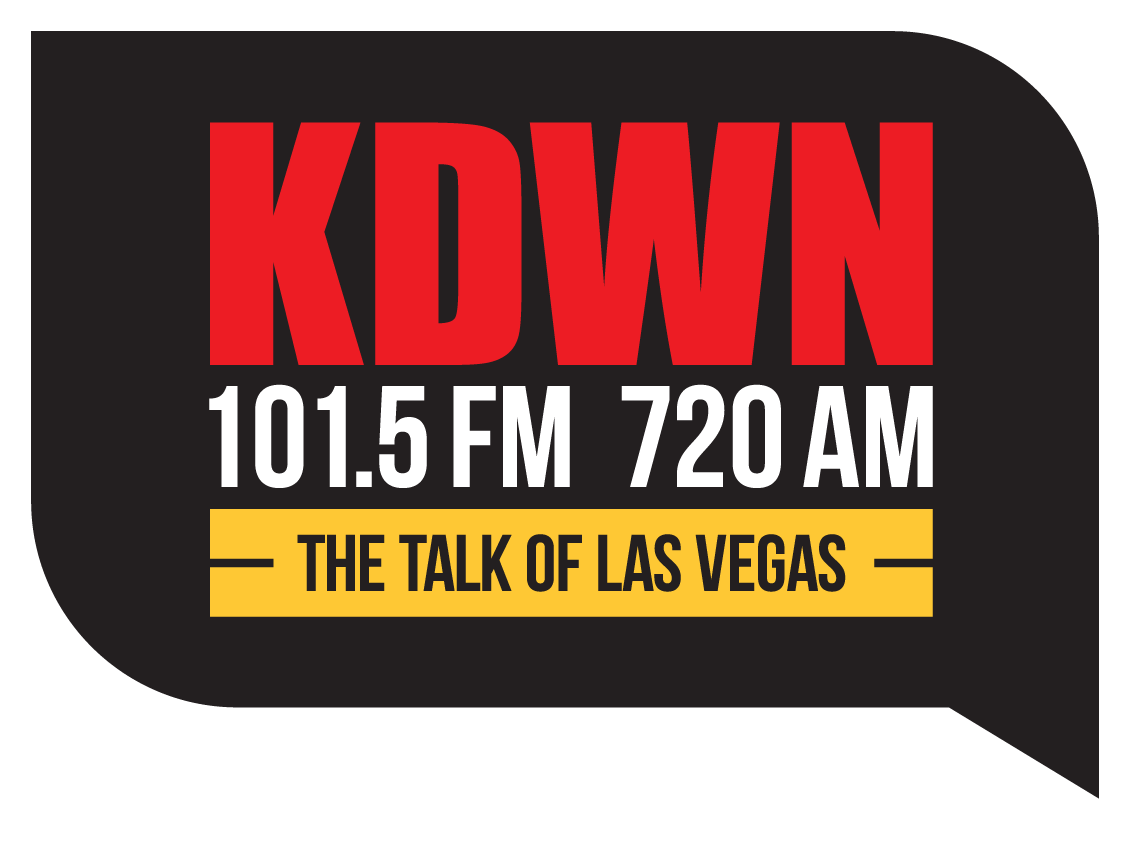
- Las Vegas, Nevada; United States
- Broadcast area: Las Vegas Valley
- Frequency: 720 kHz
- Branding: 101.5 FM 720 AM KDWN

Programming
- Format: Talk radio and brokered programming
- Affiliations: Fox News Radio; Compass Media Networks; Genesis Communications Network; Premiere Networks; Westwood One; KSNV weather coverage

Ownership
- Owner: Audacy, Inc.; (Audacy License, LLC, as Debtor-in-Possession)
- Sister stations: KLUC-FM; KMXB; KXNT; KXQQ-FM; KXST

History
- First air date: April 7, 1975
- Last air date: March 1, 2023 (on AM 720)
- Former call signs: KQRX (1972-75; CP)
- Call sign meaning: "Dawn"

Technical information
- Licensing authority: FCC
- Facility ID: 54686
- Class: B
- Power: 25,000 watts day; 7,500 watts night
- Transmitter coordinates: 36°16′3.89″N 115°2′45.01″W
- Translators: 101.5 K268CS (Las Vegas, relays KMXB-HD3)
- Repeater: 94.1 KMXB-HD3 (Henderson)

Links
- Public license information: Public file; LMS
- Webcast: Listen live (via Audacy)
- Website: www.audacy.com/kdwn

KDWN (720 AM) was a commercial radio station in Las Vegas, Nevada, owned and operated by Audacy, Inc. The station pronounced its call letters as "K-Dawn". The station's studios were located in the unincorporated Clark County area of Spring Valley. Programming was also heard on 250-watt FM translator station K268CS on 101.5 MHz. KDWN aired a talk radio format. It ran several nationally syndicated conservative talk hosts, along with local shows, most of which were brokered programming. National hosts included Brian Kilmeade, Sean Hannity and Mark Levin. Other hours were devoted to money, health, real estate and sports. In most cases, the local hosts paid for their time on the air and were permitted to run their own advertising. Most hours on weekdays began with world and national news from Fox News Radio. A local staff provided Nevada news, weather and traffic. Weather coverage was supplied by NBC Network affiliate KSNV.

KDWN's original 50,000-watt transmitter was on Galleria Drive in Henderson, and was nondirectional in the day and used three inline towers to produce a directional night signal nulled toward WGN on the same channel in Chicago. In 2020, it moved to a new site shared with KXST on North Sloan Lane in North Las Vegas. KDWN broadcast with 25,000 watts during daytime hours and 7,500 watts at night, still protecting WGN with an asymmetrical three-tower pattern. While the original nighttime signal could be heard throughout most of the Western United States, north into Canada and south into Mexico, the new signal had less coverage but was more economical, continuing to cover the local area using less spent power. KDWN also served as Southern Nevada's primary entry point station for the Emergency Alert System.

KDWN broadcast, along with KXST, ceased operations on March 1, 2023. The station's previous programming and branding continues to be heard on K268CS and KMXB-HD3.

== History ==
=== From music station to talk radio ===
KDWN first came on the air on April 7, 1975. It was founded by A.J. Williams and Jack Reeder. Williams owned KTYM-AM-FM in Inglewood, California, and also owned television station KAIL in Fresno. Reeder was the chief engineer of KRLA in Los Angeles. Reeder died, leaving his half of the station to Williams, who owned the station until his death in 2005.

The station began by broadcasting a full service format of middle of the road music, news, sports and talk. The music format lasted longer on KDWN than on most AM radio stations of the day. In the 1970s, many AM stations were leaving music formats to FM, and switching over to talk programming. From 1978 to 1985, KDWN also was hosting sports talk at night, with 'The Stardust Line' on Sunday nights. 'The Stardust Line', broadcasting from The Stardust Resort and Casino, was hosted by Lee Pete and NFL football great Jim Brown. For West Coast sports fans, KDWN was the first early source for betting lines and sports information from Nevada.

KDWN's transition from music to talk began slowly. In the late 1970s, KDWN aired a mix of music and some talk during the day. In January 1980, KDWN began broadcasting talk around the clock. KDWN was the top news/talk outlet in the Las Vegas radio market and won an award for its coverage of the 1980 MGM Grand Fire.

Unlike most Las Vegas-area stations, KDWN remained locally owned, even as most of its competitors were bought out by large radio corporations such as Clear Channel Communications and Infinity Broadcasting. The continuity of ownership kept a consistent style of station sound. The station continued to rely on experienced, yet older, hosts who may have had been with the station since it began broadcasting in the talk radio format. The station did well in the ratings as one of the first generation of talk radio stations. Call screening was not used until recently.

=== Art Bell and Rush Limbaugh ===
Noted radio talk host Art Bell, after minor jobs at several California radio and TV stations, began hosting an all-night show on KDWN in 1983. KDWN had just been granted permission from the Federal Communications Commission (FCC) to increase its nighttime power from 10,000 watts to 50,000 watts. KDWN was now audible with a good radio between nighttime and dawn in Los Angeles, San Francisco and around the West Coast. Bell called the show "West Coast AM" because it aired between 1 and 6 a.m. Pacific Time.

Bell began by discussing mostly politics. But he increasingly added discussions of the paranormal and conspiracy theories to the program, resulting in increased ratings and national attention. The show got nationwide syndication in 1993, when it was renamed Coast to Coast AM. Bell did the show from the Plaza Hotel, where KDWN had studios. Later it moved to a studio in his home in nearby Pahrump, Nevada, in Nye County. Eventually KDWN, no longer in control of the program, decided not to continue carrying it in syndication and it was picked up by rival Las Vegas talk station KXNT.

KDWN was one of the first radio stations to carry Rush Limbaugh's nationally syndicated show in 1988. Limbaugh helped boost KDWN's midday ratings. In 1996, with the rates to carry it increasing, KDWN decided not to renew the show. Like Coast to Coast AM, The Rush Limbaugh Show moved to KXNT. KDWN produced and broadcast a local morning show, The Snoozebusters, from the early 1980s until 2006. It was hosted by Ken Stahl and Hart Kirsch.

=== Beasley Broadcasting acquisition, trade to Audacy ===
In March 2006, Beasley Broadcast Group, a Naples, Florida–based company, announced plans to buy the station for $17 million. A Las Vegas newspaper reported a rumor that KDWN would change to an all-sports format, effective July 1, 2006, although the switch did not happen. Host Jim Dallas reported on Wake Up, America on July 21, 2006, that audience backlash against the change forced Beasley to retain the talk radio format.

In the fall of 2006, Beasley introduced a morning drive time news and information show hosted by Heidi Harris, with the remainder of its weekday talk format consisting of nationally syndicated shows and local brokered programming. Harris' show was discontinued in 2012, with the nationally syndicated Laura Ingraham show moved into the morning time slot which was later discontinued. Harris had also been heard on KDWN from 1988 to 1998.

In June 2017, the Oakland Raiders, in preparation for their relocation to Las Vegas, announced that a two–year deal had been reached with the Beasley Broadcast Group to carry Raiders games on KDWN and FM sister station KCYE, starting with the 2017 NFL season. In 2019, the team moved their broadcasts to KYMT.

On October 6, 2022, Beasley Broadcasting announced a station swap with Audacy, Inc., wherein Beasley would swap ownership of KDWN to Audacy in exchange for ownership of KXTE.

=== End of transmission ===
On February 13, 2023, Audacy announced that KDWN would be signing off on March 1, while the translator would remain on air with the same programming. In November 2022, Audacy sold the land that the AM transmitter sat on for $40 million. KDWN was diplexed with KXST near the Las Vegas Motor Speedway; on the same day, Audacy also announced that KXST would also go dark.

With the station signing off, KXNT replaced KDWN as the primary entry point in Southern Nevada for the Emergency Alert System. KDWN's programming remains available on K268CS (101.5 FM), which is fed via KMXB-HD3.

On March 1, 2023, at midnight, following the station's broadcast of Audacy-based podcast Perilous World Radio, the station gave a final message redirecting listeners to the FM signal or Audacy app, as well as the station's brief retrospective, then played the state anthem, "Home Means Nevada", as sung by The Killers (a live recording from October 19, 2010), then a station ID before concluding with the Star-Spangled Banner as performed by Alabama, a picture of the transmitter sites transmitted using slow-scan television, and a series of Q code messages ending with "KDWN QRT", the latter portion the Q code signal to end transmission. KDWN remained on the air with a dead air transmission in anticipation of a final additional DX test scheduled for March 2, prior to the station's final sign off at midnight on March 2, 2023.

On September 21, 2023, KDWN and sister station KXST filed applications with the FCC to relocate the two stations' towers and return to the air. The planned move–to the towers already used by KXNT–did not take place, and the stations would not return to the air within a year of shutting down; (Note: KXNT would itself lose its tower site and close down in 2026.) on March 11, 2024, Audacy submitted an application to cancel the license. The FCC cancelled it on March 22, 2024.
