= KCEP (FM) =

Urban contemporary public radio station in Las Vegas

Coordinates: 36.0086°N 115.0069°W

- Las Vegas, Nevada; United States
- Broadcast area: Las Vegas Valley
- Frequency: 88.1 MHz (HD Radio)
- Branding: Power 88

Programming
- Format: Urban contemporary; Community radio
- Affiliations: American Urban Radio Networks; NPR

Ownership
- Owner: Economic Opportunity Board of Clark County

History
- First air date: October 7, 1972
- Call sign meaning: "Economic Opportunity"

Technical information
- Licensing authority: FCC
- Class: C1
- ERP: 10,000 watts
- HAAT: 364 meters (1,194 ft)

Links
- Public license information: Public file; LMS
- Website: power88lv.com

KCEP (88.1 MHz) is a non-commercial FM radio station licensed to Las Vegas, Nevada, United States. It airs an urban contemporary format branded as "Power 88". Owned by the Economic Opportunity Board of Clark County, Nevada, studios are located on West Washington Avenue, off Interstate 15 in Las Vegas.

The transmitter is on Black Mountain in Henderson.

== History ==
KCEP signed on the air on October 7, 1972. It began broadcasting at only 10 watts, with studios at 900 West Owens Avenue.

After a power boost, the station has been able to thrive in the Las Vegas market serving the African American community since its launch. Its mission statement says KCEP is to engage, entertain and inform its listeners by providing news, music and public affairs. Under this direction, KCEP has been a non-commercial alternative to Las Vegas' mainstream commercial stations that play similar music such as KXQQ, KVGQ and KVEG.

The owners of KCEP, the Economic Opportunity Board of Clark County (or EOBCC), a Community Action Agency, leased Westside School in 1975 and began a major restoration. The old schoolhouse, which is listed in the National Register of Historic Places, houses KCEP and EOBCC.

In the mid-1980s, future hitmaker and pop singer Dino served as program director. In the 2010s, it carried the syndicated Michael Baisden show in the afternoons. Other syndicated programming included the Bobby Jones Gospel Countdown from AURN and Tell Me More with Michel Martin from NPR.

== Programming ==
KCEP plays a mix of R&B, Hip Hop, Classic Soul, Old School, Urban Gospel and Blues. In late mornings, it also airs talk shows aimed at the community. Weekly programs are hosted by Al B. Sure, Will Downing and other well-known R&B and jazz musicians. KCEP also carries some programs from National Public Radio.

== See also ==
- List of community radio stations in the United States
