= KXST =

Radio station in North Las Vegas, Nevada (1956–2023)

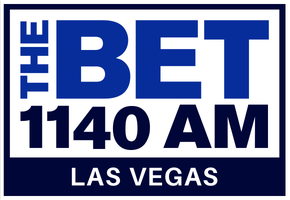
- North Las Vegas, Nevada; United States
- Broadcast area: Las Vegas metropolitan area
- Frequency: 1140 kHz

Programming
- Format: Sports radio and sports betting

Ownership
- Owner: Audacy, Inc.; (Audacy License, LLC, as Debtor-in-Possession)
- Sister stations: KDWN; KLUC-FM; KMXB; KXNT; KXQQ-FM

History
- First air date: 1956 (as KRBO)
- Last air date: March 1, 2023
- Former call signs: KRBO (1956–1962); KLUC (1962–1978); KMJJ (1978–1987); KRSR (1987–1989); KLUC (1989–1993); KXNO (1993–1997); KSFN (1997–2009); KYDZ (2009–2013)
- Former frequencies: 1050 kHz (1956-1967)
- Call sign meaning: "Sports Talk"

Technical information
- Licensing authority: FCC
- Facility ID: 47745
- Class: B
- Power: 10,000 watts day; 2,500 watts night
- Transmitter coordinates: 36°16′4.89″N 115°2′44.01″W

Links
- Public license information: Public file; LMS

KXST (1140 AM) was a commercial radio station licensed to North Las Vegas, Nevada, and broadcasting to the Las Vegas metropolitan area. The station was owned by Audacy, Inc. It aired a sports radio and sports betting format, primarily from the co-owned BetQL Network and CBS Sports Radio. That programming continues on 98.5 KLUC-FM-HD2, also owned by Audacy.

KXST's transmitter was near Nellis Air Force Base and Interstate 15, on East Tropical Parkway; the sale of the site is a factor in the station's closure. Its transmitter power output was 10,000 watts by day, using a non-directional antenna. Because AM 1140 is a clear channel frequency reserved for XEMR in Monterrey, Mexico, and WRVA in Richmond, Virginia, KXST reduced its power to 2,500 watts and used a directional antenna at night.

== History ==
=== First years on 1050 AM ===
In 1956, the station first signed on as KRBO. It was owned by Rainbow, Incorporated, hence the call sign. The station's original city of license was Las Vegas, and it broadcast on 1050 kHz. Because there is a Class I-A station on 1050, XEG in Monterrey, Mexico, with 150,000 watts, KRBO was limited to only 250 watts and was a daytimer, required to be off the air at sunset.

=== Move to 1140 AM ===
The station was acquired by Meyer Gold, who relocated the studios to the New Frontier Hotel and Casino, changing the call sign to KLUC, for "Luck". Gold was able to get the Federal Communications Commission (FCC) to allow a move to 1140 kHz in the late 1960s. That was coupled with a boost to 1,000 watts and eventual full-time broadcasting.

In the past, AM 1140 ran a variety of formats, including adult contemporary in the 1970s and mid-1980s as KMJJ, heavy metal The Crusher from 1987 to 1990, and then an AM simulcast of co-owned KLUC-FM. In 1993, the station switched to a tourist information service branded as KXNO Casino Radio, which carried a loop of advertising for shows, casinos and hotels in Las Vegas.

=== Sports and hot talk ===
In 1996, the station was acquired by American Radio Systems, and flipped to sports talk radio as KSFN The Fan, featuring play-by-play of UNLV Rebels college basketball, Arizona Diamondbacks baseball, and Oakland Raiders football. The station was not very popular, failing to register on Arbitron ratings. In 1999, KSFN flipped to an oldies format branded as Crusin' Oldies, with a focus on music from the late-1950s and early 1960s, primarily targeting the region's baby boomer demographic.

In 2001, KSFN flipped to a talk format as Hot Talk 1140, with a lineup featuring programs including Tom Leykis, Phil Hendrie, and Opie & Anthony. In January 2005, the station re-branded as Spike 1140 AM, a brand extension of the then co-owned, male-oriented cable channel Spike. The station added sports programming, including an affiliation with Sporting News Radio. It also began carrying Los Angeles Dodgers baseball (the team claims southern Nevada within its territory).

=== Back to sports ===
On April 14, 2008, KSFN returned to an all-sports format. It dropped Leykis, and did not pick up the Mike O'Meara Show after the retirement of Don Geronimo from the Don and Mike Show. At the same time, the station added Dan Patrick and expanded programming from Sporting News Radio while retaining Opie & Anthony and the Dodgers. The new format also included local personalities Casey Freelove and Corey Olson hosting "Freelove and Olson" weeknights 7-9pm and Saturdays 1-4pm.

Beginning in August 2008, KSFN also gained the rights to be the official Las Vegas station for USC Trojans football in Las Vegas and began carrying the Sports USA Radio Network NFL doubleheader.

=== KYDZ Radio, return to sports ===
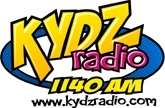
Former KYDZ logo used from 2009 to 2013.

On March 2, 2009, the station changed its call sign to KYDZ and flipped to a children's radio format branded as KYDZ Radio, focusing on teen pop and other songs oriented towards tweens. At 9:01 p.m. Pacific Time on January 1, 2013, KYDZ returned to sports talk as an owned-and-operated outlet of the newly established CBS Sports Radio Network. The station's final song as KYDZ Radio was "I Wanna Be SpongeBob" by AM2.

=== Entercom/Audacy ownership ===
On February 2, 2017, CBS Radio announced it would merge with Entercom. The merger was approved on November 9, 2017, and was consummated on November 17.

In August 2017, a reporter from KLAS-TV obtained an internal e-mail that instructed all of CBS's radio stations in Las Vegas, including KXST, to not cover or otherwise acknowledge the city's new National Hockey League team, the Vegas Golden Knights, on any platform as retaliation for having been outbid by competitor KRLV for rights to be the team's flagship radio station. Following the reports, CBS Radio Las Vegas senior vice president Tony Perlongo apologized to the team and told The Washington Post that he had reversed the policy, stating that it was an "error in judgement on our part", and that CBS Radio would "cover the team, first and foremost on Sports Radio 1140 and on our music and news/talk stations as it makes sense for those formats and audiences."

On June 21, 2021, KXST changed its format from CBS Sports Radio to sports gambling, branded as "The Bet Las Vegas", with programming from the BetQL Network. CBS Sports Radio programming remained in non-prime timeslots.

=== End of transmission ===
On February 13, 2023, Audacy announced that KXST would be signing off on March 1, 2023. In November 2022, Audacy sold the land that the AM transmitter sat on for $40 million in an area currently being developed for industrial warehouse uses; KXST was diplexed with KDWN near the Las Vegas Motor Speedway. KXST's BetQL schedule was simulcast on the second HD Radio channel of KLUC-FM, and that station continues to carry the network. Both KXST and KDWN signed off at midnight on February 28, 2023; in the case of KXST, the change on-air was signaled by the station cutting off the beginning of CBS Sports Radio's "After Hours" show, abruptly switching over to "The Star-Spangled Banner" as performed by Chris Stapleton at Super Bowl LVII. The station then concluded its broadcasting activities with the hourly station ID, followed by a picture of the transmitter sites transmitted by slow scan television, and a series of Q code messages ending with "KXST QRT", the latter portion the Q code signal to end transmission.

On September 21, 2023, KXST and sister station KDWN filed applications with the FCC to relocate the two stations' towers and return to the air. The planned move–to the towers already used by KXNT–did not take place, and the stations would not return to the air within a year of shutting down; (Note: KXNT would itself lose its tower site and close down in 2026.) on March 11, 2024, Audacy submitted an application to cancel the KXST license. The FCC cancelled it on March 22, 2024.
