= KCYE =

Coordinates: 35.946°N 115.044°W

- Boulder City, Nevada; United States
- Broadcast area: Las Vegas metropolitan area
- Frequency: 102.7 MHz (HD Radio)
- Branding: 102.7 Coyote Country

Programming
- Format: Country music
- Subchannels: HD2: KVGS simulcast

Ownership
- Owner: Beasley Broadcast Group, Inc.; (Beasley Media Group Licenses, LLC)
- Sister stations: KKLZ, KOAS, KVGS, KXTE

History
- First air date: 1995 (as KQOL at 105.5)
- Former call signs: KQOL (1995–1998); KQOL-FM (8/1998–9/1998); KSTJ (1998–2007); KFRH (2007–2009); KCYE (2009–2022); KVGS (2022–2025)
- Former frequencies: 105.5 MHz (1995–2000)
- Call sign meaning: "Vegas"

Technical information
- Licensing authority: FCC
- Facility ID: 57281
- Class: C
- ERP: 99,000 watts
- HAAT: 603 meters (1,978 ft)

Links
- Public license information: Public file; LMS
- Webcast: Listen live
- Website: coyotecountrylv.com

KCYE (102.7 FM) - branded as 102.7 Coyote Country - is a commercial radio station licensed to Boulder City, Nevada, serving the Las Vegas Valley region. KVGS broadcasts a country music format. The station's studios are located in Spring Valley in unincorporated Clark County, while its transmitter is on Black Mountain in Henderson.

KCYE broadcasts in HD Radio.

== History ==
=== Early years (1995–2007) ===
The station was originally located at the 105.5 frequency and featured a hot adult contemporary format under the temporary call letters KQOL before becoming KSTJ. In 2000, a frequency swap took place in which the new 105.7 FM frequency moved to the Las Vegas market, and KSTJ moved to the 102.7 frequency as a result. It had also debuted an 1980s hits format as "Star 102.7". The format had moderate success, but in 2005, KSTJ began experiencing a ratings decline when KMZQ-FM debuted the "Jack FM" concept, with similar music being played, as well as having a bigger playlist, and the overall shrinking of the 1980s hits formats in general.

=== Adult contemporary (2007–2009) ===
On September 14, 2007, at 3 p.m., the station flipped to adult contemporary and rebranded as "Fresh 102.7". The last song on "Star" was "Cum On Feel the Noize" by Quiet Riot, while the first song on "Fresh" was "Straight From The Heart" by Bryan Adams. The station's callsign was changed to KFRH to reflect the new format on October 5, 2007.

=== Top 40 (2009) ===
On April 1, 2009, at 2 pm, KFRH dropped the adult contemporary format and began stunting with a loop of voices asking "When?" followed by the occasional "Soon", along with several songs with the word "when" in the title. At 4:33 p.m. that day, the station flipped to a Top 40 format branded as 102.7 Now. The first song played on "Now" was "Right Now (Na Na Na)" by Akon.

=== Country (2009–2022) ===
On August 25, 2009, KCYE and KFRH swapped frequencies, with KCYE, a country music station branded as "Coyote Country", moving to the higher-powered 102.7 frequency, and KFRH's Top 40 format moving to the lesser-powered 104.3 frequency. The swap was related to Beasley's sale of the 104.3 license, along with KBET, to Silver State Communications. On April 13, 2015, Disney announced that the Radio Disney network would become distributed through affiliations with HD Radio subchannels. KCYE was the first HD Radio affiliate of the network, and launched the format on their HD2 sub-channel.

After re-branding on November 30, 2015, as "102.7 Rodeo Radio" during the National Finals Rodeo, on December 13, 2015, KCYE began stunting with Christmas music, branded as "102.7 Santa FM". However, the station returned to its country music format as "102.7 The Coyote"; following this, however, the format would gradually be slightly rebranded as "Coyote Country".

On June 1, 2017, it was announced that KCYE and sister AM station KDWN (720) would be the Las Vegas radio affiliates for Oakland Raiders football broadcasts, for preseason and the regular season. This was in light of the pending relocation by 2020 of the franchise from Oakland to Las Vegas. In 2019, games moved to KYMT.

=== Hot adult contemporary (2022–2025) ===
On June 17, 2022, it was announced that KCYE and KVGS would swap formats and call signs at 10 a.m. on June 24, with "Coyote Country" moving to 107.9 and KVGS' hot adult contemporary format becoming "102.7 VGS". (On 107.9, KVGS had reused KSTJ's former "Star" name.)

During the Vegas Golden Knights' Stanley Cup run in 2023, KVGS temporarily rebranded as "102.7 VGK" as a nod to the team. At approximately 7:56 p.m., when Game 5 of the 2023 Stanley Cup Final ended, KVGS temporarily suspended its hot AC format and went freeform for several hours as a celebration of the Golden Knights' Stanley Cup victory. KVGS' afternoon hosts came on during that time to take listeners' requests of songs, even if it was not part of their usual format.

=== Return to country (2025) ===
On November 4, 2025, Beasley announced that KCYE and KVGS would revert to their pre-2022 frequencies on November 13 at Midnight, with 102.7 set to re-inherit their old country music format and "Coyote Country" branding at that time.

== HD programming ==
KVGS has three HD subchannels. The HD1 subchannel is the digitized standard signal of the main programming, From the activation of its HD2 subchannel until 2017, the HD2 subchannel served as the affiliate for Radio Disney, On June 1, 2017, KCYE's HD2 subchannel format was flipped to adult contemporary, branded as "Lite 101.5" (fed onto translator K268CS 101.5 FM Las Vegas). On June 10, 2017, Radio Disney programming moved to a newly activated HD3 sub-channel, only for it to be replaced by NOAA Weather Radio in June 2018. On June 21, 2018, KCYE's HD2 subchannel adopted a simulcast of talk-formatted KDWN 720 AM Las Vegas.
