= KCEP =

KCEP may refer to:

- KCEP (FM), a radio station (88.1 FM) licensed to Las Vegas, Nevada, United States
- Kansas City Equity Partners, an investment company
- Kaplan, Inc. Certified Education Provider
