= KOAS =

Radio station in Dolan Springs, Arizona, serving Las Vegas

- Dolan Springs, Arizona; United States
- Broadcast area: Laughlin, Nevada; Bullhead City, Arizona; Las Vegas Valley
- Frequency: 105.7 MHz (HD Radio)
- Branding: 105.7 Maxima

Programming
- Format: Bilingual adult contemporary
- Affiliations: Compass Media Networks; Vegas Golden Knights (Spanish language broadcasts)

Ownership
- Owner: Beasley Broadcast Group, Inc.; (Beasley Media Group Licenses, LLC)
- Sister stations: KCYE, KKLZ, KVGS, KXTE

History
- First air date: August 1, 1984 (as KCRR)
- Former call signs: KCRR (1984–1987); KFLG (1987–2000); KBYE (2000–2001)
- Call sign meaning: "Oasis" (former branding)

Technical information
- Licensing authority: FCC
- Facility ID: 25692
- Class: C
- ERP: 100,000 watts (horizontal, no vertical ERP); 2,500 watts (booster)
- HAAT: 542.8 meters (1,781 ft)
- Transmitter coordinates: 35°50′11.00″N 114°19′8.00″W
- Repeaters: 105.7 KOAS-FM1 (Henderson, Nevada)

Links
- Public license information: Public file; LMS
- Webcast: Listen live
- Website: 1057maxima.com

KOAS (105.7 FM, 105.7 Maxima) is a radio station broadcasting a bilingual adult contemporary format. Licensed to Dolan Springs, Arizona, United States, the station serves the Laughlin/Las Vegas/Dolan Springs area. The station is currently owned by Beasley Broadcast Group, Inc. through licensee Beasley Media Group, LLC. The station's studios are located in the unincorporated Clark County area of Spring Valley while its transmitter is in Dolan Springs.

== Translators ==
- KOAS operates an FM booster transmitter on 105.7 MHz in Henderson, Nevada. The booster, known as KOAS-FM1, transmits with 2,500 watts of ERP. It provides the Las Vegas area with a stronger signal than the main transmitter located in Dolan Springs.
- K288FS, a translator of KOAS, serves nearby Pahrump, Nevada with a two hundred fifty-watt signal on 105.5 MHz. K288FS is currently silent and has never been on the air.

== History ==
The station's license began on August 1, 1984, under the call sign KCRR, which later changed to KFLG in November 1987, and KBYE in December 2000. Following these initial shifts, the station settled into the Smooth Jazz format, branding itself as "The Oasis" and adopting the KOAS call letters on August 14, 2001. This format lasted until December 26, 2009, when the station shifted to Rhythmic Adult Contemporary, eventually evolving into Rhythmic Oldies branded as "Old School 105.7" in 2013, a move that was credited with improving ratings. In June 2019, KOAS relaunched as Urban Adult Contemporary "Jammin' 105.7," focusing on R&B and classic hip-hop and adding The Steve Harvey Morning Show to its lineup. The station's most recent change occurred on April 1, 2025, when it flipped to a Bilingual Adult Contemporary format, now branded as "105.7 Maxima," using the tagline "Para Nosotros" ("It's for Us") and featuring a blend of English and Spanish-language pop hits. Following a broadcast deal made by Beasley, the station officially became the flagship station for Spanish language Vegas Golden Knights radio broadcasts ahead of their 2026 season.

== Gallery ==
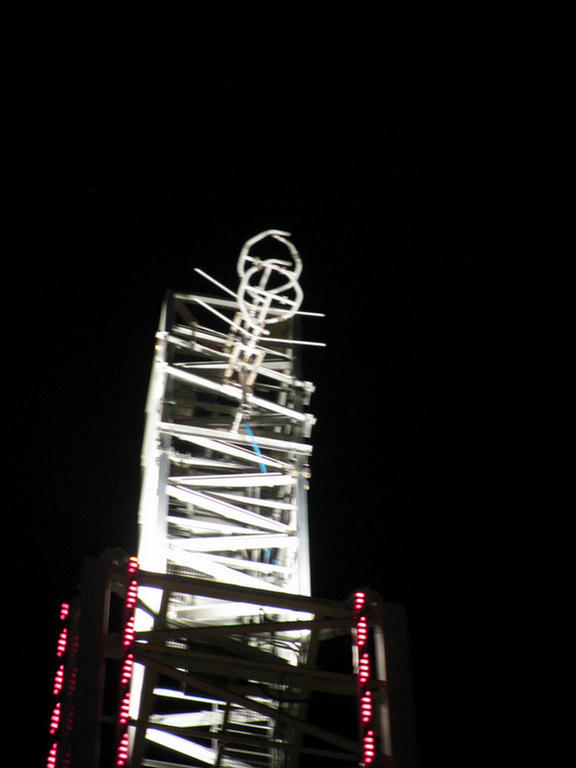
Picture of KOAS-FM1 and KVGS-FM1 transmitting antenna atop The Stratosphere, March 2010.

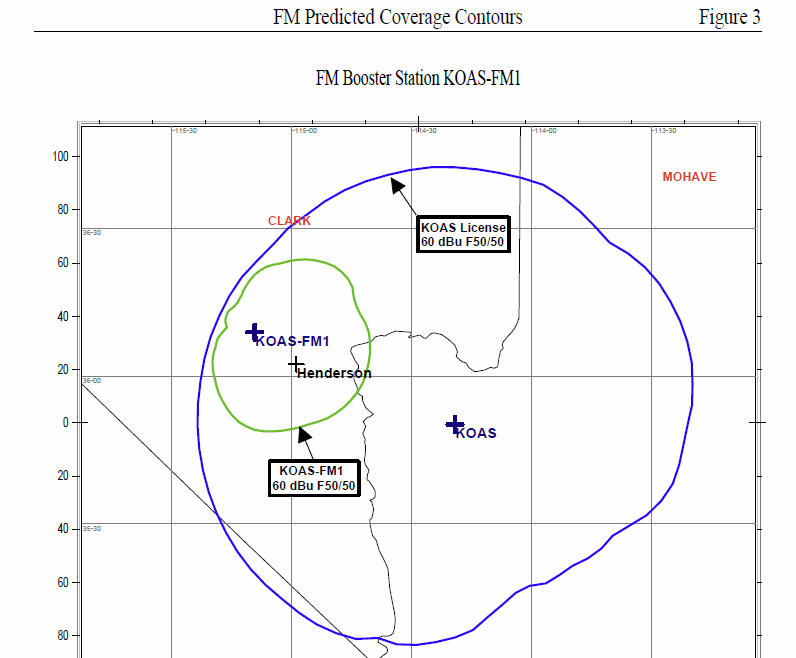
KOAS-FM1 coverage in comparison of the main KOAS(FM) transmitter.
