= Heidi Harris =

American talk radio host and author

- Born: Las Vegas, Nevada, U.S.
- Presenting career
- Show: The Heidi Harris Show
- Stations: KDWN (1988–1999 and 2006–2012); KXNT (1999–2006 and 2015–2017); KRLA and KTIE (2012–2013); KBET (2013–2015); KMZQ (2018–2021); KFTK-FM (2021–present)
- Network: Audacy
- Time slot: Sunday: 7:00 p.m. – 9:00 p.m. Central Time
- Website: heidiharris.com

Heidi Harris is an American talk radio host and author. Her show was a two-time winner of the Electronic Media Award (EMA) for Best Local Radio Talk Show. Harris was AM 840 KXNT Las Vegas station's morning host from 2015 to 2017, heard weekdays from 6:00 a.m. to 9:00 a.m., where she also spent 1999 to 2005 as one of Las Vegas’s predominant conservative broadcasters. She also hosts and produces the podcast Vegas Characters, which features Las Vegas personalities.

== Career ==
The Heidi Harris Show aired weekday mornings from 6:00 a.m. to 9:00 a.m. on CBS-owned AM 840 KXNT in Las Vegas. A native of Las Vegas and former professional singer and HR recruiter, she began her radio career at KDWN in Las Vegas in 1998. She moved across town to KXNT in 1999, initially as a fill-in host, weekend host and then co-host of a morning drive show from 2001 to 2006. She hosted her own show at KDWN from 2007 to 2012, before leaving for a radio job in Los Angeles.

The Heidi Harris Show, a conservative radio talk show, was heard weekday mornings on KRLA in Los Angeles and KTIE in San Bernardino, California from March 2012 to March 2013.

After returning from LA, she hosted an evening show on KBET in Las Vegas for two years before returning to KXNT to host morning drive. On September 19, 2017, her show was cancelled by KXNT days after she wrote a controversial Facebook post criticizing same-sex adoption, saying that only "married people of the opposite sex" should be allowed to adopt children.

Harris has appeared as a commentator on cable news channels, including MSNBC, CNN, TruTV and Fox News.

== Writing ==
Her first book, Cocktail Waitress Wisdom, was released in August 2010.

Her second book, Don't Pat Me On the Head, was released in June 2017.

== Awards ==
- In 2003, she won an Electronic Media Award for "Best Local Radio Talk Show."
- In 2011, she was named by Talkers Magazine as one of "America's 100 Most Influential Hosts."
- In 2012, she was named "America's 100 Most Important Radio Hosts" by Talkers Magazine's Michael Harrison, who included Harris in his pick of "5 Up and Coming Radio Personalities."
