= KVGK =

Adult hits radio station in Las Vegas

- Las Vegas, Nevada; United States
- Broadcast area: Las Vegas Valley
- Frequency: 93.1 MHz (HD Radio)
- Branding: Neon 93.1

Programming
- Language: English
- Format: Adult hits
- Subchannels: HD2: Urban contemporary "Real 103.9"; HD3: K-Love

Ownership
- Owner: iHeartMedia; (iHM Licenses, LLC)
- Sister stations: KSNE-FM; KWNR; K280DD

History
- First air date: March 6, 1980
- Former call signs: KUDO (1980–1987); KEYV (1987–1996); KBGO (1996–1998); KQOL-FM (1998–2006); KPLV (2006–2016); KYMT (2016–2026)
- Former frequencies: 93.3 MHz (1980-1982)
- Call sign meaning: Vegas Golden Knights

Technical information
- Licensing authority: FCC
- Facility ID: 6893
- Class: C
- ERP: 23,500 watts
- HAAT: 1,183 meters (3,881 ft)
- Transmitter coordinates: 35°57′54.9″N 115°30′3.1″W
- Translator: HD2: 103.9 K280DD (Las Vegas)

Links
- Public license information: Public file; LMS
- Webcast: Listen live (via iHeartRadio); HD2: Listen live (via iHeartRadio); HD3: Listen live
- Website: neon931.iheart.com; HD2: real1039.iheart.com; HD3: www.klove.com

KVGK (93.1 MHz, Neon 93.1) is a commercial radio station licensed to Las Vegas, Nevada, United States. It airs an adult hits format and is owned by iHeartMedia. KVGK's studios and offices are on Meade Avenue in Las Vegas, a mile west of the Strip, while its transmitter is on Potosi Mountain southwest of the Las Vegas Valley. The station's 23,500-watt signal can be heard over much of Southern Nevada and into California. KVGK broadcasts using HD Radio technology. On its HD2 channel, it airs a rhythmic contemporary format, known as "Real 103.9", which is also heard on a 250-watt FM translator station K280DD at 103.9 MHz. The HD3 channel carries K-Love programming.

== History ==
=== AC and smooth jazz ===
The station signed on the air on March 6, 1980, as KUDO. It was owned by the Quality Broadcasting Company, airing an adult contemporary format from studios in the Barbary Coast Hotel.

From 1984 to 1986, it shifted to hot adult contemporary music and was known as Music 93. After being sold to Unicom Broadcasting in 1986, the station rebranded as Key 93, changing call signs to KEYV in 1987.

=== AAA, country and oldies ===
In early 1992, KEYV flipped from its new age contemporary format to adult album alternative, citing low ratings diary performance, and retained the Key name. The format was ditched after Unicom entered into a local marketing agreement with Broadcast Associates Inc., the owner of KFMS-FM 101.9, later that year. KFMS, a country music station, installed a new country format on KEYV, which became known as "Hit Kickin' Country Y93". A $2.25 million sale was agreed, to be filed when FCC rules permitted ownership of two FM stations in Las Vegas.

In 1996, under Regent Communications ownership, KEYV flipped to oldies as KBGO. Two years later, the station became KQOL-FM in an agreement with the previous user of the call sign after it decided there was not enough listenership for competing oldies stations.

=== Party, My, and Party ===
On August 30, 2006, KQOL-FM flipped to a dance-friendly rhythmic adult contemporary format as KPLV ("93.1 The Party"), featuring dance music from the 1970s to the 1990s. The "Kool Oldies" format continued on KPLV's HD2 subchannel until 2008, when it was replaced with Pride Radio. On August 29, 2015, KPLV-HD2 began stunting with Christmas music, which led into the September 4 debut of urban contemporary "Real 103.9", simulcast on translator K280DD 103.9 FM.

By 2010, KPLV moved to a more Top 40 format. In September 2010, KPLV was placed on Mediabase's Rhythmic panel. In April 2011, KPLV was moved to Mediabase's contemporary hit radio panel. It rebranded as 93.1 All the Hits in 2010 and My 93.1 in 2012 before relaunching as The Party on April 17, 2015, again with a rhythmic lean to its music format.

=== The Mountain ===
On September 26, 2016, at noon, KPLV flipped to adult hits as "93.1 The Mountain". The format change brought the variety hits format to the market for the third time, as it was previously aired on KKJJ from June 2005 through August 2010 and KVGS from October 2011 through January 2015. On October 18, 2016, KPLV changed its call letters to KYMT to match the "Mountain" moniker. In April 2018, KYMT shifted to a mainstream rock format while retaining the "Mountain" moniker.

In 2019, KYMT began airing Las Vegas Raiders games in the team's last year in Oakland, California. In 2020, when the team itself moved to Las Vegas, the games moved to KOMP and KRLV.

=== Neon 93.1 ===
In February 2026, rumors of a format change were swirling amid declining ratings, with iHeartMedia registering new domains for the station; several of them hinted at a possible return of the rhythmic CHR "The Party" brand, or that it would do so as "Hits 93.1". On February 9, at noon, after playing "The Memory Remains" by Metallica, KYMT instead flipped back to adult hits as "Neon 93.1", with the name and logo inspired by the heavy use of neon lights in the architectural designs of Las Vegas, most famously in the Welcome to Fabulous Las Vegas sign. Five months after the change, iHeart changed the station's call sign to KVGK.
