= KWNR =

Radio station in Henderson, Nevada

- Henderson, Nevada; United States
- Broadcast area: Las Vegas Valley
- Frequency: 95.5 MHz (HD Radio)
- Branding: 95.5 The Bull

Programming
- Format: Country
- Subchannels: HD2: Classic country; HD3: Regional Mexican (KYLI)
- Affiliations: Premiere Networks; Athletics Baseball Radio Network

Ownership
- Owner: iHeartMedia, Inc.; (iHM Licenses, LLC)
- Sister stations: KYMT, KSNE-FM, K280DD

History
- First air date: July 18, 1972
- Former call signs: KILA (1972–1985); KYYX (1985–1987); KLSQ (1987–1989)
- Call sign meaning: "Winner" (former branding)

Technical information
- Licensing authority: FCC
- Facility ID: 61527
- Class: C
- ERP: 100,000 watts
- HAAT: 354 meters (1,161 ft)
- Translators: 92.7 K224AR (Beatty); HD3: 96.7 K244EX (Las Vegas)

Links
- Public license information: Public file; LMS
- Webcast: Listen live (via iHeartRadio)
- Website: 955thebull.iheart.com

KWNR (95.5 FM "95.5 The Bull") is a commercial radio station licensed to Henderson, Nevada, United States, and broadcasting to the Las Vegas Valley. It airs a country music format and is owned by iHeartMedia, Inc. The studios are on Fremont Street in Las Vegas, a mile west of the Strip.

The transmitter is located on Black Mountain in Henderson. KWNR broadcasts using HD Radio technology: the HD-2 digital subchannel plays classic country music. The HD-3 subchannel carries regional Mexican as "La Campensina 96.7" which feeds FM translator K244EX at 96.7 MHz.

== History ==
The station first signed on the air on July 18, 1972. It was a non-commercial, non-profit Christian radio station known as KILA. When KILA moved to another frequency in 1985, the short-lived KYYX began. It was a country station designed to compete with country music leader KFMS (101.9 FM). KYYX floundered after two years: in 1987, 95.5 switched to hot adult contemporary as KLSQ (Q95).

In 1989, the station switched its call sign to KWNR and was known as "Winner 95.5". Winner lasted about a year before switching to "New Country 95.5" in September 1990. In 2004, "New Country" was dropped and the station was known as 95.5 KWNR. The "New Country" label came back in the summer of 2006. Streaming began November 17, 2005.

On September 20, 2013, KWNR rebranded as "95.5 The Bull".

KWNR's HD2 subchannel added coverage of Athletics baseball games in 2025, in anticipation of the team's move into the Las Vegas area in 2028.

== Translators ==
Call sign	Frequency	City of license	FID	ERP (W)	HAAT	Class	Transmitter coordinates	FCC info	Notes
K224AR	92.7 FM	Beatty, Nevada	4447	17	−95 m (−312 ft)	D	36°55′39.8″N 116°46′27.2″W	LMS	—
K244EX	96.7 FM	Las Vegas, Nevada	153545	250	0 m (0 ft)	D	36°8′50.8″N 115°9′20″W	LMS	Relays HD3
