= KVGQ =

- Overton, Nevada; United States
- Broadcast area: Las Vegas metropolitan area
- Frequency: 106.9 MHz
- Branding: 106.9 The Right Talk

Programming
- Language: English
- Format: Conservative talk

Ownership
- Owner: Kemp Broadcasting & Digital Media; (Kemp Communications, Inc.)
- Sister stations: KVEG; KMZQ; KEMP

History
- First air date: November 13, 2009
- Former call signs: KONV (2006–2009)

Technical information
- Licensing authority: FCC
- Facility ID: 164204
- Class: C1
- ERP: 100,000 watts
- HAAT: 289 meters (948 ft)
- Transmitter coordinates: 36°57′59.2″N 114°33′21.2″W
- Repeater: 106.9 KVGQ-FM1 (Apex)

Links
- Public license information: Public file; LMS
- Webcast: Listen live
- Website: 1069KVGQ.com

KVGQ (106.9 FM, "106.9 The Right Talk") is a radio station licensed to Overton, Nevada, United States. Owned by Kemp Communications, it broadcasts a conservative talk format. Its studios are located on the south end of the Las Vegas Strip, while its transmitter site is near Moapa Valley.

This station's programming is also simulcast on KEMP (99.3 FM) in Payson, Arizona. That station claims to broadcast to the Phoenix radio market, although there is a translator station on 99.3 in Phoenix, blocking KEMP within city limits. KEMP is powered at 17,000 watts and covers a region northeast of Phoenix and southeast of Flagstaff, Arizona.

== History ==
As part of its original format before June 24, 2013, KVGQ broadcast a lot of seldom heard pop and rock songs, especially in the United States. The "106.9 The Q" classic rock format was replaced by hot adult contemporary as "Q106.9". By 2019, KVGQ had evolved to a contemporary hit radio format with no branding changes, even though the "Q" branding was also being used by unrelated competitor KXQQ-FM ("Q100.5") for a classic hip hop format that launched in 2015.

On October 2, 2020, KVGQ flipped to 1990s/2000s hits branded as "106.9 Da Bomb", competing against KXQQ-FM. On September 2, 2023, KVGQ shifted to classic hip hop, retaining the "Bomb" branding; the new format complemented the contemporary hip hop heard on sister station KVEG.

On September 1, 2026, KVGQ changed its format to conservative talk, coinciding with the closure of similarly-formatted KXNT. The station's entirely-syndicated lineup includes three hosts–Glenn Beck, Mark Levin, and Dana Loesch–previously carried by KXNT, along with sharing The Clay Travis and Buck Sexton Show with Kemp's existing and separately-programmed talk station, KMZQ.

== Booster station ==
KVGQ programming is also carried by a booster station to extend or improve the coverage area of the station.

Broadcast translator for KVGQ
| Call sign | Frequency | City of license | FID | ERP (W) | Class | FCC info |
|---|---|---|---|---|---|---|
| KVGQ-FM1 | 106.9 FM | Apex, Nevada | 181108 | 20,000 | D | LMS |
