= Las Vegas Grammar School (Washington and D Streets, Las Vegas, Nevada) =

- U.S. National Register of Historic Places
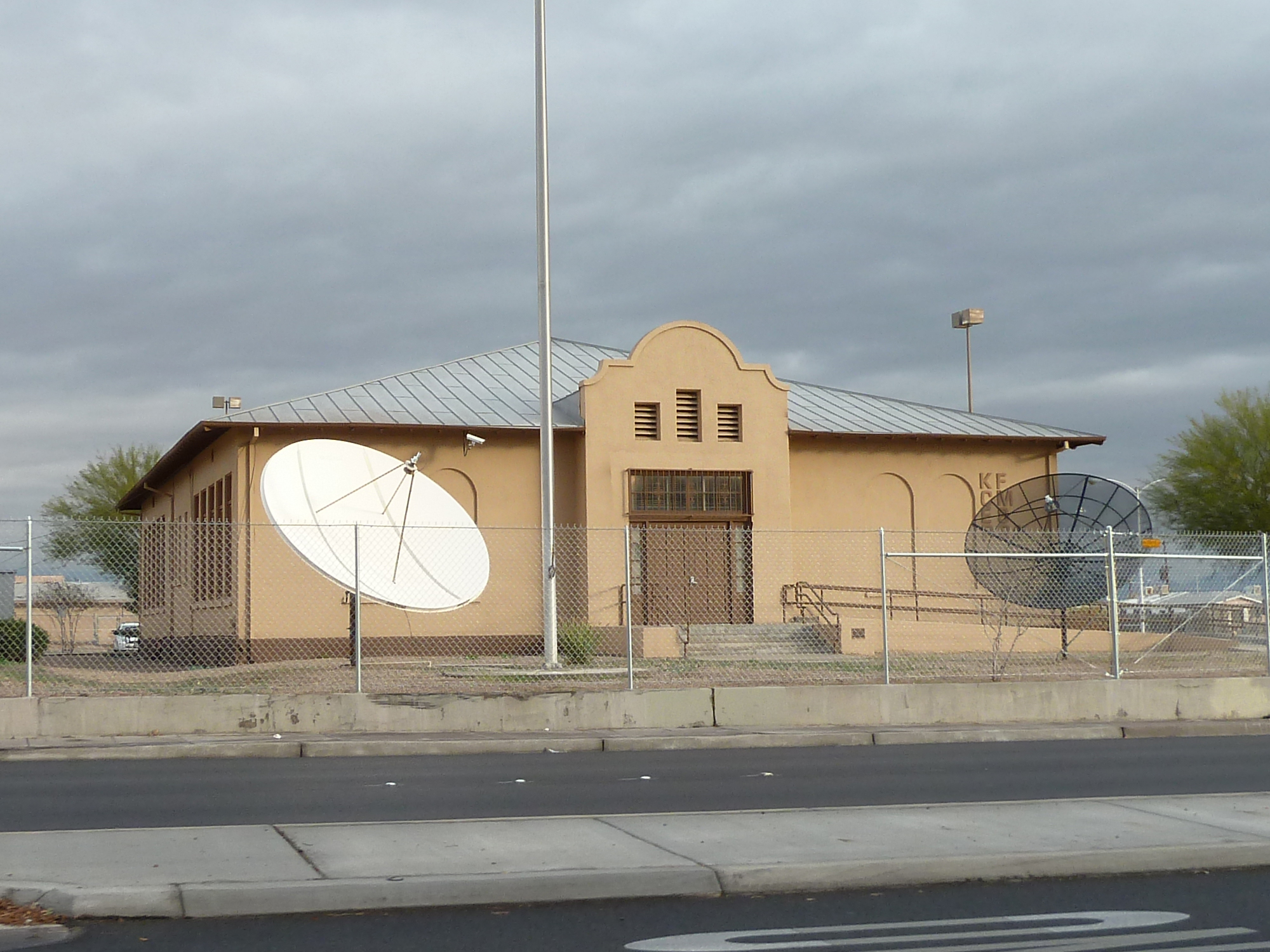
- Location: Washington and D Sts. Las Vegas, Nevada
- Coordinates: 36.18127°N 115.14633°W
- Architectural style: Mission; Spanish Revival
- NRHP reference No.: 79001460
- Added to NRHP: April 2, 1979

The Las Vegas Grammar School on Washington and D Streets in Las Vegas, Nevada, also known as the Westside School, Branch No. 1, Las Vegas Grammar School, and Las Vegas Grammar School Branch No. 1, is a Registered Historic Place in Nevada. It is Las Vegas’ oldest remaining schoolhouse and currently houses KCEP-FM, a community center and the Economic Opportunity Board.

== History ==
Helen J. Stewart donated land in 1922 for the school and it was built in 1923. It was the first public school attended by Native American students from the Paiute Indian Colony.

The building was added to the National Register of Historic Places on April 2, 1979.

== See also ==
- Las Vegas Grammar School (Las Vegas Boulevard, Las Vegas, Nevada), also historic and NRHP-listed

== Sources ==
- Las Vegas web site
- NRHP
