= KSNE-FM =

Adult contemporary radio station in Las Vegas

- Las Vegas, Nevada; United States
- Broadcast area: Las Vegas, Nevada
- Frequency: 106.5 MHz (HD Radio)
- Branding: Sunny 106.5

Programming
- Format: Adult contemporary
- Subchannels: HD2: Soft adult contemporary "The Breeze"; HD3: Christian radio (KNLB simulcast)
- Affiliations: Premiere Networks

Ownership
- Owner: iHeartMedia; (iHM Licenses, LLC)
- Sister stations: KYMT, KWNR, K280DD

History
- First air date: August 18, 1987; 39 years ago (as KRLV)
- Former call signs: KRLV (1987–1994)
- Call sign meaning: "Sunny"

Technical information
- Licensing authority: FCC
- Facility ID: 71525
- Class: C
- ERP: 100,000 watts
- HAAT: 352 meters (1,155 ft)
- Transmitter coordinates: 36°0′29.9″N 115°0′23″W
- Translator: HD3: 93.7 K229CT (Las Vegas)

Links
- Public license information: Public file; LMS
- Webcast: Listen live (via iHeartRadio)
- Website: sunny1065.iheart.com

KSNE-FM (106.5 MHz) is a radio station broadcasting an adult contemporary music format. Licensed to Las Vegas, Nevada, United States, the station serves the Las Vegas area. The station is owned by iHeartMedia. Its studios are in Las Vegas a mile west of the Strip and its transmitter is on Black Mountain in Henderson.

KSNE broadcasts three channels in the HD Radio format.

== History ==
KSNE first signed on the air in 1987 as KRLV. The call letters were changed from KRLV to KSNE-FM in 1994. KSNE/KRLV ran its own locally produced weeknight show known as Love Songs For Las Vegas hosted by local jock Robert Holiday in the same time slot. "Love Songs For Las Vegas" ran from 1991 to 1998, and was replaced by the syndicated Delilah show until 2010. The Delilah Show came back in late 2011. KRLV 106.5 was known as Continuous Soft Rock in 1987 until 1995. KRLV played Hot AC until the changeover to call letters KSNE. The KRLV callsign moved to 1340 AM.

The new KSNE-FM became known as "Continuous Soft Favorites" or "Continuous Soft Hits". KSNE began to play more soft AC focusing on such artists as Kenny G, Michael Bolton, Amy Grant, etc. This format continued until the mid-2000s when KSNE began to add more soft rock and current hits. In recent years, KSNE has become a more upbeat mainstream AC station, and today almost all of the songs heard on KSNE are from 1980 until the present. Sunny 106.5 plays Christmas music during the holiday season, as so happens to most iHeart-owned AC stations, like KOST, as well as other AC stations that are not owned by iHeartMedia.

Sunny 106.5 has previously jingles from JAM Creative Productions. From 2014 to 2016, Sunny 106.5 used the KVIL Reelworld jingles package. Since 2016, Sunny 106.5 uses the KOST 2016 jingles packages created for its sister station KOST in Los Angeles.

Sunny 106.5 is the local broadcast home of the iHeartRadio Music Festival which is held in the Las Vegas area.

== Translator ==
Call sign	Frequency	City of license	FID	ERP (W)	Class	Transmitter coordinates	FCC info	Notes
K229CT	93.7 FM	Las Vegas, Nevada	56170	250	D	35°56′44.9″N 115°2′38″W	LMS	Relays HD3
