= Helen Wiser Stewart =

Helen Jane Stewart
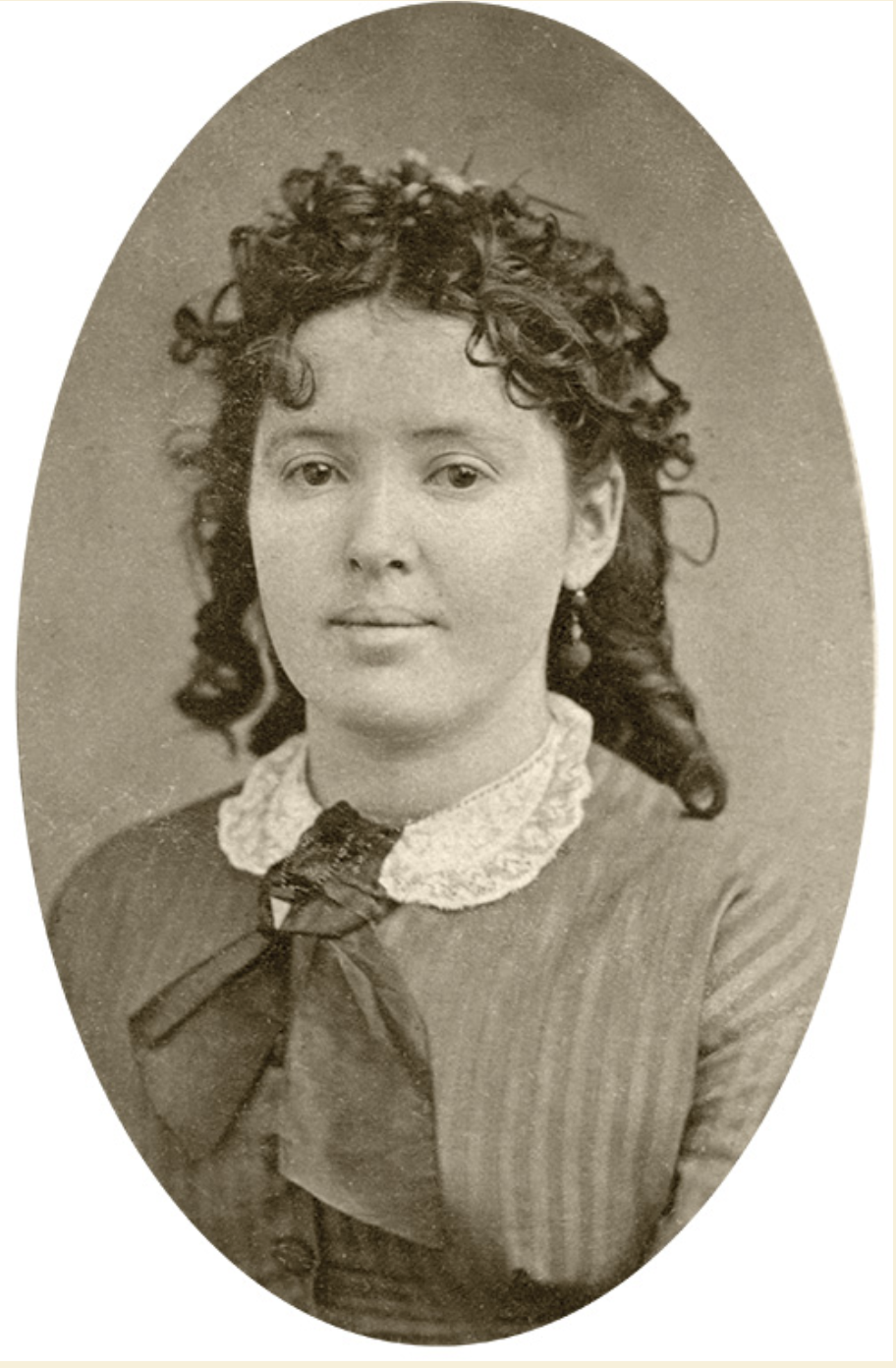
- Stewart ca. 1860s-1870s
- Born: Helen Jane Wiser; April 16, 1854; Springfield, Illinois
- Died: March 6, 1926 (aged 71); Las Vegas
- Occupations: Pioneer, postmaster

Helen Wiser Stewart (née Wiser; after marriage, Stewart; April 16, 1854 – March 6, 1926) was a Southern Nevada pioneer and was considered the "first lady of Las Vegas".

== Biography ==
Helen Jane Wiser was born near Peoria, Illinois, on April 16, 1854.

In 1863, at the age of nine, with her parents, Mr. and Mrs. Hiram Wiser, and the other members of the family, she crossed the plains and settled on a farm 2 miles (3.2 km) west of Galt, California.

On April 6, 1873, Wiser married Archibald Stewart and moved to Pony Springs near Pioche, Nevada. Their first three children, William James (1874), Hiram Richard (1876), and Flora Eliza Jane "Tiza" (1879), were born in the Pioche area.

In April 1882, Stewart and her family to the Las Vegas Valley to take possession of the Las Vegas Ranch (called the "Los Vegas Rancho" at the time so it would not be confused with Las Vegas, New Mexico) from Octavius Gass, who had defaulted on a loan from Archibald Stewart. The Stewarts' fourth child, Evaline La Vega, was born in the Las Vegas Valley in 1882. After her husband was shot and killed by a neighbor on July 13, 1884, Stewart, who was pregnant with her fifth child, Archibald Jr., tried unsuccessfully to sell the ranch.

With the help of her father, Stewart ran the ranch and began to purchase adjacent properties in anticipation of a railroad being built through the area. She eventually became the largest landowner in Lincoln County, Nevada.

In 1893, Stewart became the first postmaster of Las Vegas (though the name was spelled "Los Vegas" until 1903). Nine years later, Stewart sold 1,834 acres (742 ha) of the ranch, including the water rights, to the Los Angeles and Salt Lake Railroad for US$55,000. This land was established as the city of Las Vegas in 1905. In 1903, she married Frank Stewart (no relation to Archibald Stewart), who had been hired at the Las Vegas Ranch in 1886. Stewart moved into a new home in the growing community of Las Vegas and became an important part of social, political, and business circles.

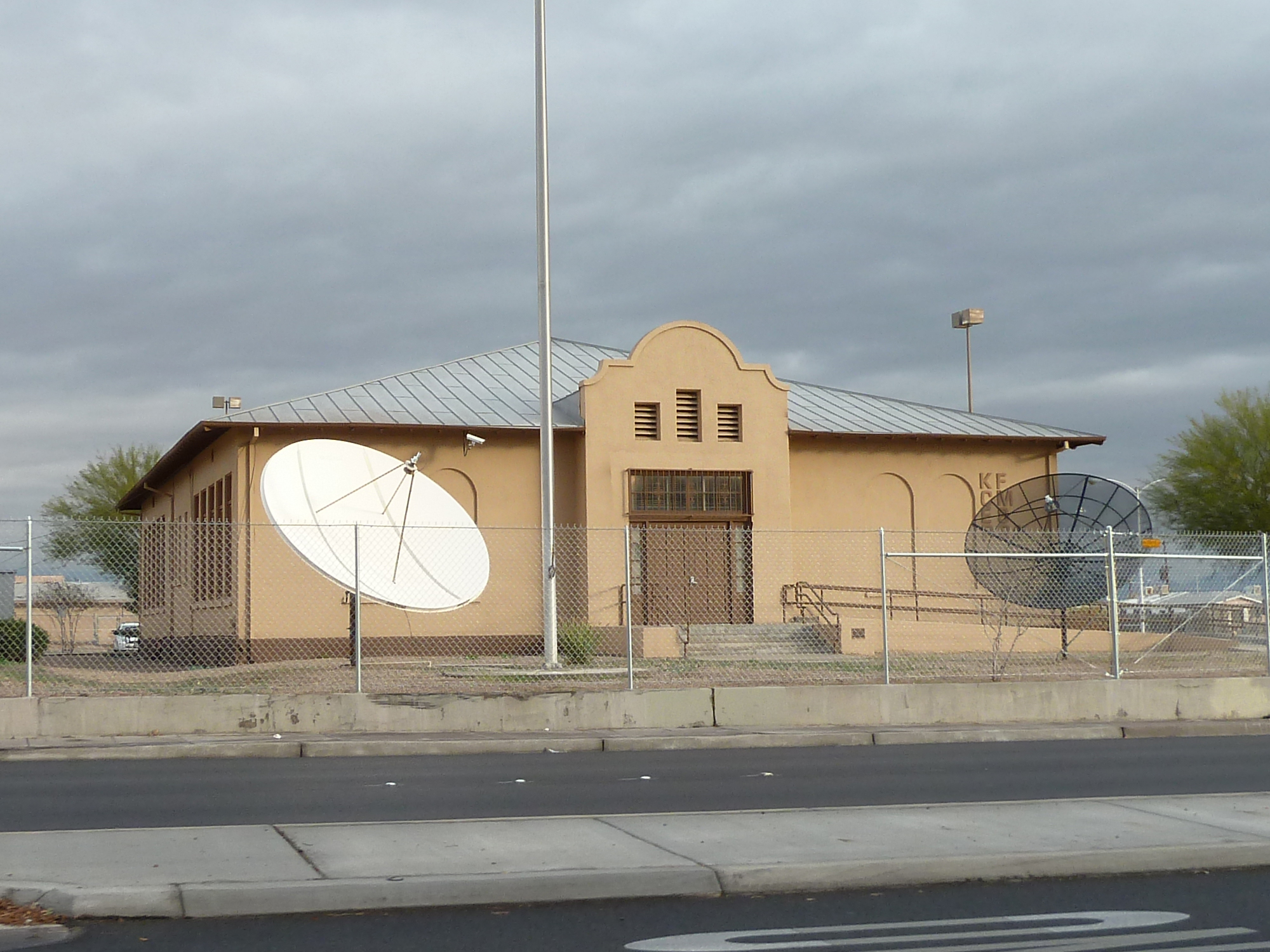
The first public school to accept native Americans

In 1916, Stewart became the first woman elected to the Clark County School District's Board of Trustees. Six years later, she donated land for the Las Vegas Grammar School, which was built in the following year. It was the first public school attended by Native American students from the Southern Paiute Indian Colony. The building was added to the National Register of Historic Places in 1979.

Stewart died in Las Vegas on March 6, 1926, at age 71.
