= KLVG-FM =

- Pahrump, Nevada; United States
- Broadcast area: Las Vegas metropolitan area
- Frequency: 107.5 MHz (HD Radio)

Programming
- Format: Contemporary Christian
- Network: K-Love

Ownership
- Owner: K-Love, Inc.

History
- First air date: July 1988
- Former call signs: KLVV (1986–88); KUDA (1988–93); KFBI (1993–96); KXTE (1996–2026)

Technical information
- Licensing authority: FCC
- Facility ID: 2100
- Class: C
- ERP: 24,500 watts
- HAAT: 1,137 meters (3,730 ft)
- Transmitter coordinates: 35.966°N 115.502°W

Links
- Public license information: Public file; LMS
- Website: klove.com

KLVG-FM (107.5 FM) is a non-commercial radio station licensed to Pahrump, Nevada, and serving the Las Vegas metropolitan area. The station is owned by K-Love, Inc. and broadcasts a contemporary Christian format from its transmitter atop Potosi Mountain in Blue Diamond.

This station began broadcasting in 1988 as adult contemporary KLVV, soon flipping to oldies under the KUDA call sign. After acquiring the rights to The Howard Stern Show, it flipped to classic rock in 1992 as KFBI. Upon its 1996 purchase by American Radio Systems, this station flipped to alternative rock, a format it maintained for most of the next three decades. In 2026, Beasley announced it would sell the KXTE facility to K-Love Inc. and subsequently moved its format and call sign to what is currently KVGS.

== History ==
=== Early years ===
In July 1988, this station began broadcasting as KLVV. Owned by Minority Media–Pahrump, it was the first station to broadcast from Potosi Mountain and broadcast a satellite-fed adult contemporary format. EZ Communications purchased the station the month it began broadcasting. Shortly after starting, in November, KLVV became KUDA and flipped to oldies. Americom, a company headed by Tom Quinn which also owned stations in the Reno and Fresno markets, acquired KUDA in 1989 for $4 million, doubling EZ's investment in a year.

Americom added The Howard Stern Show to KUDA's lineup in November 1992, making it the 10th station to air the shock jock. Stern brought listeners to mornings but was broadly incompatible with the softer oldies the station carried, leading the station in late December to flip to classic rock and change call signs to KFBI, with a fingerprint in its logo. KFBI competed with KKLZ, making Las Vegas one of few markets at that time with dueling classic rock stations, let alone two stations in the top 10 in the ratings. The Federal Communications Commission assessed a $73,750 fine to KFBI for carrying indecent comments made by Stern on his program.

=== Alternative rock era ===
Crescent Communications bought KFBI for $6 million in 1995. Within a year, it sold the station, along with KMZQ (100.5 FM) and KVEG (840 AM) to American Radio Systems (ARS) for $30 million. ARS realigned its four FM stations to target more specific demographics. Under new program director Mike Stern, the station flipped to alternative rock as KXTE "X107.5, Extreme Radio". The move was made because ARS found many of its listeners going to competing alternative outlet KEDG. It sold its properties to CBS Radio the next year.

Stern stayed on KXTE until the station pulled him in November 2005, a month before he left terrestrial radio for Sirius Satellite Radio, due to an early-expiring contract. He was replaced by Adam Carolla, which began airing on January 3, 2006, and ended on February 20, 2009. Dave Farra and Jason Mahoney, hosts of The Dave and Mahoney Morning Show, returned to the Las Vegas airwaves to take over mornings on April 20, 2009. On August 3, 2015, it was announced that Dave and Mahoney would re-locate from Las Vegas to CBS Radio sister station KHMX in Houston. On January 15, 2017, it was announced that the show would return to KXTE starting February 6. CBS Radio merged with Entercom in 2017.

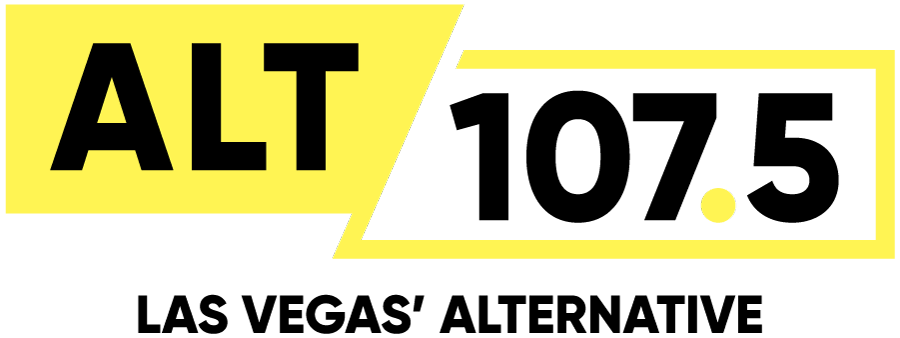
Logo as "Alt 107.5"

On September 14, 2020, KXTE rebranded as Alt 107.5 as part of a nationwide expansion of networked programming and the Alt brand across Entercom's alternative stations. As part of this, KXTE program director and afternoon host Ross Mahoney was let go, while Dave & Mahoney remained in mornings and would be syndicated to San Diego sister station KBZT. In addition, KXTE added Nicole Alvarez from KROQ-FM in Los Angeles for middays, Church of Lazlo from KRBZ in Kansas City for afternoons, and Kevan Kenney and Bryce Segall from WNYL in New York City for nights and overnights, respectively. Entercom renamed itself Audacy, Inc. in 2021.

=== Beasley ownership ===
Audacy and Beasley Broadcast Group engaged in a station swap in 2022 in which Beasley received KXTE in exchange for KDWN and translator K268CS. Beasley stated that the syndicated Dave & Mahoney show, based at KXTE, would remain on the station upon the closure of the deal. Beasley began operating the station through a local marketing agreement on November 14, at which time the station dismissed the entirety of the airstaff and began running jockless with limited imaging outside of Dave & Mahoney. On December 19, 2022, KXTE returned to its prior X107.5 branding and changed its weekday lineup to focus on hot talk programs. Dave & Mahoney remained the station's morning show and was joined by the syndicated Free Beer and Hot Wings Show in middays, and Dave & Chuck the Freak from sister station WRIF in Detroit (which aired live in early mornings and was replayed in afternoon drive). Alternative rock continued to be featured during overnights and weekends.

The hot talk format failed to make an impact in the market. In July 2023, Beasley hired Carlota Gonzales, a former host on KXTE and KOMP, and brought the station back to alternative with a classic lean, dropping Free Beer and Hot Wings as part of what it called a "music takeover".

=== Sale to K-Love, Inc. ===
On August 3, 2026, Beasley announced it would sell the license of KXTE to K-Love, Inc., with the station set to flip to their titular contemporary Christian music network (previously heard in the market on KLVG-LD). Beasley concurrently announced the "X" format would move to what was then KVGS upon sale closure. The station began simulcasting with KVGS at midnight on September 14, 2026, and picked up the format completely later that month. KXTE officially became an K-Love affiliate on October 1, 2026, and subsequently changed its call sign to KLVG-FM later that week.

=== KXTE HD programming ===
- KXTE-HD2 signed on its HD Radio programming in 2001 with X2, a deep tracks alternative format, then in 2010, flipped to an all-80s format branded as "Rewind". On January 22, 2014, KXTE-HD2 flipped to dance radio, branded as "SIN 107.5". “SIN” would later be replaced with a classic hits format, branded as “DLC Radio” and sponsored full-time by short-term loan provider Dollar Loan Center.
