= KYLI =

Radio station in Bunkerville, Nevada, serving Las Vegas and St. George, Utah

- Bunkerville, Nevada; United States
- Broadcast area: St. George, Utah; Las Vegas Valley
- Frequency: 96.7 MHz
- Branding: La Campesina 96.7 FM

Programming
- Format: Regional Mexican

Ownership
- Owner: Chavez Radio Group

History
- First air date: 2008
- Former call signs: KHIJ (2007–2011)
- Call sign meaning: Sounds like "Jelli" (former branding)

Technical information
- Licensing authority: FCC
- Facility ID: 164142
- Class: C
- ERP: 13,000 watts
- HAAT: 637 meters (2,090 ft)
- Transmitter coordinates: 37°9′18.9″N 113°52′59.9″W
- Translator: 96.7 K244EX (Las Vegas)
- Repeater: 100.5 KXQQ-HD3 (Henderson)

Links
- Public license information: Public file; LMS
- Webcast: Listen live
- Website: campesina.com

KYLI (96.7 FM, La Campesina 96.7 FM) is a radio station serving the Moapa Valley, St. George, Utah, and Las Vegas. The station is licensed to Bunkerville, Nevada. The Chavez Radio Group outlet operates with an ERP of 13 kW and broadcasts from a transmitter site near St. George.

The station, which previously had a country music format with the call letters KHIJ, flipped to a new interactive dance top 40 radio format known as Jelli, replacing former co-owned sister station KXLI's former format after it flipped to Jelli's interactive rock format, in June 2011.

On June 24, 2014, KYLI announced that it had ended its three-year partnership with Jelli. On June 25, the station adopted an electronic dance music format featuring the Pulse 87 brand as "Pulse 96.7", under the programming guidance of former KVBE consultant and Pulse 87 owner Joel Salkowitz. The launch marked the return of the "Pulse" brand to radio just five years after its demise at WNYZ-LP in New York City and its failed attempt to expand the brand to other cities. As of January 1, 2016, KYLI continued with the "Pulse" branding even after the Pulse 87 online broadcast shut down due to an increase in copyright royalty fees. The New York online stream came back in March 2016 after finding another platform.

On August 18, 2016, KYLI was sold to the Farmworker Educational Radio Network, Inc., who announced that the station would change to a Regional Mexican format. The dance format would move to online only, with listeners being directed to the Pulse 87 website. The sale, at a price of $850,000, was consummated on October 25, 2016; on October 26, KYLI flipped to Regional Mexican.

The station previously operated a co-channel booster, KYLI-FM1 in Sunrise Manor, Nevada, closer to Las Vegas. On October 11, 2019, the authorization for the booster was surrendered for cancellation. The Farmworker Educational Radio Network had, in 2017, acquired a translator on 96.7 in Las Vegas, K244EX, from Windy City Broadcasting; it receives its programming via the third HD Radio channel of KXQQ. To accommodate an upgrade to the translator, KYLI moved its main transmitter away from Las Vegas and closer to St. George, Utah.
