= KEMP =

Contemporary hit radio station in Payson, Arizona, United States

Simulcast of KVGQ, Las Vegas
- Payson, Arizona; United States
- Broadcast area: Phoenix metropolitan area
- Frequency: 99.3 MHz
- Branding: 106.9 The Bomb

Programming
- Format: Classic hip hop

Ownership
- Owner: Kemp Broadcasting & Digital Media; (Kemp Communications, Inc.)
- Sister stations: KMZQ; KVEG; KVGQ

History
- First air date: 2005
- Former call signs: KSXX (2005); KMZQ (2005–2008); KMZQ-FM (2008–2014)
- Call sign meaning: Owner Kemp Communications

Technical information
- Licensing authority: FCC
- Facility ID: 164203
- Class: C2
- ERP: 50,000 watts
- HAAT: 140 meters (460 ft)
- Transmitter coordinates: 34°11′4″N 111°20′16″W

Links
- Public license information: Public file; LMS
- Webcast: Listen live
- Website: www.thebomblv.com

KEMP (99.3 MHz) is a commercial FM radio station broadcasting a classic hip hop format. Licensed to Payson, Arizona, United States, the station is owned by Kemp Broadcasting & Digital Media. It broadcasts to the Phoenix metropolitan area, and it simulcasts with KVGQ in the Las Vegas metropolitan area.

The station has a construction permit to increase it signal strength to 50,000 watts effective radiated power (ERP) and increase its tower height above average terrain (HAAT) to 459 feet (140 meters).

== History ==
The station was assigned call sign KSXX on May 2, 2005. On August 31, 2005, the station changed its call sign to KMZQ, on July 30, 2008, to KMZQ-FM, and on August 19, 2014, to the current KEMP.

In 2014, KEMP began simulcasting sister station KVGQ in Overton, Nevada, part of the Las Vegas radio market.
