= KMXB =

Radio station in Henderson, Nevada

- Henderson, Nevada; United States
- Broadcast area: Las Vegas Valley
- Frequency: 94.1 MHz (HD Radio)
- Branding: Mix 94.1

Programming
- Language: English
- Format: Hot adult contemporary
- Subchannels: HD2: Channel Q; HD3: Talk radio "101.5 K-Dawn"

Ownership
- Owner: Audacy, Inc.; (Audacy License, LLC)
- Sister stations: KLUC-FM; KXQQ-FM

History
- First air date: February 10, 1971
- Former call signs: KXTZ (1971–95); KJMZ (1995–96)
- Call sign meaning: "Mix"

Technical information
- Licensing authority: FCC
- Facility ID: 51676
- Class: C
- ERP: 100,000 watts
- HAAT: 354 meters (1,161 ft)
- Transmitter coordinates: 36.008°N 115.006°W
- Translator: HD3: 101.5 K268CS (Las Vegas)

Links
- Public license information: Public file; LMS
- Webcast: Listen live (via Audacy); Listen live (HD3)
- Website: www.audacy.com/mix941fm; www.audacy.com/kdawn (HD3)

KMXB (94.1 FM, "Mix 94-1") is a commercial radio station licensed to Henderson, Nevada, and serving the Las Vegas radio market. KMXB airs a hot adult contemporary radio format and is owned by Audacy, Inc. The station's studios and offices are located in the unincorporated Clark County community of Spring Valley, while its transmitter is atop an unnamed peak commonly mistaken for Black Mountain, part of the same McCullough Range.

KMXB broadcasts in the HD Radio format. Its HD2 subchannel carries Channel Q, an Audacy format of LGBTQ talk and EDM dance music. The HD3 subchannel carries a talk format branded as "101.5 K-Dawn", which serves as the continuation of the programming of the former KDWN and the originating station for translator station K268CS (101.5).

== History ==
The station signed on the air on February 10, 1971. KXTZ was a beautiful music station from 1971 until 1994. The call sign spelled out the moniker "Ecstasy". KXTZ beat the market's easy listening music competitor KEER-FM 97.1, forcing that station to switch formats in 1984.

In 1994, KXTZ switched formats. It changed first to soft adult contemporary music and then to urban AC. In the mid-1990s, the call sign was switched from KXTZ to KJMZ. The station was known as "94.1 - Jamz". In April 1996, KJMZ became KMXB ("Mix 94.1"). The first song played on KMXB was Nirvana's "Come As You Are." In 1998, KMXB was acquired by Infinity Broadcasting, which later merged with CBS Radio.

In 1999, KMXB's morning drive time show, "Mark and Mercedes in the Morning", appeared on an episode of Everybody Loves Raymond, a popular TV sitcom. "Mark and Mercedes in the Morning," celebrated their 10-year anniversary in 2007. In December 2007, "Mark and Mercedes in the Morning" scored the first post-rehab interview with Lindsay Lohan in a contest where listeners had to get celebrities to call in for Hannah Montana tickets.

On February 2, 2017, CBS Radio announced it would merge with Entercom. The merger was approved on November 9, 2017, and was consummated on November 17.

== HD Radio ==
=== HD2 ===
KMXB-HD2 aired an 1980s/1990s hits format, branded as "Rewind 94.1", which was previously located on sister station KXTE-HD2.

On October 11, 2018, KMXB-HD2 switched to an LGBTQ talk/EDM format from Entercom, branded as "Out Now". On November 1, 2018, the station rebranded as Channel Q.

During the run of the 2024 National Association of Broadcasters (NAB) convention (typically shortened to "The NAB Show", and held annually at the Las Vegas Convention Center) in April of that year, KMXB-HD2 temporarily flipped to a micro-format branded as "Audacy Innovation Radio, Live from NAB", carrying an assortment of different formats with Audacy's in-house staffers running them; the intention was to show off new broadcasting innovations done to the equipment by both Audacy and broadcast system manufacturer Super Hi-Fi, and would effectively serve as a test run for new broadcasting equipment to be used on Audacy HD-broadcast stations nationwide, with the announcement made shortly after the convention on April 18; the station reverted to the Channel Q format at that time.

=== HD3 ===
KMXB-HD3 serves as the originating station for translator station K268CS (101.5 FM), which carries the conservative talk programming formerly heard on KDWN (720 AM) until March 2023. It continues to be branded "101.5 K-Dawn". Some programming from Audacy's other conservative talk station in the market, KXNT (840 AM), will be merged into "K-Dawn" concurrent with the September 2026 closure of KXNT.

Broadcast translator for KMXB-HD3
Call sign	Frequency	City of license	FID	ERP (W)	Class	Transmitter coordinates	FCC info
K268CS	101.5 FM	Las Vegas, Nevada	157046	250	D	36°8′54.8″N 115°9′18″W	LMS
