= KKLZ =

Classic hits radio station in Las Vegas

Coordinates: 36.008°N 115.006°W

- Las Vegas, Nevada; United States
- Broadcast area: Las Vegas Valley
- Frequency: 96.3 MHz (HD Radio)
- Branding: 96.3 KKLZ

Programming
- Format: Classic hits
- Subchannels: HD2: Classic hip hop "96.3 HD2 The Bounce"
- Affiliations: Premiere Networks; United Stations Radio Networks

Ownership
- Owner: Beasley Broadcast Group, Inc.; (Beasley Media Group Licenses, LLC)
- Sister stations: KCYE, KOAS, KVGS

History
- First air date: January 26, 1984 (as KITT)
- Former call signs: KITT (1983–1986)
- Call sign meaning: “Classic Rock”

Technical information
- Facility ID: 40757
- Class: C
- ERP: 100,000 watts
- HAAT: 358 meters (1,175 ft)

Links
- Webcast: Listen live
- Website: 963kklz.com

KKLZ (96.3 FM) is a commercial radio station located in Las Vegas, Nevada. The station is owned by Beasley Broadcast Group and airs a classic hits music format branded as "96-3 KKLZ". The KKLZ studios are located in Spring Valley, an unincorporated area of Clark County, while its transmitter is on Black Mountain in Henderson.

== History ==
=== Top 40 (1984-1986) ===
The station first signed on January 26, 1984, as KITT with a top 40 music format.

=== Classic rock (1986-2007) ===
On January 1, 1986, KITT flipped from CHR to an adult contemporary music format branded "Z96", with new call letters KKLZ to accompany the change. By mid-1986, the station was airing a classic rock format and began identifying on-air as "The All New 96.3 KKLZ".

Morning drive personalities from this era included original morning show hosts The O Brothers, followed by Butz and Tucker, then Johnson and Tofte in early 1990. Other disc jockeys included Danny Lea, Jeffrey "Professor Jeff" Anderson, Dennis Mitchell, The Warrior, Kimberly Kelly, with Backseat Beth, and Bruno and The Big Kahuna. KKLZ produced much of its programming locally, such as The Poorman's Concert, The Night Of The Living Dead, and Cruisin' for a Bluesin'. Also on KKLZ was one of the original Breakfast with the Beatles programs, which today is still hosted by Dennis as a nationally syndicated program originating from KTYD in Santa Barbara, California.

From 1993 to 2002, KKLZ presented an annual concert festival known as "June Fest". It was held the first Saturday of every June on soccer fields just outside Sam Boyd Stadium and featured a long roster of rock artists. Throughout the year, listeners presented suggestions for concert lineups and requests for information about the show as it approached. Attendance ranged between 20,000 and 40,000.

KKLZ reached its creative zenith, as a classic rock station, in the mid-to-late 1990s when its studios were located on Industrial Road in Las Vegas. The trailblazing and innovative morning show during this time, Johnson & Tofte, enjoyed unprecedented local popularity in Las Vegas until they were fired due to the dissatisfaction of station management with program content. Since the passage of the Telecommunications Act of 1996, KKLZ has changed ownership multiple times. Starting in 2003, however, the station's Arbitron ratings improved and KKLZ became the top rock music station in Las Vegas among males ages 25–54 during the Spring 2005 ratings period.

=== Classic hits (2007-present) ===
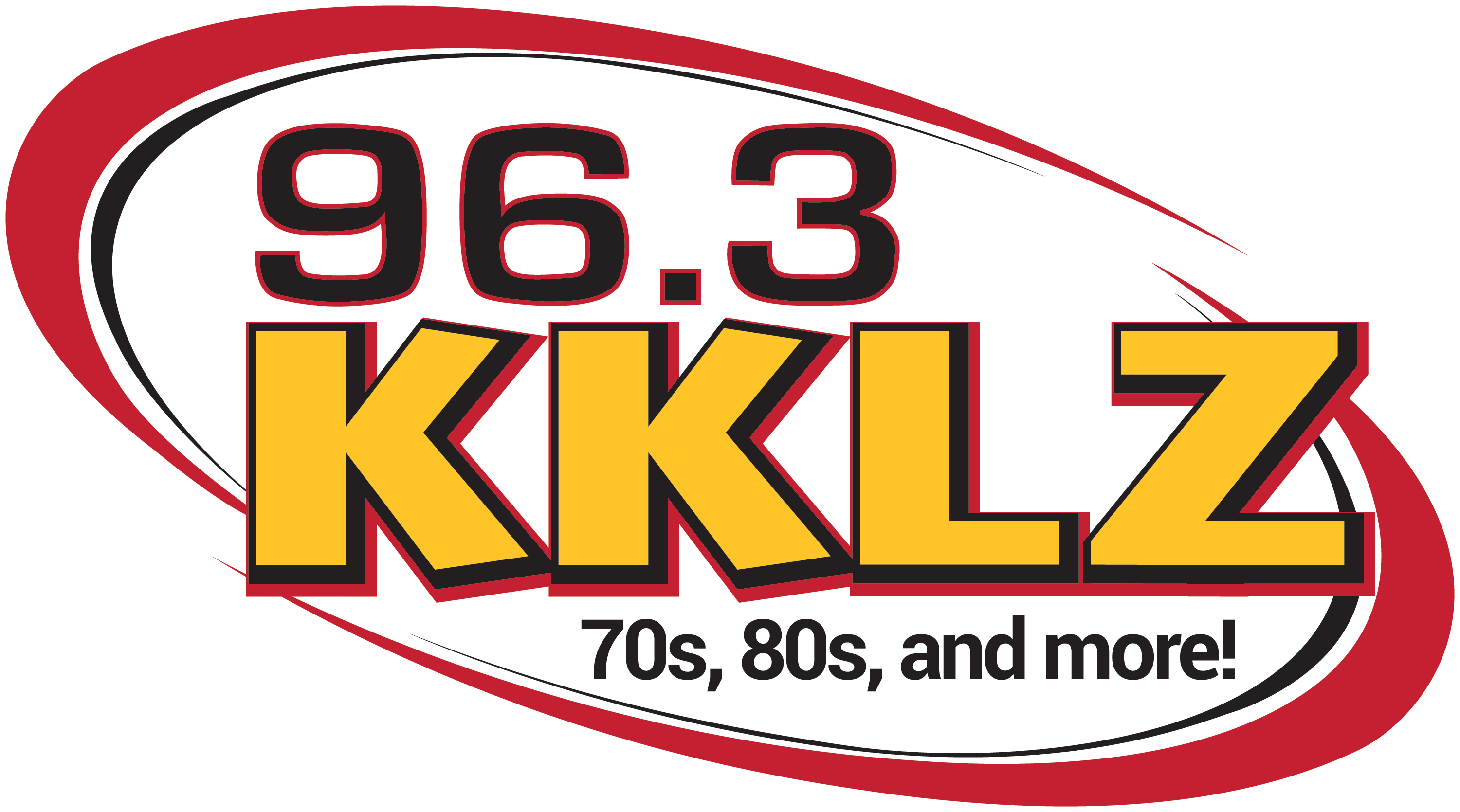
Logo under former slogan

Despite the station's success with the classic rock format, owner Beasley Broadcast Group decided to take the station in a different musical direction. On May 24, 2007, KKLZ changed its format to classic hits. In March 2010, KKLZ held the #1 position in the Las Vegas market among adults 25–54. In April, KKLZ became the #1 rated station overall among persons ages 6+ and persons 12+.

In May 2004, morning show producer and production director Christopher "Morty" Sampaio was laid off as part of nation-wide downsizing by Beasley. When news spread that Sampaio was battling stage 4 cancer, public outcry led to Beasley reinstating his employment. Sampaio remained employed by KKLZ until his death in November 2026.

In 2025, longtime morning host and program director Mike O'Brian retired. He was replaced by Shawn Tempesta, who joined incumbent co-host Carla Rea. Just four months later, Tempesta departed the station.

== Awards and nominations ==
Since 2010, KKLZ has earned three Marconi Radio Award nominations, but has not won any such awards.

| Year | Awards | Category | Recipient | Result | Source |
|---|---|---|---|---|---|
| 2010 | NAB Marconi Radio Awards | Oldies Station of the Year | | Nominated | |
| 2011 | NAB Marconi Radio Awards | Oldies Station of the Year | | Nominated | |
| 2012 | NAB Marconi Radio Awards | Oldies Station of the Year | | Nominated | |
