= KMZQ (AM) =

- Las Vegas, Nevada; United States
- Broadcast area: Las Vegas Valley
- Frequency: 670 kHz
- Branding: AM 670 KMZQ

Programming
- Format: Conservative talk
- Affiliations: Townhall News; Premiere Networks; Salem Radio Network; Westwood One

Ownership
- Owner: Kemp Broadcasting & Digital Media; (Kemp Communications, Inc.)
- Sister stations: KEMP; KVEG; KVGQ

History
- First air date: 2008
- Former call signs: KSXX (2003–2004); KBTB (2004–2008)

Technical information
- Licensing authority: FCC
- Facility ID: 122525
- Class: B
- Power: 25,000 watts (day); 600 watts (night)
- Transmitter coordinates: 36°23′5″N 115°21′5″W

Links
- Public license information: Public file; LMS
- Webcast: Listen live
- Website: 670kmzq.com

KMZQ (670 AM, "AM 670 KMZQ") is a commercial radio station licensed to Las Vegas, Nevada, United States. The station airs a conservative talk format and is owned and operated by Kemp Broadcasting & Digital Media. KMZQ's transmitter is sited off U.S. Route 95 at Alamo Road in Las Vegas.

== History ==
Before it went on the air, the station was assigned the call letters KSXX on October 10, 2003. On October 26, 2004, the station changed its call sign to KBTB; on July 29, 2008, it changed to KMZQ. It signed on as KMZQ in 2008. The KMZQ call letters and branding have historical ties within the Kemp organization, as the KMZQ-FM call sign was previously used on 100.5 FM in Las Vegas until 2005, and later on sister station KEMP in Payson, Arizona.

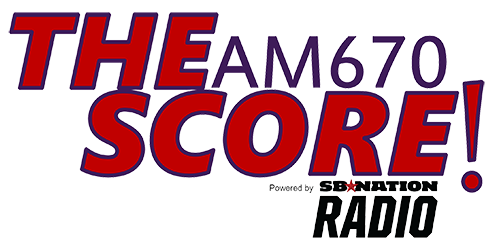
Logo as "670 The Score"

During the early 2010s, KMZQ was a sports radio station, "670 The Q", affiliated with Yahoo! Sports Radio. In July 2013, it took the Fox Sports Radio affiliation from KBAD and became "Fox Sports 670". KMZQ returned to Yahoo! Sports Radio as "670 The Score" on June 1, 2015; Fox Sports Radio had moved to KRLV earlier in the year. Concurrently, the station became the flagship station for the locally-originated "Sports X Radio", which already aired nationally on Yahoo! Sports Radio but was carried locally on KDWN.

On March 1, 2018, KMZQ changed from sports radio to conservative talk, branded as "The Right Talk".

== Programming ==
On weekdays, KMZQ has a local news and interview show in middays hosted by Kevin Wall. The rest of the schedule is nationally syndicated programs.
