= KXNT (AM) =

Currently silent
- North Las Vegas, Nevada; United States
- Broadcast area: Las Vegas Valley
- Frequency: 840 kHz
- Branding: News/Talk 840 KXNT

Programming
- Format: Talk radio
- Affiliations: ABC News Radio; Bloomberg Radio; Compass Media Networks; Premiere Networks; Radio America; Salem Radio Network; Westwood One; KLAS-TV

Ownership
- Owner: Audacy, Inc.; (Audacy License, LLC)
- Sister stations: KLUC-FM; KMXB; KXQQ-FM

History
- First air date: October 18, 1988
- Former call signs: KBKK (CP, 1985–1986); KVEG (1986–1996)
- Call sign meaning: "News Talk"

Technical information
- Licensing authority: FCC
- Facility ID: 33068
- Class: B
- Power: 50,000 watts (day); 25,000 watts (night)
- Transmitter coordinates: 36°23′52.89″N 114°55′0″W
- Repeater: 100.5 KXQQ-FM-HD2 (Henderson)

Links
- Public license information: Public file; LMS
- Webcast: Listen live (via Audacy)
- Website: www.audacy.com/kxnt

KXNT (840 AM) is a commercial radio station licensed to North Las Vegas, Nevada. Until going silent in 2026, it broadcast a talk radio format. The station is owned and operated by Audacy, Inc. KXNT's studios were in the unincorporated community of Spring Valley, while its transmitter was on U.S. Route 93 in North Las Vegas.

KXNT is a Class B clear-channel station. WHAS in Louisville is the dominant Class A station on 840 AM, so KXNT must reduce its power at night to avoid interfering with WHAS's signal. KXNT operated with 50,000 watts by day and 25,000 watts at night, using a directional antenna with a four-tower array.

KXNT is licensed to broadcast using HD radio technology, but by 2026 was not broadcasting in HD. It was heard on an HD subchannel of co-owned KXQQ-FM 100.5. KXNT was Southern Nevada's primary entry point station for the Emergency Alert System.

== History ==
Juarez Communications Corporation applied to build a new middle of the road music (MOR) radio station on 650 kHz in North Las Vegas, Nevada, in February 1981. Juarez was owned by Yolanda M. Juarez Naismith, a bank teller in Flint, Michigan, that formerly announced for that city's WFDF and WFBE; Lillian Wegerly; and Bernadette M. Wegerly. The station would broadcast daytime only with 1,000 watts. A construction permit–now specifying 10,000 watts of daytime power–was granted on April 4, 1985, and issued the call sign KBKK on April 11. By 1986, the permit had been moved to 840 kHz, with 50,000 watts by day and 25,000 watts at night, and was planned to sign on that April with country music. The call sign was changed to KVEG on March 27, 1986.

KVEG went on the air at 5 a.m. on October 18, 1988, with an adult contemporary format and an evening talk program. Over the years, KVEG had several noted hosts including Sam Greenfield, Dominick Brascia, Lou Epton, Irwin Schiff and the syndicated Tom Leykis.

Juarez Naismith and the Wegerlys' Roberts Communications sold KVEG–by this point a full-time news/talk station–to Bel Air Communications for $431,000 in 1990. Bel Air was owned by a consortium of investors from Los Angeles: Richard Griser, Mark Stone, Joav Gersten, Barbara Griser, and Alan Ericksen. On November 1, 1991, the station became a launch affiliate of a new Las Vegas-based sports talk network, the Sports Entertainment Network (SEN); KVEG was its flagship station, and by the end of the month all non-sports programming had been dropped from the station. In its early months, SEN's network feed was a full-time retransmission of KVEG, including advertisements for sports betting parlors and 1-900 numbers only intended to be heard locally; in July 1992, after months of complaints from its other affiliates, SEN installed equipment to allow the network to air separate national advertising during KVEG's local breaks.

On December 16, 1996, KVEG changed its call sign to KXNT with the "NT" standing for "News/Talk". The station moved to a more traditional talk radio line up; this included two programs, The Rush Limbaugh Show and Coast to Coast AM, previously heard on rival KDWN. Other talk shows included Dr. Laura and Bill Handel.

In 1998, Infinity Broadcasting acquired KXNT. In December 2005, Infinity was renamed CBS Radio. On February 2, 2017, CBS Radio announced it would merge with Entercom. The merger was approved on November 9, 2017, and was consummated on November 17. In 2021, Entercom changed its name to Audacy, Inc.

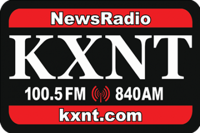
Logo during simulcast on 100.5 FM

Between August 16, 2010, and September 4, 2015, programming on KXNT was simulcast on sister FM station KXNT-FM 100.5, to give listeners who prefer FM that option. That station now airs a rhythmic hot adult contemporary format, under the call sign KXQQ-FM, however KXNT could still be heard on its HD2 subchannel.

Audacy closed KXNT on September 1, 2026, due to the loss of its tower site. Some of its programming, including Alan Stock's local morning program and Erick Erickson's syndicated show, would be consolidated onto the company's other conservative talk station, "K-Dawn", which operates on KMXB-HD3 and K268CS (101.5 FM) as the successor to KDWN. Three other syndicated programs–Glenn Beck, Mark Levin, and Dana Loesch–were acquired by KVGQ, which began a competing conservative talk format the same day. The move officially took place at midnight on the date in question, with program director Mark Bonilla interrupting a rebroadcast of Coast to Coast AM to give a final message redirecting listeners to K-Dawn or the Audacy application, before reciting a list of people associated with the station officially being honored one last time, playing Ray Charles' rendition of "America the Beautiful" at his admitted personal request from fellow host Alan Stock, then ending the broadcast with a Q-code transmitted message a picture of the transmitter sites transmitted using slow-scan television, honoring the station's history (a direct tribute to similar signoffs done at KXST and KDWN; Bonilla acknowledged this as a message to "the techies out there") and a final playing of the most recent KXNT legal station identification. Following this, the station officially fell to dead air until the transmission finally fell silent.

== Programming ==
On weekdays, KXNT aired two local talk shows. In morning drive time, an hour was hosted by Alan Stock. Sam Mirejowsky hosted What's Right in afternoons. The rest of the weekday schedule was nationally syndicated talk shows.

During NFL season, KXNT carried Los Angeles Chargers games.

== Former hosts ==
- Heidi Harris
- Kerri Kasem
