= KLUC-FM =

- Las Vegas, Nevada; United States
- Broadcast area: Las Vegas metropolitan area
- Frequency: 98.5 MHz (HD Radio)
- Branding: 98.5 KLUC

Programming
- Format: Contemporary hit radio
- Subchannels: HD2: Sports gambling "98.5 HD2 The Bet"; HD3: Regional Mexican K251BS "Fiesta 98.1"

Ownership
- Owner: Audacy, Inc.; (Audacy License, LLC)
- Sister stations: KMXB; KXNT; KXQQ-FM

History
- First air date: 1963
- Former call signs: KRBO-FM (CP, 1961–62)
- Call sign meaning: "Lucky"

Technical information
- Licensing authority: FCC
- Facility ID: 47744
- Class: C
- ERP: 100,000 watts
- HAAT: 360 meters (1,180 ft)
- Transmitter coordinates: 36.008°N 115.006°W
- Translator: HD3: 98.1 K251BS (North Las Vegas)

Links
- Public license information: Public file; LMS
- Webcast: Listen live (via Audacy); Listen live (via Audacy) (HD2); Listen live (HD3)
- Website: www.audacy.com/kluc; www.audacy.com/thebetlasvegas (HD2); fiestaradiolasvegas.com (HD3)

KLUC-FM (98.5 MHz) is a commercial radio station in Las Vegas, Nevada, airing a contemporary hit radio format. Owned by Audacy, Inc., the station's studios are on South Tenaya Way at West Warm Springs Road in Spring Valley, using a Las Vegas address.

KLUC-FM is a Class C station. It has an effective radiated power (ERP) of 100,000 watts, the maximum for most stations. Its transmitter is off Mountain Tower Road, atop Black Mountain in Henderson. KLUC-FM broadcasts using HD Radio technology. Its HD2 subchannel carries a sports betting format from the BetMGM Network. The HD3 subchannel airs a Regional Mexican music format known as "Fiesta 98.1", which feeds FM translator K251BS at 98.1 MHz.

== History ==
=== Early years ===
Rainbow, Inc., owner of KRBO (1050 AM}, obtained a construction permit for a new FM radio station in Las Vegas on March 22, 1961. The unbuilt station, originally dubbed KRBO-FM, was sold along with the AM station to Meyer (Mike) Gold the next year. The AM station switched its call sign to KLUC, standing for "Lucky", a popular word in the gambling city of Las Vegas.

The FM station signed on the air as KLUC-FM in 1963. In its early years, KLUC-FM largely simulcast its AM sister station, which was a daytimer. When KLUC AM had to go off the air at night, KLUC-FM continued broadcasting. KLUC-FM was powered at less than 6,000 watts, a fraction of its current output. The studios were first located on Industrial Road and later W Hacienda Ave and the stations were network affiliates of CBS Radio.

=== Top 40 ===
The two stations were acquired by the KLUC Broadcasting Company in 1970. The company was renamed Western Cities Broadcasting in 1979 to reflect its station holdings in Las Vegas; Tucson, Arizona; and Sacramento, California. As more people acquired FM receivers, KLUC-FM grew in popularity. Western Cities was able to make the station's Top 40 format a ratings and revenue leader, starting in the late 1970s.

Western Cities was acquired by Nationwide Communications in 1985. Nationwide Communications was a subsidiary of Nationwide Insurance.

=== Changes in ownership ===
In 1996, KLUC-FM and KXNO (the former KLUC AM) were sold by Nationwide for $11 million to American Radio Systems of Boston. At the time, Nationwide noted that owning stations in Las Vegas did not fit its corporate strategy of concentrating on owning broadcast properties in the nation's 25 largest media markets.

KLUC-FM continued to play a slightly broader mix than a typical Top 40 station. It was also the recognized primary commercial outlet for urban contemporary and rhythmic music in the city, playing more rap in evenings. In 1998, American Radio Systems merged with CBS Radio. Around the same time, KLUC-FM returned to a more mainstream Top 40 direction.

By 2000 KLUC was listed as a Rhythmic reporter. In the early 2000s KLUC competed with KISS FM Las Vegas. It remained a rhythmic station for the rest of the 2000s. By 2010 KLUC was moved to the pop reporting panel.

On February 2, 2017, CBS Radio announced it would merge with Entercom. The merger was approved on November 9, 2017, and was consummated on November 17. In 2021, Entercom changed its name to Audacy, Inc.

=== Personalities ===
Weekdays begin with Chet Buchannan and Mikalah Gordon. Buchanan has done mornings on KLUC-FM since 1999. Gordon had previously hosted mornings on Channel Q, Audacy's LGBTQ channel and is a former American Idol contestant. In afternoon drive time, Bru is heard.

The station carries two nationally syndicated programs on weekdays: The Julia Show with Julia Lepidi is aired in middays, while the Tino Cochino Show airs in evenings.

== K251BS ==
K251BS
- Henderson, Nevada; United States
- Broadcast area: Las Vegas, Nevada
- Frequency: 98.1 MHz
- Branding: Fiesta 98.1 FM

Programming
- Language: Spanish
- Format: Regional Mexican/Reggaeton
- Affiliations: KLUC-FM

Ownership
- Owner: Rafael Cerros, Jr. & Rogelio Reglado; (Latino Hustle Group LLC)

History
- First air date: 1987
- Former frequencies: 107.1 MHz, 106.9 MHz

Technical information
- Licensing authority: FCC
- Facility ID: 48502
- Class: D
- ERP: 180 watts
- HAAT: 559.5 meters (1,836 ft)
- Transmitter coordinates: 36.008°N 115.006°W
- Repeater: 98.5 KLUC-FM-HD3 (Las Vegas)

Links
- Public license information: Public file; LMS
- Webcast: Listen live
- Website: www.fiestaradiolasvegas.com

K251BS (98.1 FM) is a translator radio station licensed to Henderson, Nevada, and is owned through licensee Latino Hustle Group LLC. The station carries a genre hybridization and markets itself as "the only radio station that combines two of the more listened-to genres in Spanish—Regional Mexican and Reggaeton."

=== History as "Fiesta Las Vegas" ===
"Fiesta" originally debuted May 2020 as the low-power FM6 radio station 87.7 KGHD-LP, and launched as "Fiesta 87.7 FM" ("Fiesta Las Vegas"). It operated as such until the FCC low-power broadcasting shutdown of July 2021 pushed radio operators of "Franken-FM" analog stations such as "Fiesta" to change their broadcasting frequencies.

In anticipation of the merger, station co-owners Rafael Cerros and Rogelio "El Torito" Regalado purchased the 98.1 FM translator K251BS in April 2021, following which they adjusted their programming to the frequency and rebranded as "Fiesta 98.1 FM". Since its conversion the station's content has been relayed through the 98.5 MHz HD-3 sub-channel of Audacy-owned KLUC-FM.

In addition to terrestrial FM radio, Fiesta broadcasts through a number of online applications including their station website and mobile apps.
