= KVEG =

- Mesquite, Nevada; United States
- Broadcast area: Las Vegas Valley
- Frequency: 97.5 MHz
- Branding: Hot 97.5

Programming
- Format: Rhythmic contemporary

Ownership
- Owner: Kemp Broadcasting & Digital Media; (Kemp Broadcasting, Inc.)
- Sister stations: KMZQ; KVGQ

History
- First air date: 2001
- Call sign meaning: "K Vegas" (alternate branding)

Technical information
- Licensing authority: FCC
- Facility ID: 83278
- Class: C
- ERP: 100,000 watts
- HAAT: 600 meters (2,000 ft)
- Transmitter coordinates: 36°35′5.9″N 114°36′4.0″W

Links
- Public license information: Public file; LMS
- Webcast: Listen live
- Website: www.kvegas.com

KVEG (HOT 97.5) is a rhythmic contemporary radio station licensed to serve Mesquite, Nevada, owned by Kemp Broadcasting. KVEG operates at 97.5 MHz with an ERP of 100 kW, its studios are located at the south end of the Las Vegas Strip, and its transmitter is located near Moapa Valley.
