= KXQQ-FM =

Radio station in Henderson, Nevada

- Henderson, Nevada; United States
- Broadcast area: Las Vegas metropolitan area
- Frequency: 100.5 MHz (HD Radio)
- Branding: Q100.5

Programming
- Language: English
- Format: Rhythmic adult contemporary
- Subchannels: HD2: Talk radio "101.5 K-Dawn"; HD3: Regional Mexican "96.7 La Campesina"
- Affiliations: Compass Media Networks

Ownership
- Owner: Audacy, Inc.; (Audacy License, LLC)
- Sister stations: KLUC-FM; KMXB; KXNT

History
- First air date: October 26, 1981
- Former call signs: KMZQ-FM (1981–2005); KKJJ (2005–2010); KXNT-FM (2010–2015)

Technical information
- Licensing authority: FCC
- Facility ID: 12560
- Class: C
- ERP: 100,000 watts
- HAAT: 357 meters (1,171 ft)
- Transmitter coordinates: 36.0083°N 115.0064°W
- Translator: HD2: 101.5 K268CS (Las Vegas) HD3: 96.7 K244EX (Las Vegas)

Links
- Public license information: Public file; LMS
- Webcast: Listen live (via Audacy)
- Website: www.audacy.com/q100vegas

KXQQ-FM (100.5 FM) is a commercial radio station licensed to Henderson, Nevada, United States, and serving the Las Vegas Valley. Owned by Audacy, Inc., it features a rhythmic adult contemporary format as "Q100.5". Studios are located in Spring Valley and the transmitter is atop Black Mountain. In addition to a standard analog transmission, KXQQ broadcasts over three HD Radio subchannels and is available online via Audacy; the second subchannel airs a talk radio format known as K-Dawn. K-Dawn can be heard on FM translator K268CS 101.5 Las Vegas. The third subchannel simulcasts KYLI Bunkerville and is also repeated on K244EX 96.7 Las Vegas.

== History ==
=== Klassy, Lite and Jack-FM ===
The station signed on the air on October 26, 1981. The original call sign was KMZQ-FM and the station was owned by Pargo Broadcating. It aired an easy listening format. KMZQ went through many changes over its 12-year run. At times, KMZQ was known as "Q-100" and "Klassy 100", playing adult contemporary music. From 1995 to 2005, it was known as "Lite 100.5 FM" playing soft AC.

On June 24, 2005, at 2 pm, after playing "Leaving Las Vegas" by Sheryl Crow, KMZQ-FM began stunting with Christmas music. Then, 45 minutes later, the stunt shifted to movie theme songs with the sound of a Roulette wheel in between. At 3 pm, the stunt ended with the station's new voiceover artist Howard Cogan asking to "please cut the cheesy Roulette wheel sound effect." He declared that Vegas needed a new radio station, as well as revealing that he was the new "operator" of the station, winning it in a poker match from "some guy named Joel" (most likely a reference to then-CEO of Infinity Broadcasting Joel Hollander). Shortly thereafter, "Lite 100.5" became Jack FM, with a variety hits format. The call letters were quickly changed to KKJJ. The first song on "Jack FM" was The Flying Lizards' cover of "Money (That's What I Want)". KMZQ-FM's call letters were moved to a station on 99.3 FM in Payson, Arizona, co-owned with KMZQ (670 AM) in Las Vegas Valley.

=== Talk and rhythmic AC ===
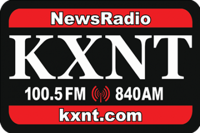
Logo as KXNT-FM

In July 2010, CBS Radio announced that starting on August 16, KKJJ would be replaced with a simulcast of sister station KXNT. On August 16, at 5:03 pm, after playing "Talk Talk" by Talk Talk, KKJJ began simulcasting KXNT. With the change, the station changed call letters to KXNT-FM.

On September 4, 2015, at 9 am, after stunting for an hour with songs from multiple genres and liners redirecting KXNT listeners to 840 AM, KXNT-FM flipped to rhythmic hot AC as "Q100.5". The first song on "Q100.5" was "This Is How We Do It" by Montell Jordan. The station changed to its current KXQQ-FM call sign on September 28, 2015.

On February 2, 2017, CBS Radio announced it would merge with Entercom. The merger was approved on November 9, and was consummated on November 17.
