= West Indian Americans =

Americans of Caribbean birth or descent

Caribbean Americans
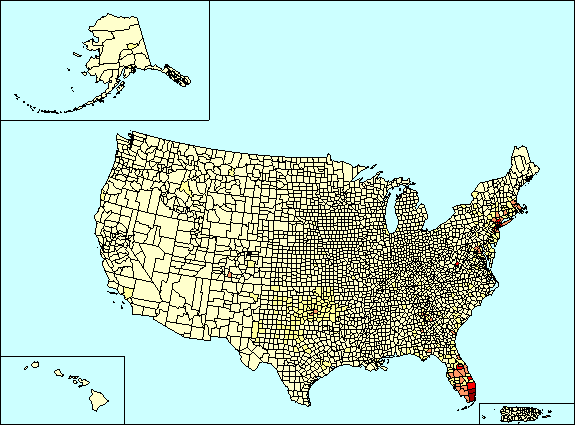
- Distribution of Caribbean Americans

Total population
- 13 million (about 4% of total U.S. population)

Regions with significant populations
- Mainly in the metropolitan area of New York and Miami, to a lesser degree Orlando, Tampa, Boston, Philadelphia, Washington and Atlanta, among others. Majority in the states of New York, Florida, New Jersey, Massachusetts, Pennsylvania, Connecticut, Maryland and Georgia and the U.S. territories of Puerto Rico and the U.S. Virgin Islands. Smaller populations in Rhode Island, Ohio, Michigan, Illinois, Wisconsin, Delaware, Virginia, Kentucky, North Carolina, South Carolina, Missouri, Iowa, South Dakota, Minnesota, Mississippi, Louisiana, Oklahoma, Texas, Washington, Oregon, Colorado and California.

Languages
- American English, Caribbean Standard English dialects, English-based creole languages (Jamaican Patois, Guyanese Creole, Trinidadian Creole, Tobagonian Creole, Bajan Creole, Sranan Tongo, Bahamian Creole, Belizean Creole, Virgin Islands Creole, etc.), Caribbean Spanish (Dominican Spanish, Puerto Rican Spanish, Cuban Spanish, Belizean Spanish, Trinidadian Spanish), French, French-based creole languages (Haitian Creole, Antillean Creole, Dominican Creole, Saint Lucian Creole, Grenadian Creole French, Trinidadian French-Creole, French Guianese Creole), Dutch (Surinamese Dutch), Papiamento, Belizean Mayan, Garifuna, Caribbean Hindustani, Chinese, Hindi-Urdu, Sindhi, German, Levantine Arabic, Indigenous languages

Religion
- Predominantly: Christianity, Hinduism, Islam Minority: Rastafari, Traditional African Religion, Afro-American religions, Amerindian Religion, Buddhism, Judaism, Sikhism, Jainism, Baháʼí, East Asian religions

Caribbean born Populations, 1960-2009
Year	Number
1960	193,922
1970	675,108
1980	1,258,363
1990	1,938,348
2000	2,953,066
2009	3,465,890

Caribbean Americans or West Indian Americans are Americans who trace their ancestry to the Caribbean. The region is home to people of many different national, ethnic, and religious origins. As a result, Caribbean Americans are a multi-ethnic and multi-racial group that trace their ancestry further in time to Europe, Africa, Asia, and the Indigenous peoples of the Americas. As of 2016, about 13 million — about 4% of the total U.S. population — have Caribbean ancestry.

The Caribbean is the source of the United States' earliest and largest island immigrant group and the primary source of growth of the islander population in the U.S. The region has exported more of its people than any other region of the world since the abolition of slavery in 1834.

The largest Caribbean immigrant sources to the U.S. are Cuba, the Dominican Republic, Jamaica, Haiti, Guyana, Trinidad and Tobago, and Barbados. U.S. citizens from Puerto Rico and the U.S. Virgin Islands also migrate to the US proper (known as Stateside Puerto Ricans and Stateside Virgin Islands Americans, respectively).

== Caribbean immigration to the United States ==
=== 17th to mid-19th century ===
In 1613, Juan (Jan) Rodriguez from Santo Domingo became the first non-indigenous person to settle in what was then known as New Amsterdam.

The West Indian migration to the modern United States began in the colonial period, when many West Indians were imported as slaves to the British colonies of North America.

First people from West Indies who arrived in the United States were slaves brought to South Carolina in the 17th century. These slaves, many of whom were born in Africa, number among the first people of African origin imported to the British colonies of North America. Over time, Barbadian slaves would make up a significant part of the Black population in Virginia, mainly in the Virginia tidewater region of the Chesapeake Bay. The number of enslaved Africans bought from the Caribbean increased in the 18th century, as the British colonies of Southeast of North America (part of the modern United States) broadened its commercial ties with other Caribbean islands.

Enslaved Africans in the Caribbean were more numerous than those in places such as New York, which was the main slave enclave in the northeastern of the modern-day United States. The number of enslaved Africans imported from the Caribbean decreased after the New York Slave Revolt of 1712, as many white colonists blamed the incident on slaves recently arrived from the Caribbean. Between 1715 and 1741 most of the slaves of the colony remained from the West Antilles (hailing from Jamaica, Barbados and Antigua). After the New York slave revolt of 1741, slaves imported from the Caribbean were severely curtailed, and most enslaved Africans were brought directly from Africa.

Although migration from the West Indies to the United States was not very important in the first years of the 19th century, it grew considerably after the end of the American Civil War in 1865, which brought about the abolition of slavery. Most of them were fleeing from poverty and certain natural phenomena (hurricanes, droughts and floods). So, the West Indians that lived in the United States increased from only 4,000 people in 1850 to more than 20,000 in 1900, while in 1930 there were already almost 100,000 people from the region living in the United States.

In the 19th century the U.S. attracted many Caribbean craftsmen, scholars, teachers, preachers, doctors, inventors, clergy, (the Barbadian Joseph Sandiford Atwell was the first black man after the Civil War to be ordained in the Episcopal Church), comedians (as the Bahamian Bert Williams), politicians (as Robert Brown Elliott, U.S. Congressman and Attorney General of South Carolina), poets, songwriters, and activists (as the brothers James Weldon and John Rosamond Johnson). From the end of the 19th century up to 1905, most West Indian people emigrated to South Florida, New York and Massachusetts. However, shortly after, New York would become the main destination for the West Indian immigrants.

About half of the population of the New Orleans area have at least distant partial Haitian ancestry originating from a migration wave before and after the Haitian Revolution from the late 1700s up until 1850, of many mixed people, black African slaves and their white French slave masters, and later free black people. Haitians had an impact on the Louisiana Voodoo religion and the Louisiana Creole language. Before 1900, Haitians had the biggest impact of any Caribbean group on the United States. The Haitian Revolution itself resulted in France selling a large swath of land (Louisiana Purchase) to the United States.

=== World War II through the 21st century ===
The Caribbean migration grew during the first thirty years of the 20th century and by 1930 there were almost 100,000 West Indian people living in the United States. At this time, they were the majority of black people migrating to the United States. The migration from the West Indies became noticeable from the 1940s, with the arrived of 50,000 people from the region, both black and white. When the World War II came to an end, American companies hired thousands of Caribbean people, which were known as “W2 workers”.

The companies that hired them were distributed across 1,500 municipalities and 36 US states. Most of the W2 workers worked in the rural areas, especially in Florida, where they were dedicated to the cultivation of sugar cane. However, many of these companies offered depressing working and economic conditions for their new workers. Because of that, many Caribbean workers promoted revolts (even though labor strikes were prohibited in some of these companies) or fled their respective companies in search of jobs with better conditions elsewhere.

Most of the Caribbean, Central America and South America historically have had little tradition of immigration to America before the 1960s. Post 1965, numerous Caribbean farmers migrated to the United States. This was due to the loss of employment in the Caribbean, when the Caribbean replaced agriculture as its main source of income with the tourism and urban sector. Proximity to the U.S., fluency in English and Civil Rights legislation were reasons for the disproportionate numbers of Caribbean outflows.

"The influx of direct, capital-intensive and labor-intensive foreign investment" has significantly increased Caribbean migration to the US and other countries.

Today, there is a fourth wave of Caribbean migration in the United States. The number of Caribbean immigrants raised substantially from 193,922 in 1960 to 2 million in 2009.

== Demography ==
The majority of non-Hispanic West Indian Americans are of Afro-Caribbean descent, especially those with origins in Jamaica, Haiti and the Bahamas. The remaining portion is mainly multiracial and Indo-Caribbean, especially within Guyanese, Trinidadian and Surinamese communities, where people of Indo-Caribbean descent make up a significant portion of the population.

Over 70 percent of Caribbean immigrants to the United States were from Jamaica and Haiti, as of 2010. Guyana, Trinidad and Tobago, Belize, the Bahamas, Barbados, and Saint Lucia, among others, also have significant immigrant populations in the United States. Although sometimes divided by language, West Indian Americans share a common Caribbean culture. Within the Hispanic population, the Puerto Rican, Dominican, Nicaraguan, Honduran, Panamanian, Cuban and Costa Rican populations are the most culturally similar to the non-Hispanic West Indian community.

The majority of Hispanic/Latino Caribbean people are of mixed-race ancestry (Mulatto/Tri-racial), usually having a near even mix of white Spanish, Portuguese, black West African and native Caribbean Taino. Though, African ancestry is slightly stronger among Dominican and Puerto Rican multiracials, while among Cuban multiracials European ancestry is slightly stronger. Many of these European-dominant multiracials in Cuba self identify solely as "white" for historical reasons, however when they arrive to the US mainland many of them often start to see race differently and may choose to identify as Black or multiracial. There is also significant numbers of actual white and black people among these groups.

Many black Afro-Latinos in the Spanish-speaking countries of Central America often have cultures that resemble the English Caribbean, due to various historical events, such as Caribbean coastal areas of these countries originally being English colonies and after these countries were established there was migration from the English Caribbean to the Caribbean coast of Central America. This is especially true of the black people in Panama, this is because at least half of the Afro-Panamanian population is descended from Jamaican immigrants who came to Panama in the early 1900s, many are bilingual in Spanish and English, and consider themselves to be West Indian as well.

=== Caribbean American communities ===
Caribbean American Ancestries
Country/region of ancestry	Caribbean American population (2016 Census)
Puerto Rican	5,588,664
Cuban	2,315,863
Dominican	2,081,419
Jamaican	1,132,460
Haitian	1,049,779
Guyanese	243,498
Trinidadian and Tobagonian	227,523
British West Indies; Anguilla; Cayman Islands; Turks and Caicos Islands; Montserrat; British Virgin Islands	103,244
Barbadian	71,482
Belizean	62,369
Bahamian	55,637
Dutch West Indian; Aruba; Bonaire; Curaçao; Sint Eustatius; Sint Maarten; Saba	42,808
Grenadian	25,924
Virgin Islands	20,375
Antiguan and Barbudan	15,199
Saint Lucian	14,592
Vincentian	13,547
Kittitian and Nevisian	6,368
Dominican	6,071
Bermudian	5,823
Surinamese	2,833
Aruban	1,970
French West Indies; Guadeloupe; Martinique; Saint Pierre and Miquelon; Saint Martin; Saint Barthélemy	1,915
French Guiana	1,128
Sint Maarten	352
Total	13 million

=== Locations ===
In Florida 549,722 West Indians (excluding Hispanic origin groups) were foreign born as of 2016. Florida had the largest number of resident West Indian (excluding Hispanic origin groups) immigrants in 2016, followed by New York with 490,826 according to the US census.

As of 2016, 9.8% (4,286,266) of the total foreign born residence in the United States was born in the Caribbean.

Parts of Florida and New York, as well as numerous areas throughout the entire New England region are the only areas where black people of recent Caribbean origin outnumber black people of multi-generational American origin. Miami, New York City, Boston and Orlando have the highest percentages of non-Hispanic West Indian-Americans, and are also the only major cities where black people of Caribbean origin outnumber those of multigenerational American origin. Areas in New Jersey, Pennsylvania, Maryland and Georgia do have significant and growing West Indian communities but are heavily overshadowed by much larger populations of native-born American Blacks.

Of the 2 groups who make up majority of West Indian Americans of non-Hispanic origin, Haitians are more likely to move to an area with a large overall Caribbean populations, while Jamaicans are more spread out and more likely to be found in cities with smaller Caribbean communities. Caribbean populations in Florida and New England are diverse but more Haitian-dominated, while Caribbean populations in the NYC-Philly-DC area are also diverse but more Jamaican-dominated.

In 2016, 18% (3,750,000) of Florida's population reported ancestry from the Caribbean.

State/territory	Non-Hispanic West Indian-American population (2010 Census)	Percentage (Note: Percentage of the state population that identifies itself as West Indian relative to the state/territory population as a whole.)
Alabama	8,850	0.1
Alaska	1,195	0.1
Arizona	7,676	0.1
Arkansas	5,499	0.2
California	76,968	0.2
Colorado	7,076	0.1
Connecticut	87,149	2.4
Delaware	6,454	0.8
District of Columbia	7,785	1.2
Florida	927,031	4.5
(Georgia (U.S. state)) Georgia	128,599	1.25
Hawaii	2,816	0.2
Idaho	694	0.0
Illinois	27,038	0.2
Indiana	7,420	0.1
Iowa	1,710	0.0
Kansas	2,775	0.0
Kentucky	5,407	0.1
Louisiana	7,290	0.1
Maine	2,023	0.1
Maryland	62,358	1.0
Massachusetts	123,226	1.9
Michigan	15,482	0.1
Minnesota	6,034	0.1
Mississippi	1,889	0.0
Missouri	6,509	0.1
Montana	593	0.0
Nebraska	1,629	0.0
Nevada	5,967	0.2
New Hampshire	2,766	0.2
New Jersey	141,828	1.6
New Mexico	2,869	0.1
New York	844,064	4.3
North Carolina	32,283	0.3
North Dakota	377	0.0
Ohio	14,844	0.1
Oklahoma	21,187	0.5
Oregon	3,896	0.1
Pennsylvania	74,799	0.6
Rhode Island	6,880	0.7
South Carolina	10,865	0.2
South Dakota	474	0.0
Tennessee	6,130	0.0
Texas	70,000	0.2
Utah	1,675	0.0
Vermont	375	0.0
Virginia	40,172	0.5
Washington	8,766	0.1
West Virginia	1,555	0.0
Wisconsin	5,623	0.0
Wyoming	526	0.0
USA	4 million	1.3%

Top Concentrations of Caribbean Immigrants by Metropolitan Area, 2019-2023.
Metropolitan Area	Immigrant Population from the Caribbean	% of the Metro Area Population
New York City-Newark-Hartford, NY-NJ-CT	1,347,000	6.82%
Miami-Fort Lauderdale-West Palm Beach, FL	1,264,000	20.6%
Boston-Cambridge-Newton, MA-NH	174,000	3.54%
Orlando-Kissimmee-Sanford, FL	160,000	5.87%
Tampa-St. Petersburg-Clearwater, FL	139,000	4.29%
Atlanta-Sandy Springs-Roswell, GA	104,000	1.69%
Philadelphia-Camden-Wilmington, PA-NJ-DE-MD	92,000	1.47%
Washington-Arlington-Alexandria, DC-VA-MD-WV	68,000	1.08%
Houston-The Woodlands-Sugar Land, TX	69,000	0.95%
Lee County, Florida	55,000	6.69%
Los Angeles-Long Beach-Anaheim, CA	34,000	0.26%

=== U.S. Counties with largest non-Latino Caribbean American populations in 2016 ===
1. Kings County, New York 305,950 (11.6%)
2. Broward County, Florida 277,646 (14.5%)
3. Miami-Dade County, Florida 184,393 (6.8%)
4. Queens County, New York 166,952 (7.2%)
5. Palm Beach County, Florida 126,020 (8.7%)
6. Bronx County, New York 115,348 (7.9%)

=== Language ===
More than half of Caribbean immigrants either spoke only English or spoke English "very well." In 2009, 33.0 percent of Caribbean immigrants reported speaking only English and 23.9 percent reported speaking English "very well." In contrast, 42.8 percent of Caribbean immigrants were limited English proficient (LEP), meaning they reported speaking English less than "very well." Within this group, 9.7 percent reported that they did not speak English at all, 16.5 percent reported speaking English "well" and 16.7 percent reported speaking English "but not well."

=== Occupations ===
According to the US census for 2016. West Indian Americans of the civilian employed population 16 years and over were 1,549,890. 32.6% were employed in management, business, science, and arts occupations, 28.5% in service occupations, 22.2% in sales and office occupations, 6.1% in natural resources, construction and maintenance occupations and 10.5% in production, transportation and material moving occupations.

=== Income ===
As of 2017 West Indian Americans are estimated to have a median household income of $54,033. West Indians also have a median family income of $62,867. Married-couple family: $80,626, Male householder, no spouse present, family: $53,101, Female householder, no husband present, family: $43,929. Their Individual per capita income (dollars) was $26,033.

=== Education attainment ===
As of 2017, 27.1 percent of West Indian Americans 25 years and over have a bachelor's degree or higher. Male, bachelor's degree or higher was 23.1% and Female, bachelor's degree or higher was 30.3%.

=== Related ethnic groups and topics ===
- Panamanian Americans
- Dominican Americans
- Puerto Rican Americans
- Jamaican Americans
- Cuban Americans
- Costa Rican Americans
- African Americans
- List of Countries in the Caribbean
- History of the Caribbean
- Afro-Caribbean
- Indo-Caribbean Americans
- Spanish Caribbean

== Contributions to American culture ==
There are close to 50 Caribbean carnivals throughout North America that attest to the permanence of the Caribbean immigration experience. The Caribbean people brought music, such as bachata, cadence rampa, calypso, chutney, compas (kompa), cumbia, dancehall, filmi, Latin trap, méringue, merengue, parang, ragga, rapso, reggae, reggaeton, salsa, ska, soca and zouk, which has a profound impact on U.S. popular culture. Caribbean Americans also strongly influenced Hip Hop music and culture in New York City. Cultural expressions and the prominence of first-and second-generation Caribbean figures in U.S. labor and grassroots politics for many decades also testify to the long tradition and established presence.

== Notable Caribbean Americans and Americans of Caribbean descent ==
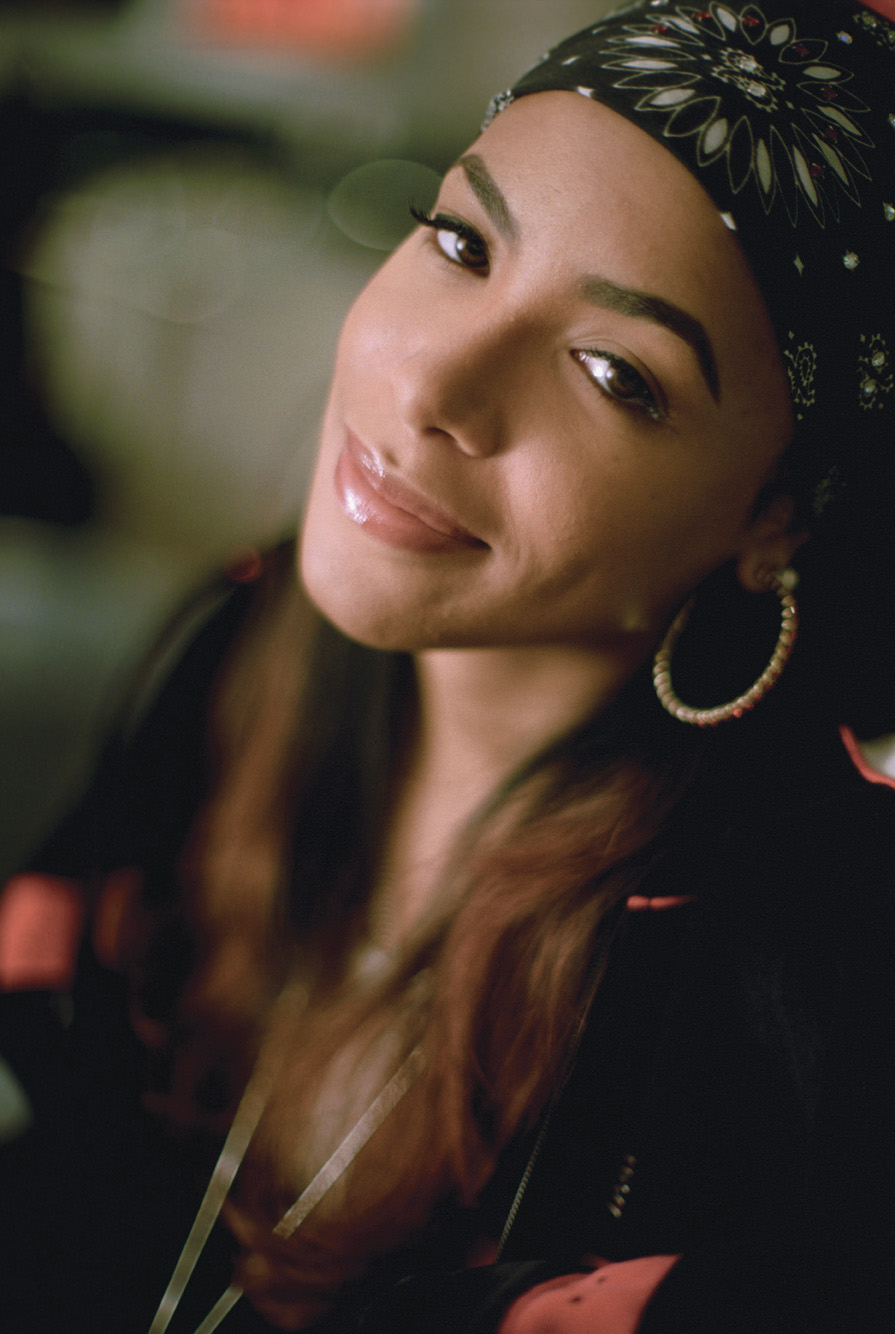
Aaliyah

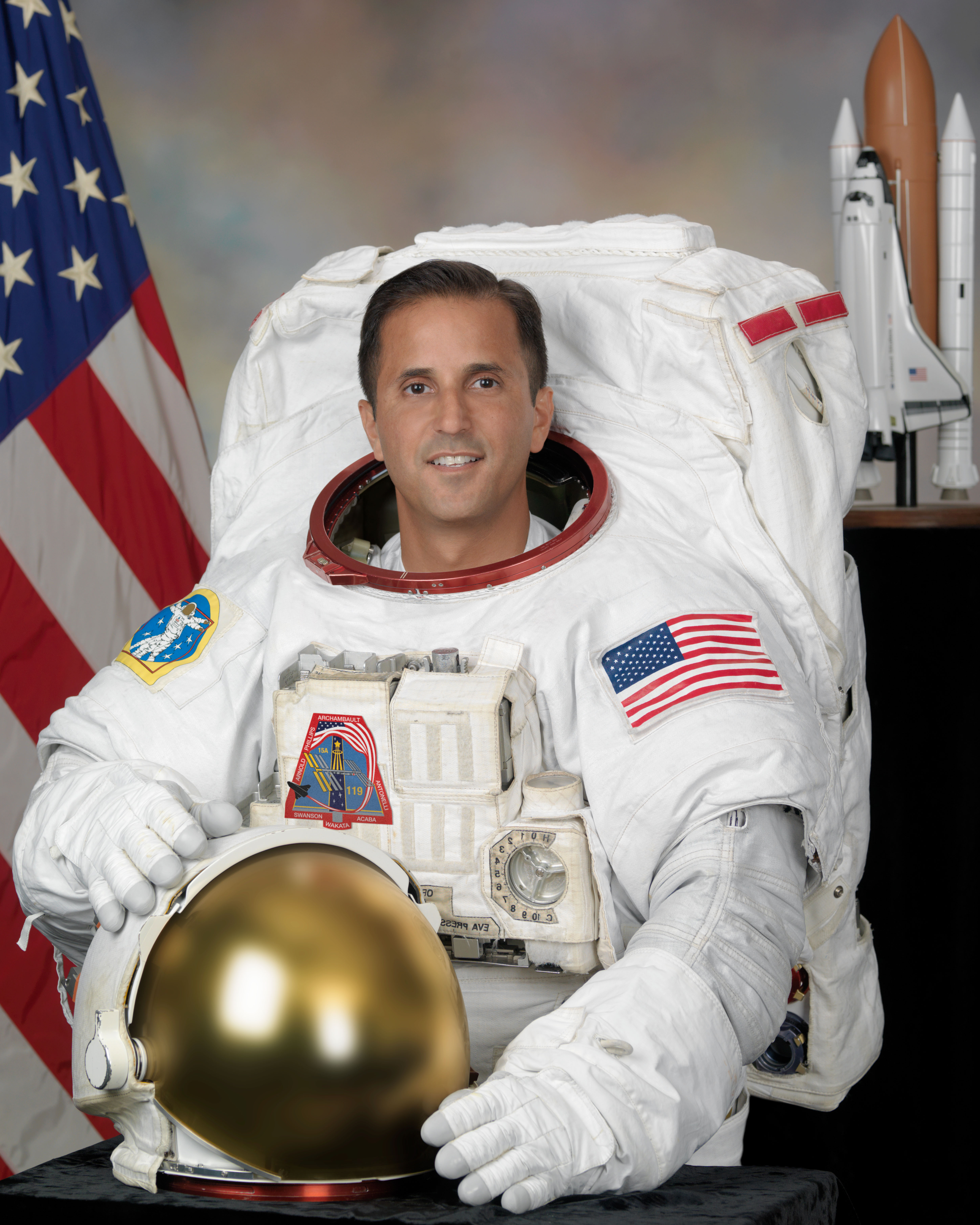
Joseph Acaba

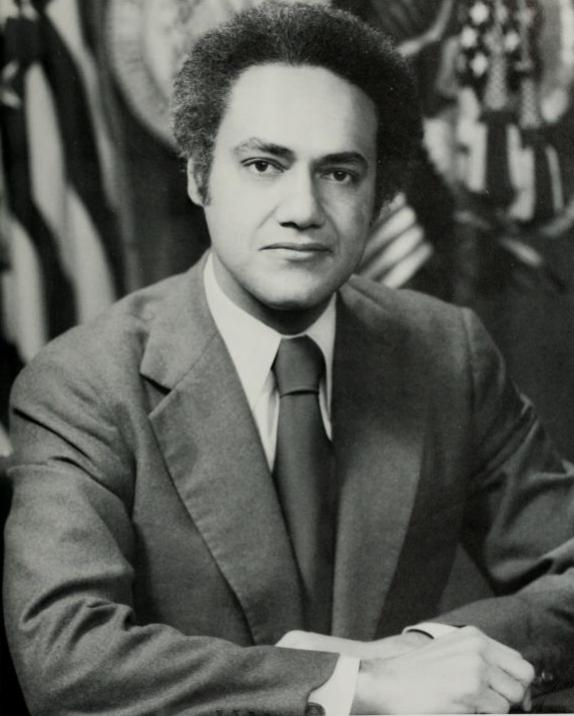
Clifford Alexander Jr.

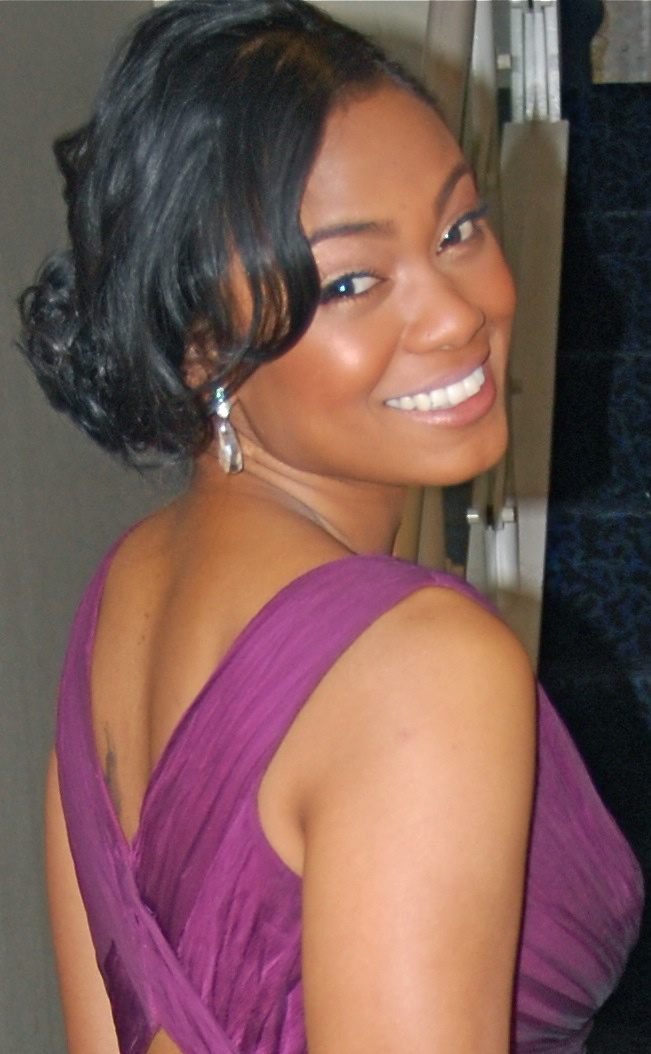
Tatyana Ali

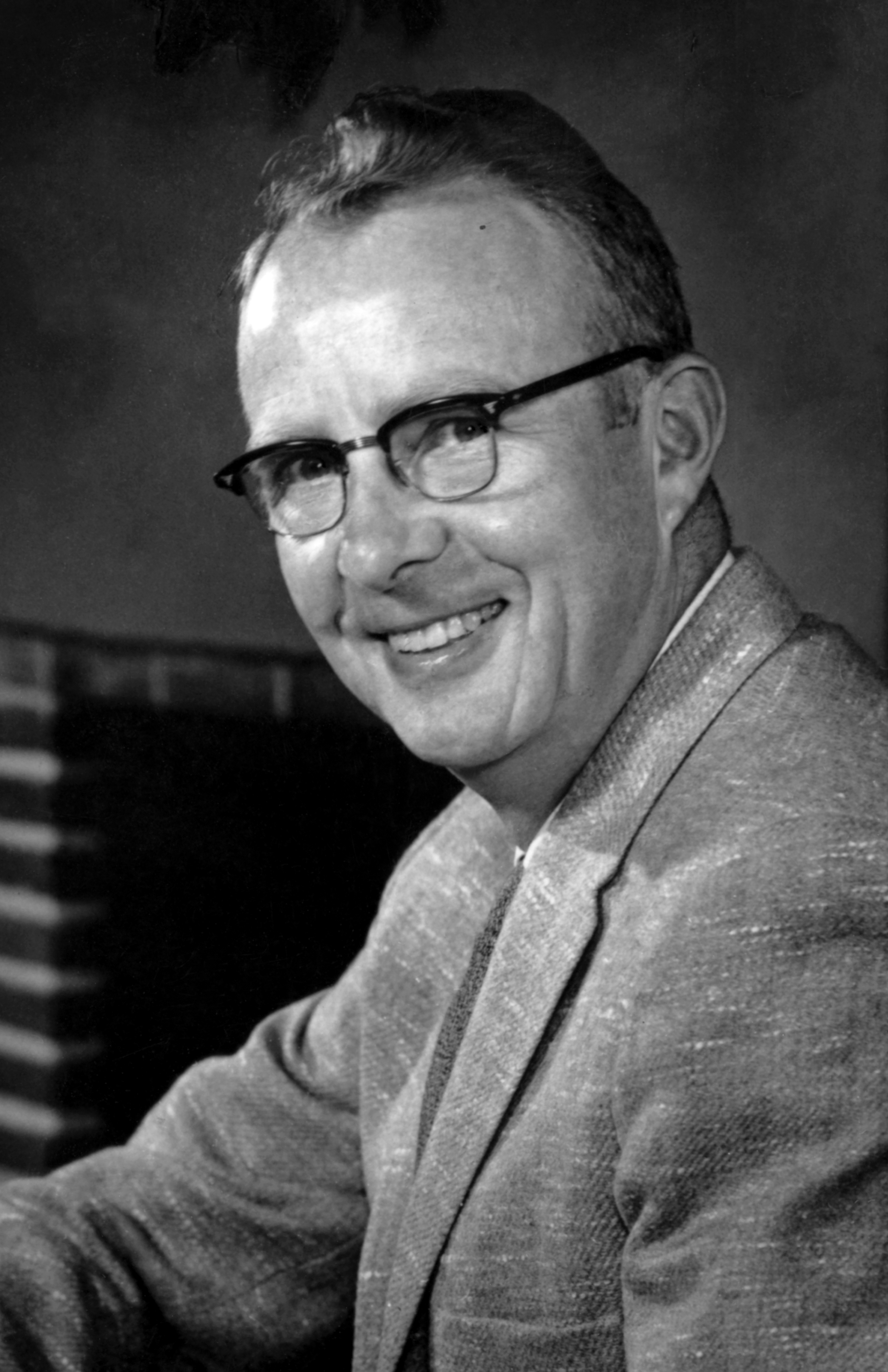
Luis Walter Alvarez

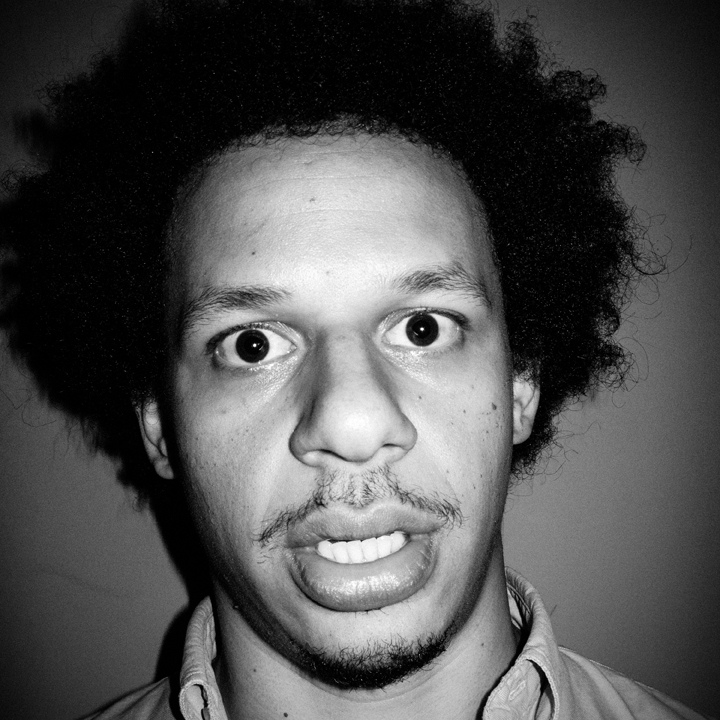
Eric Andre

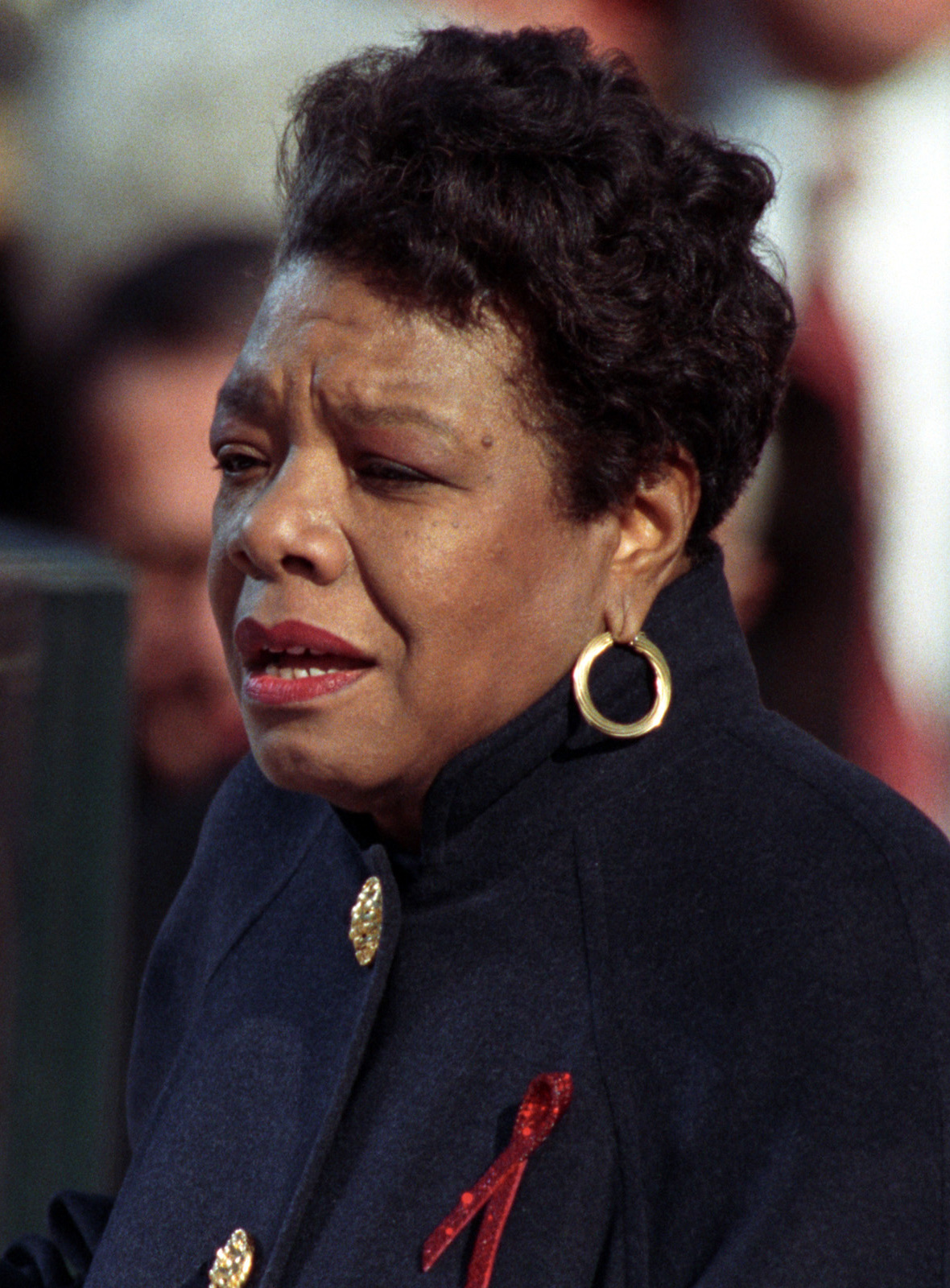
Maya Angelou

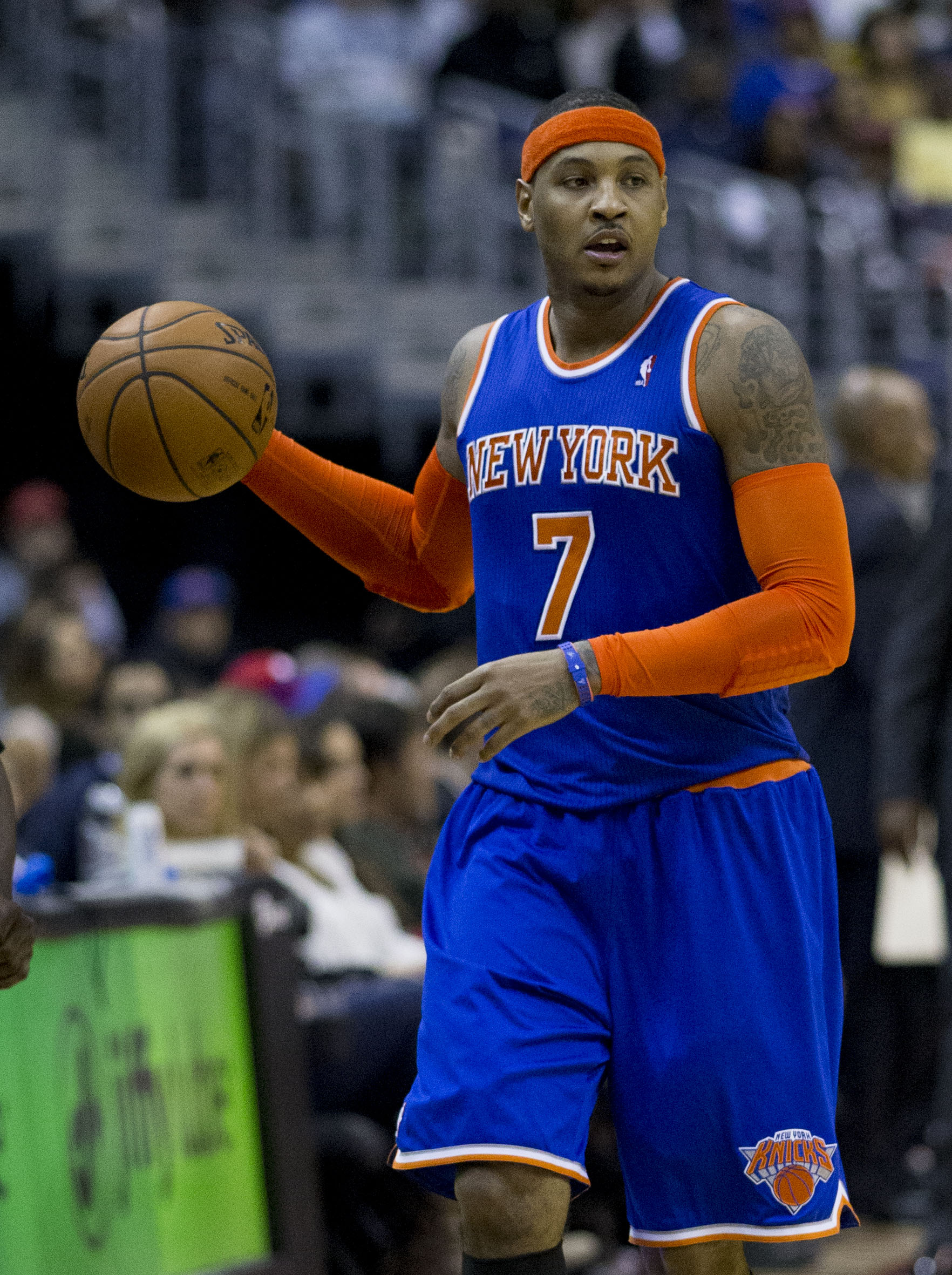
Carmelo Anthony

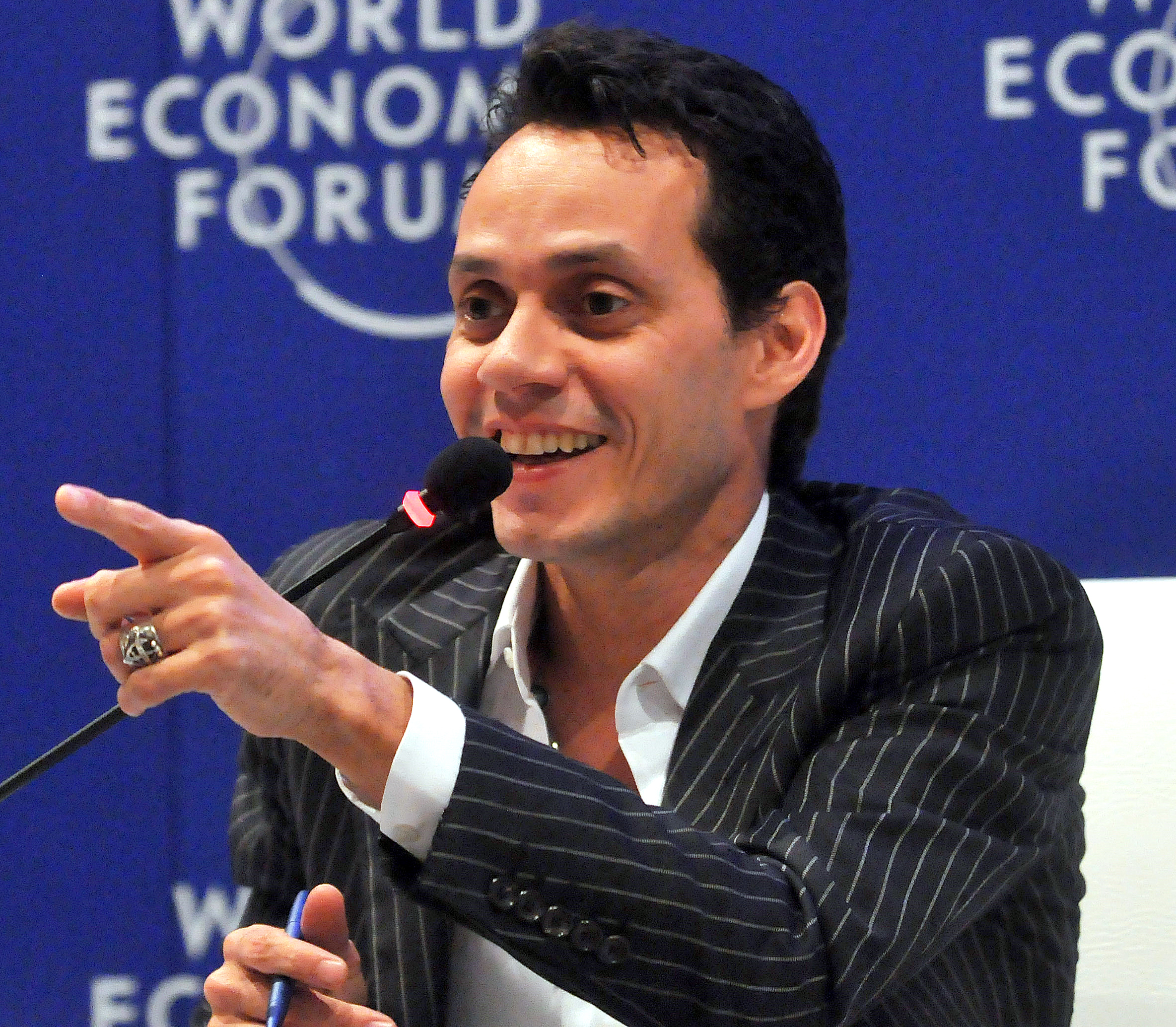
Marc Anthony

Deborah Archer

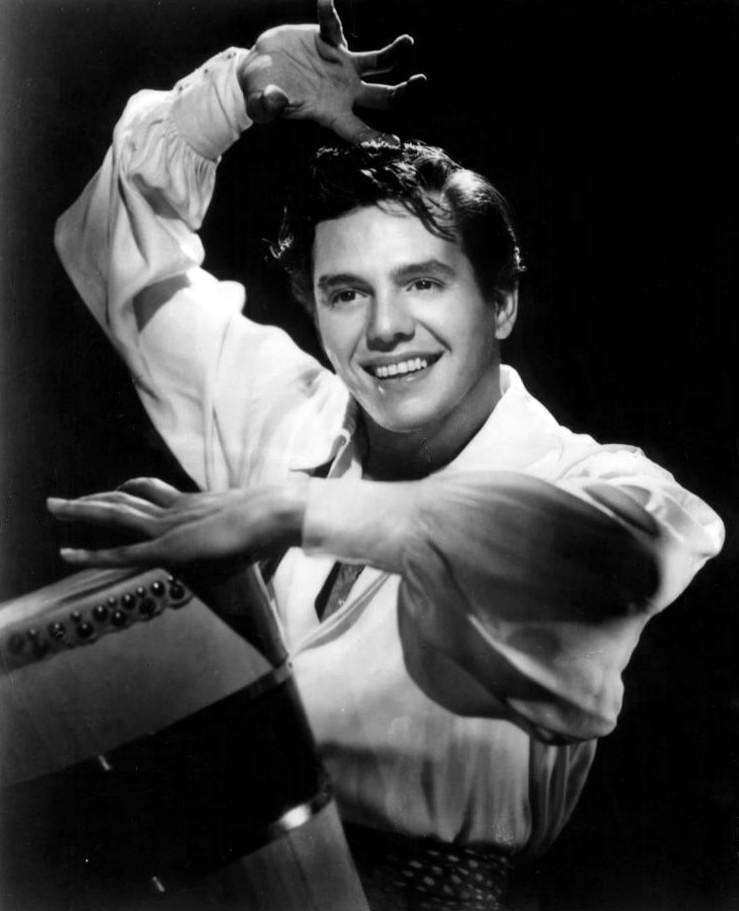
Desi Arnaz

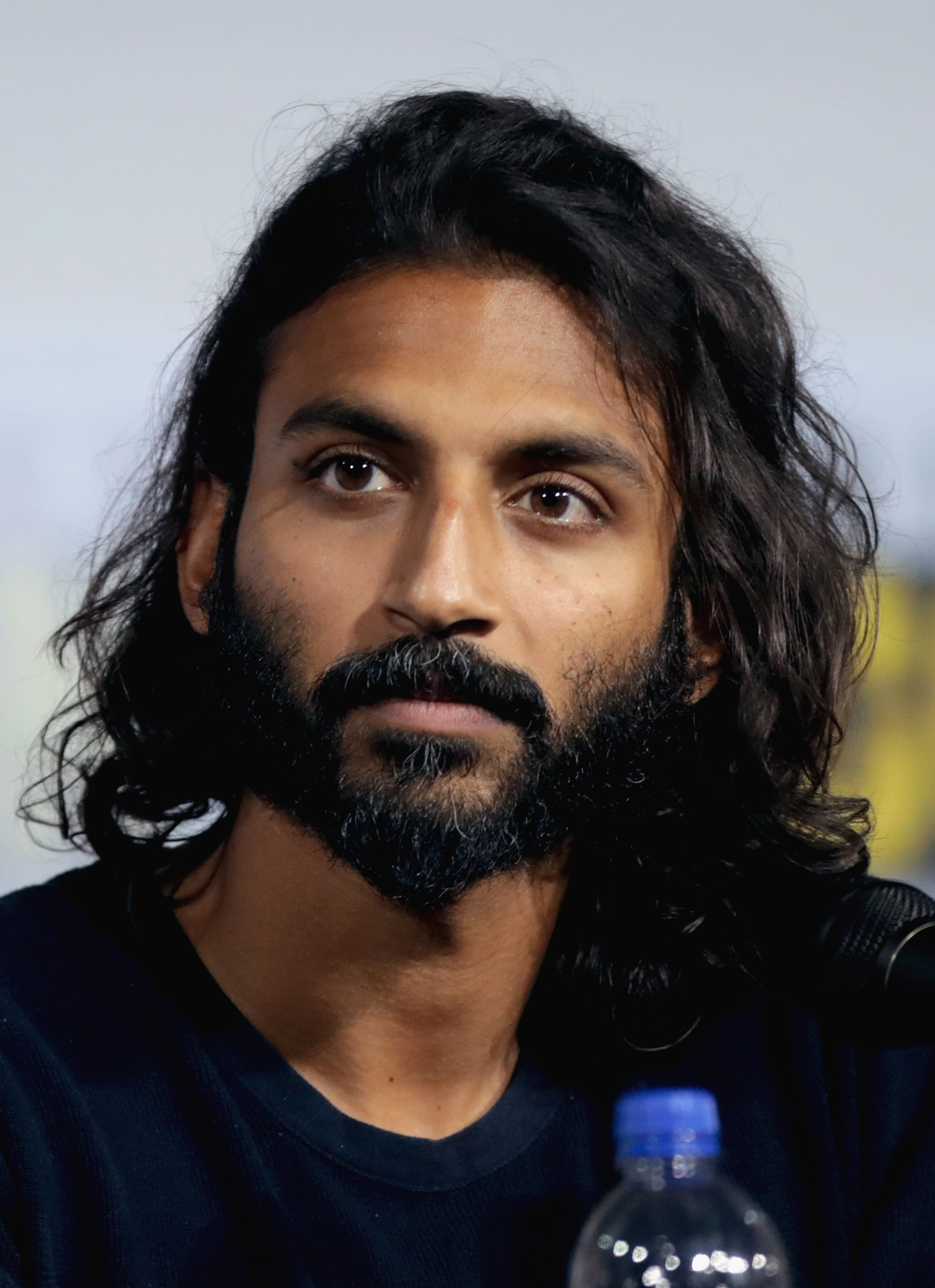
Avi Nash

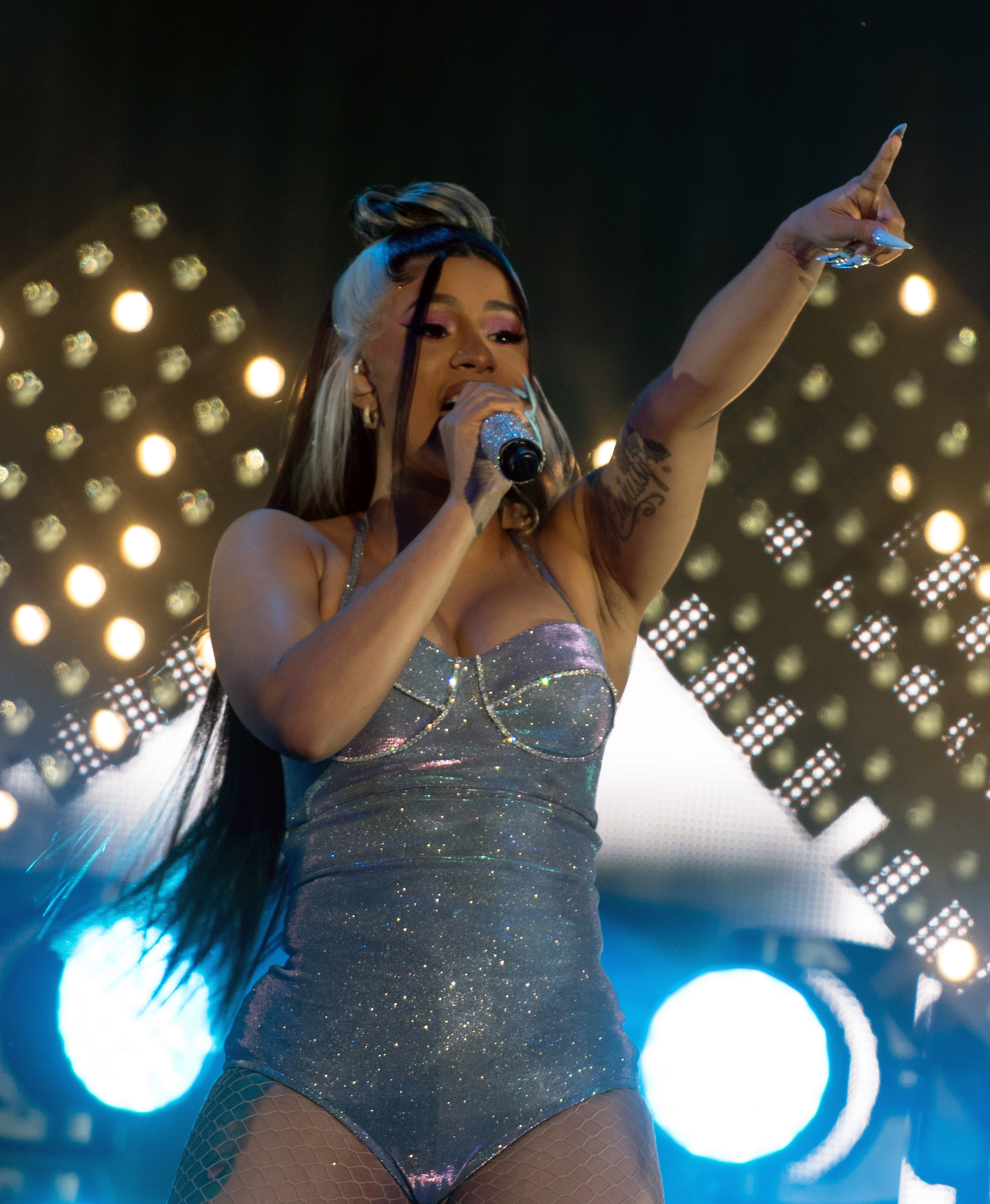
Cardi B

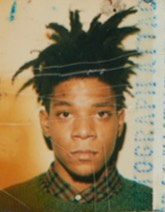
Jean-Michel Basquiat

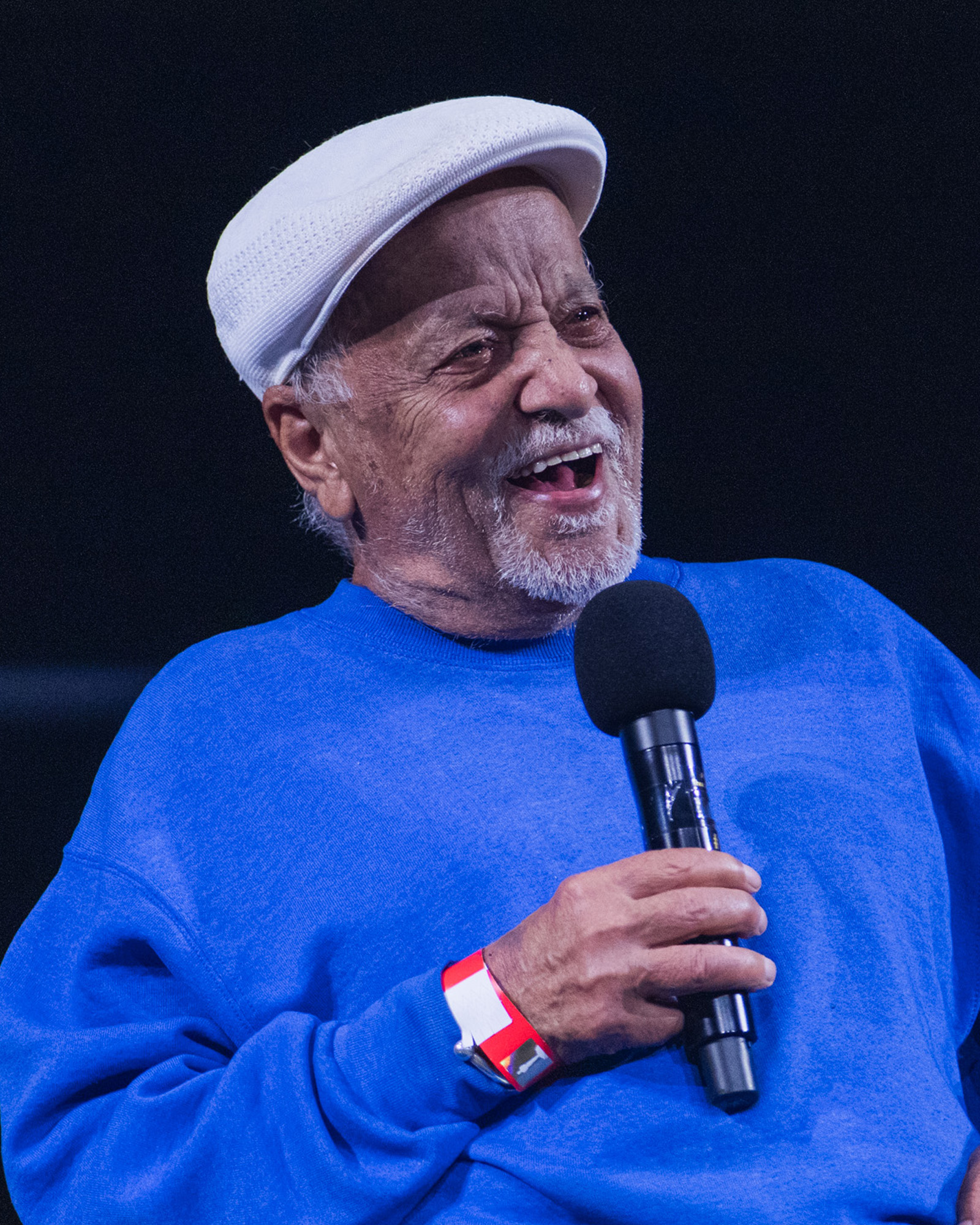
Gerry Bednob

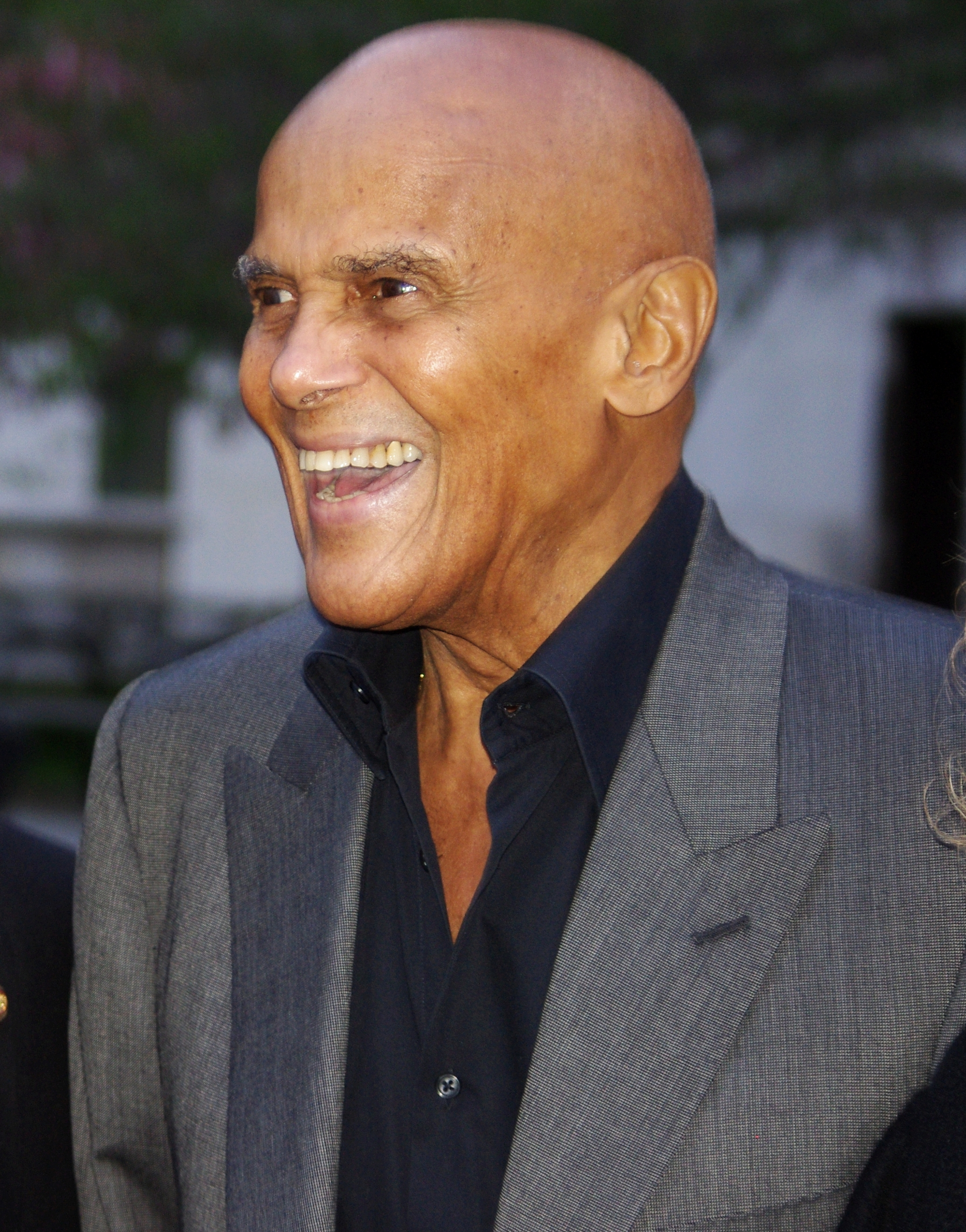
Harry Belafonte

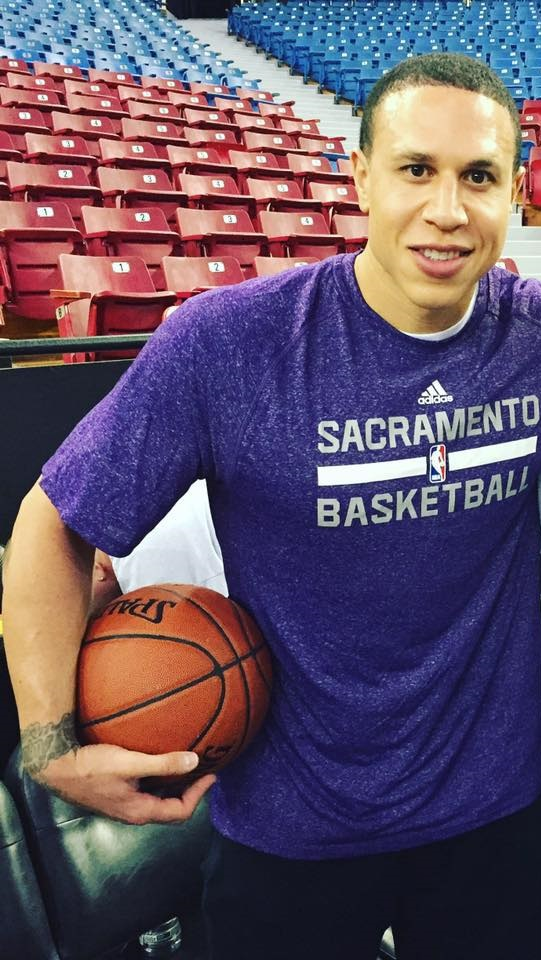
Mike Bibby

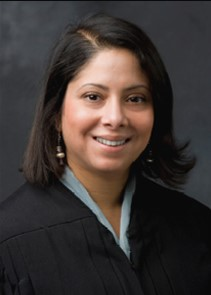
Cathy Bissoon

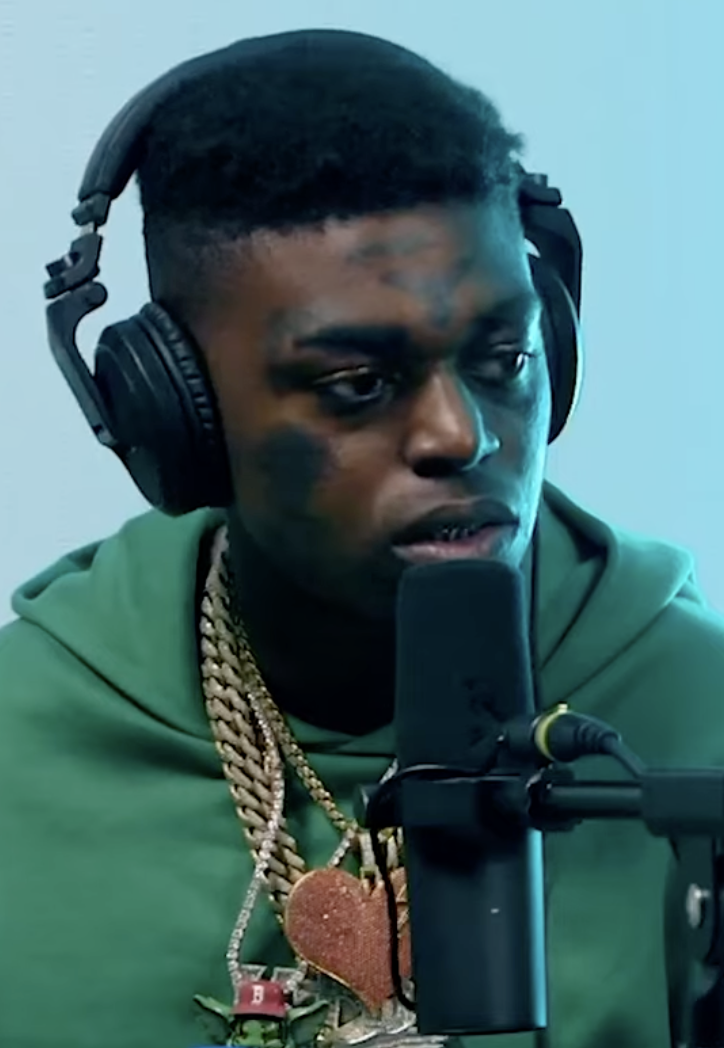
Kodak Black

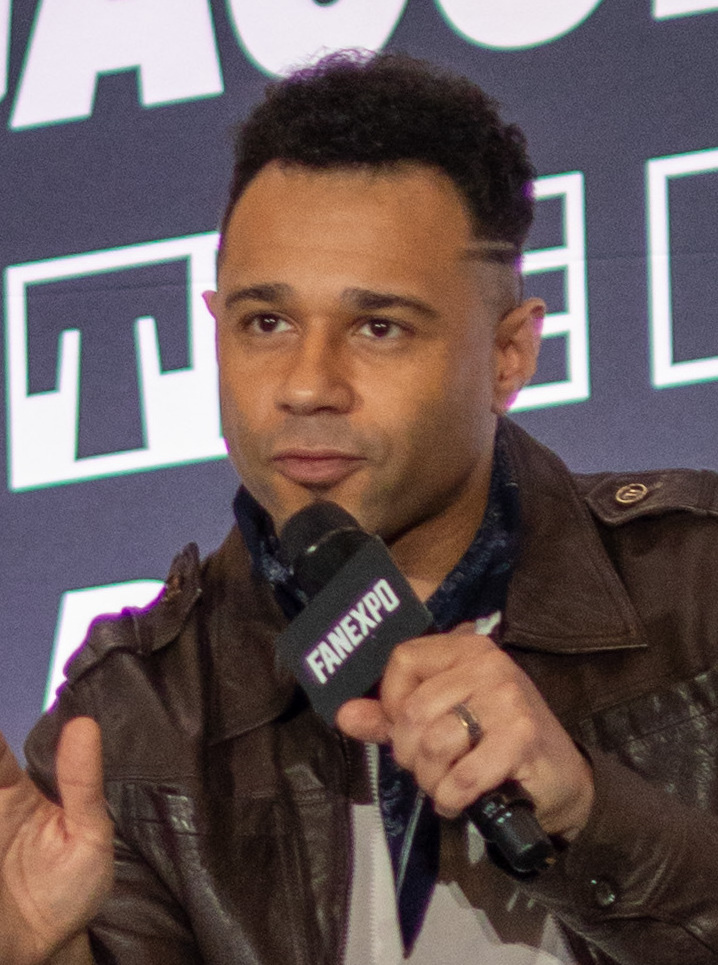
Corbin Bleu

Wayne Brady

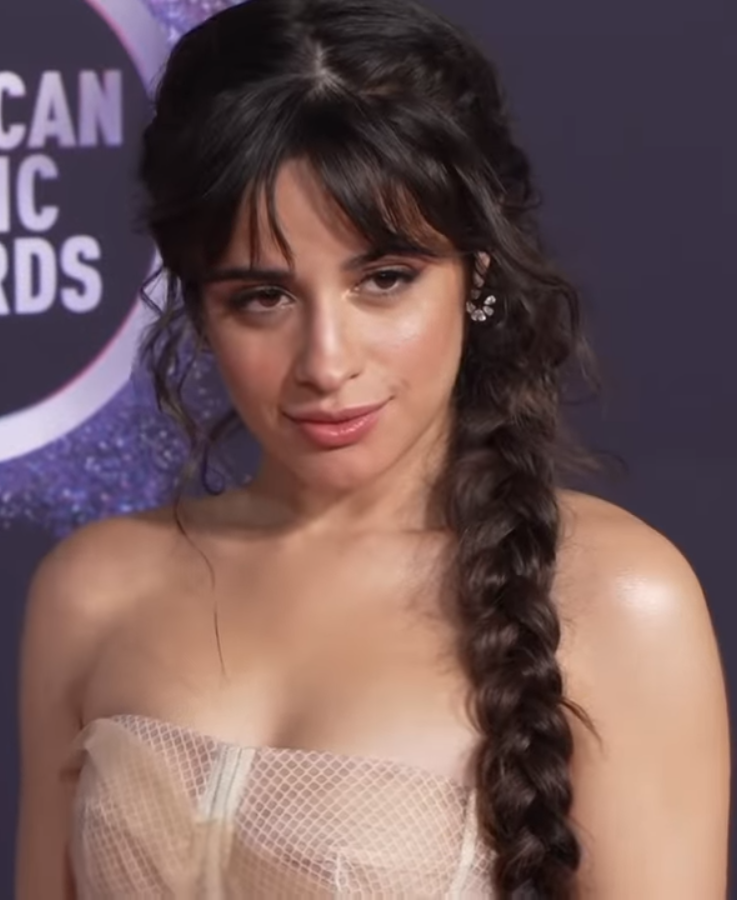
Camila Cabello

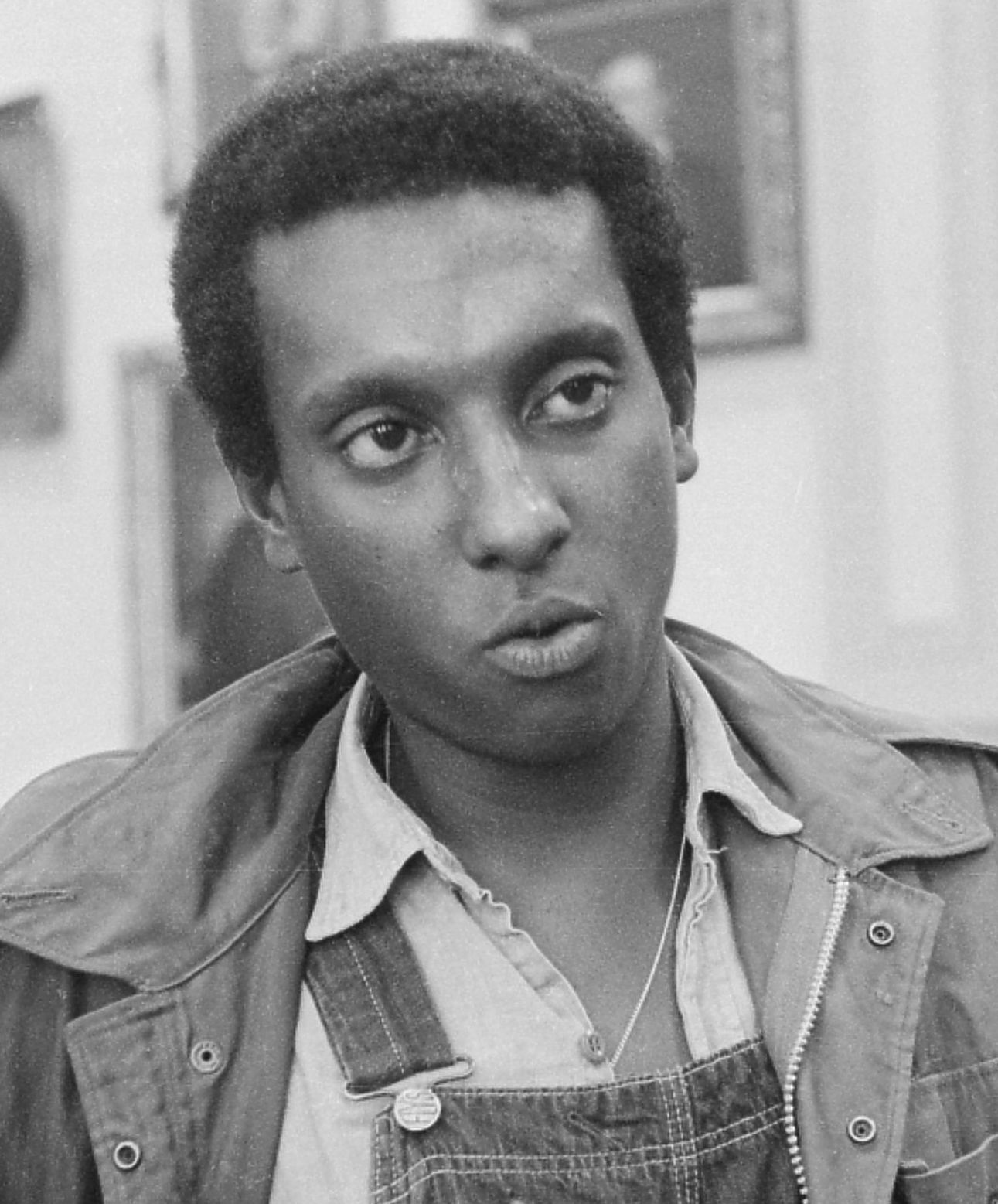
Stokely Carmichael

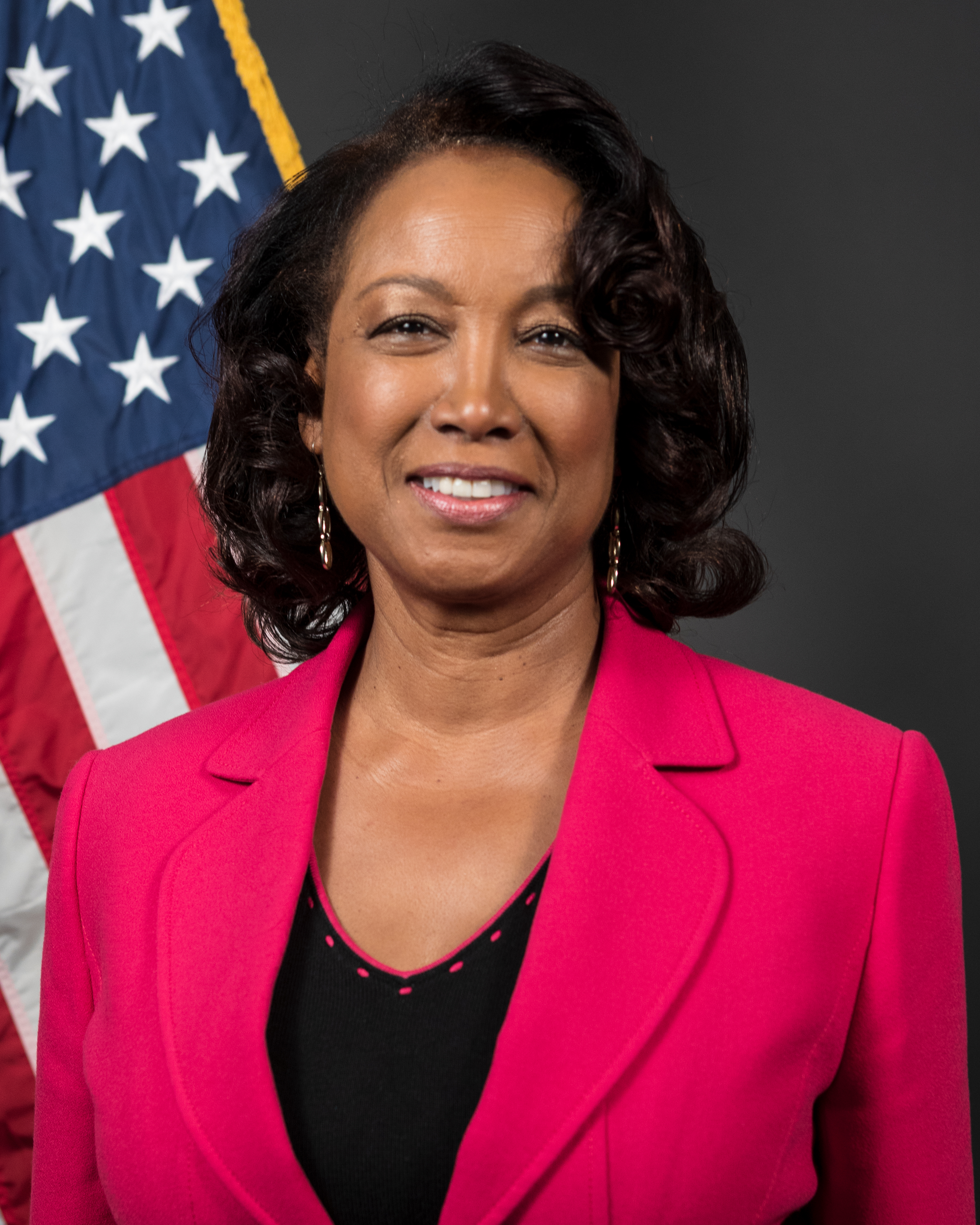
Jennifer Carroll

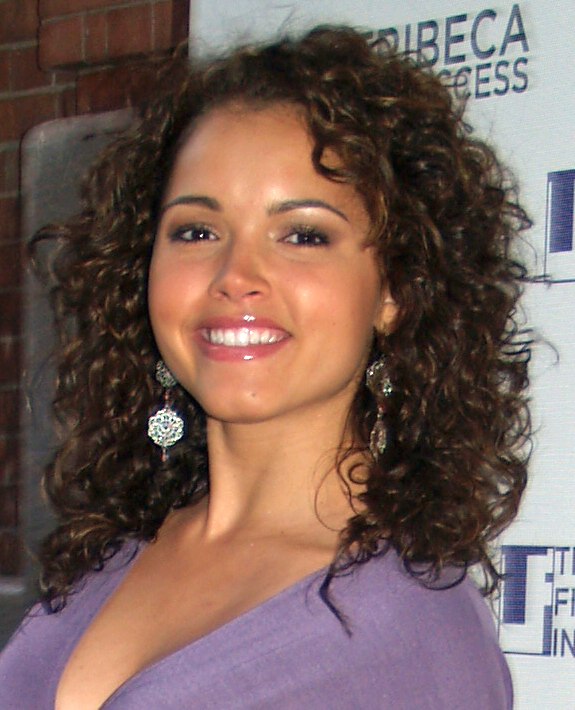
Susie Castillo

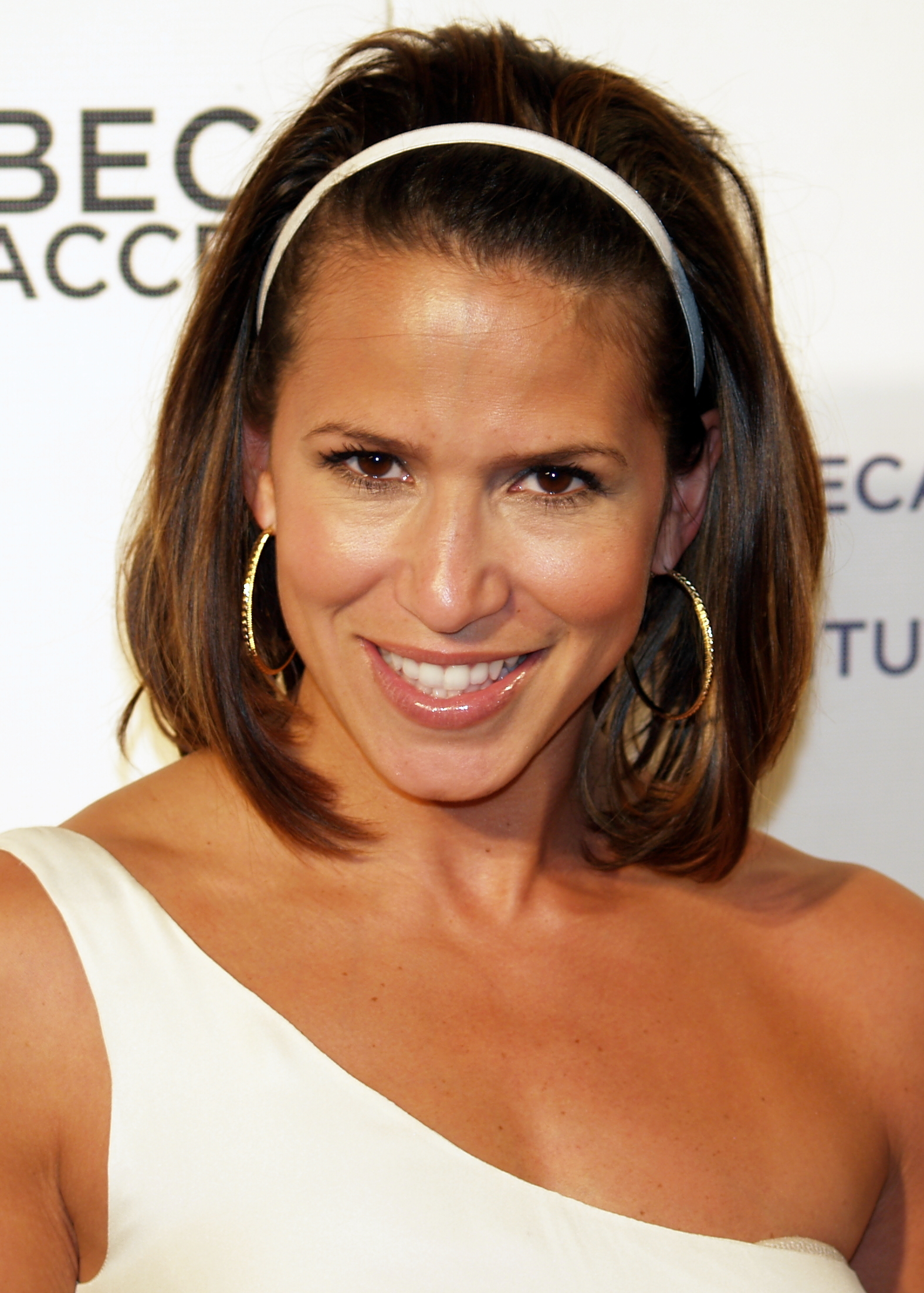
Marysol Castro

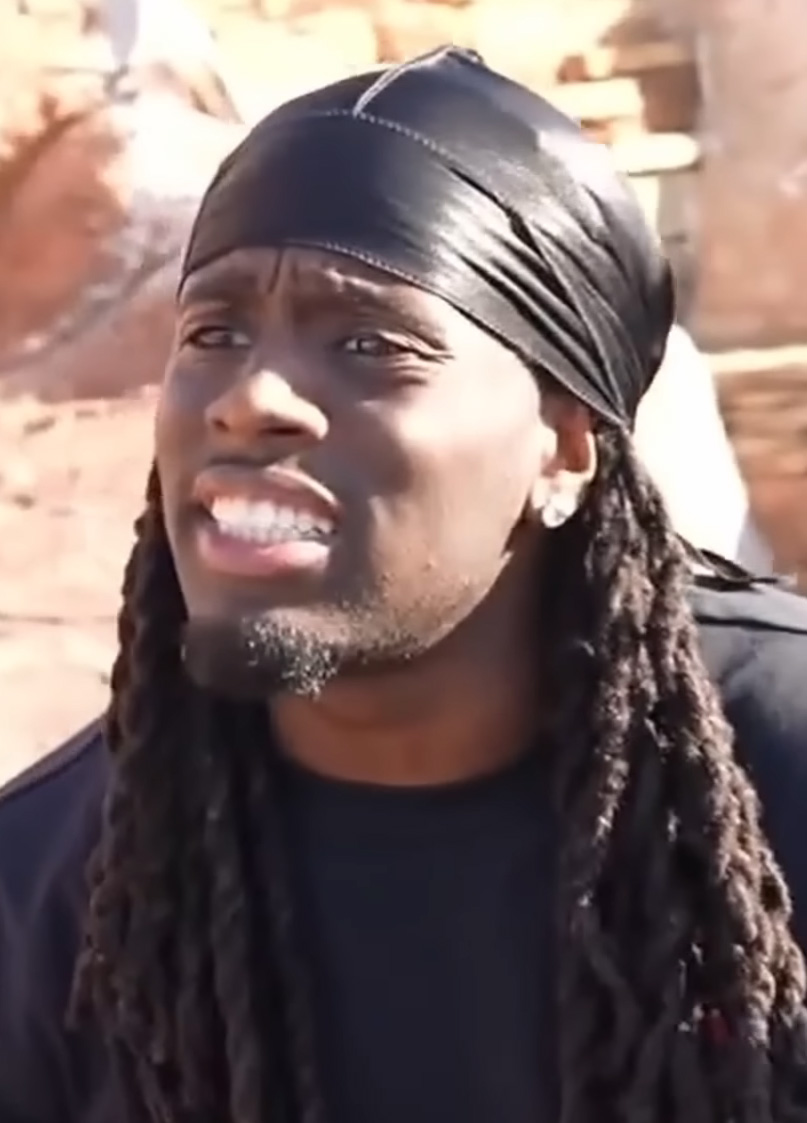
Kai Cenat

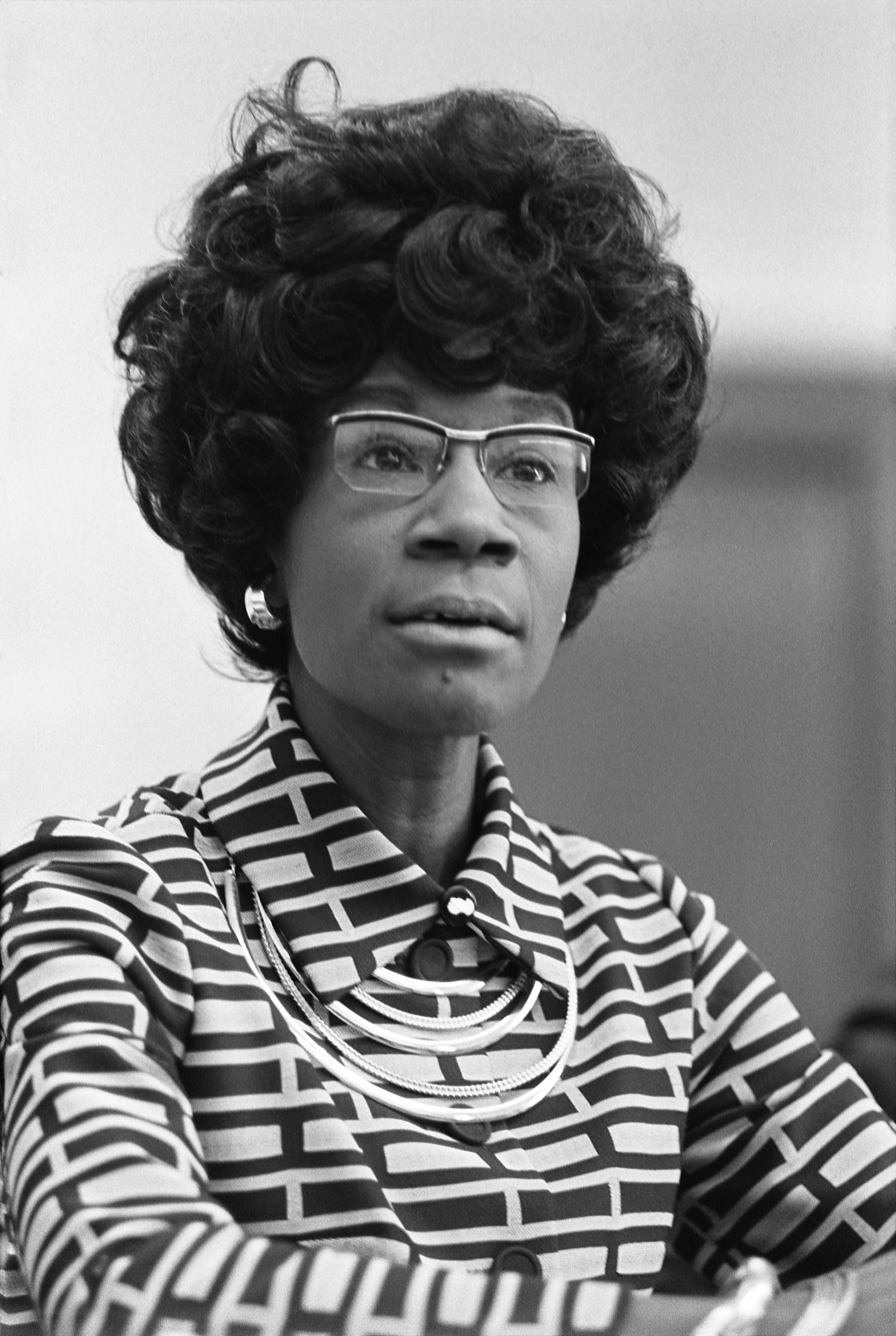
Shirley Chisholm

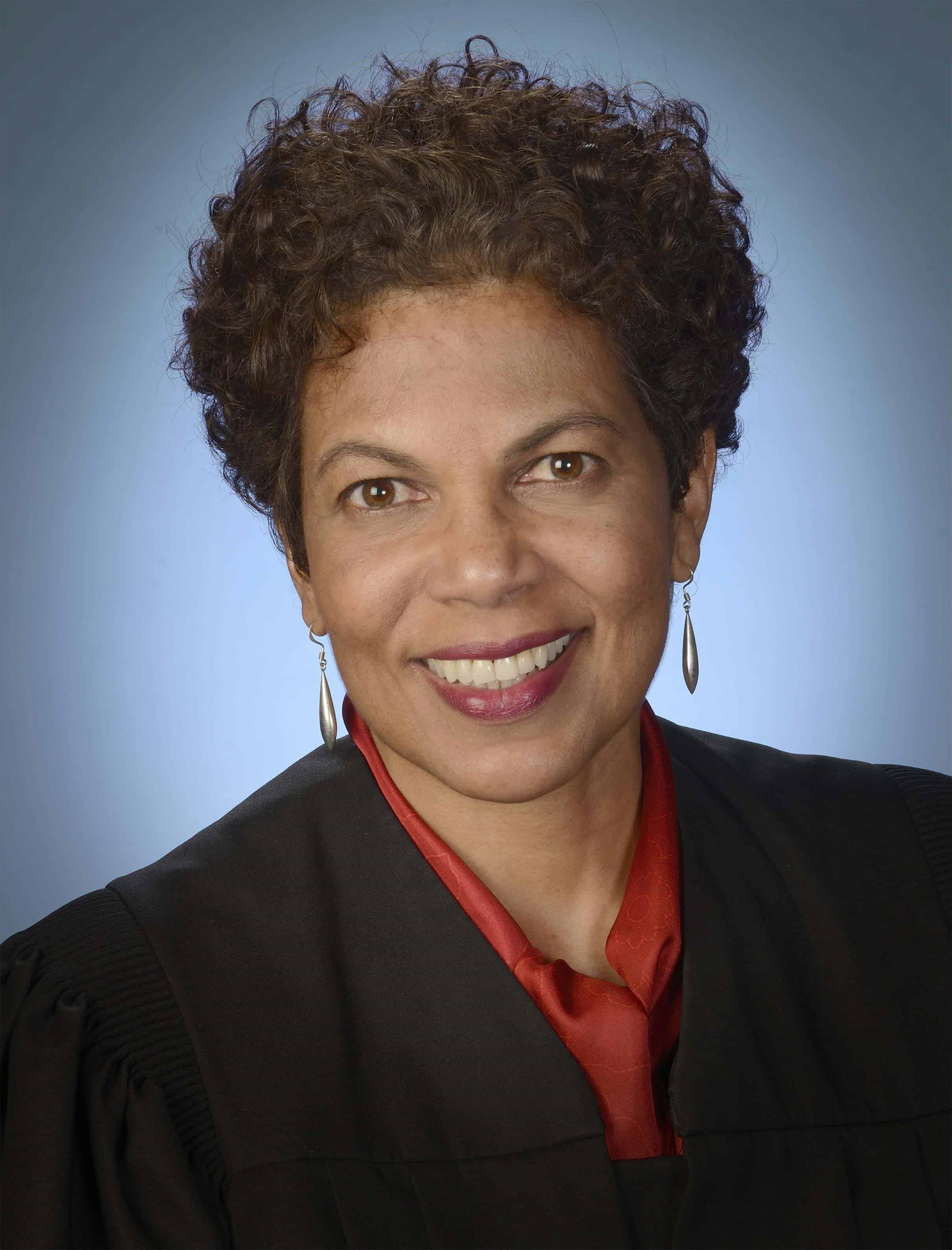
Tanya Chutkan

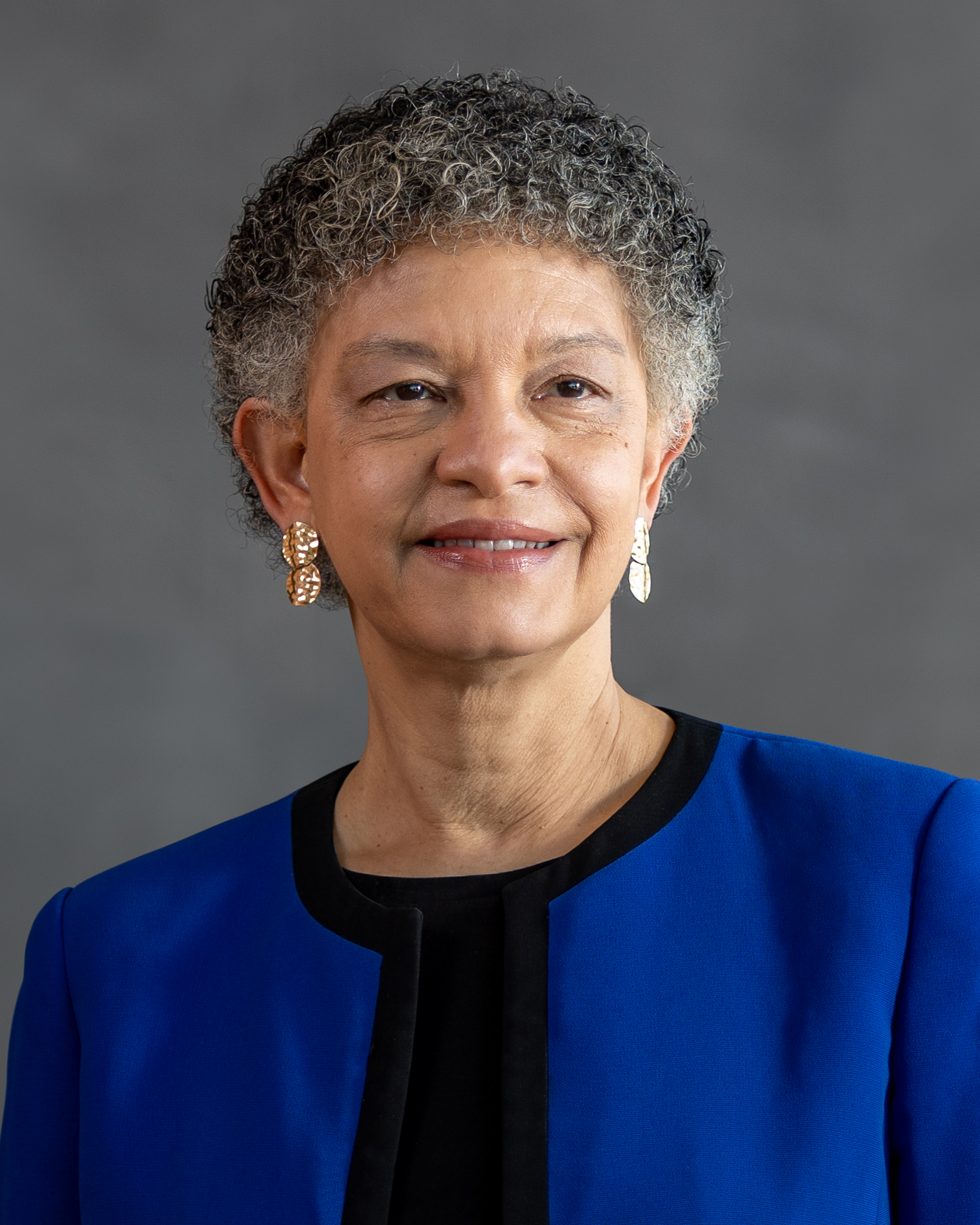
Susan M. Collins

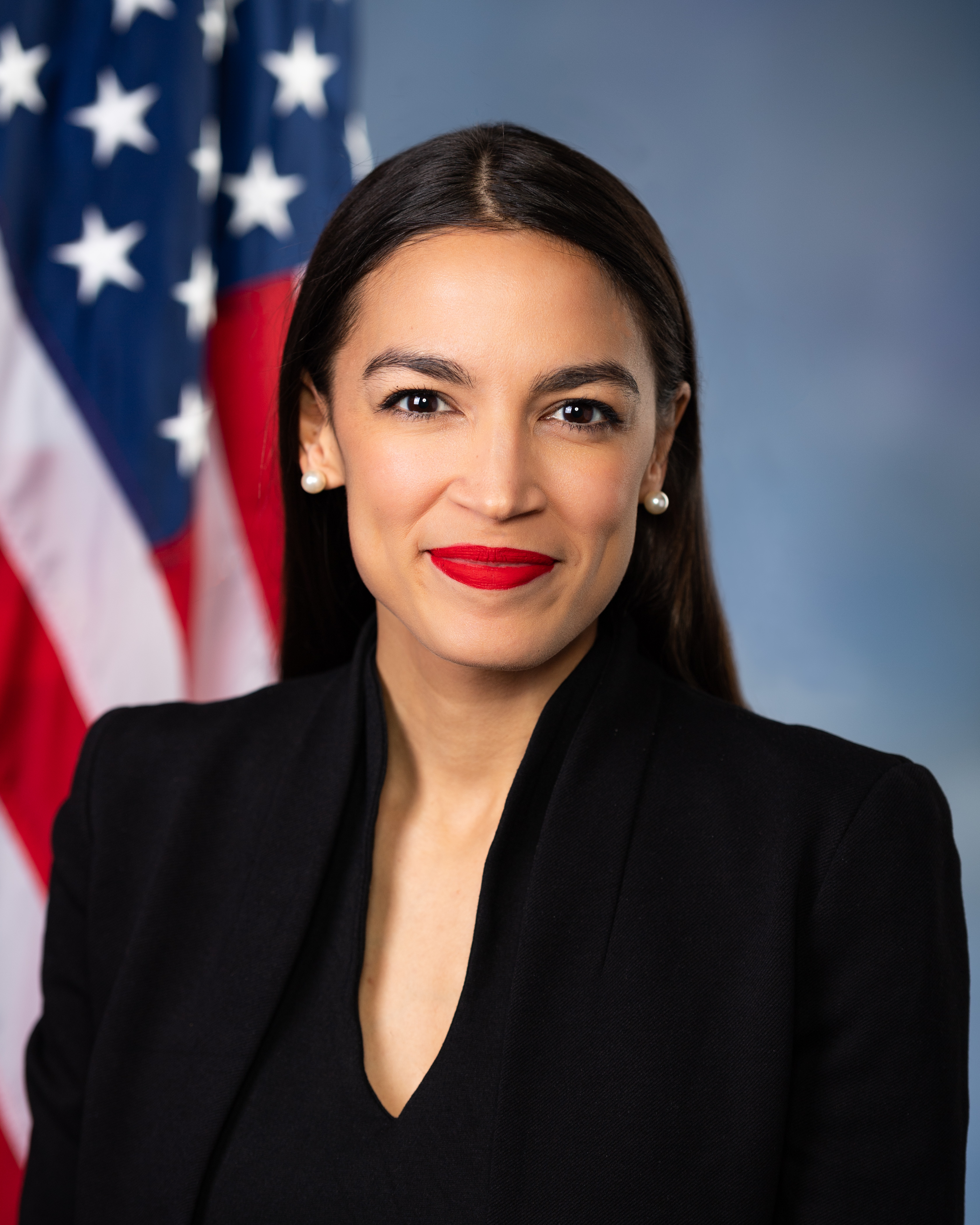
Alexandria Ocasio-Cortez

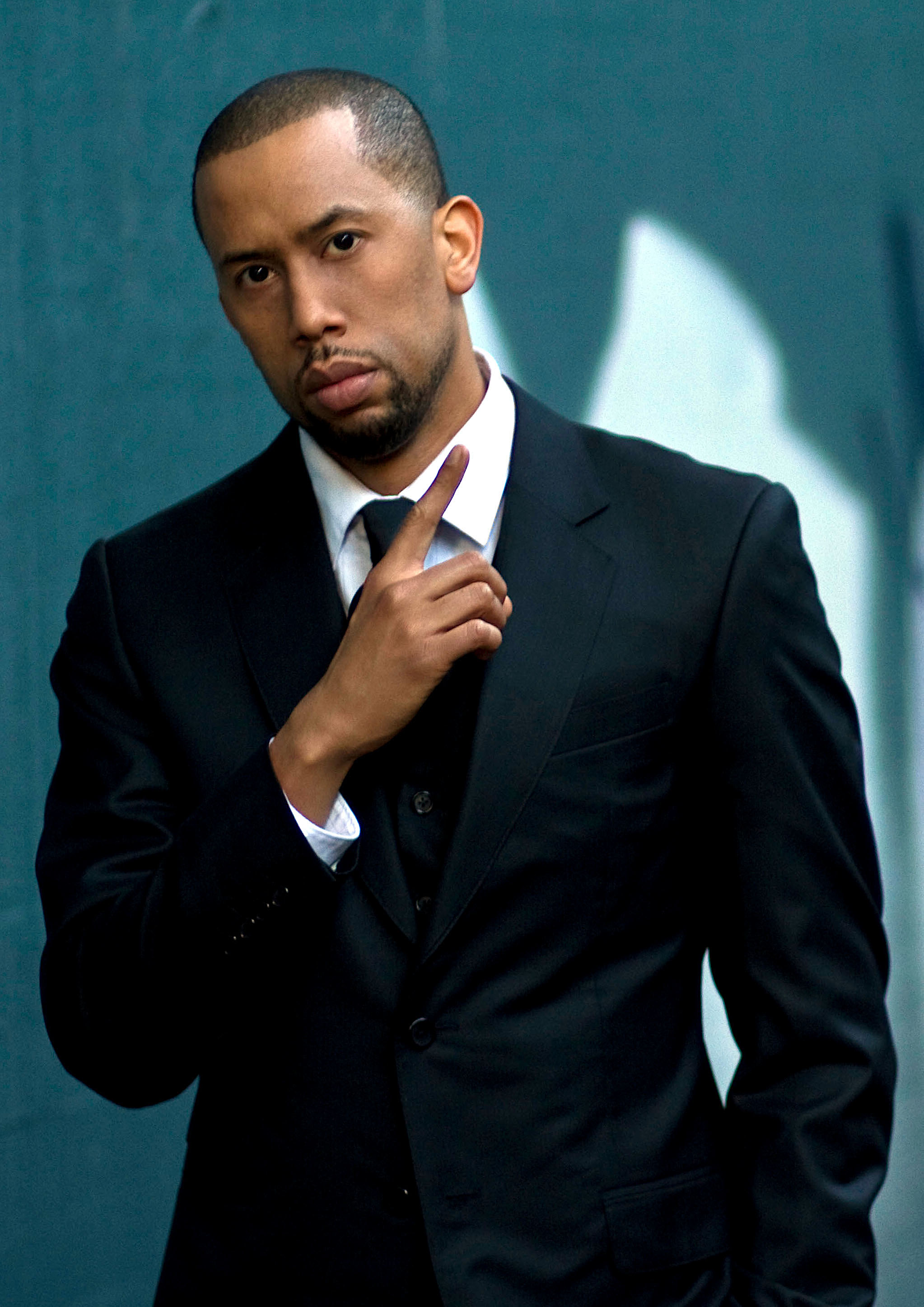
Affion Crockett

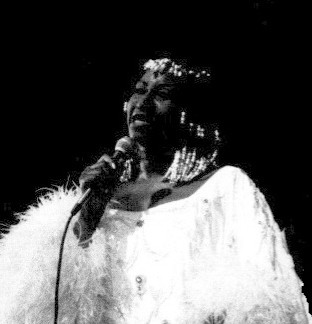
Celia Cruz

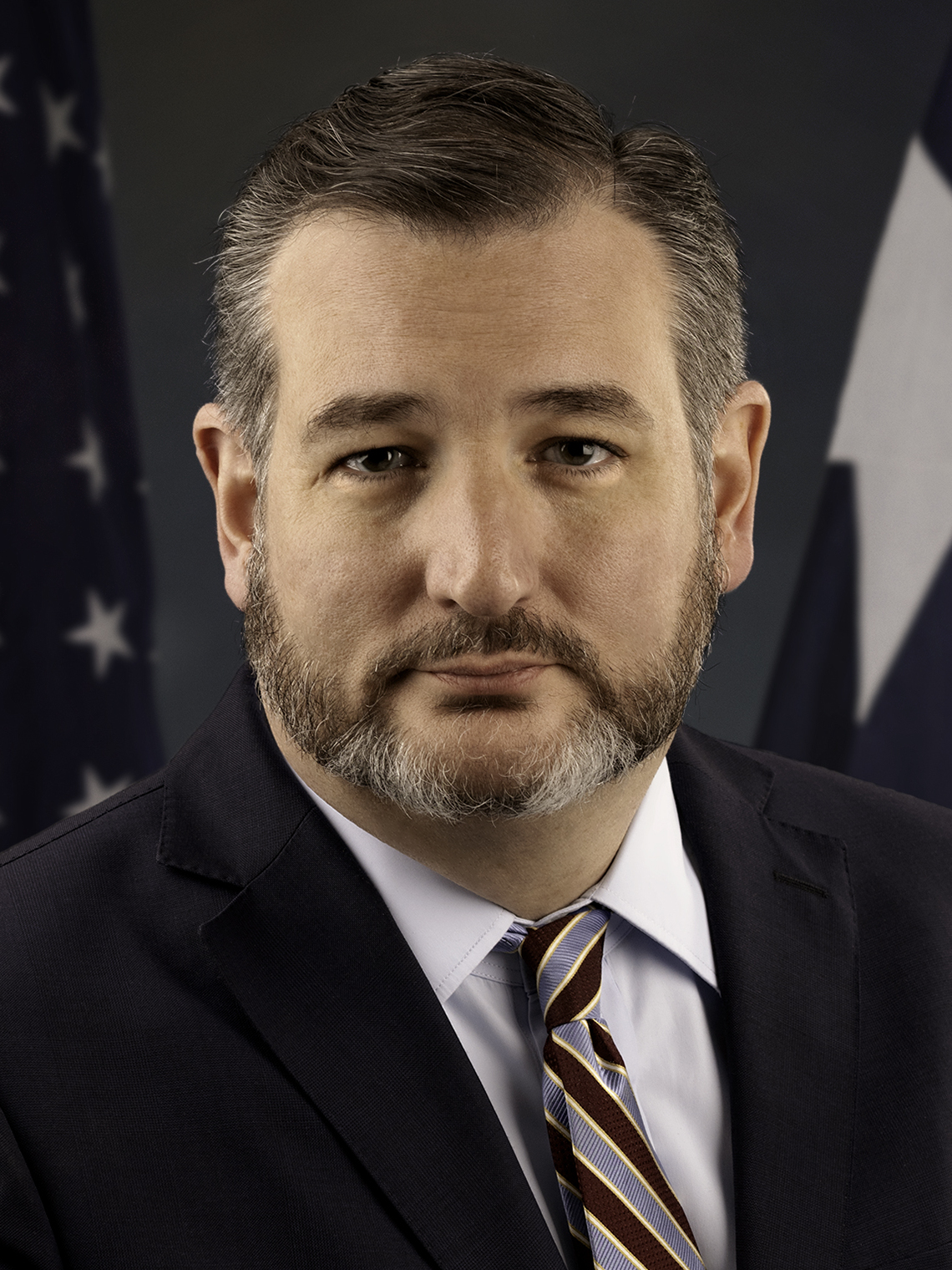
Ted Cruz

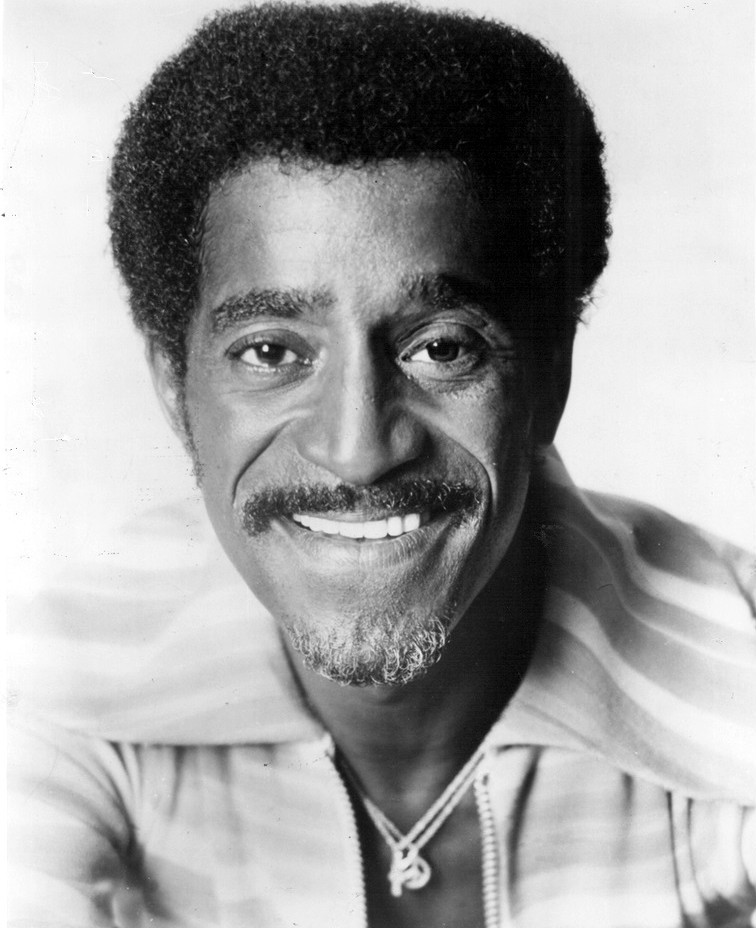
Sammy Davis Jr.

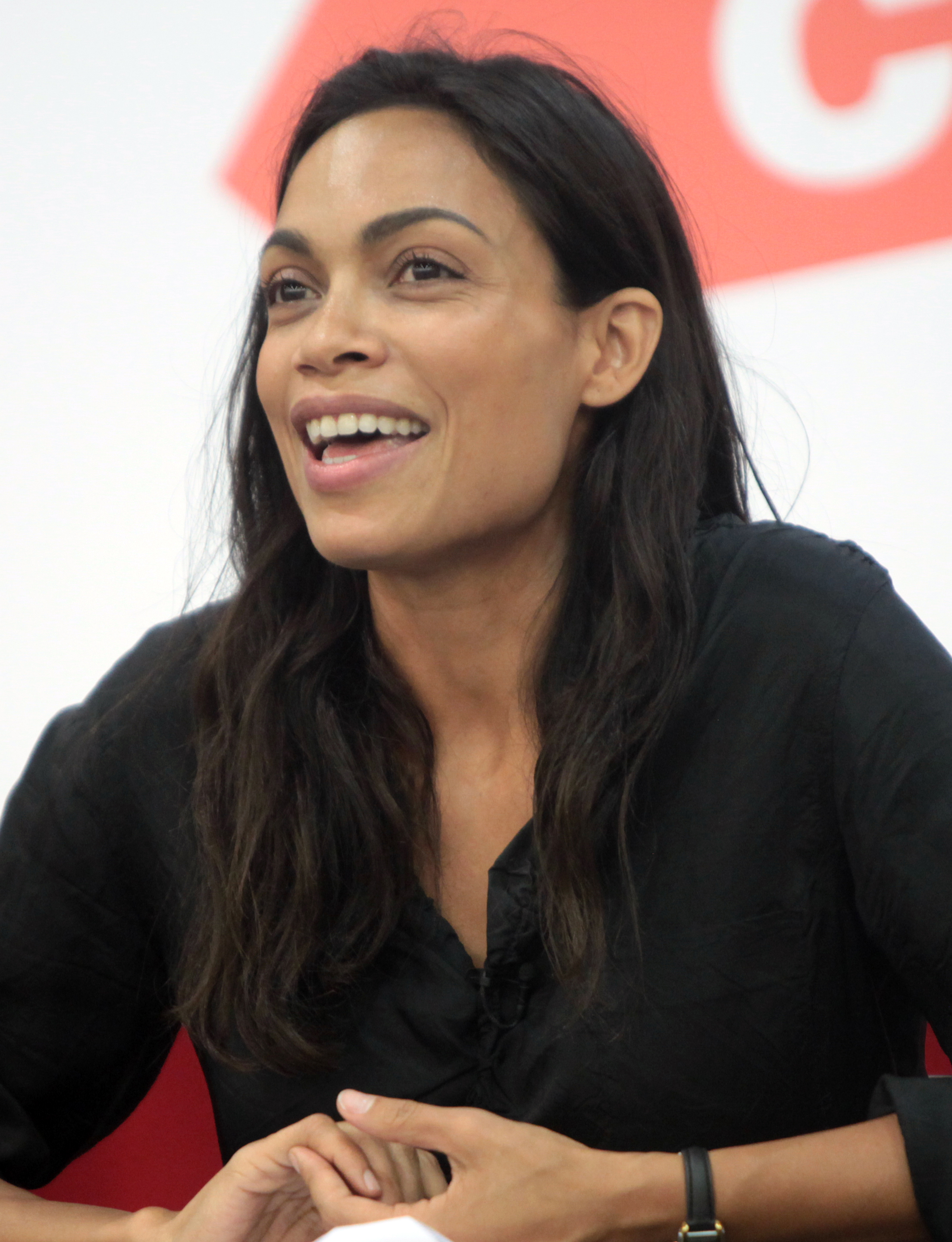
Rosario Dawson

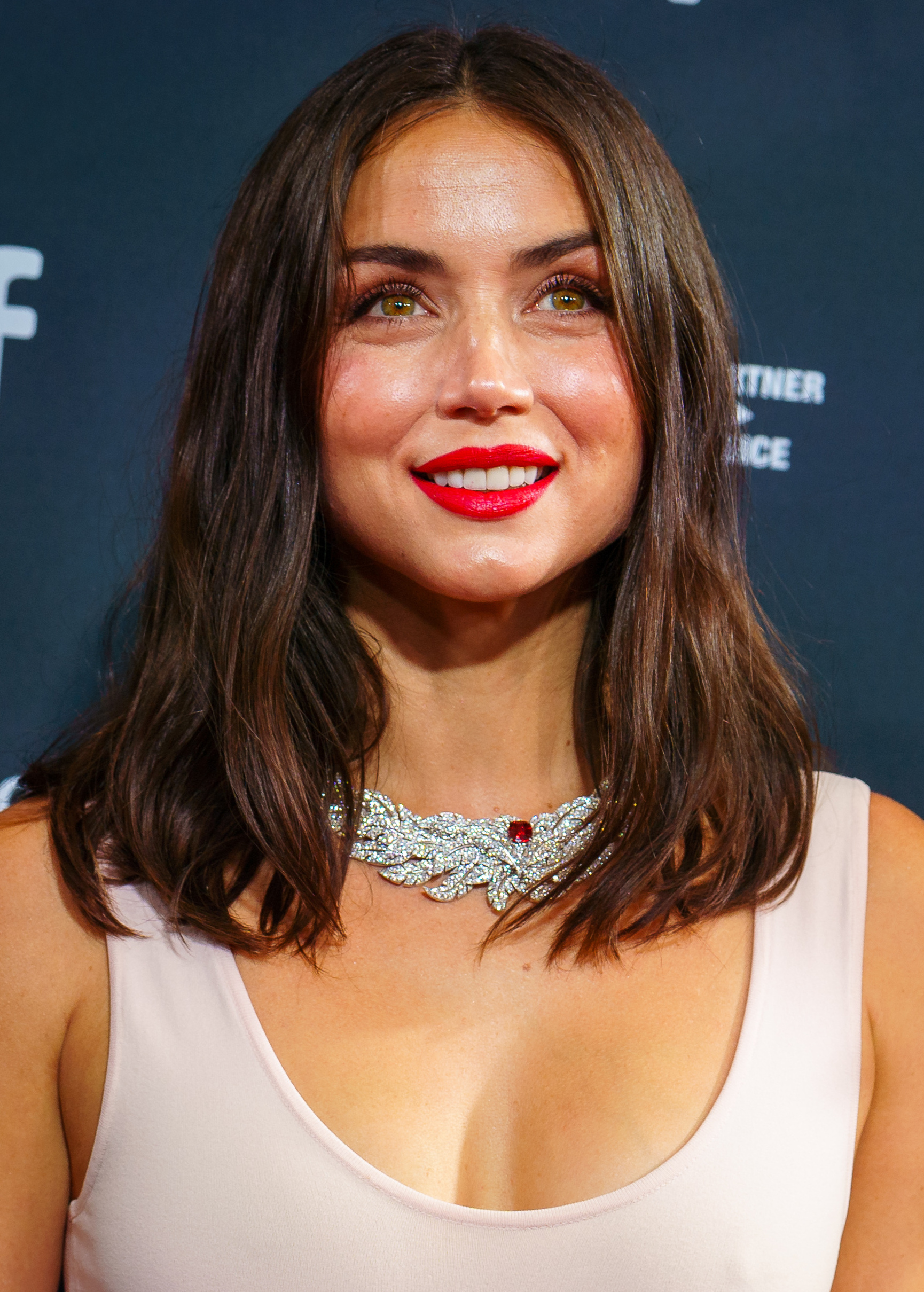
Ana de Armas

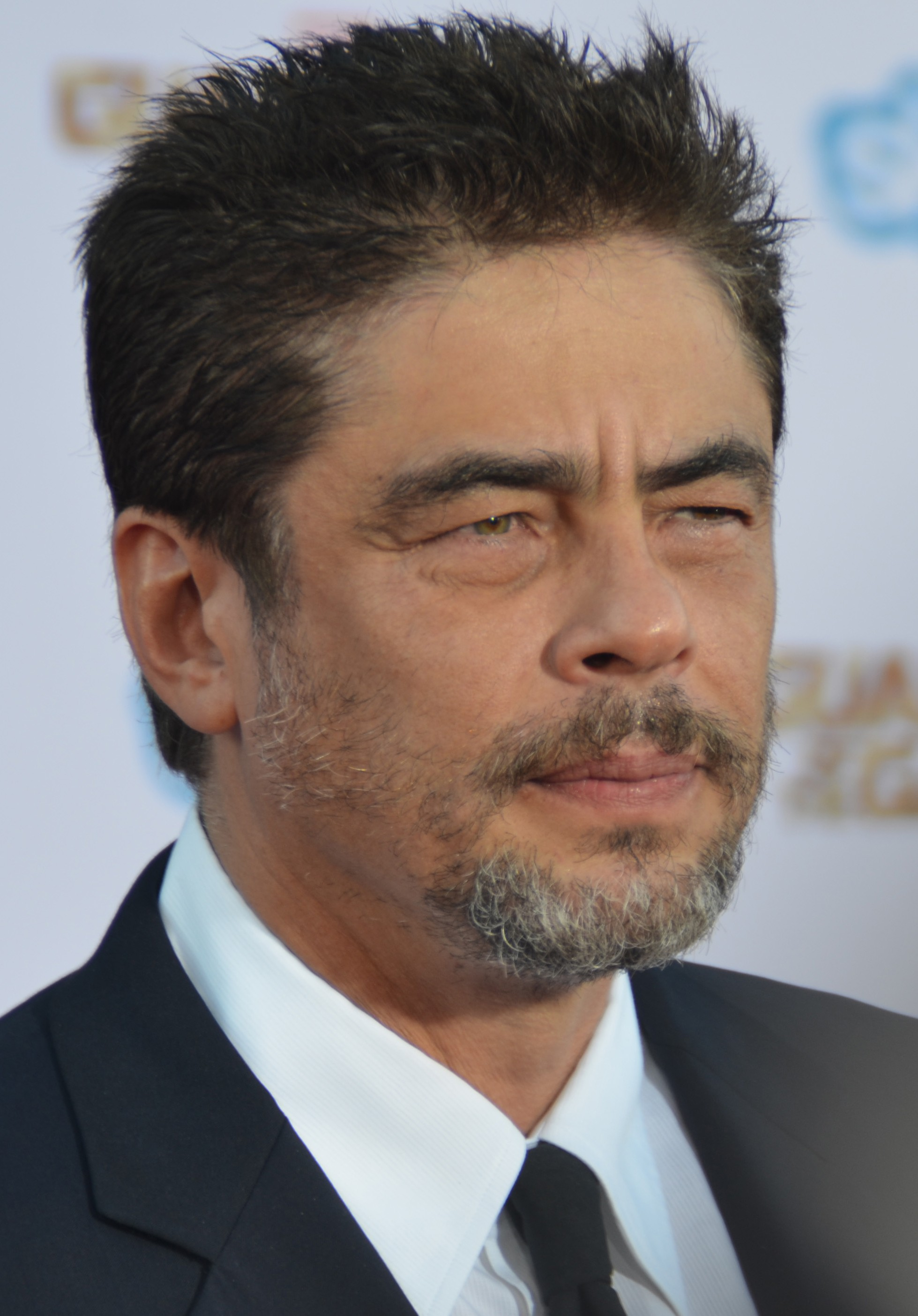
Benicio del Toro

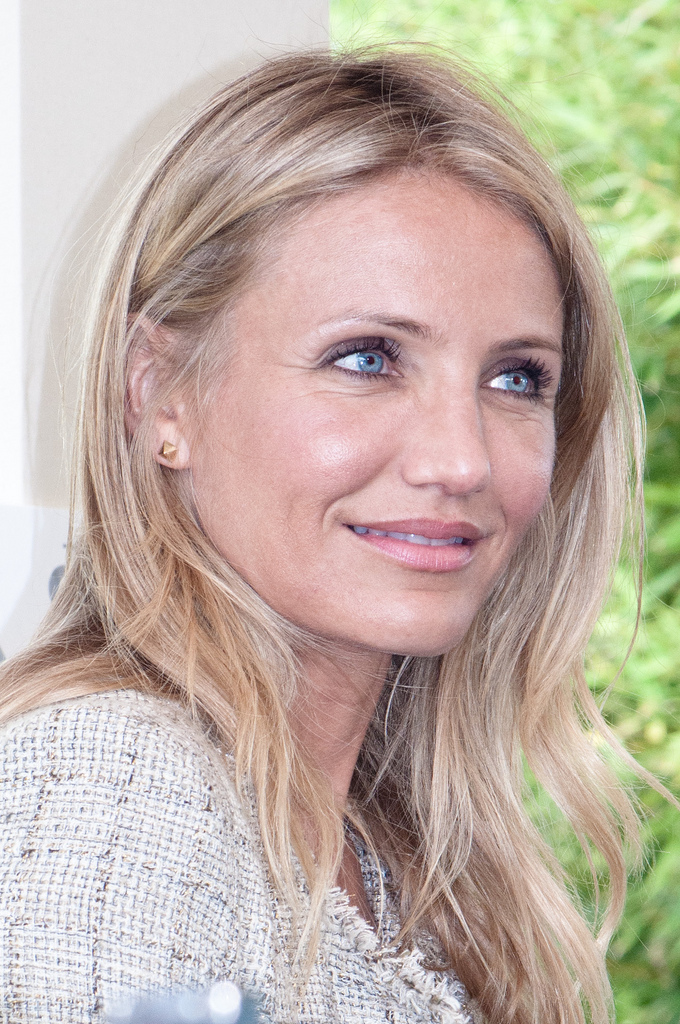
Cameron Diaz

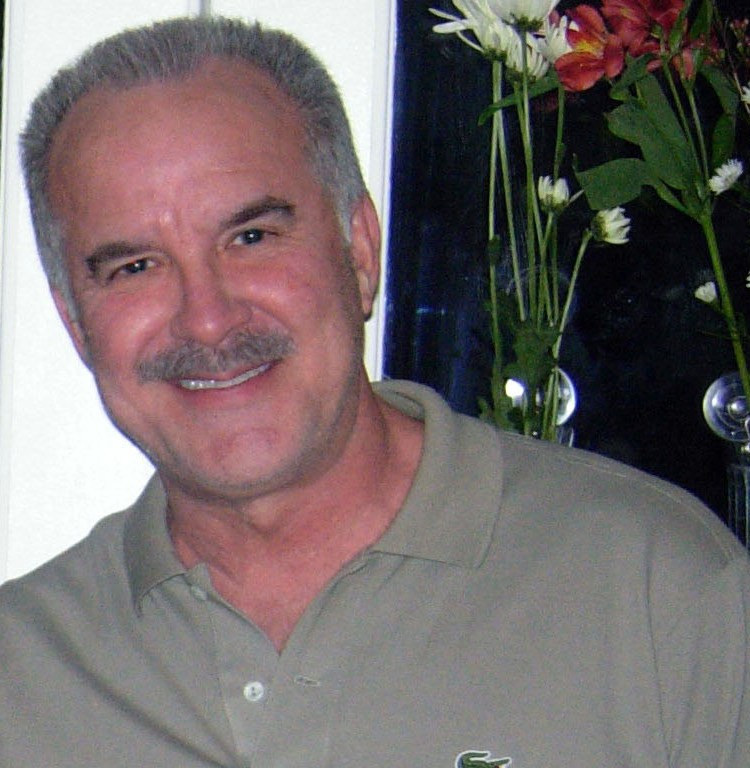
Emiliano Díez

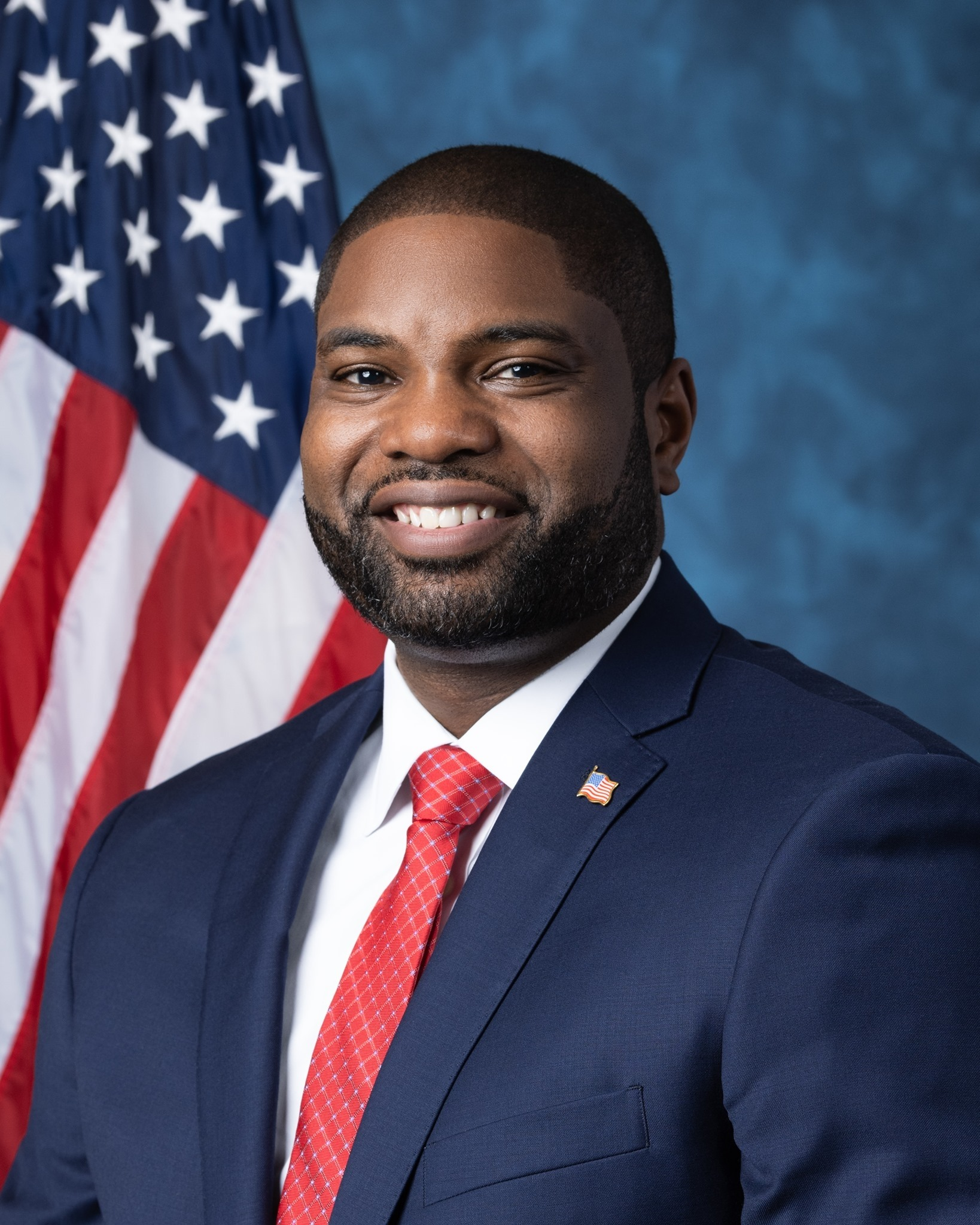
Byron Donalds

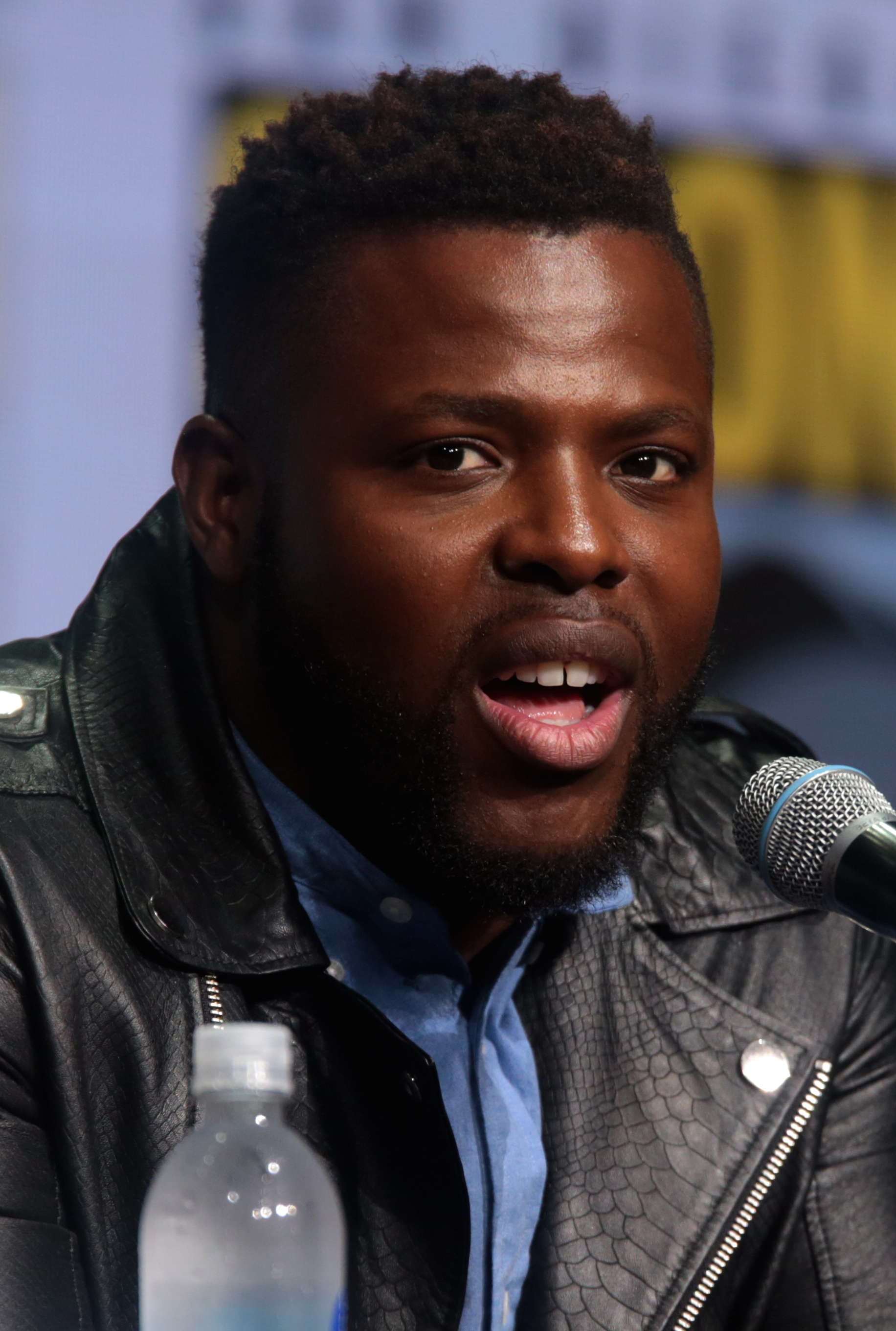
Winston Duke

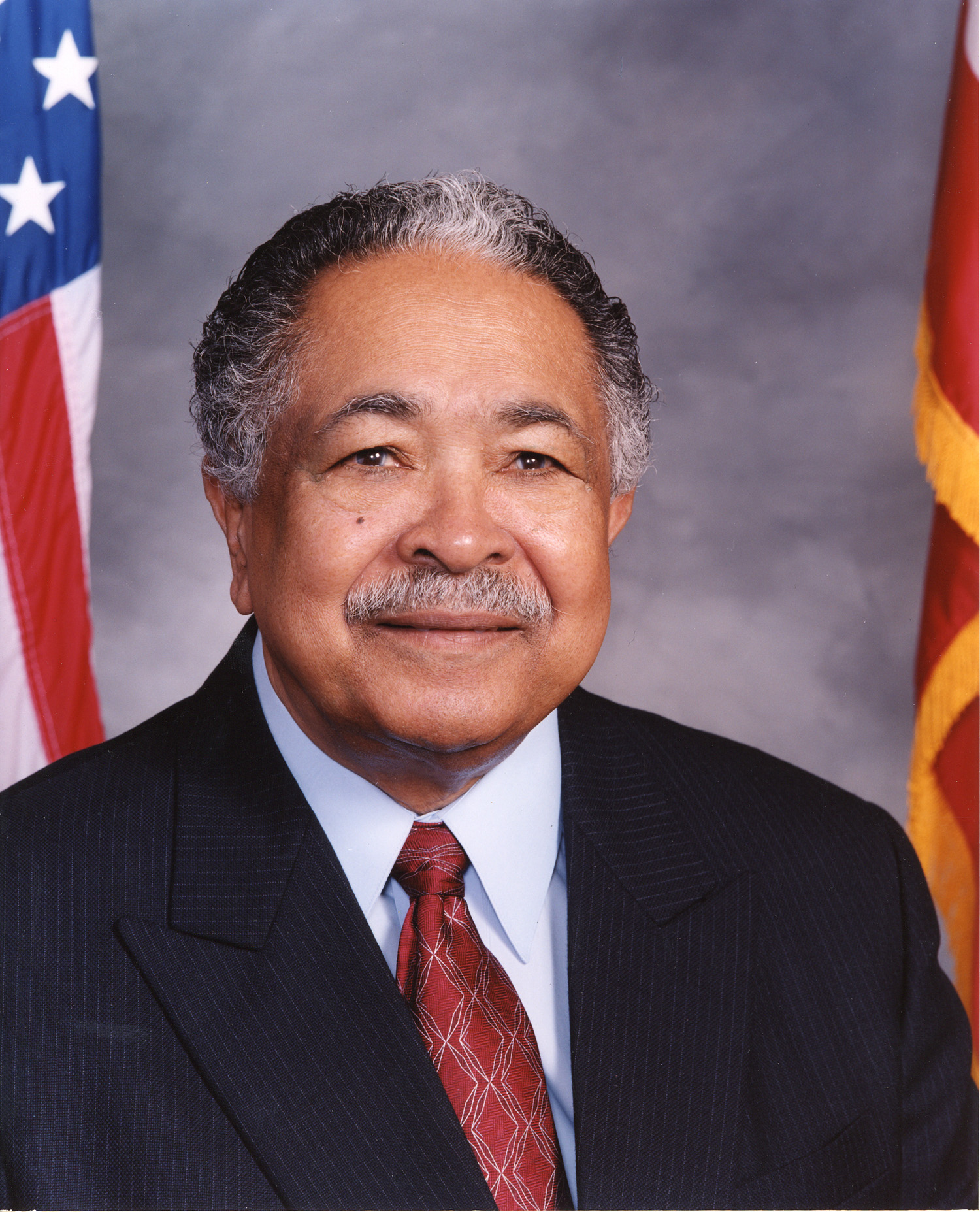
Mervyn Dymally

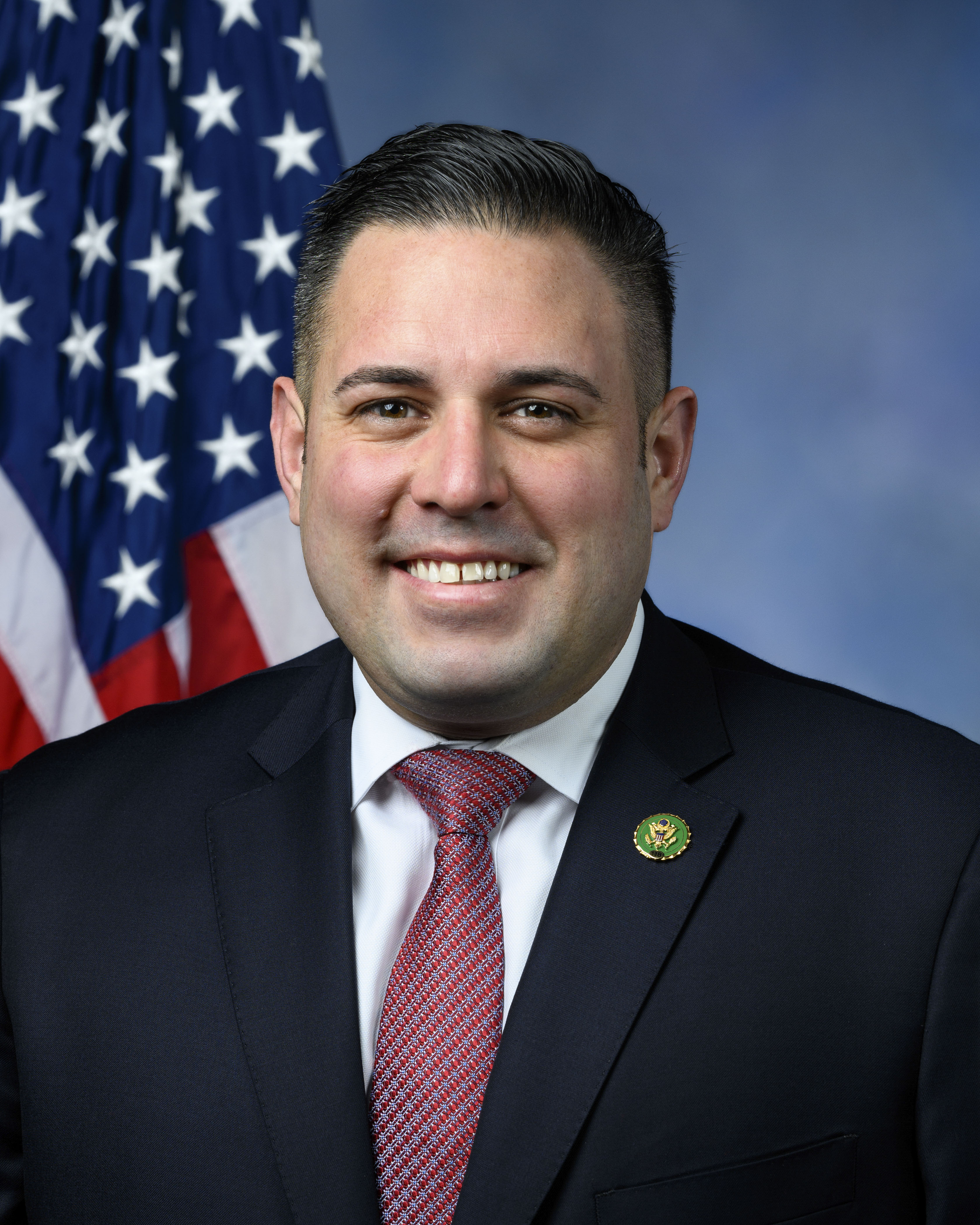
Anthony D'Esposito

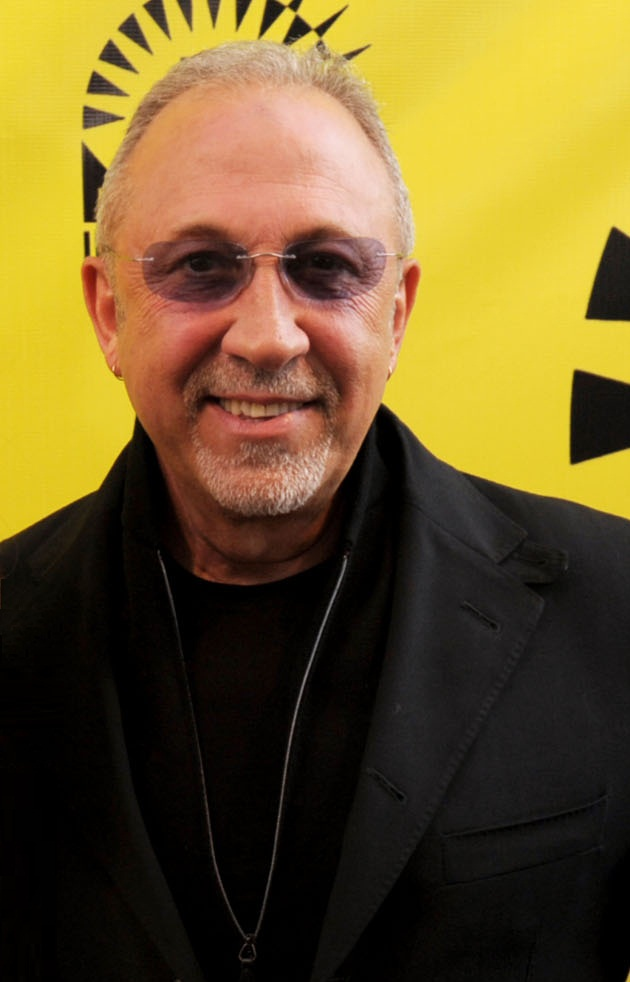
Emilio Estefan

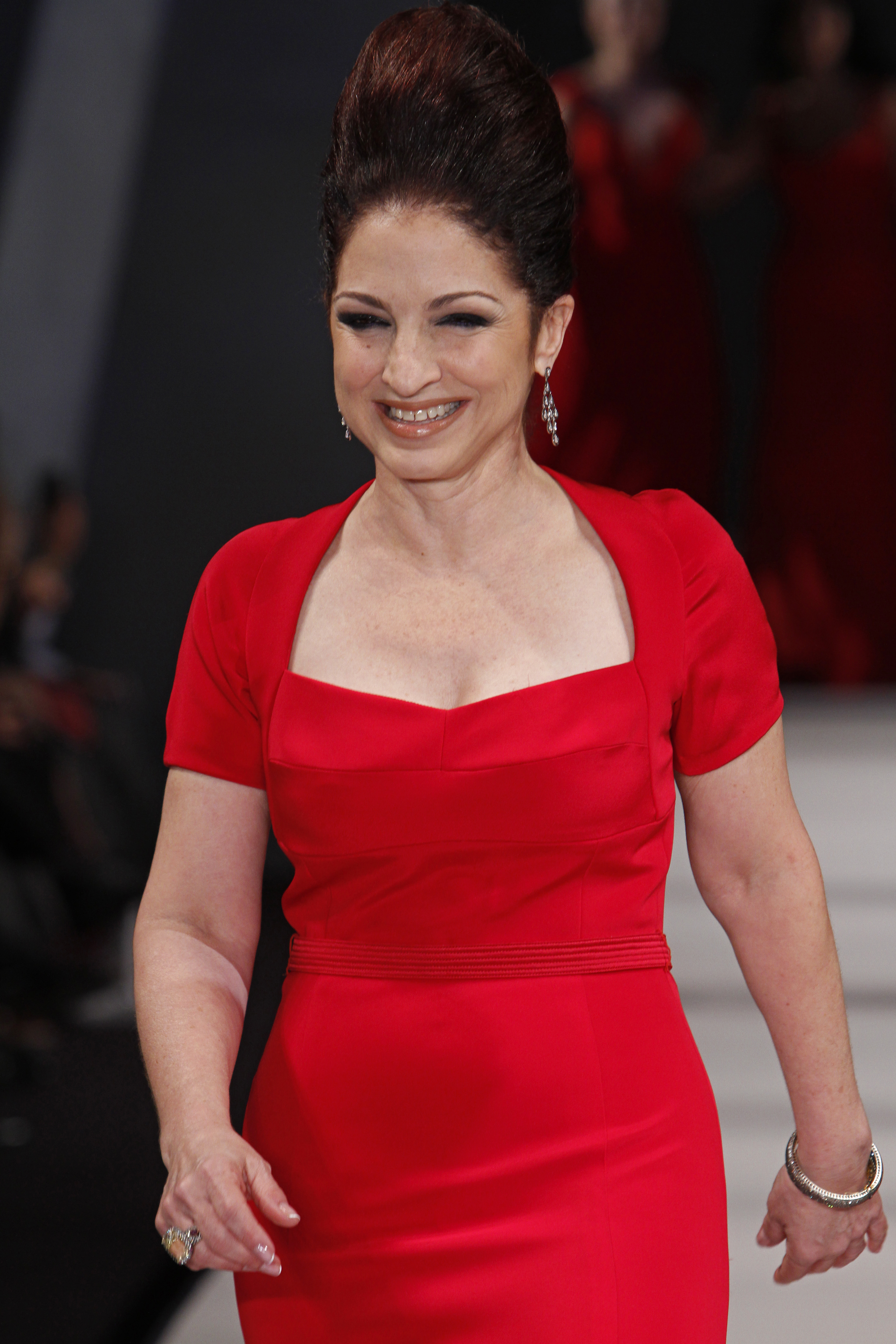
Gloria Estefan

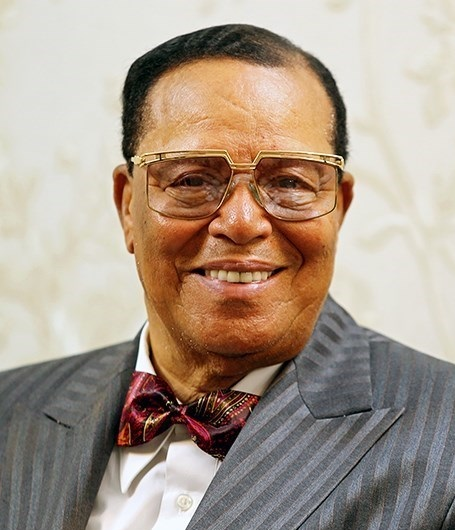
Louis Farrakhan

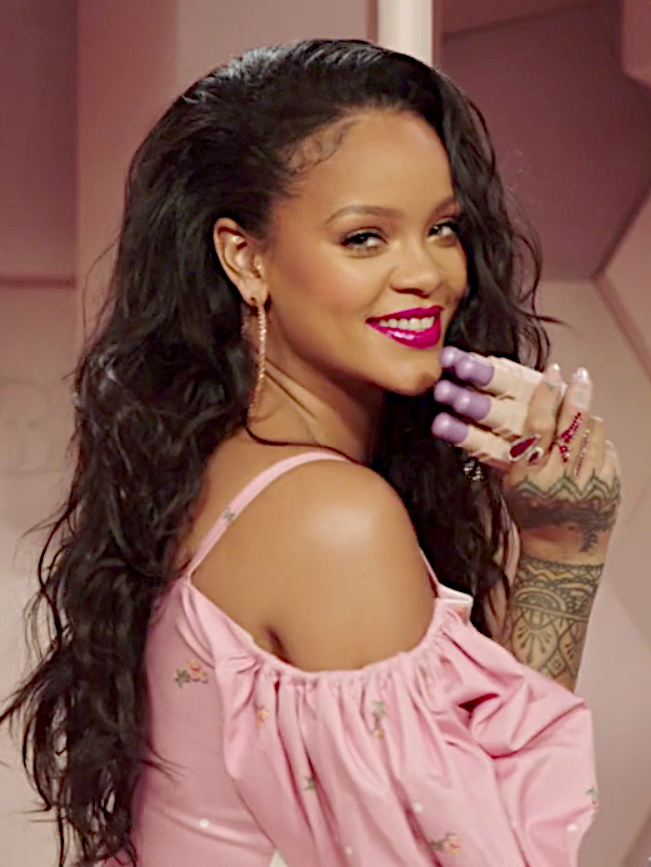
Rihanna Fenty

José Ferrer

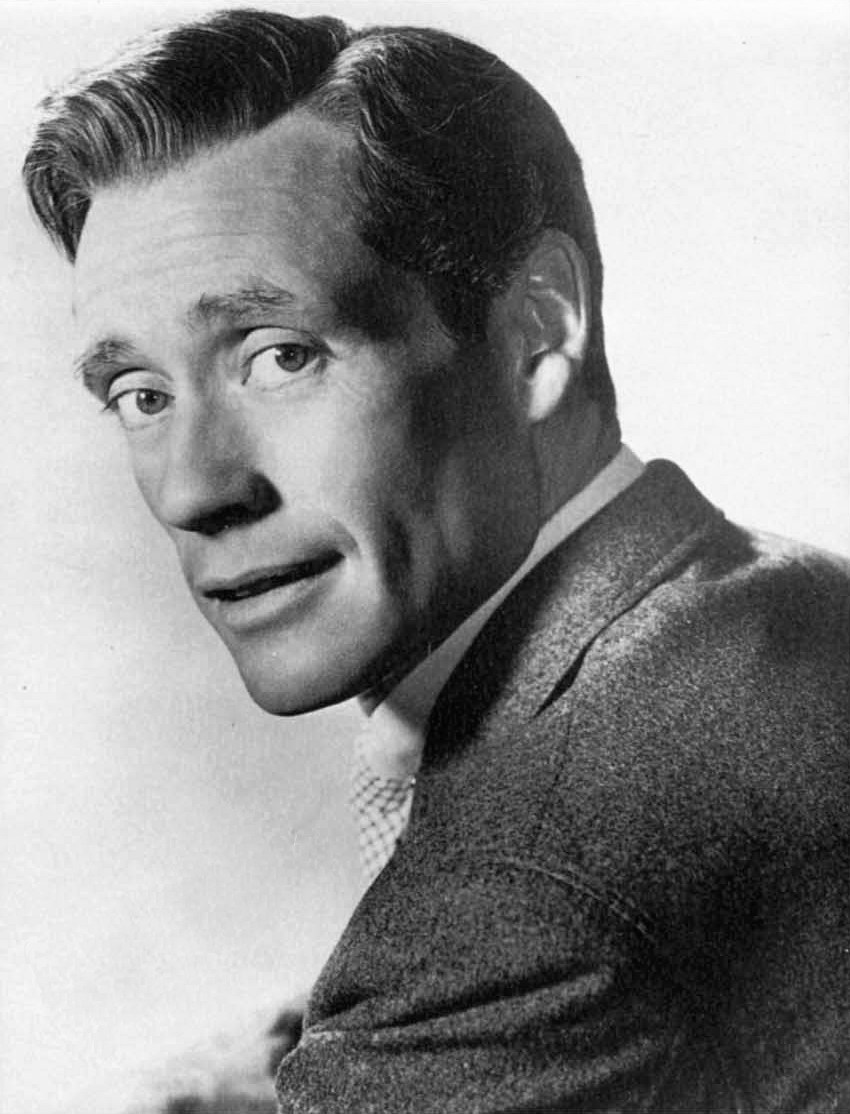
Mel Ferrer

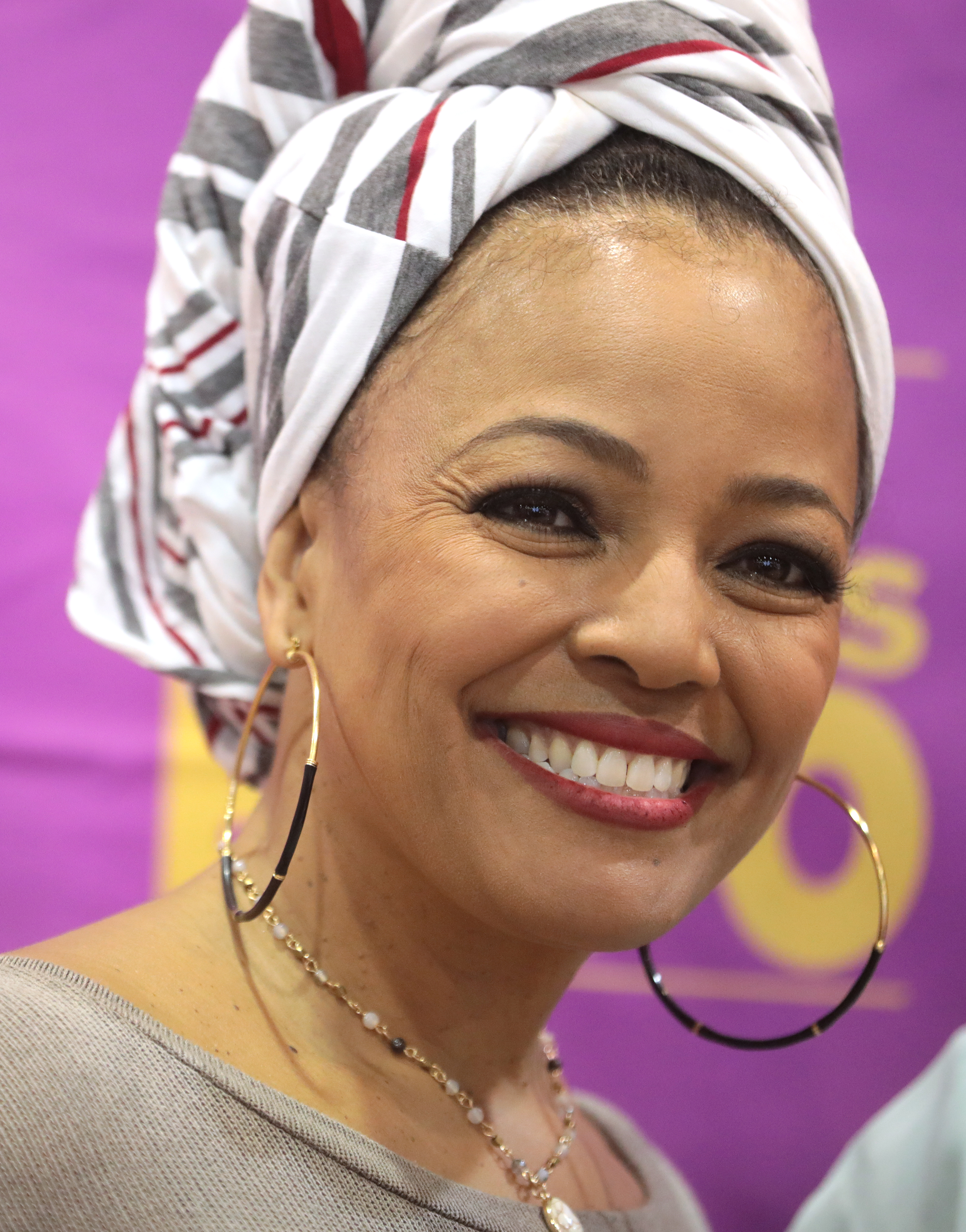
Kim Fields

Rhona Fox

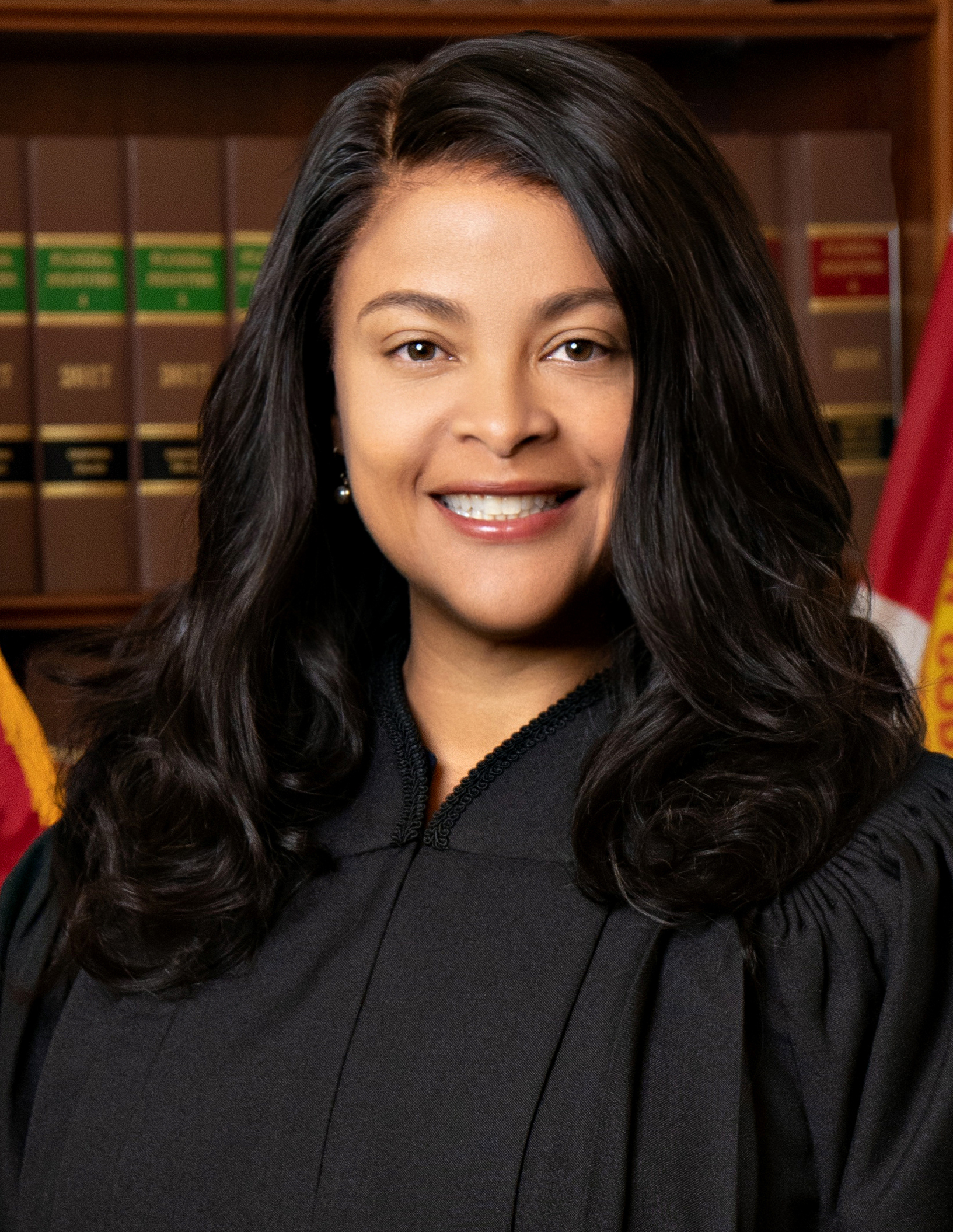
Renatha Francis

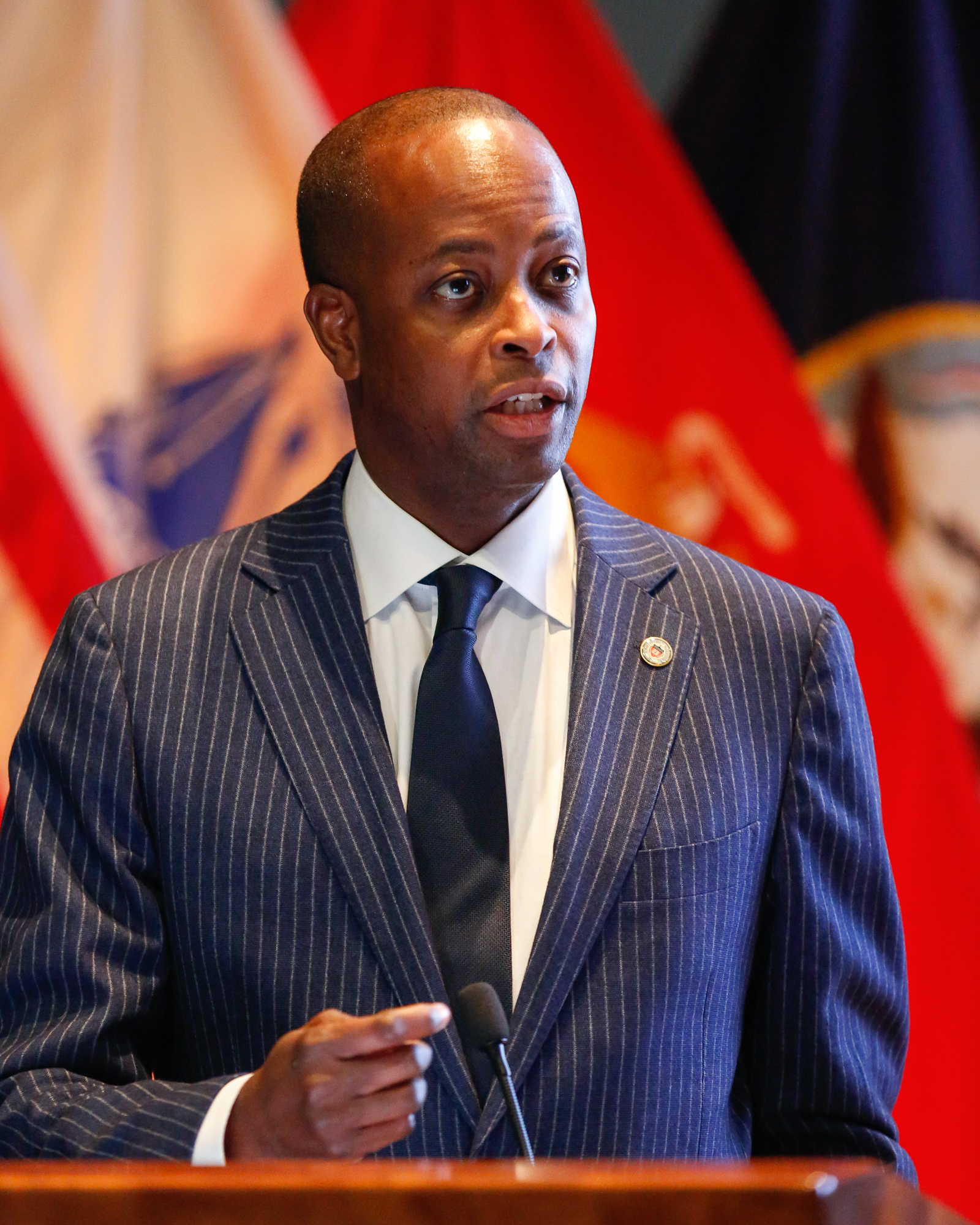
Wayne A. I. Frederick

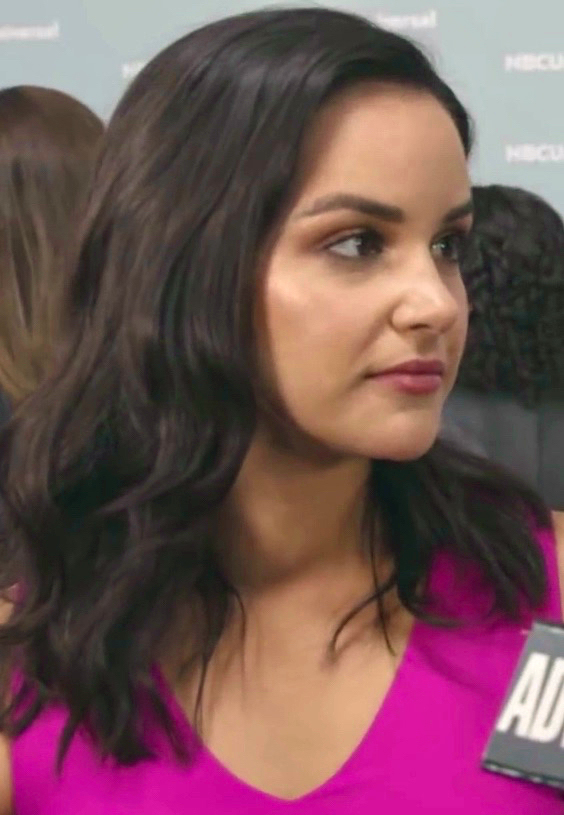
Melissa Fumero

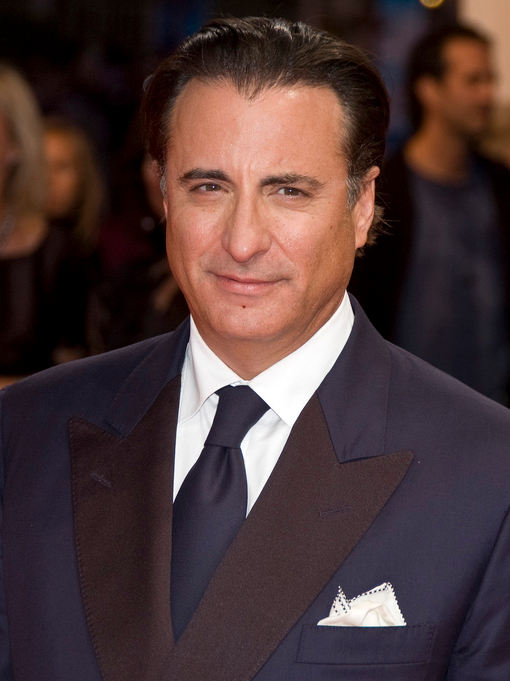
Andy García

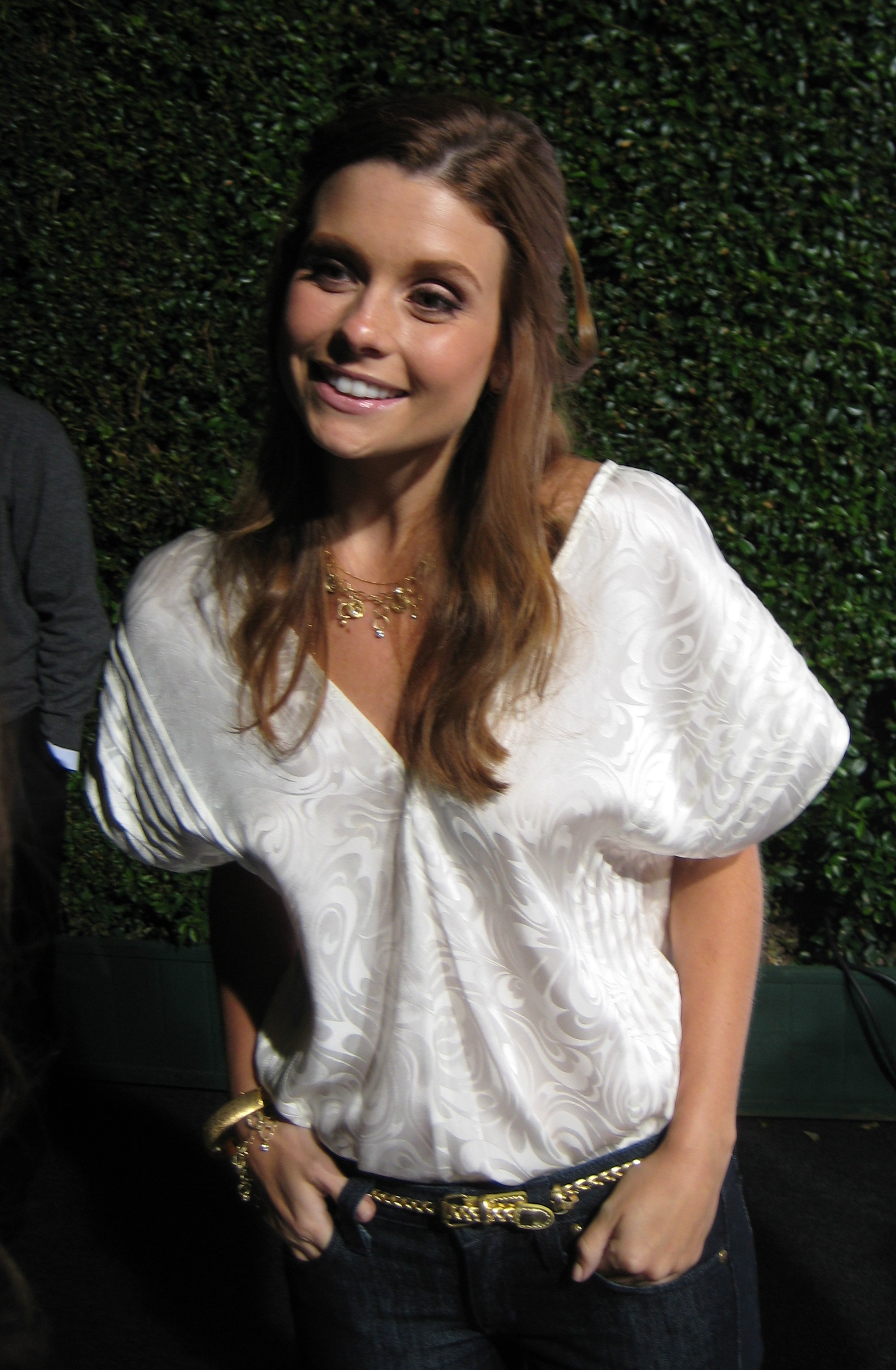
JoAnna Garcia

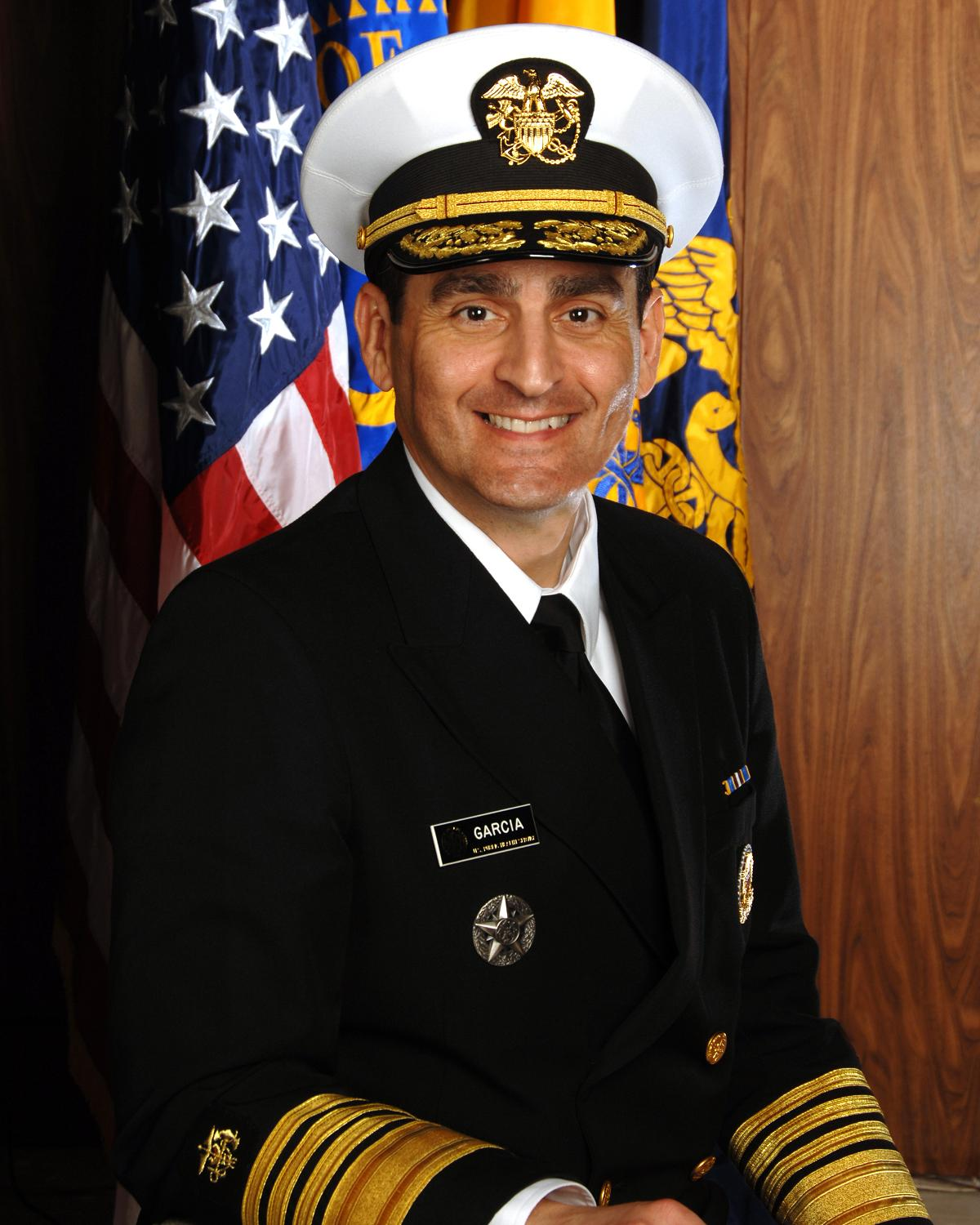
Joxel García

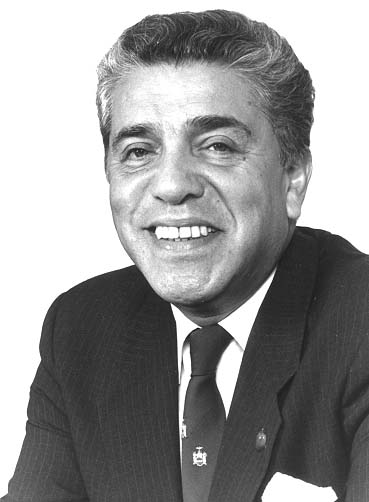
Robert Garcia

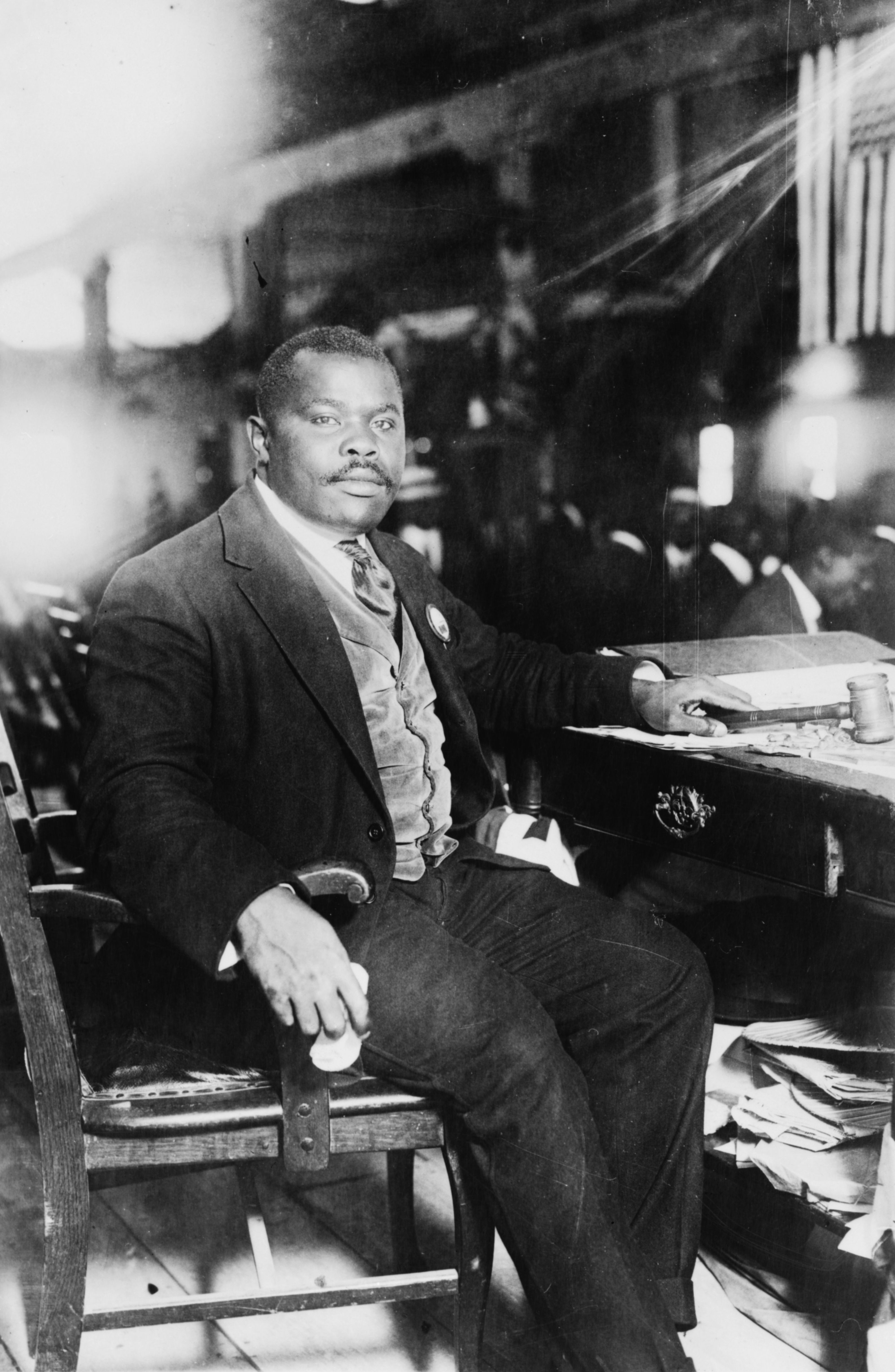
Marcus Garvey

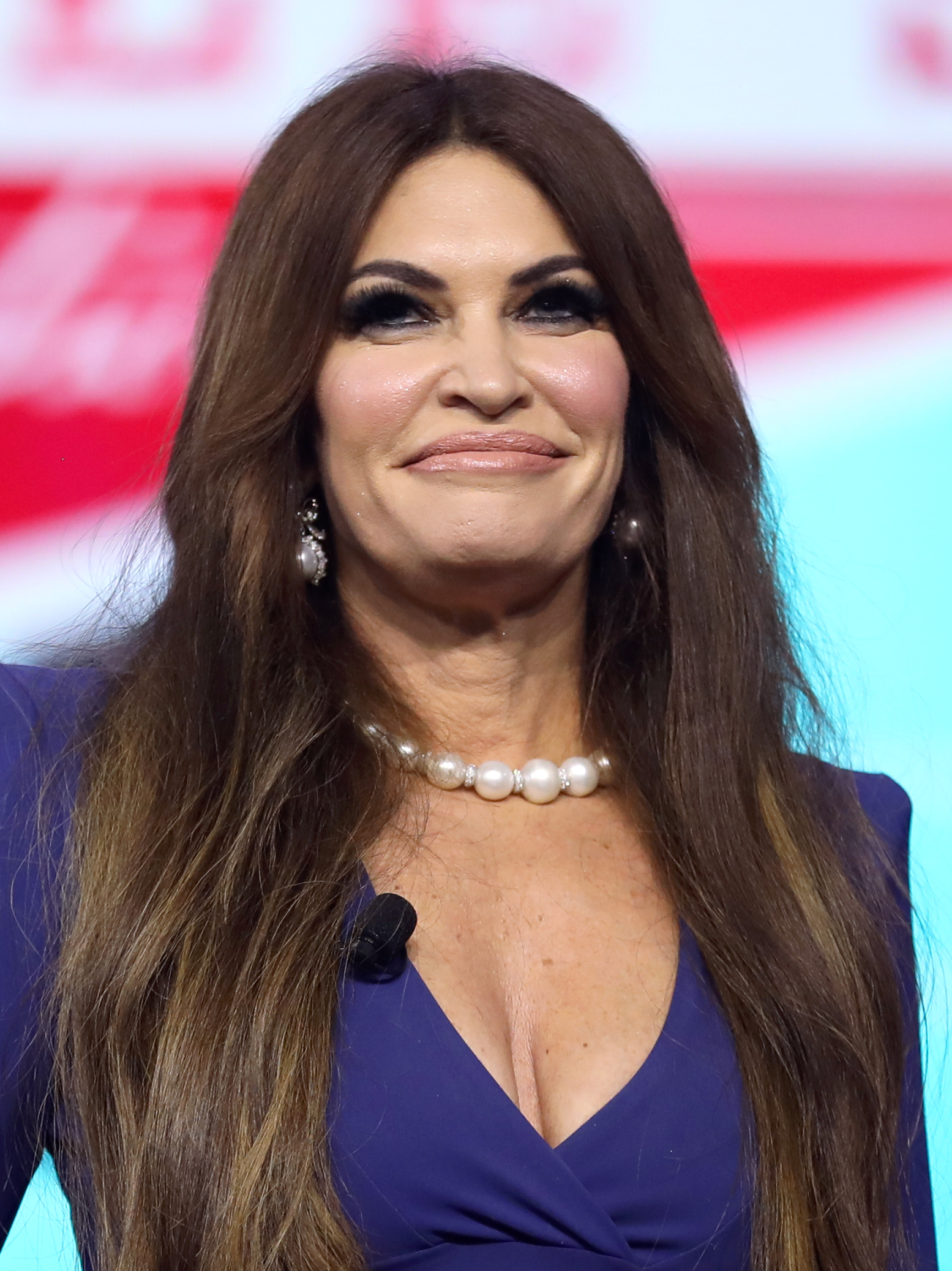
Kimberly Guilfoyle

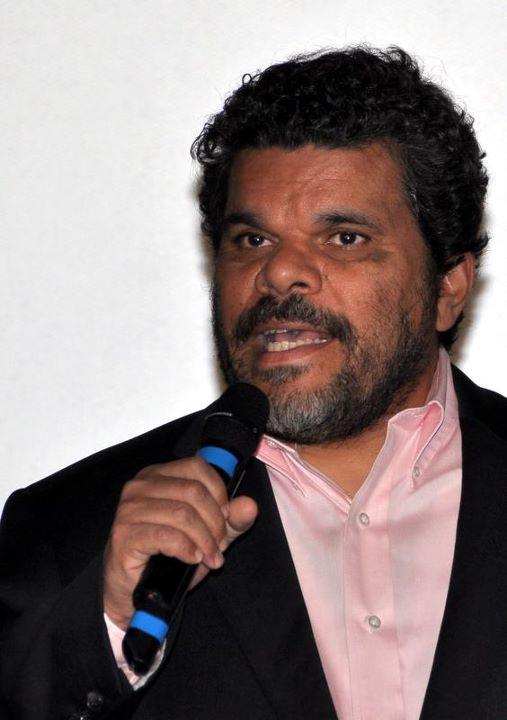
Luis Guzmán

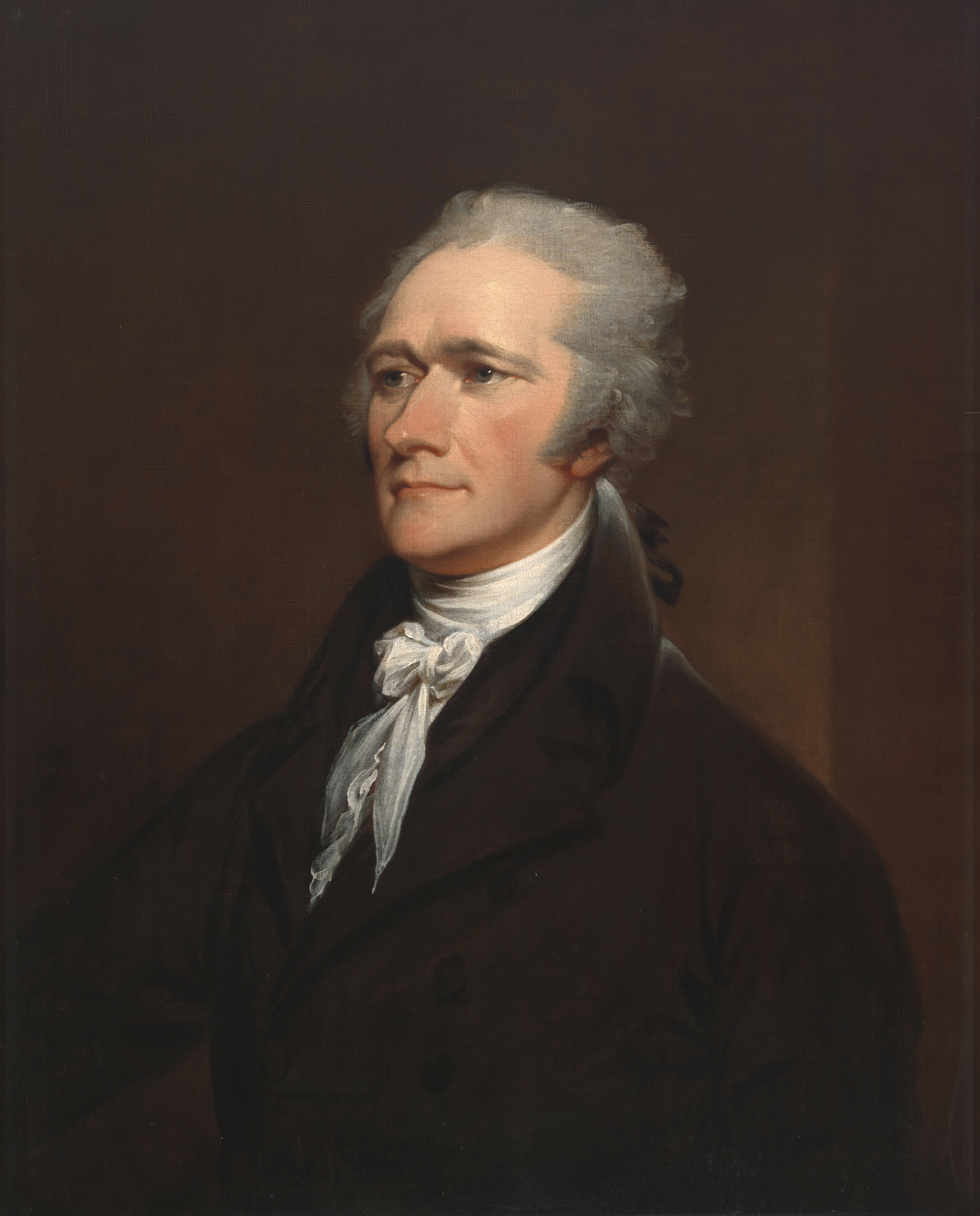
Alexander Hamilton

Kamala Harris

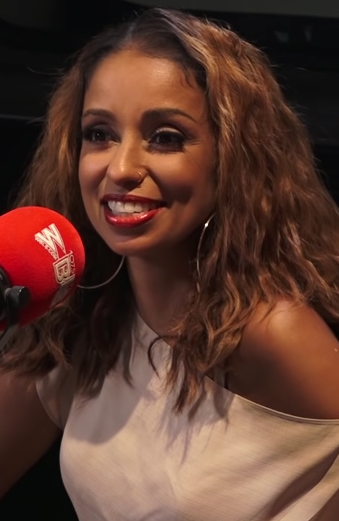
Mýa Harrison

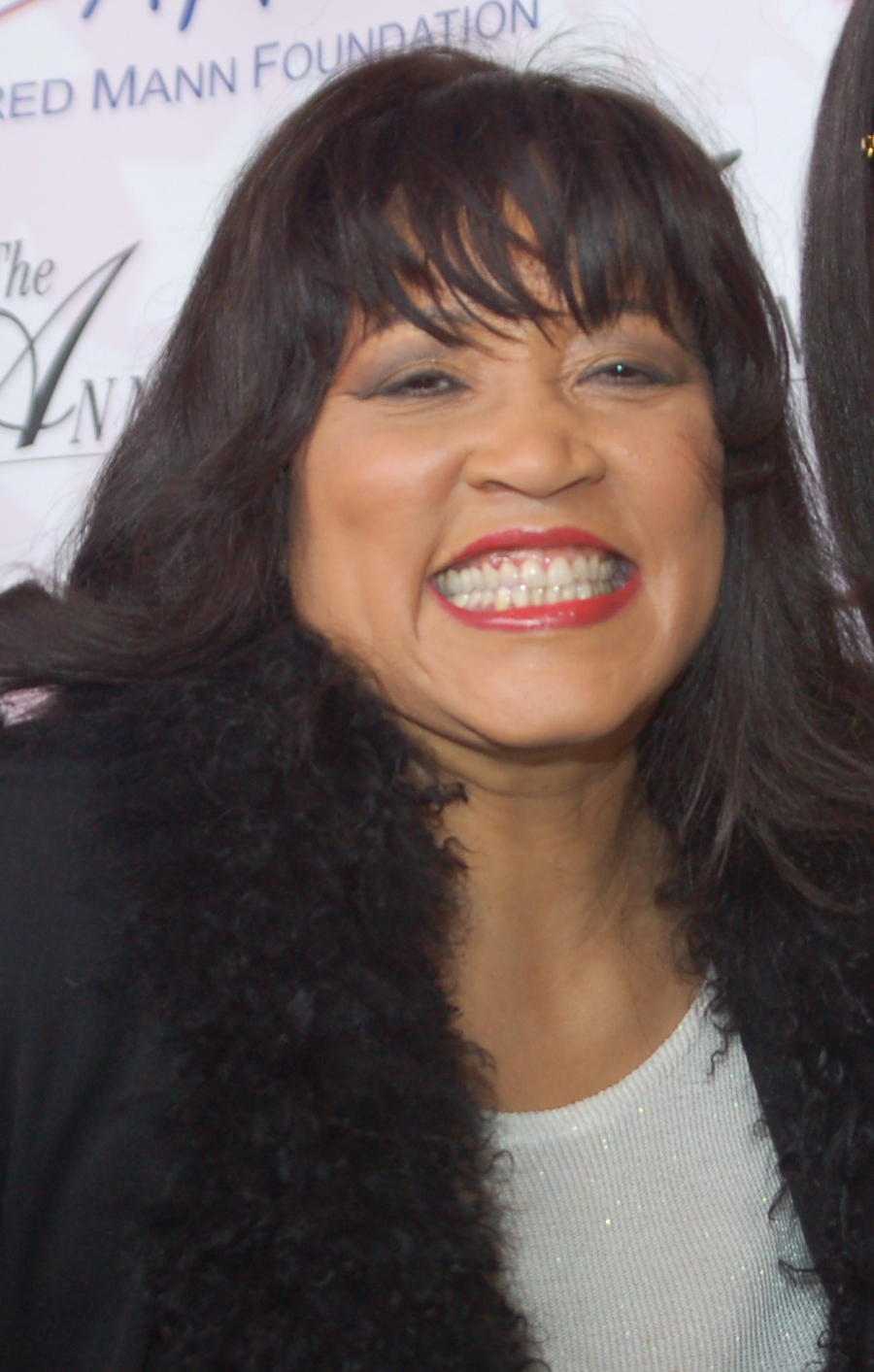
Jackée Harry

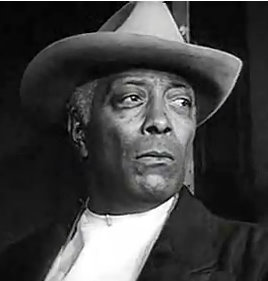
Juano Hernandez

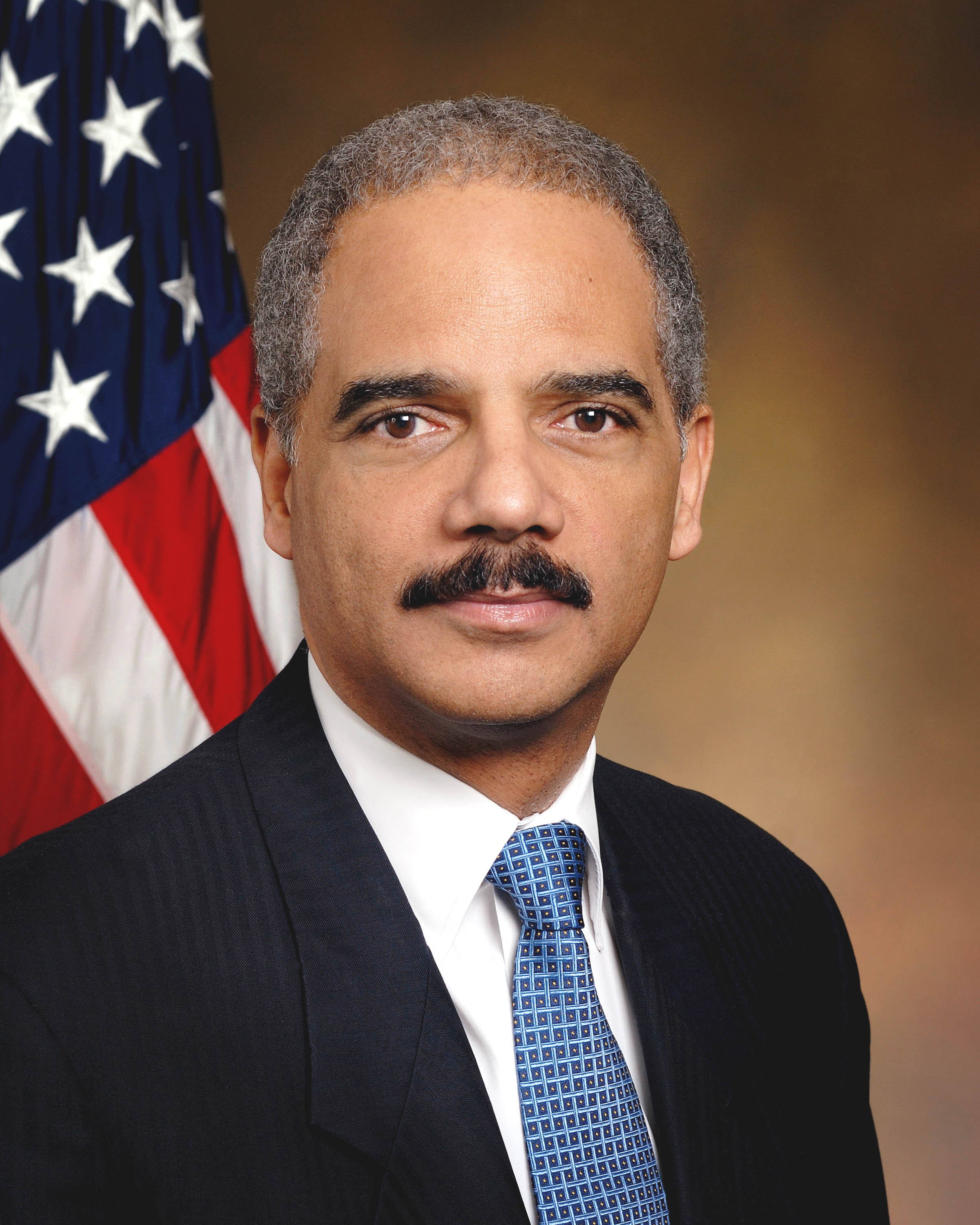
Eric Holder

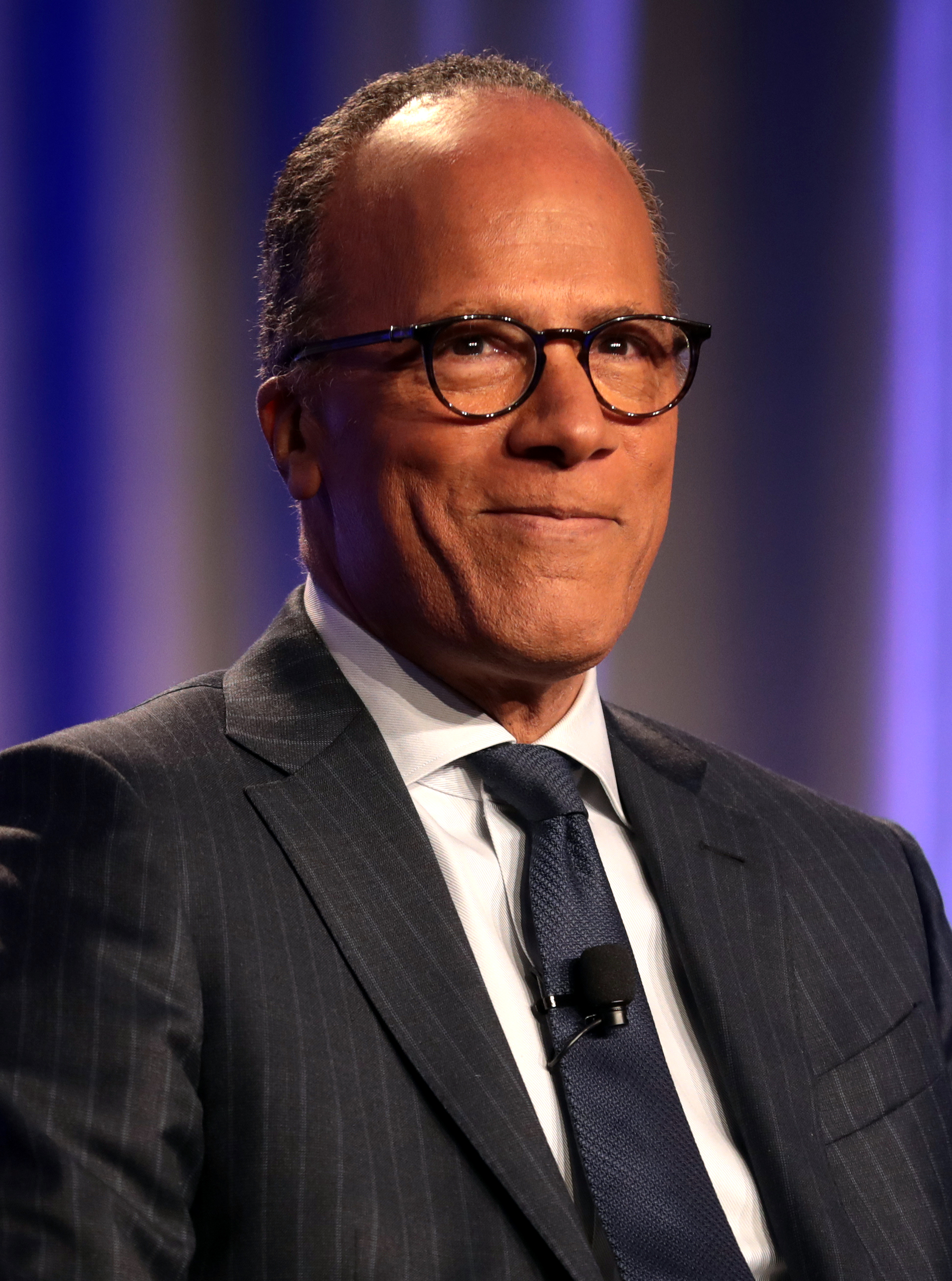
Lester Holt

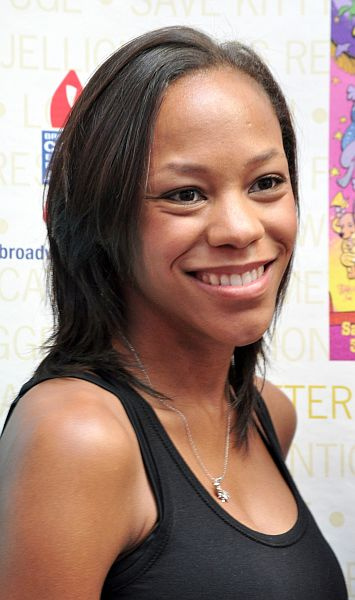
Nikki M. James

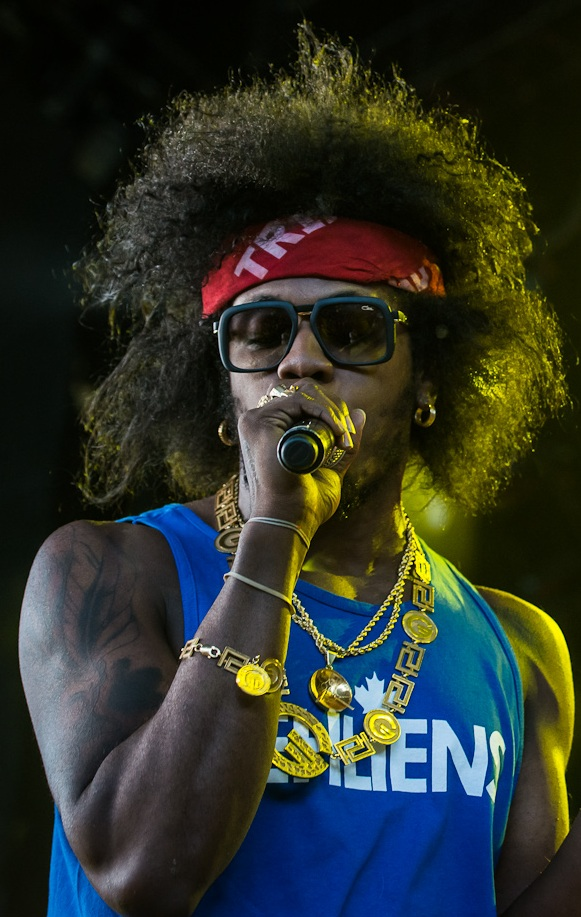
Trinidad James

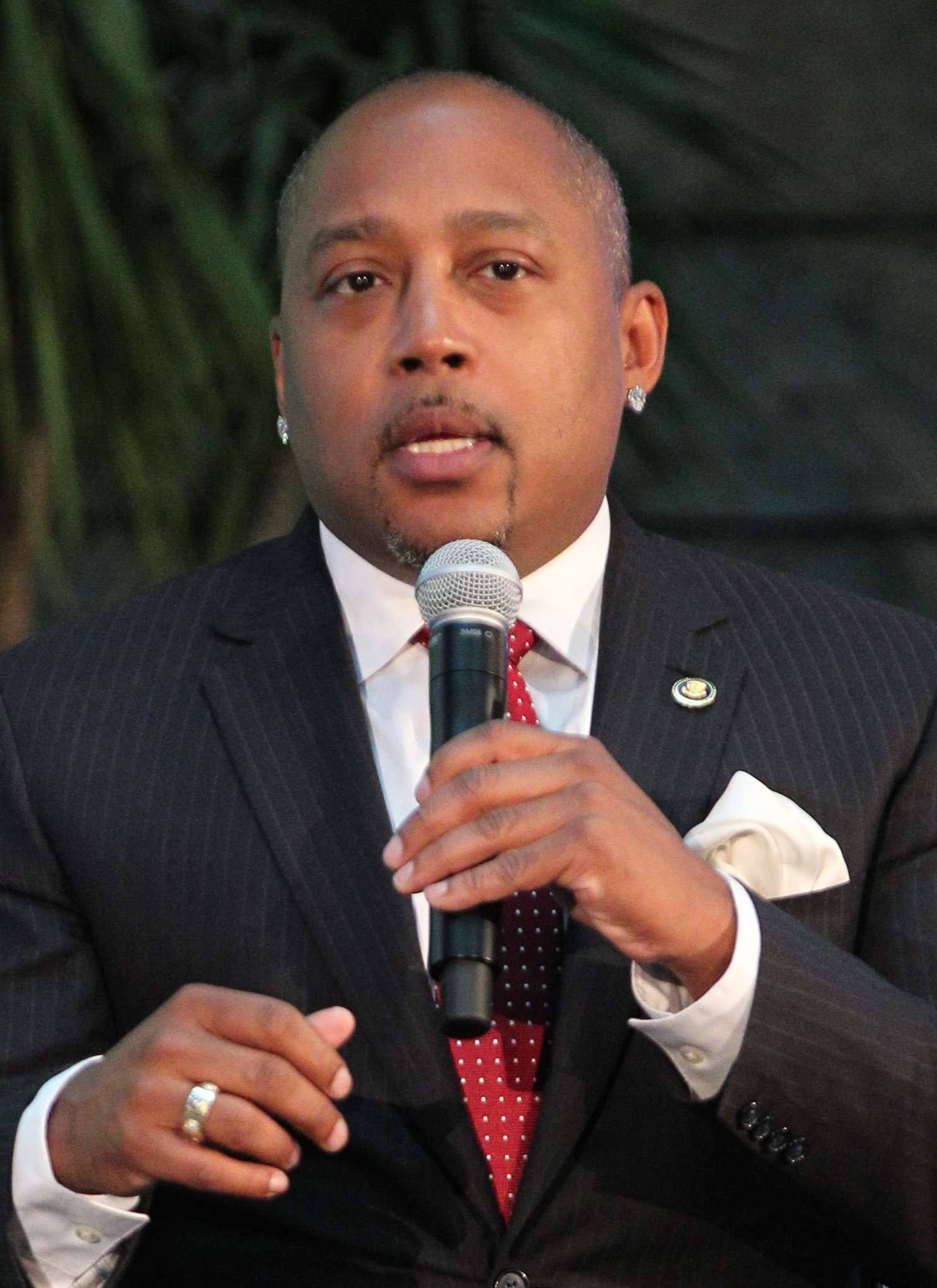
Daymond John

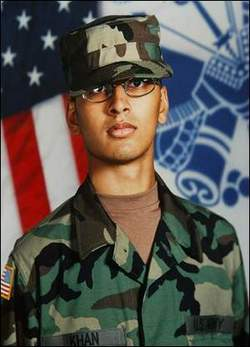
Kareem Rashad Sultan Khan

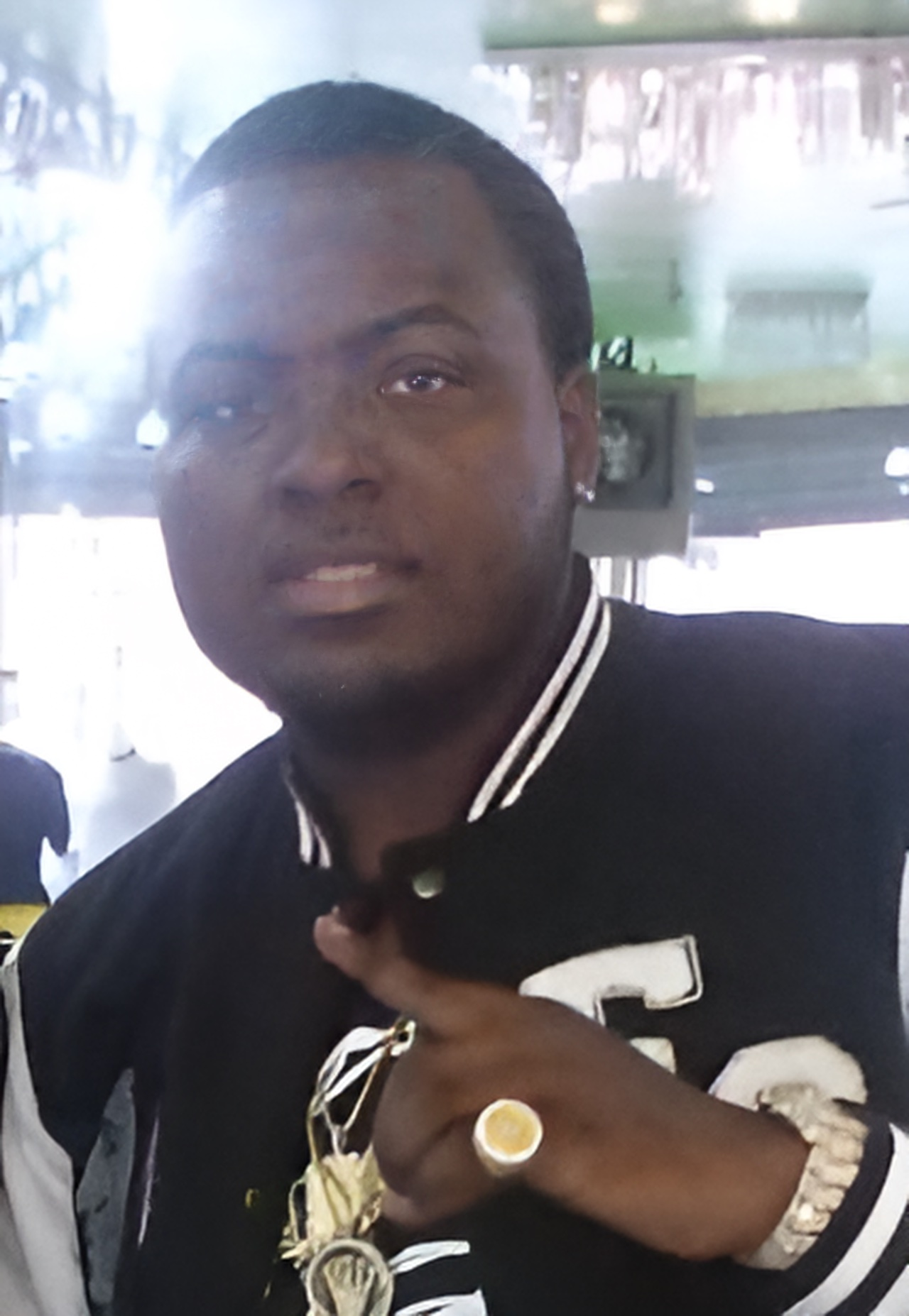
Sean Kingston

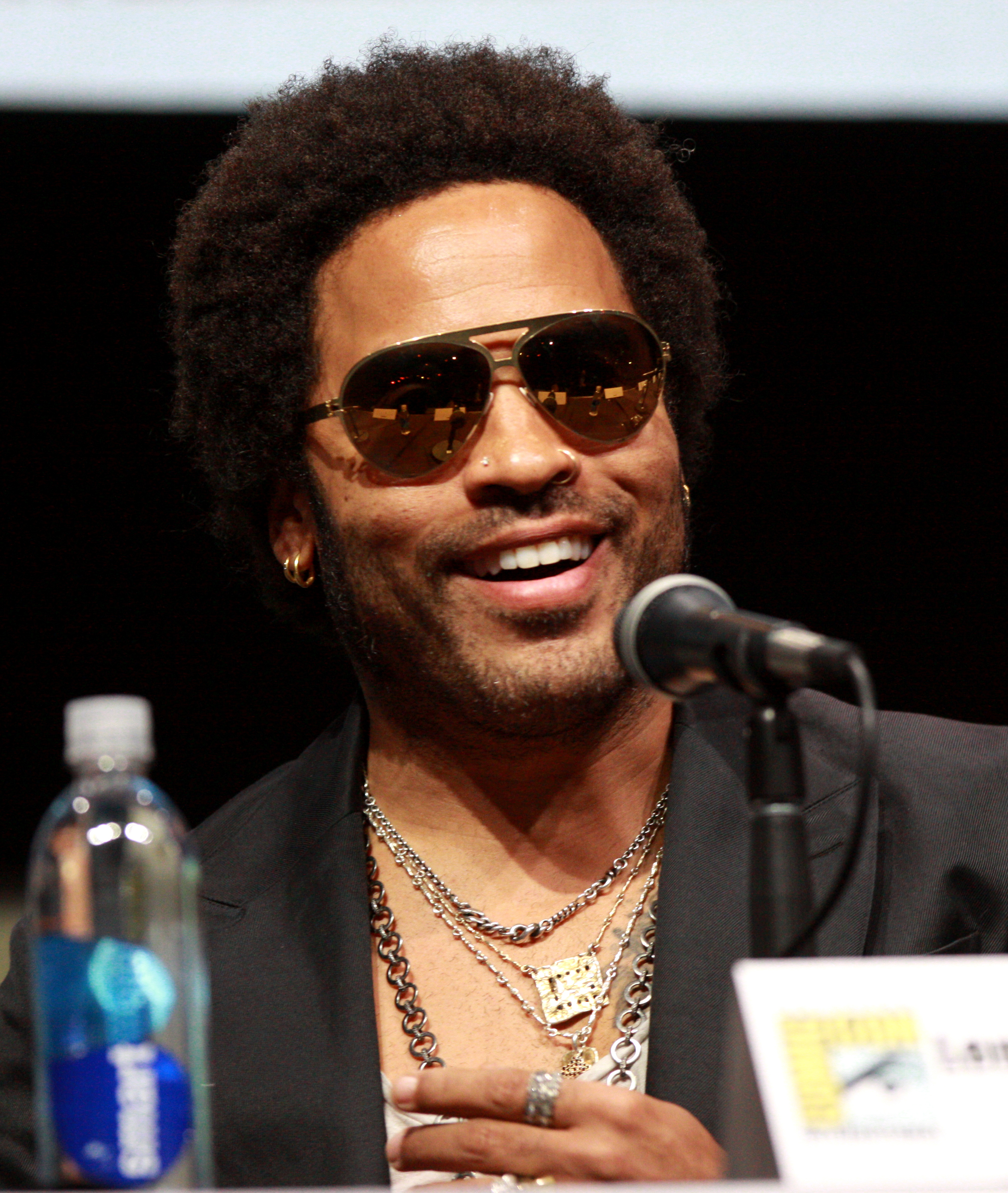
Lenny Kravitz

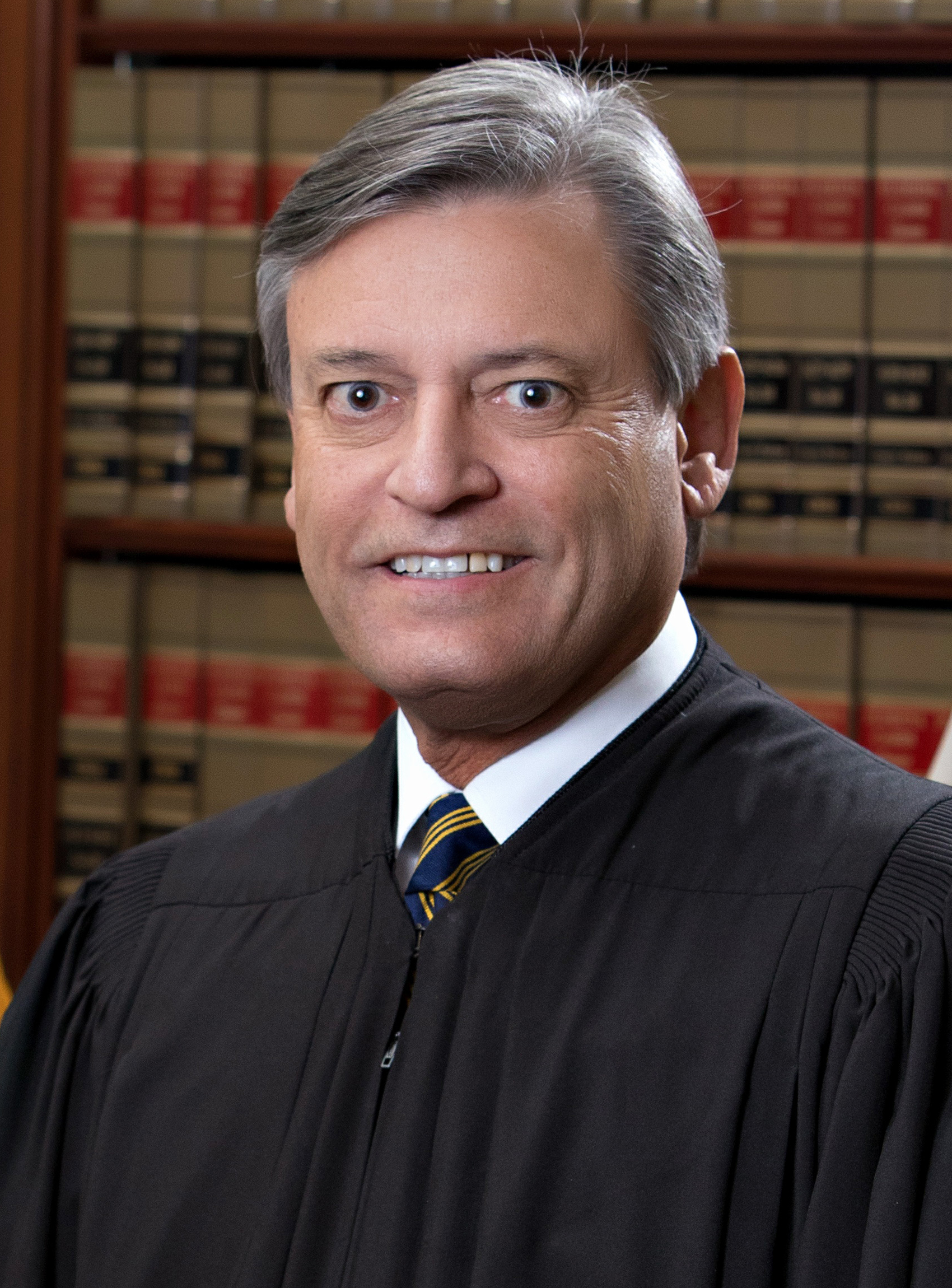
Jorge Labarga

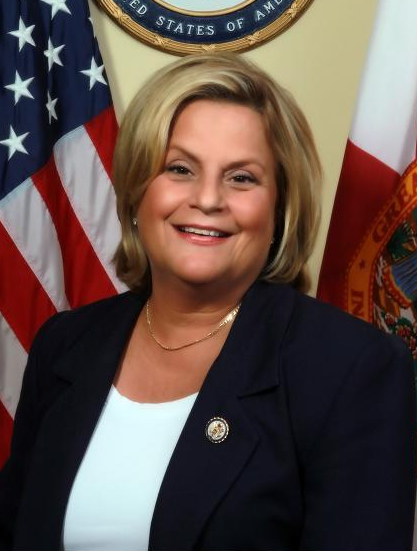
Ileana Ros-Lehtinen

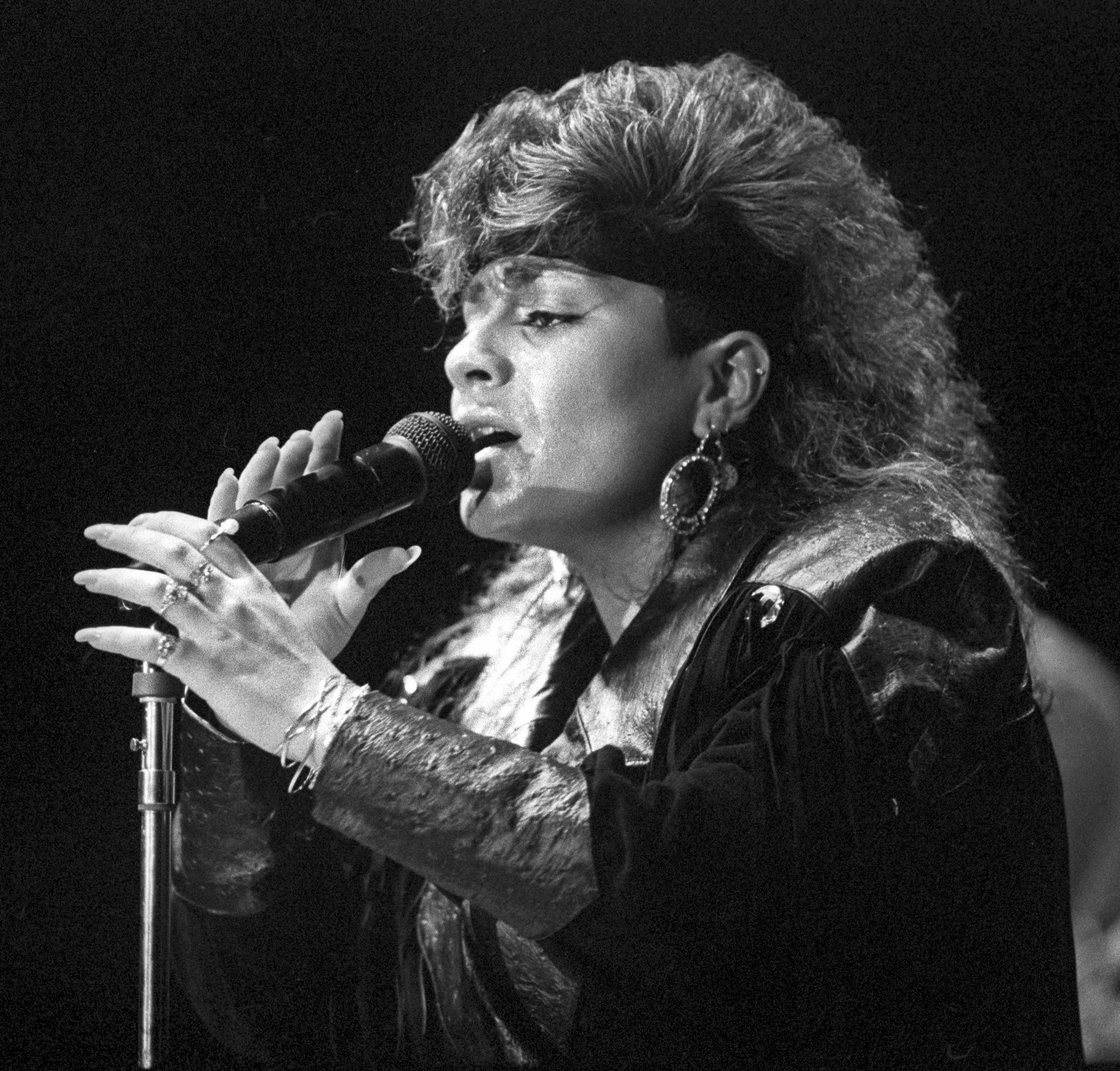
Lisa Lisa

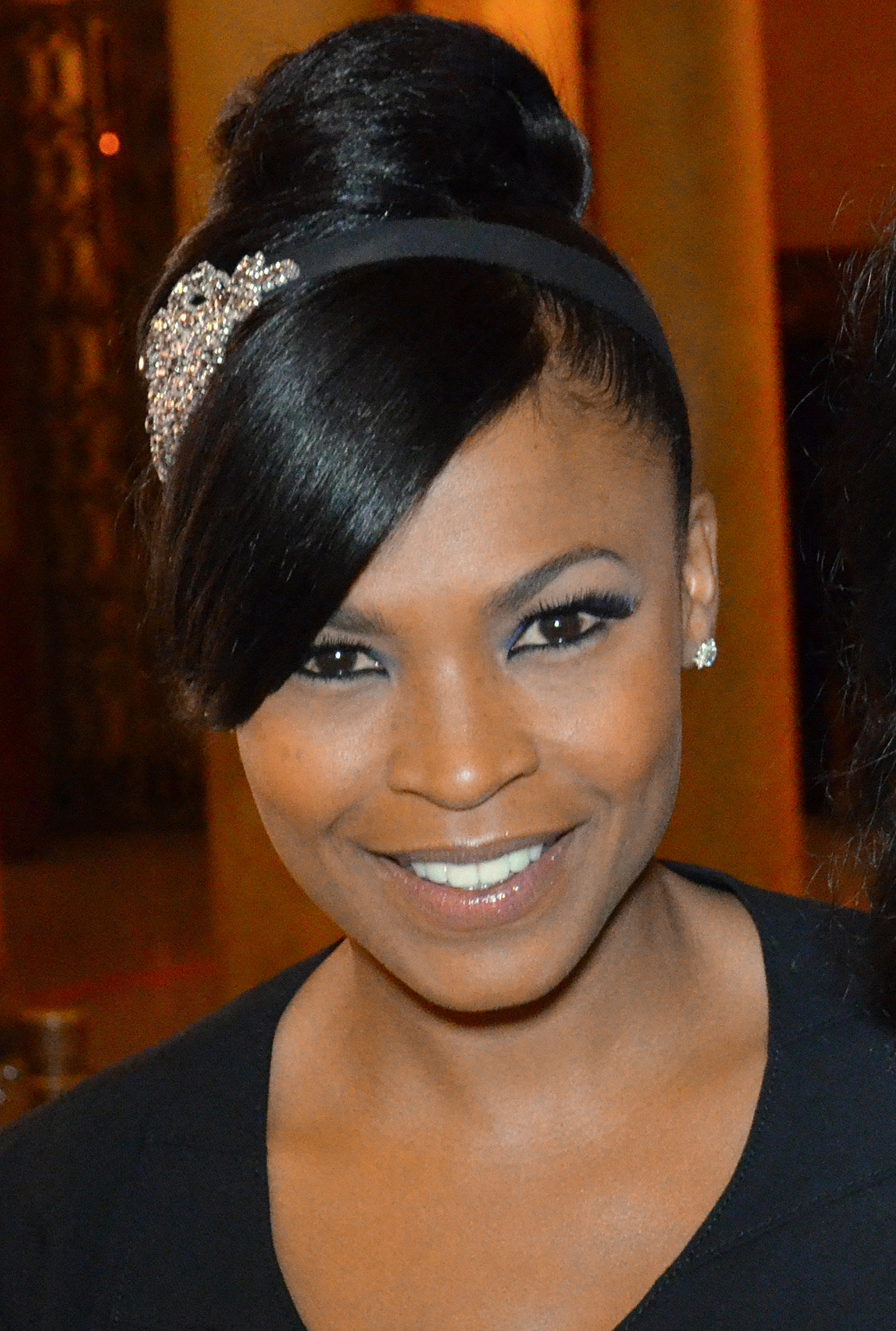
Nia Long

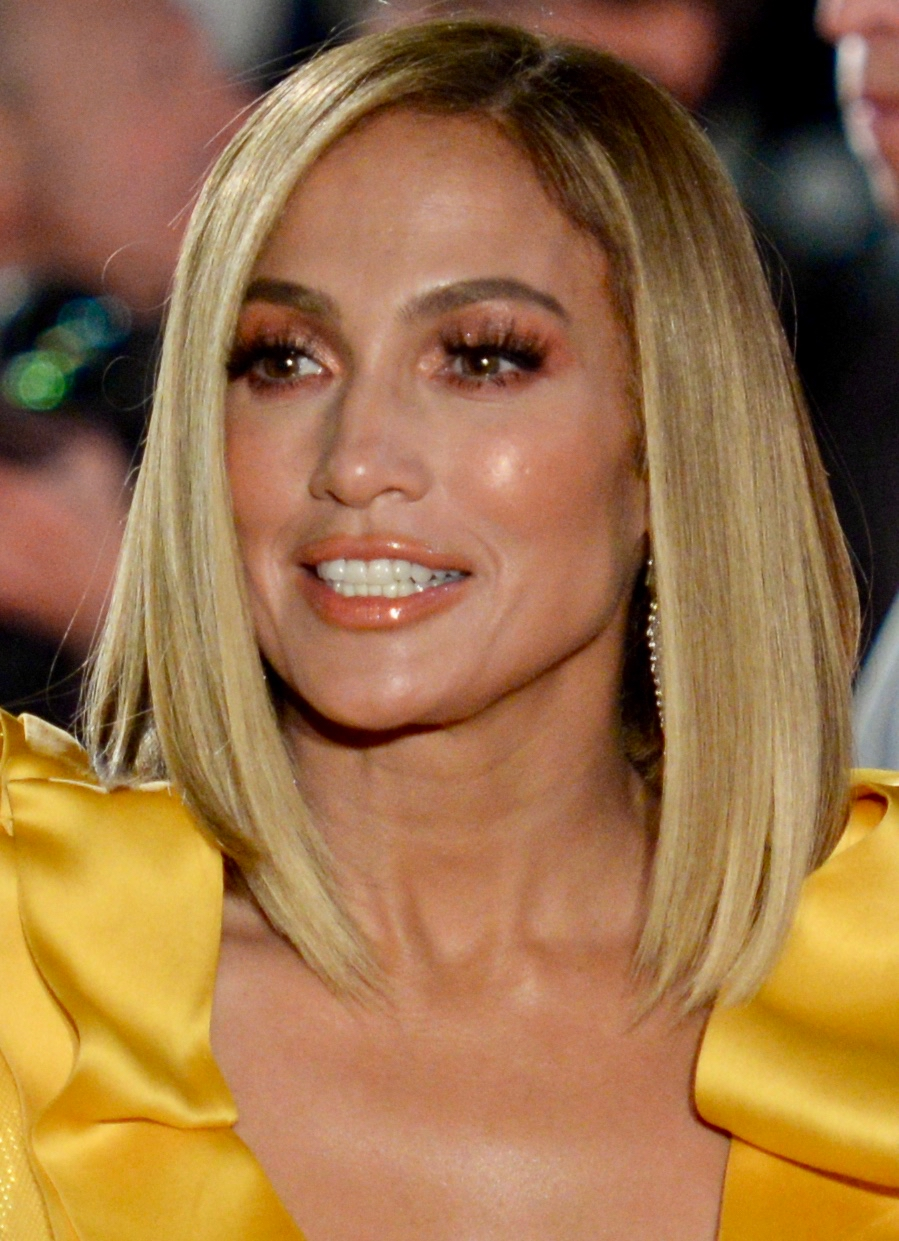
Jennifer Lopez

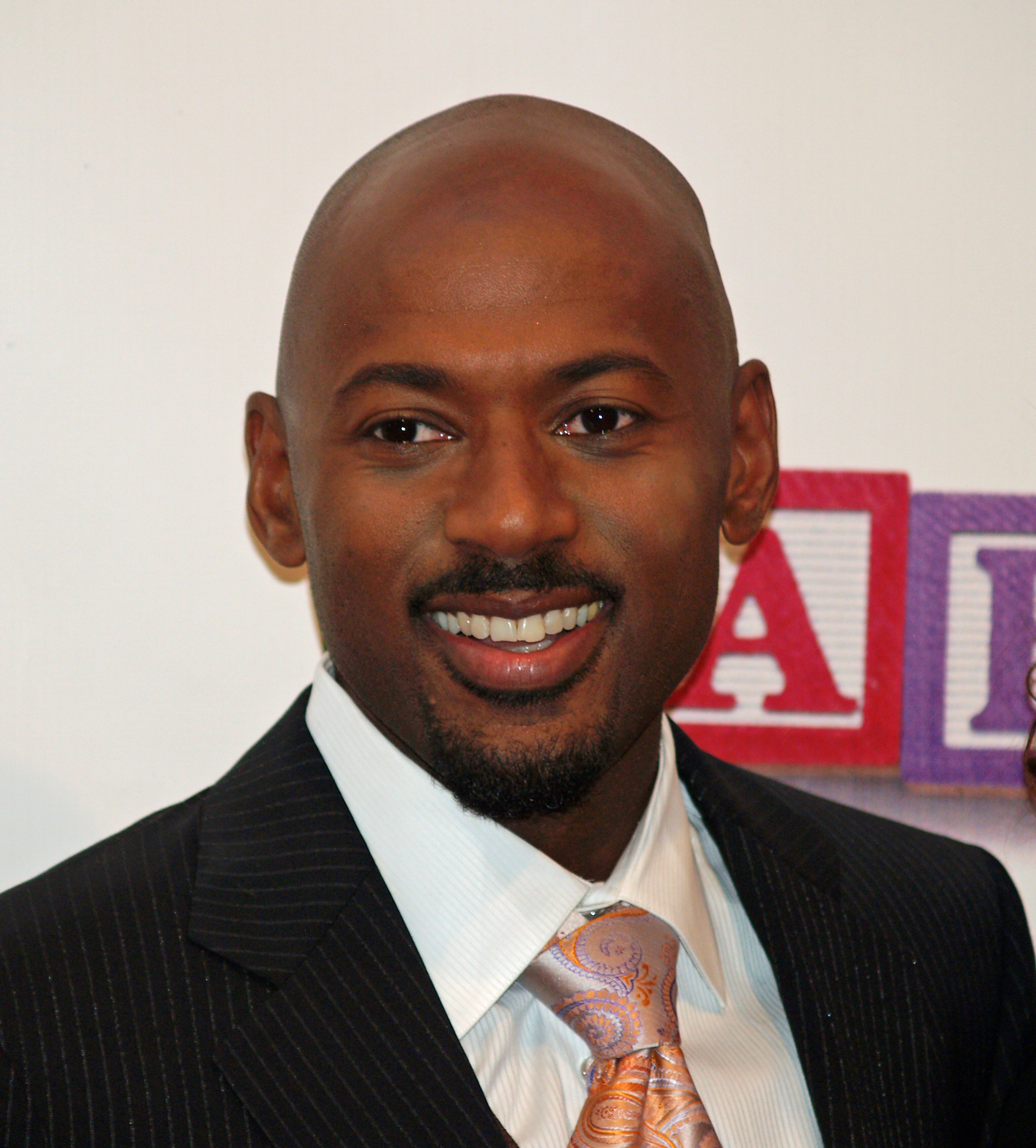
Romany Malco

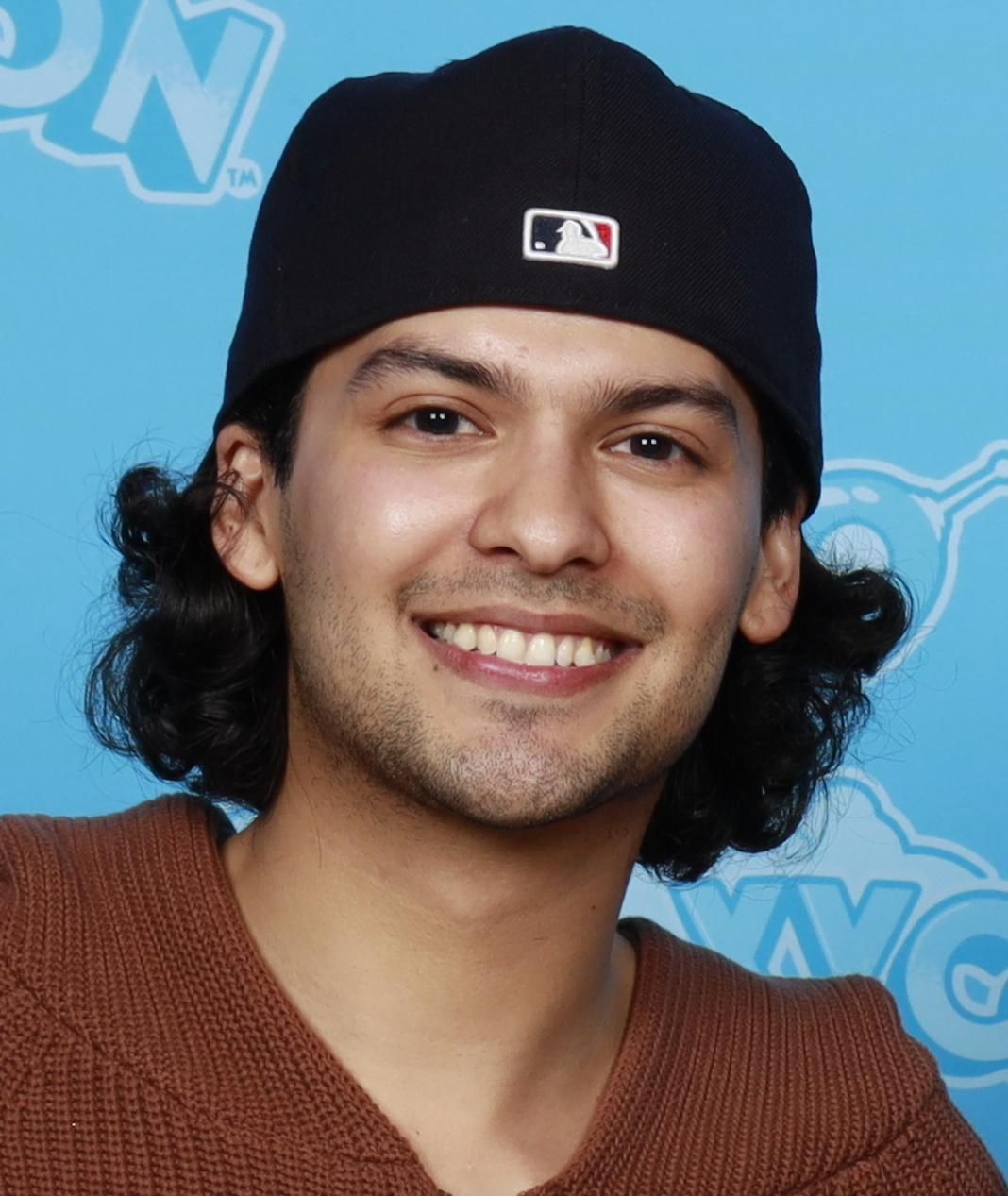
Xolo Maridueña

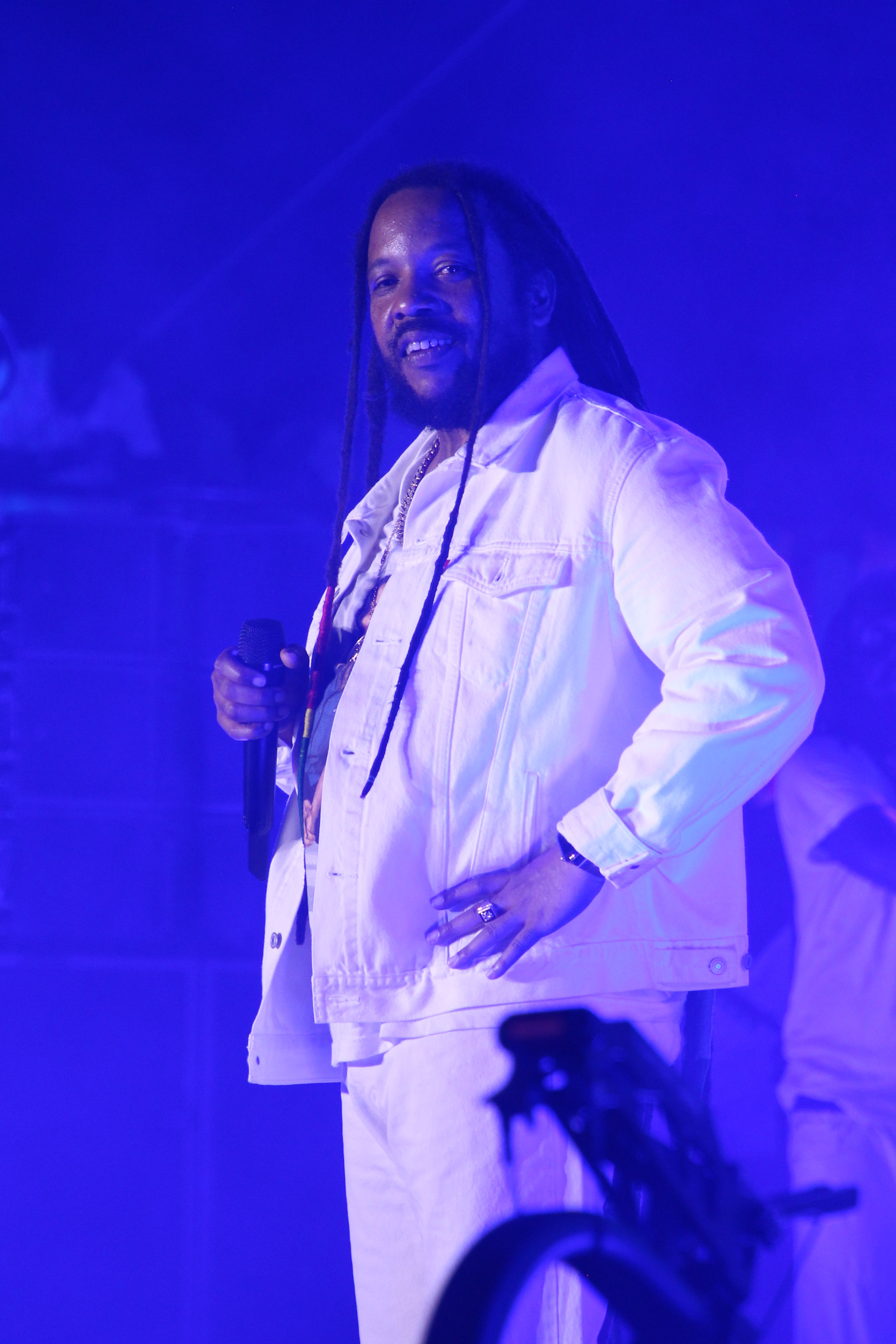
Stephen Marley

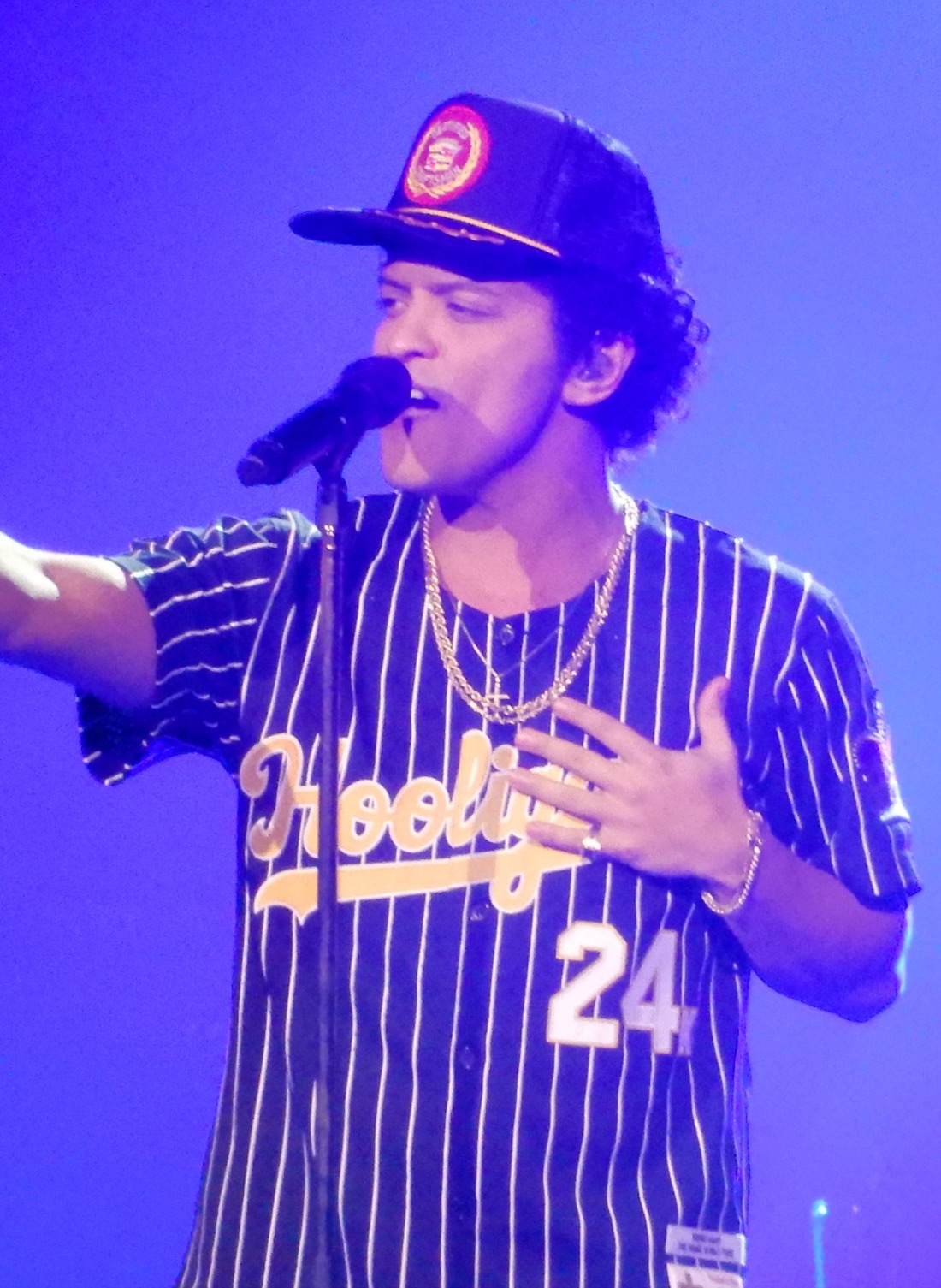
Bruno Mars

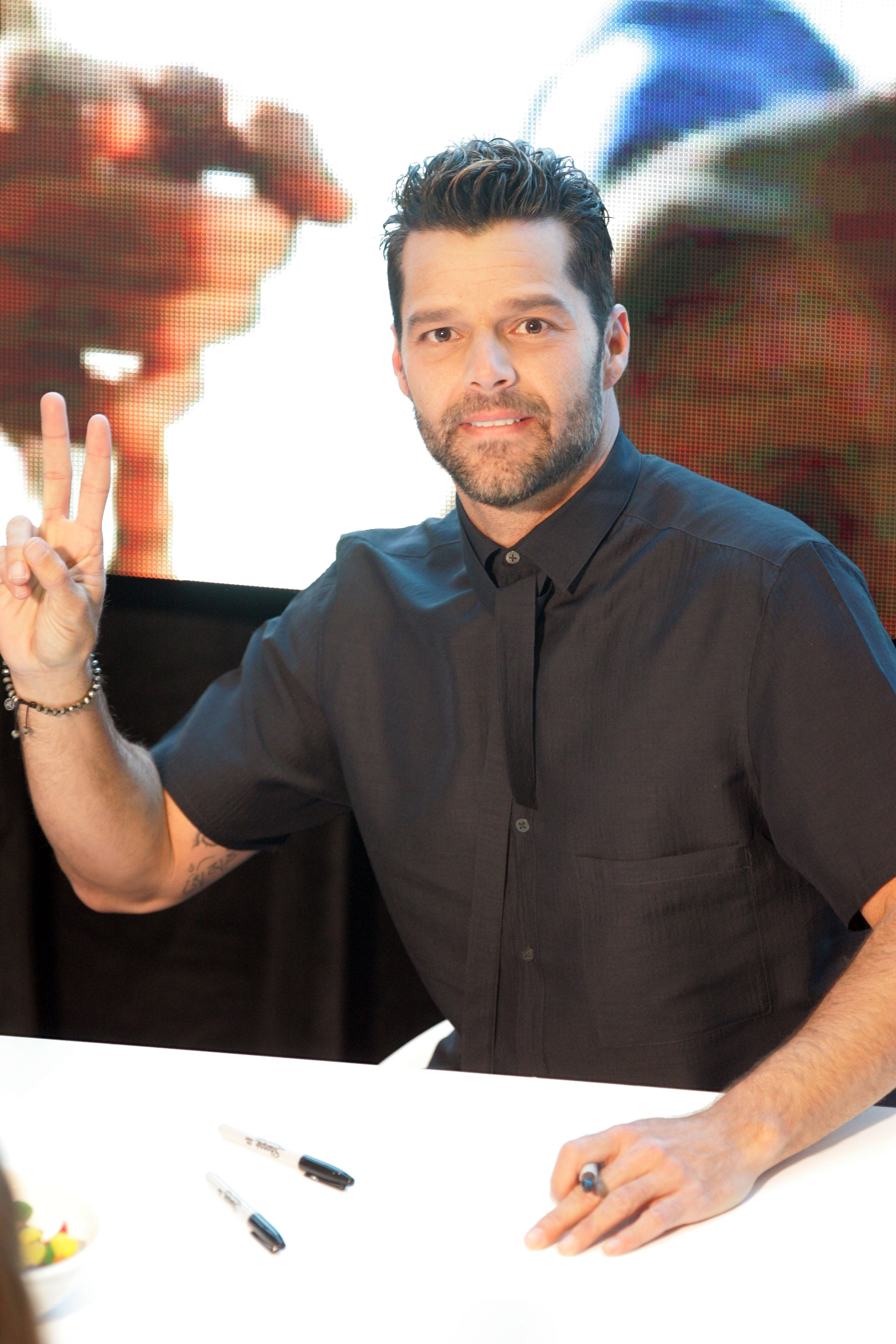
Ricky Martin

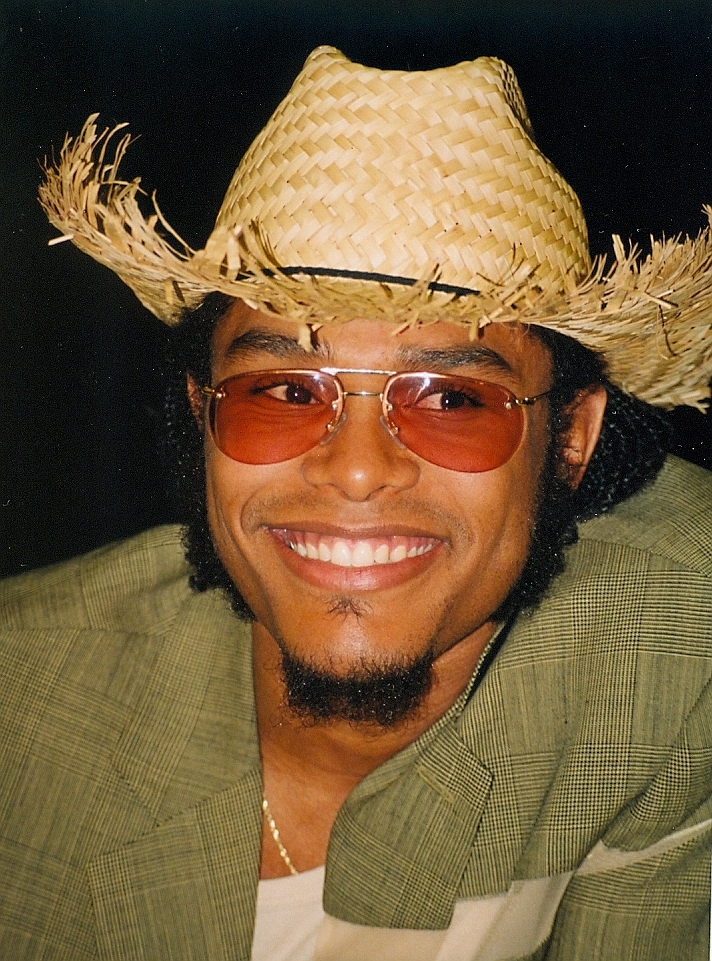
Maxwell

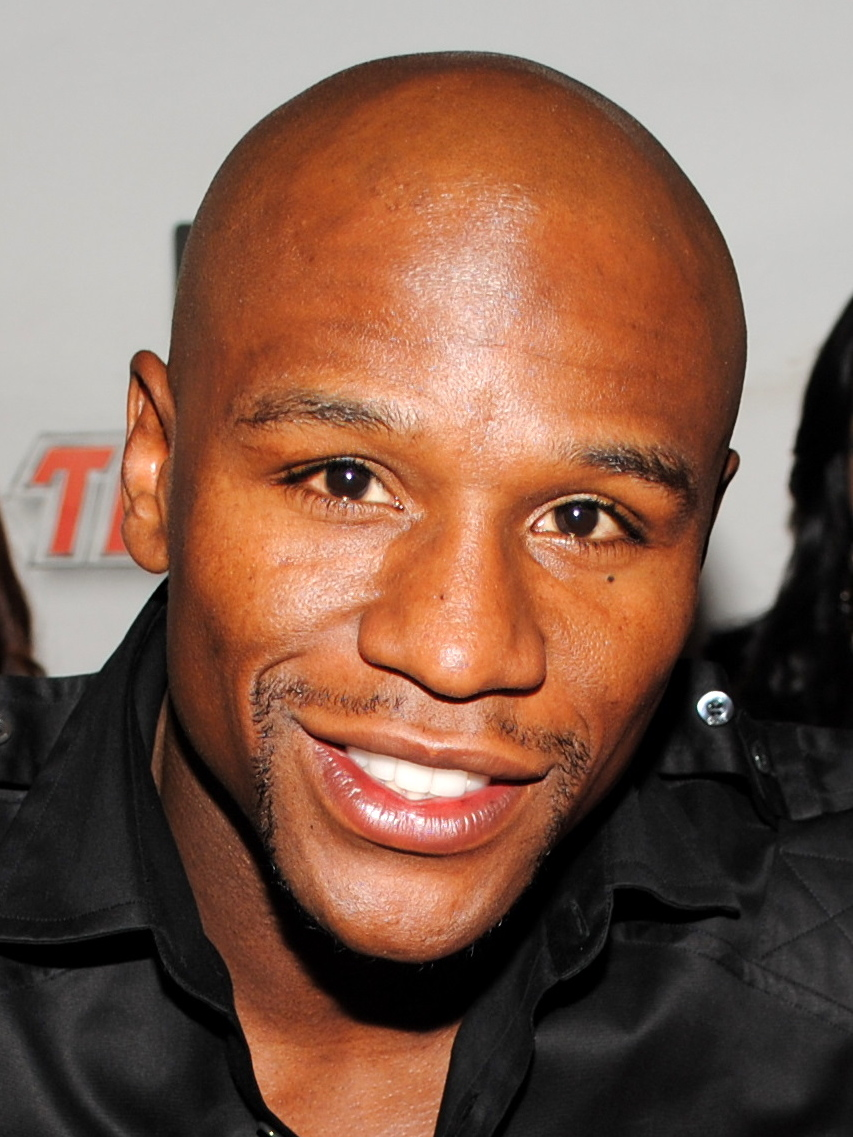
Floyd Mayweather Jr.

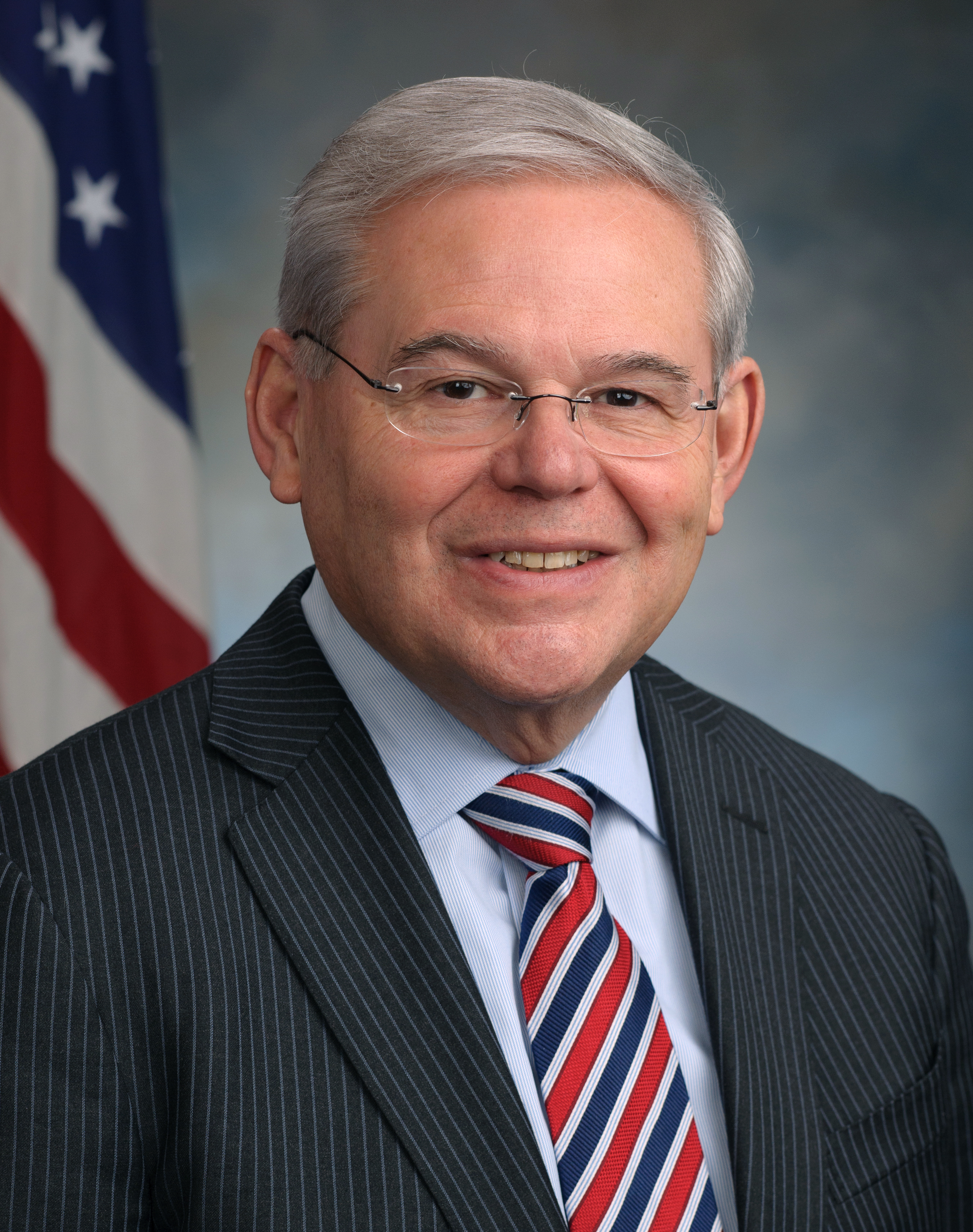
Bob Menendez

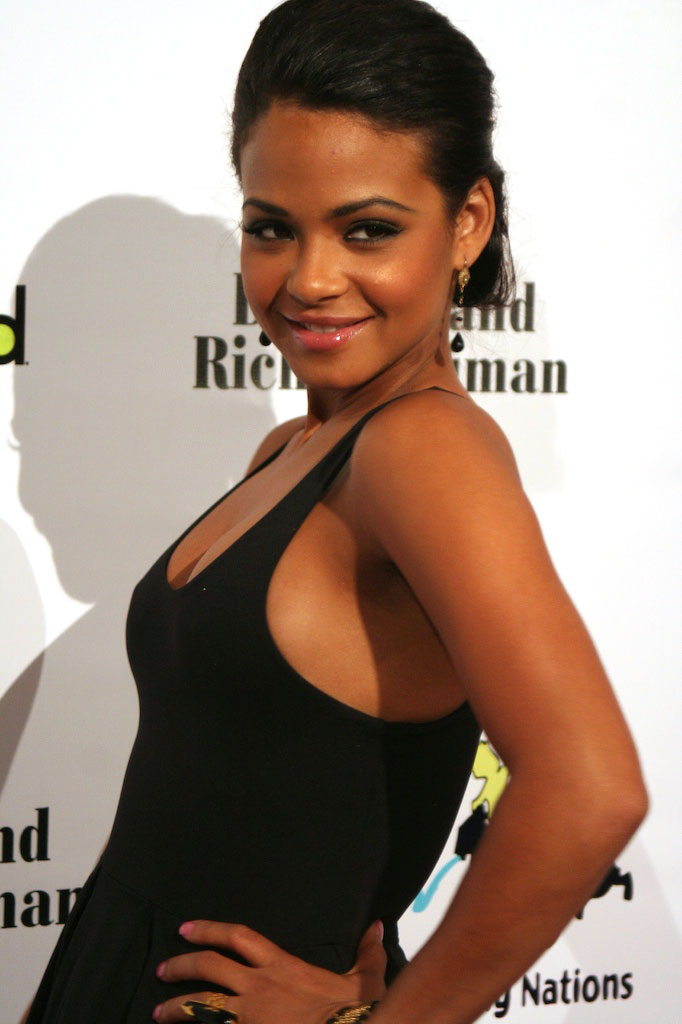
Christina Milian

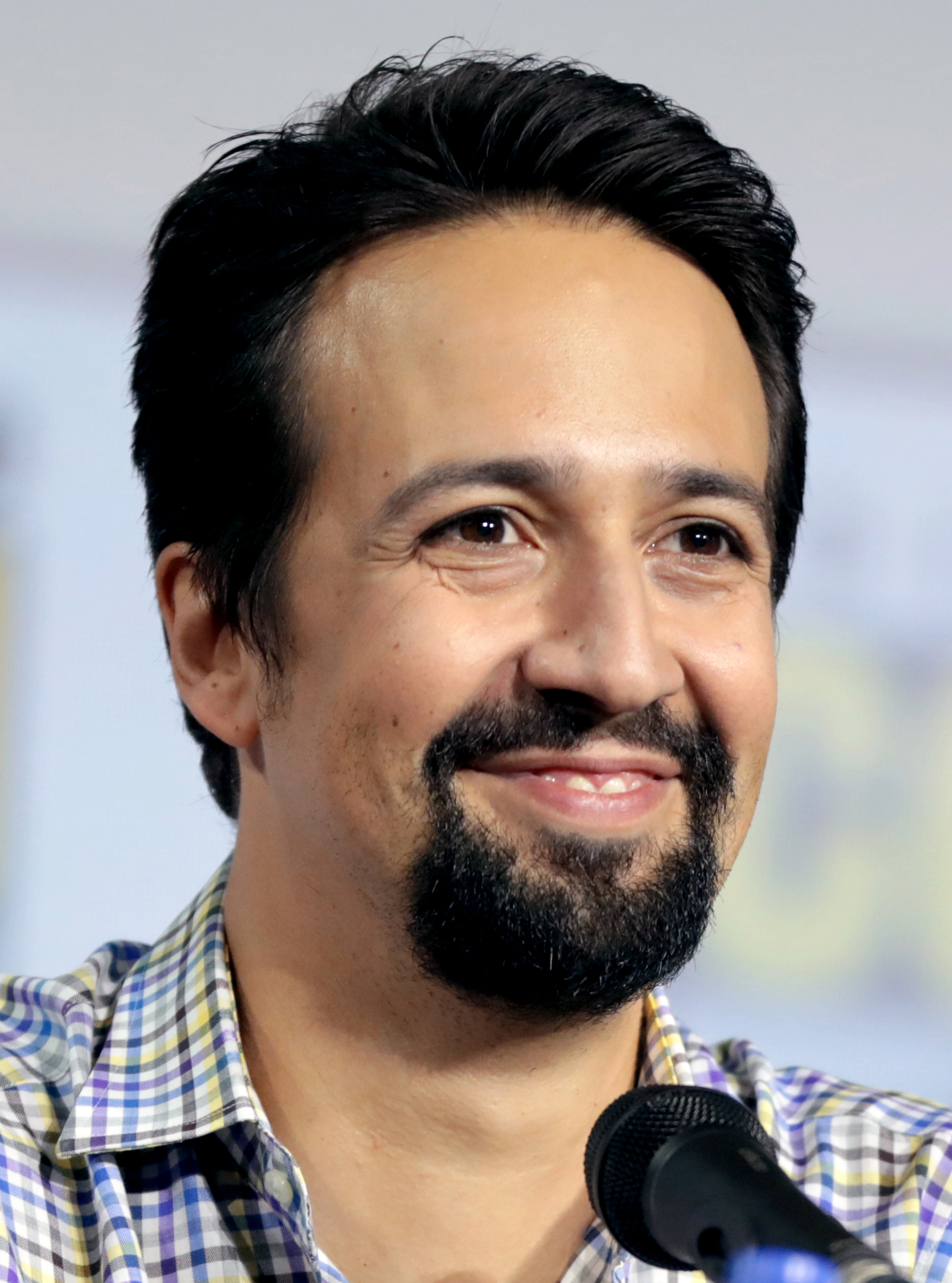
Lin-Manuel Miranda

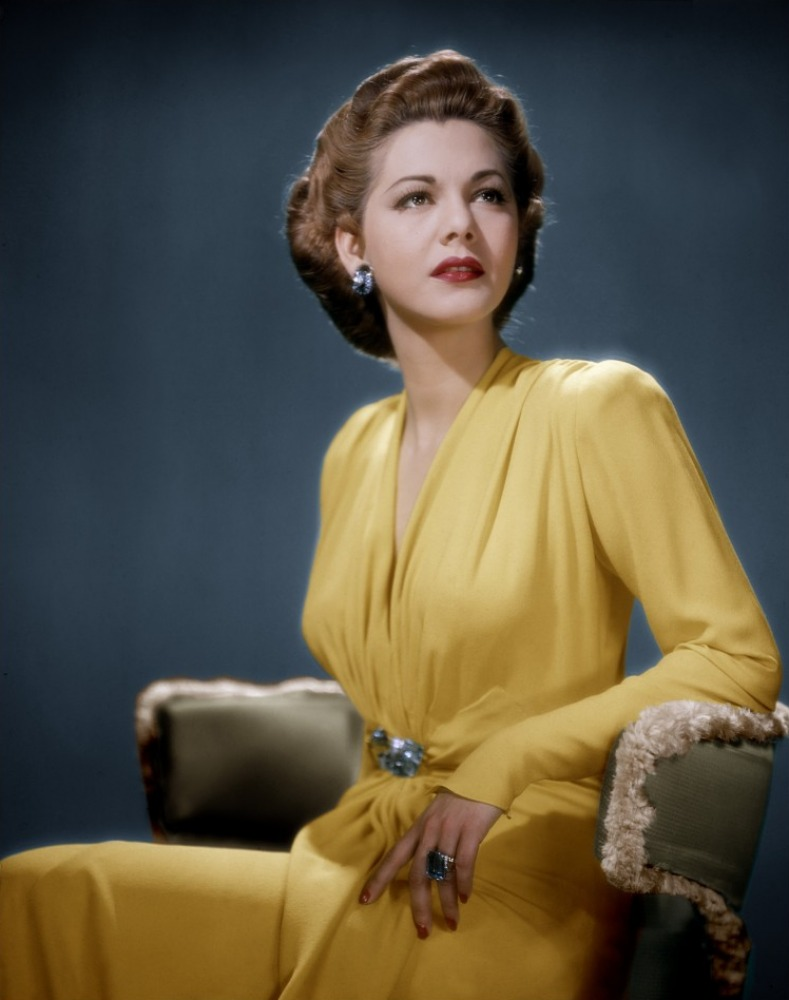
Maria Montez

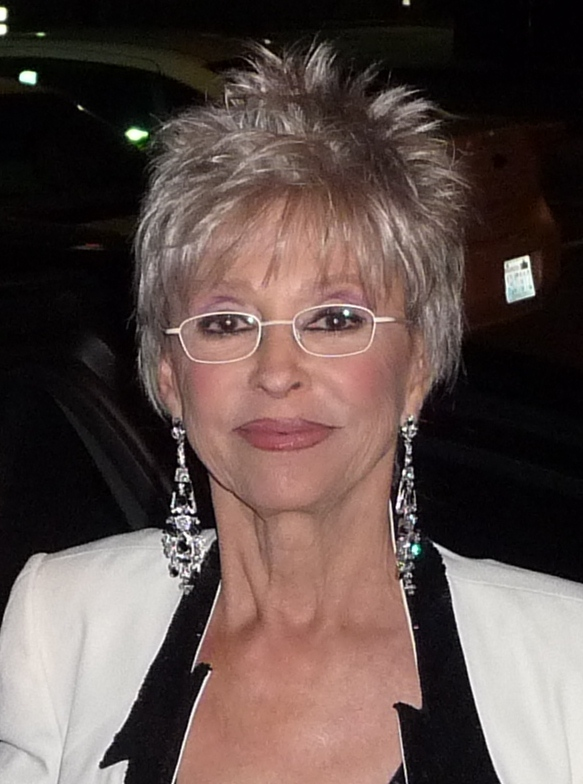
Rita Moreno

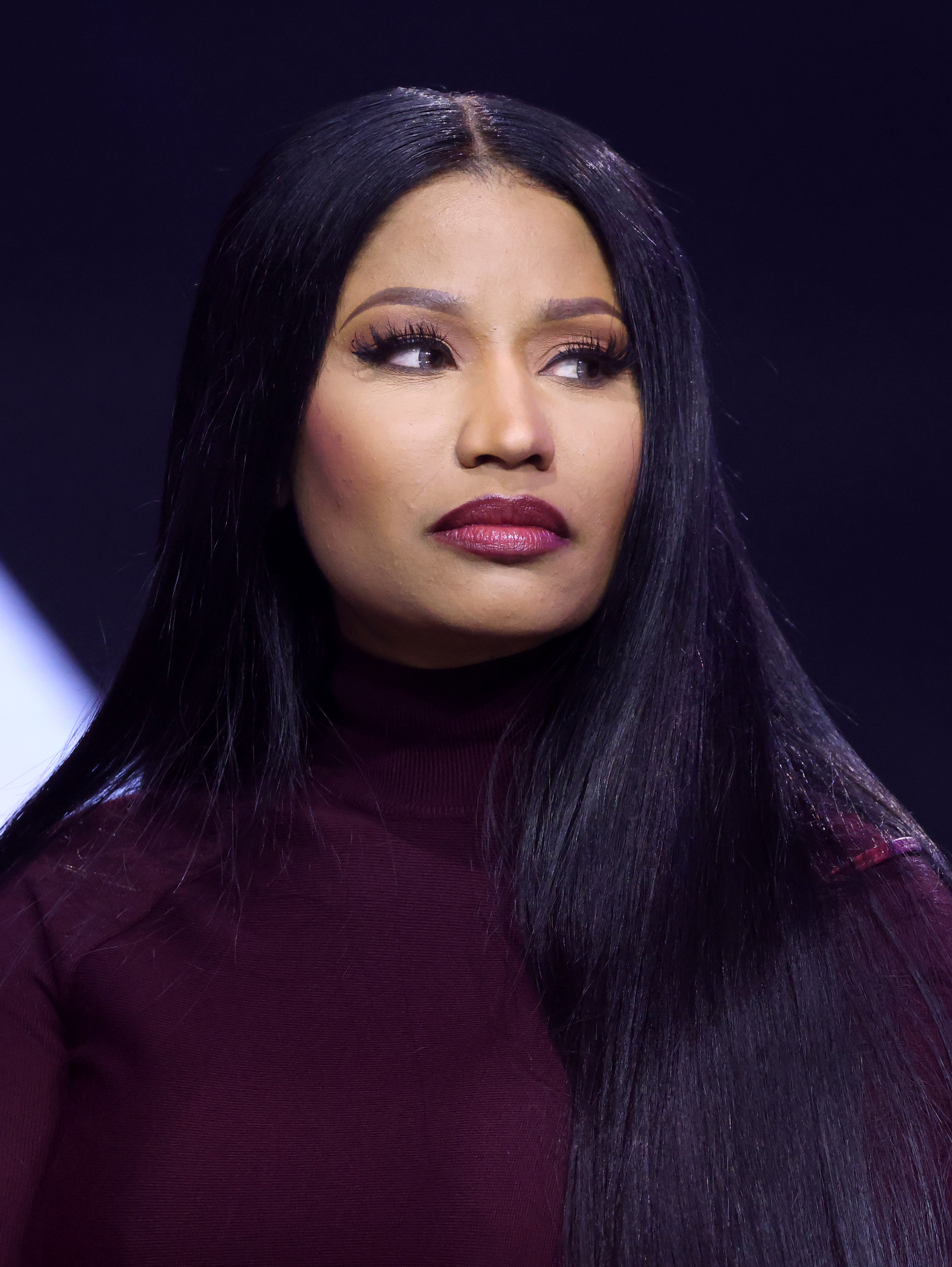
Nicki Minaj

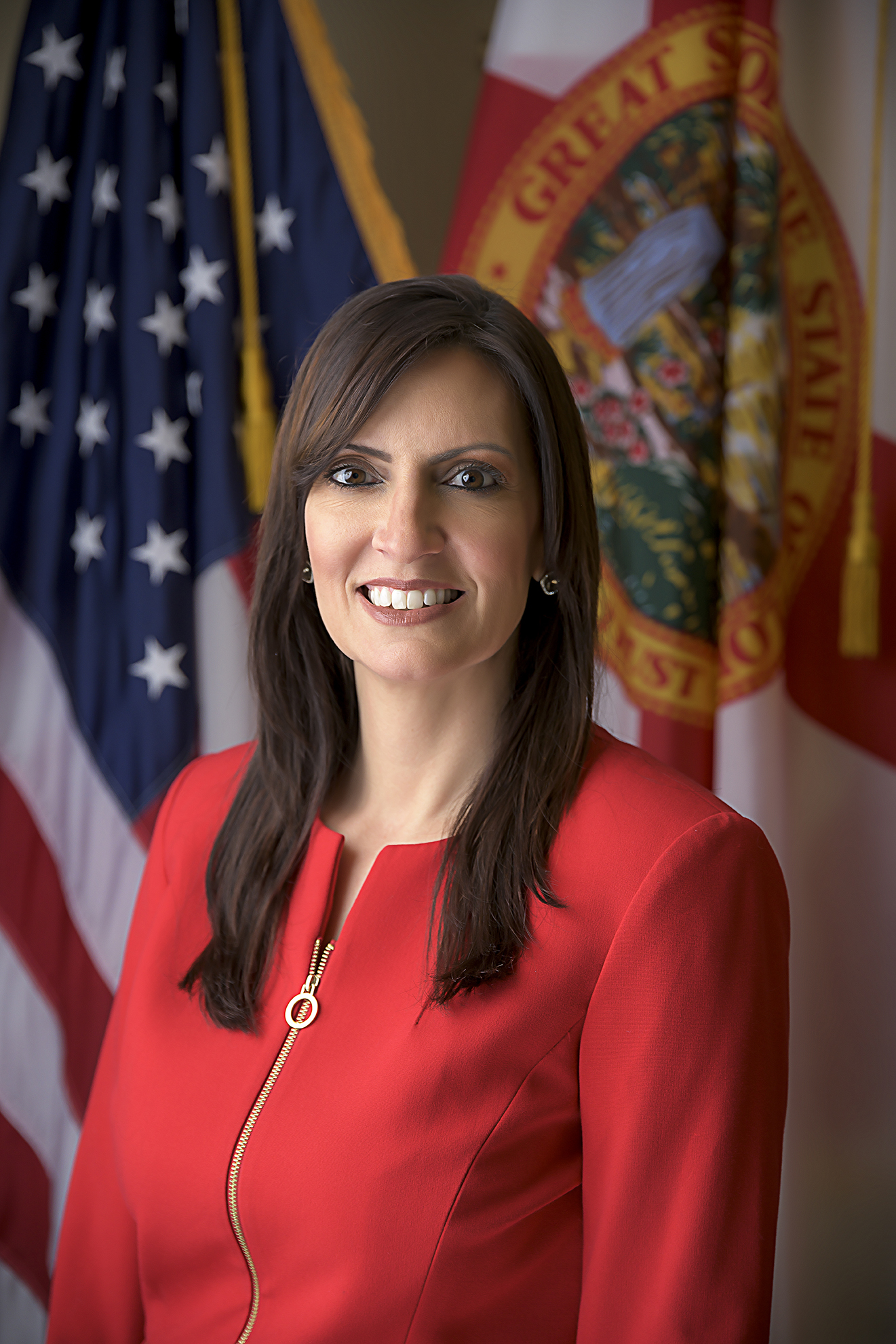
Jeanette Nuñez

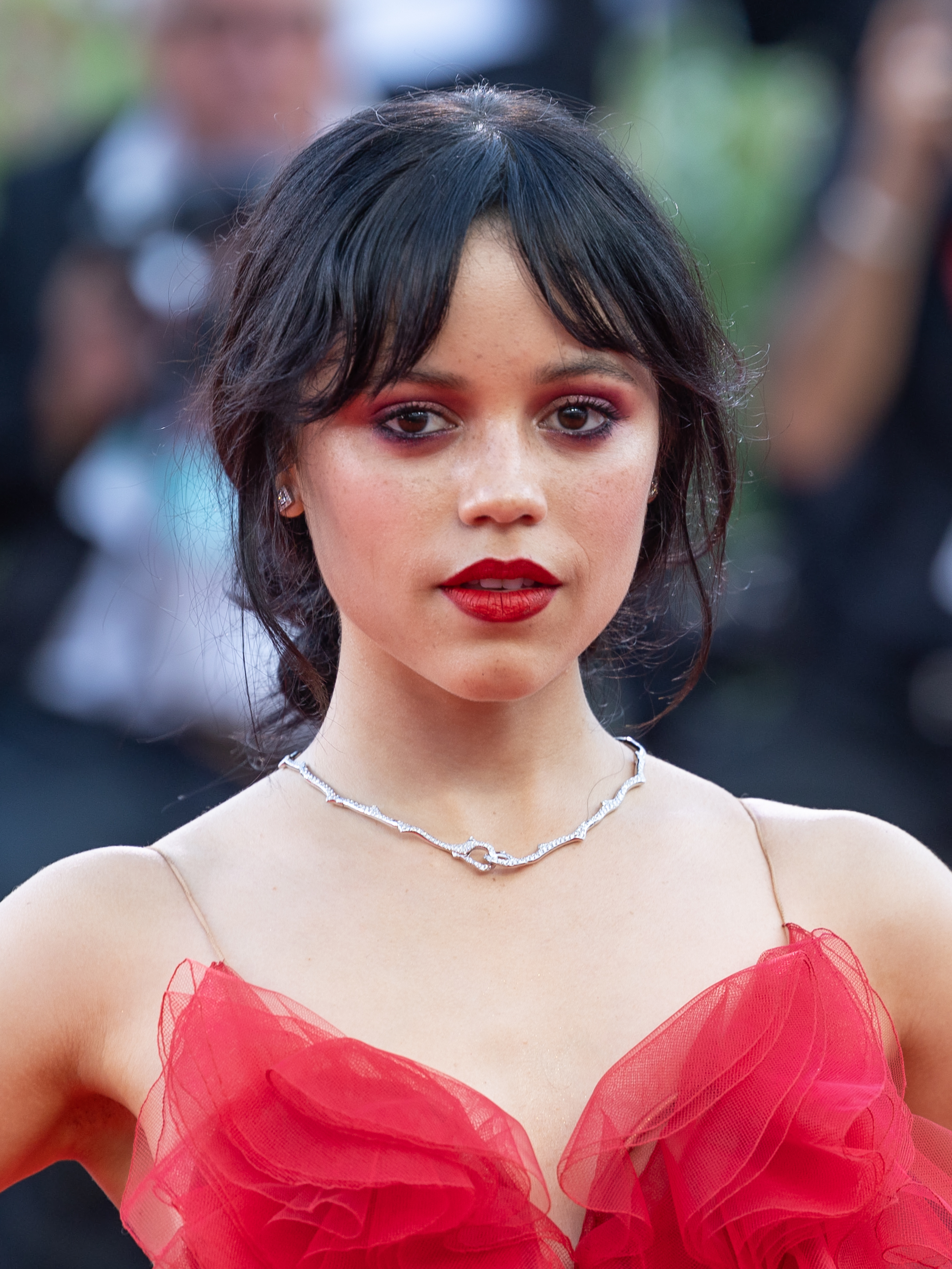
Jenna Ortega

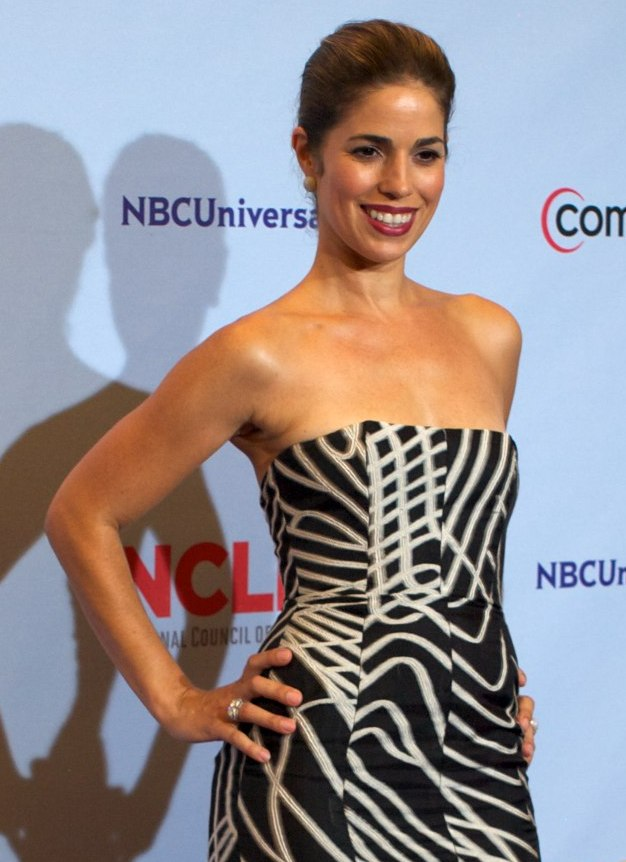
Ana Ortiz

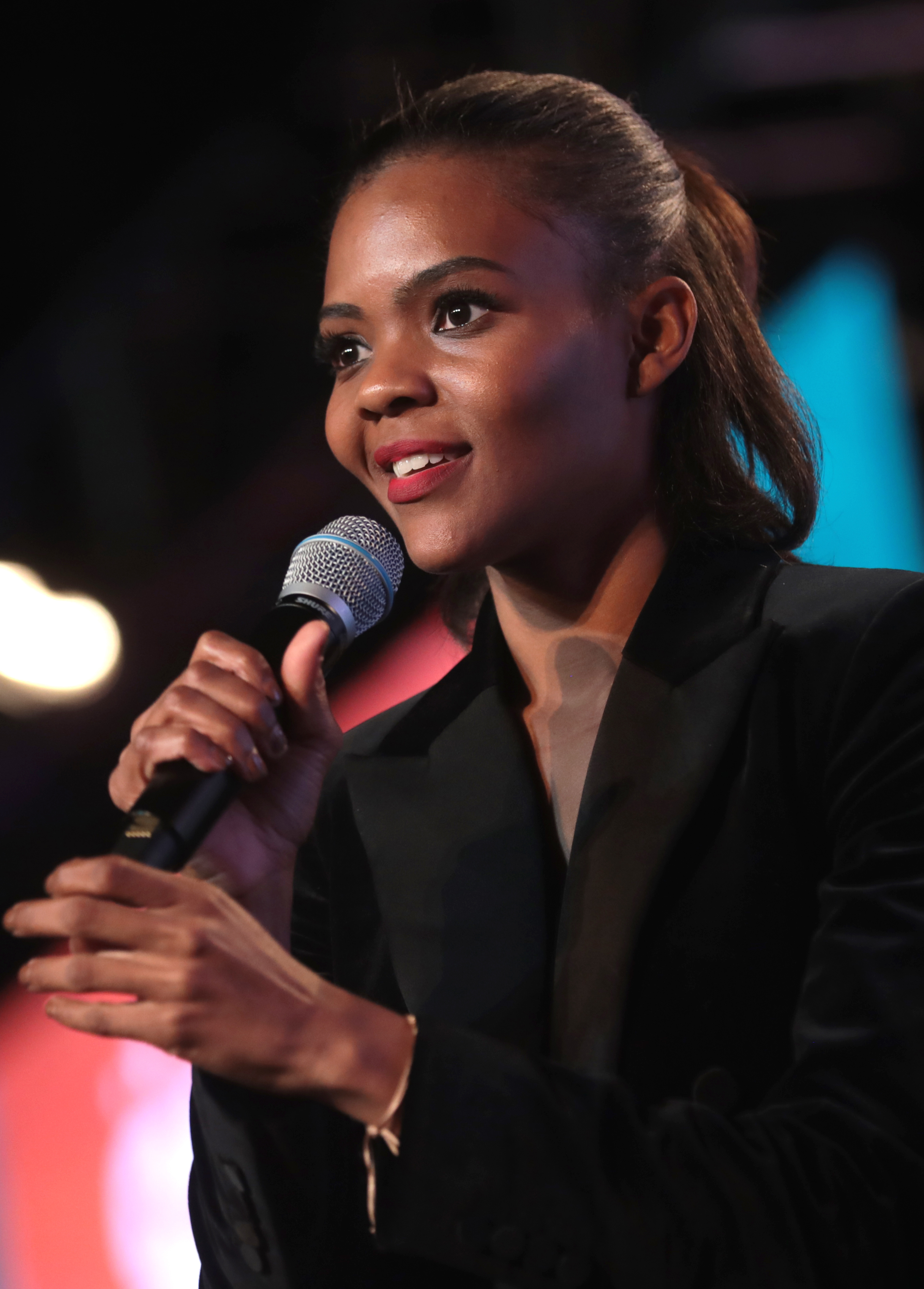
Candace Owens

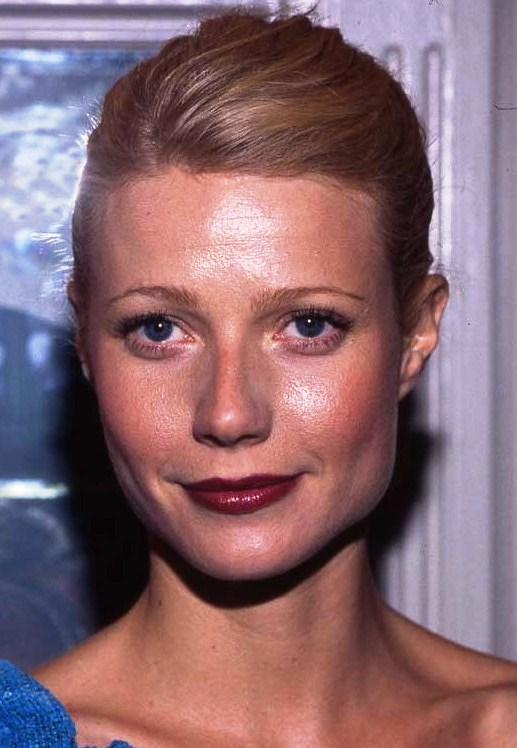
Gwyneth Paltrow

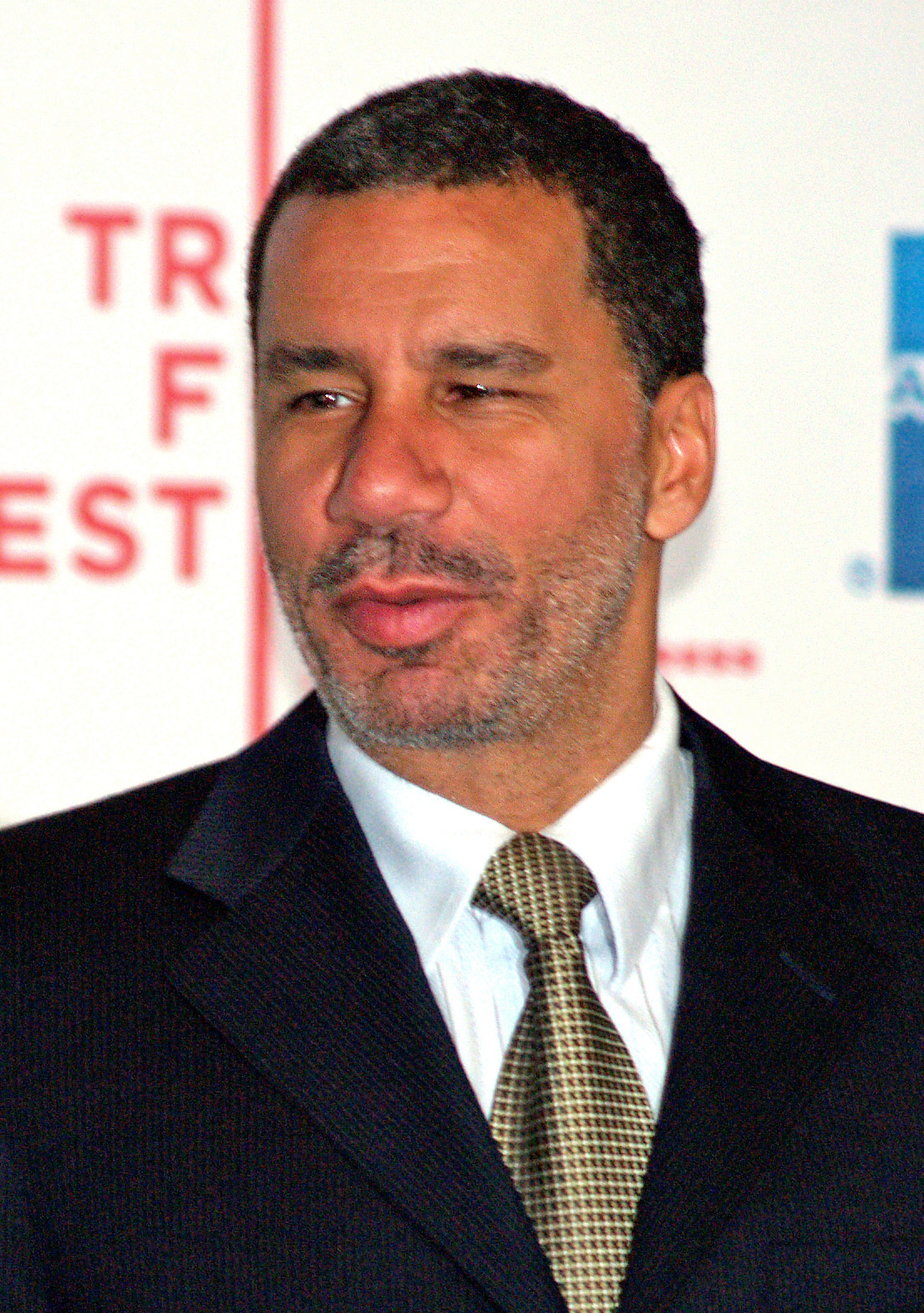
David Paterson

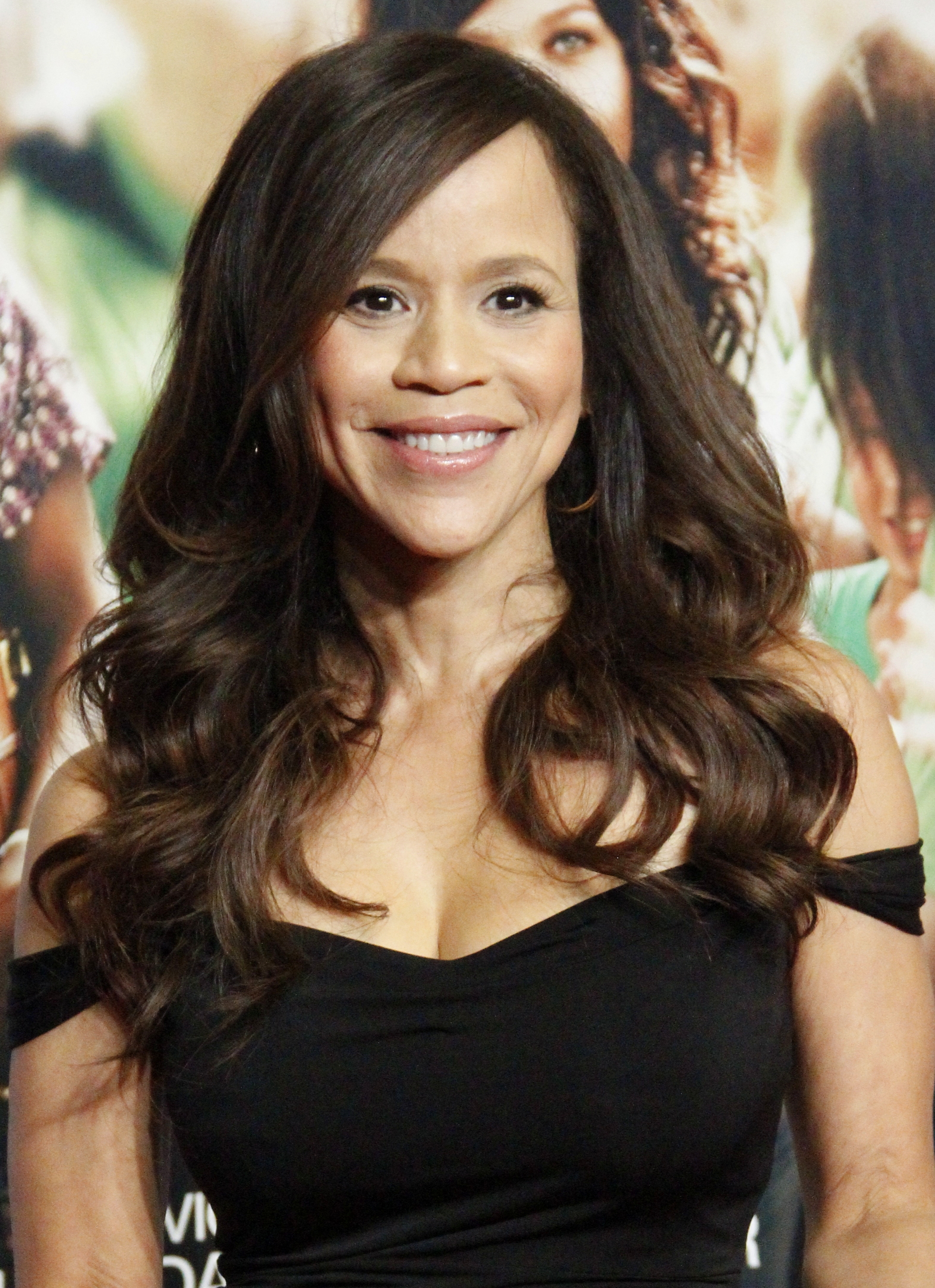
Rosie Perez

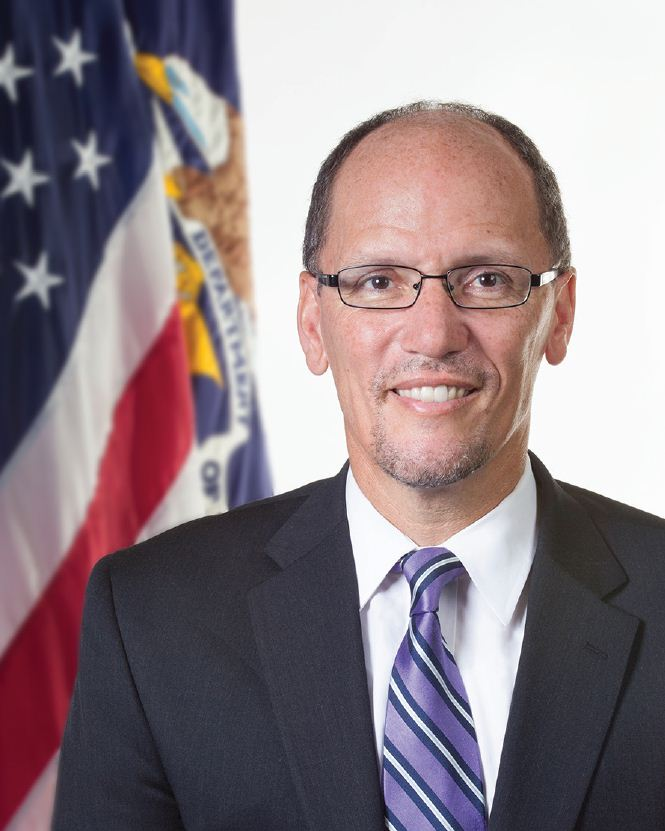
Tom Perez

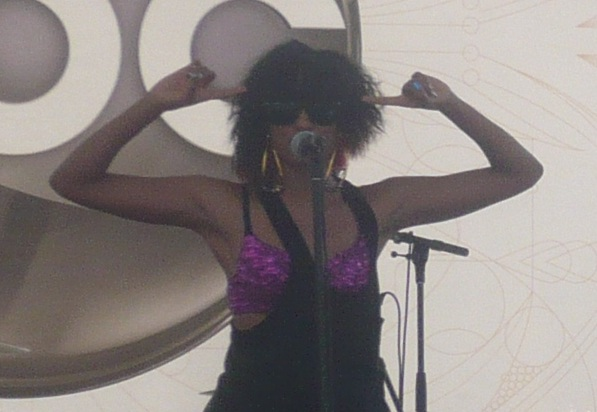
Anjulie Persaud

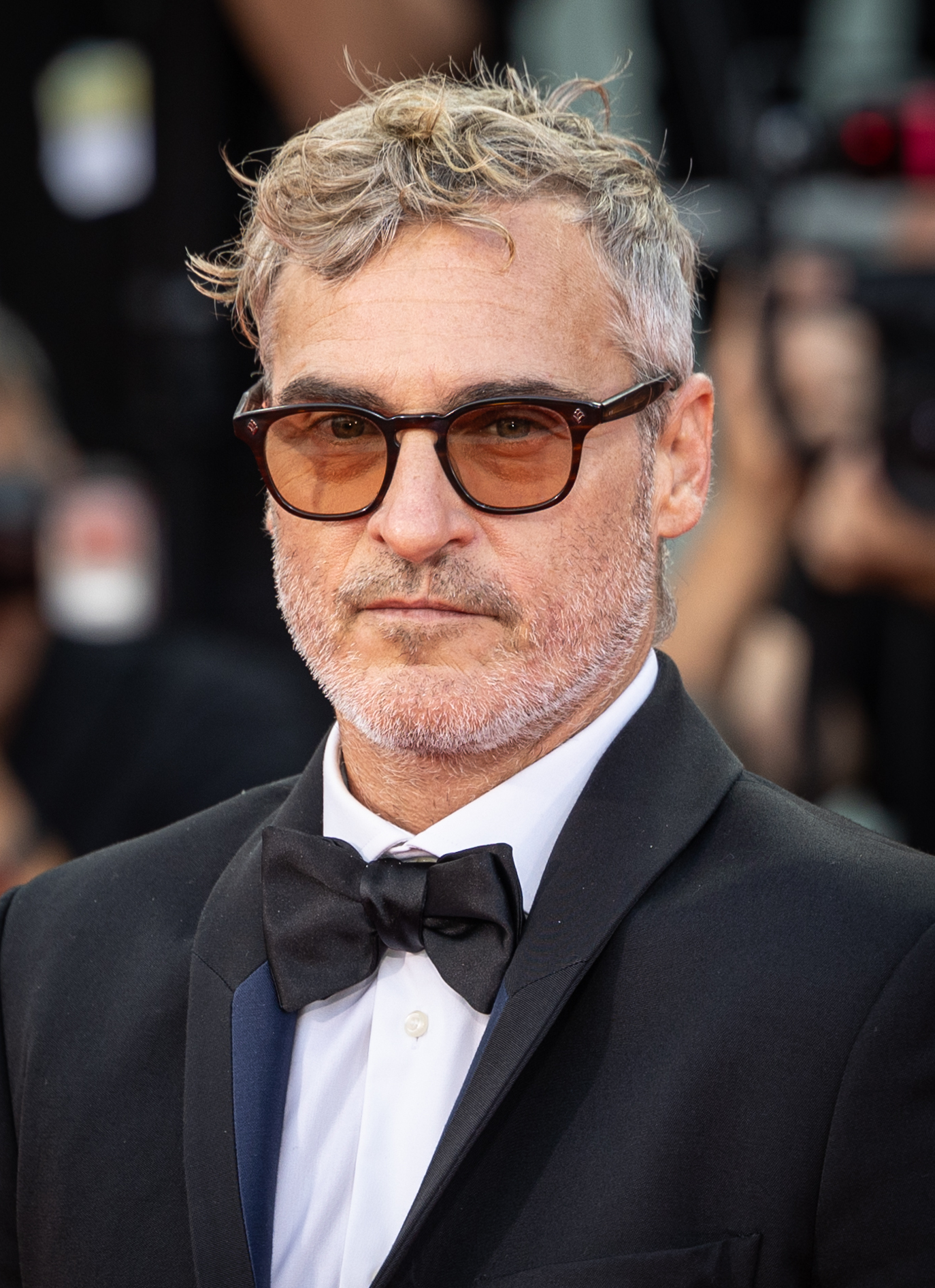
Joaquin Phoenix

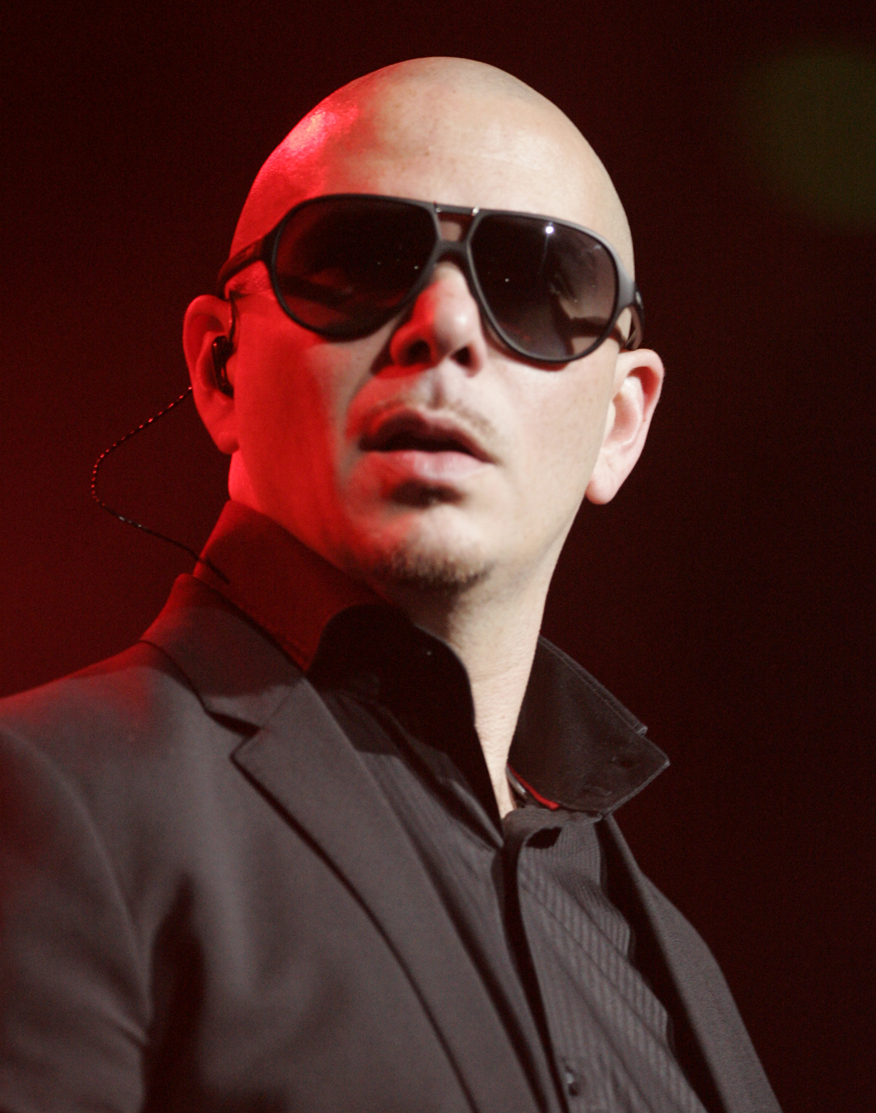
Pitbull

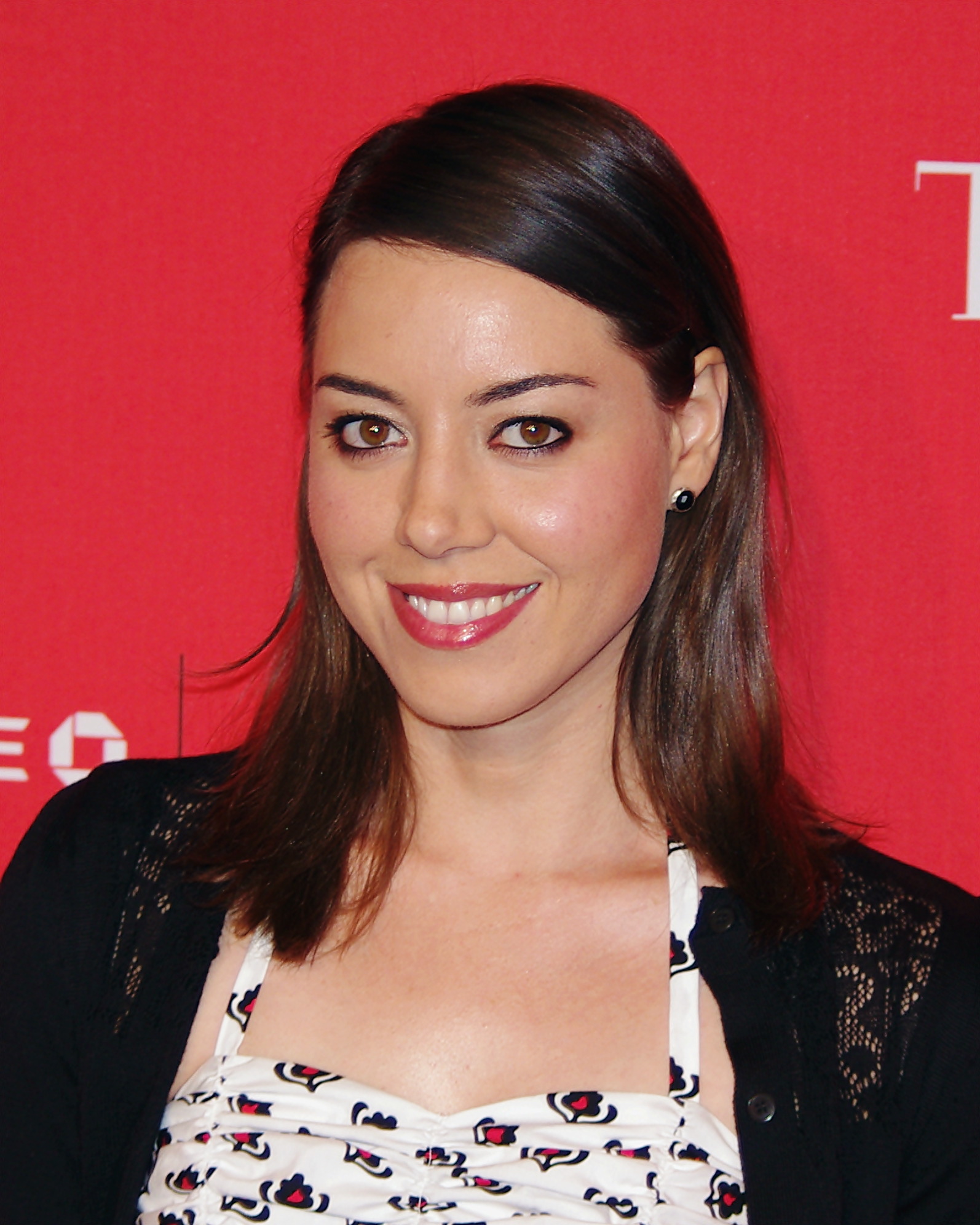
Aubrey Plaza

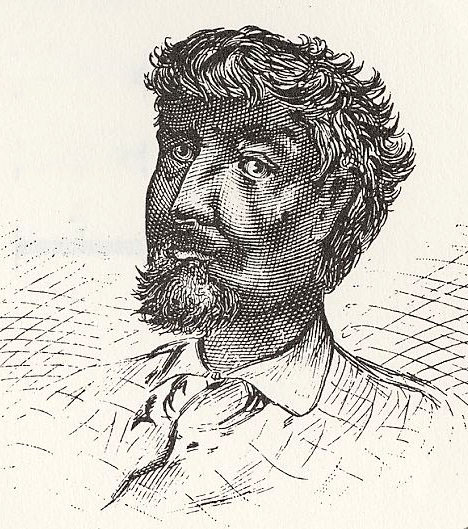
Jean Baptiste Point du Sable

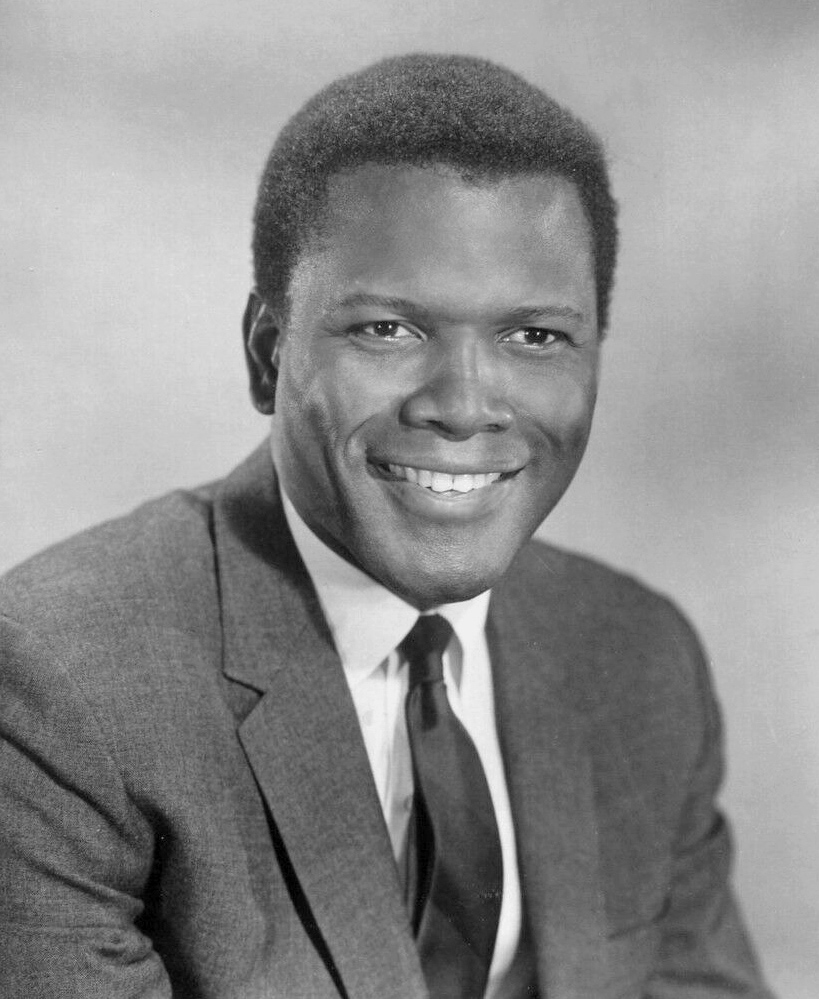
Sidney Poitier

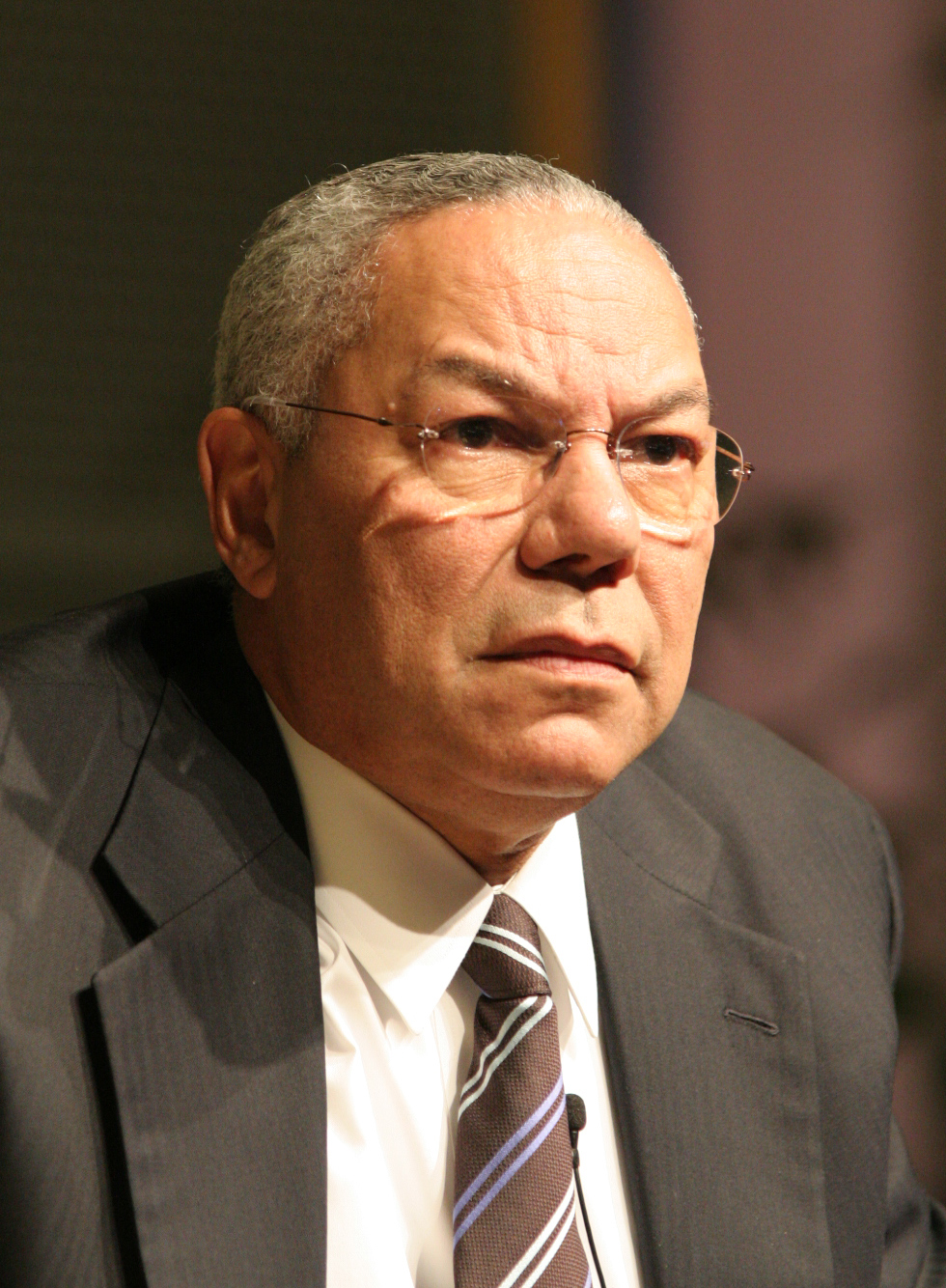
Colin Powell

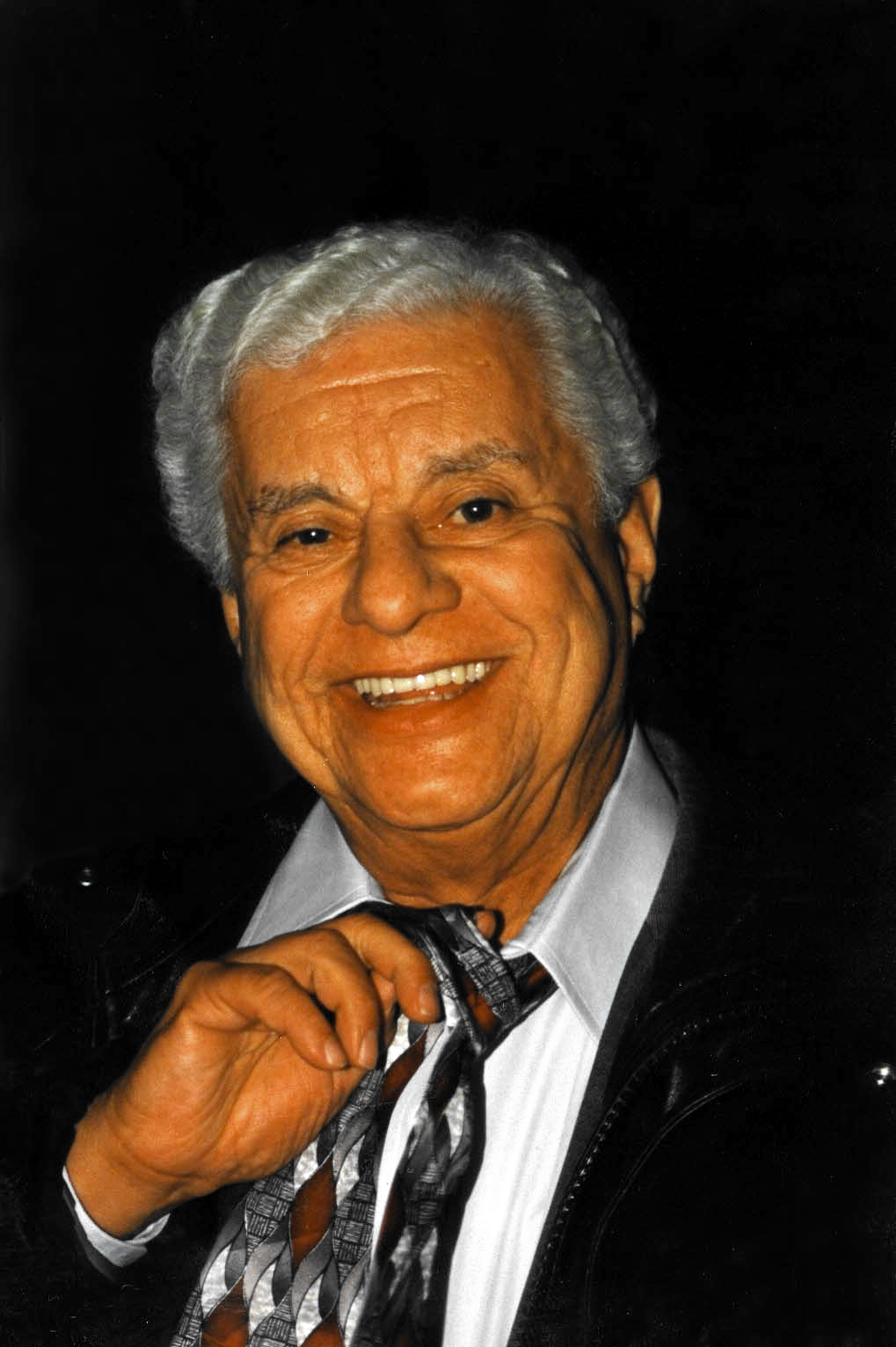
Tito Puente

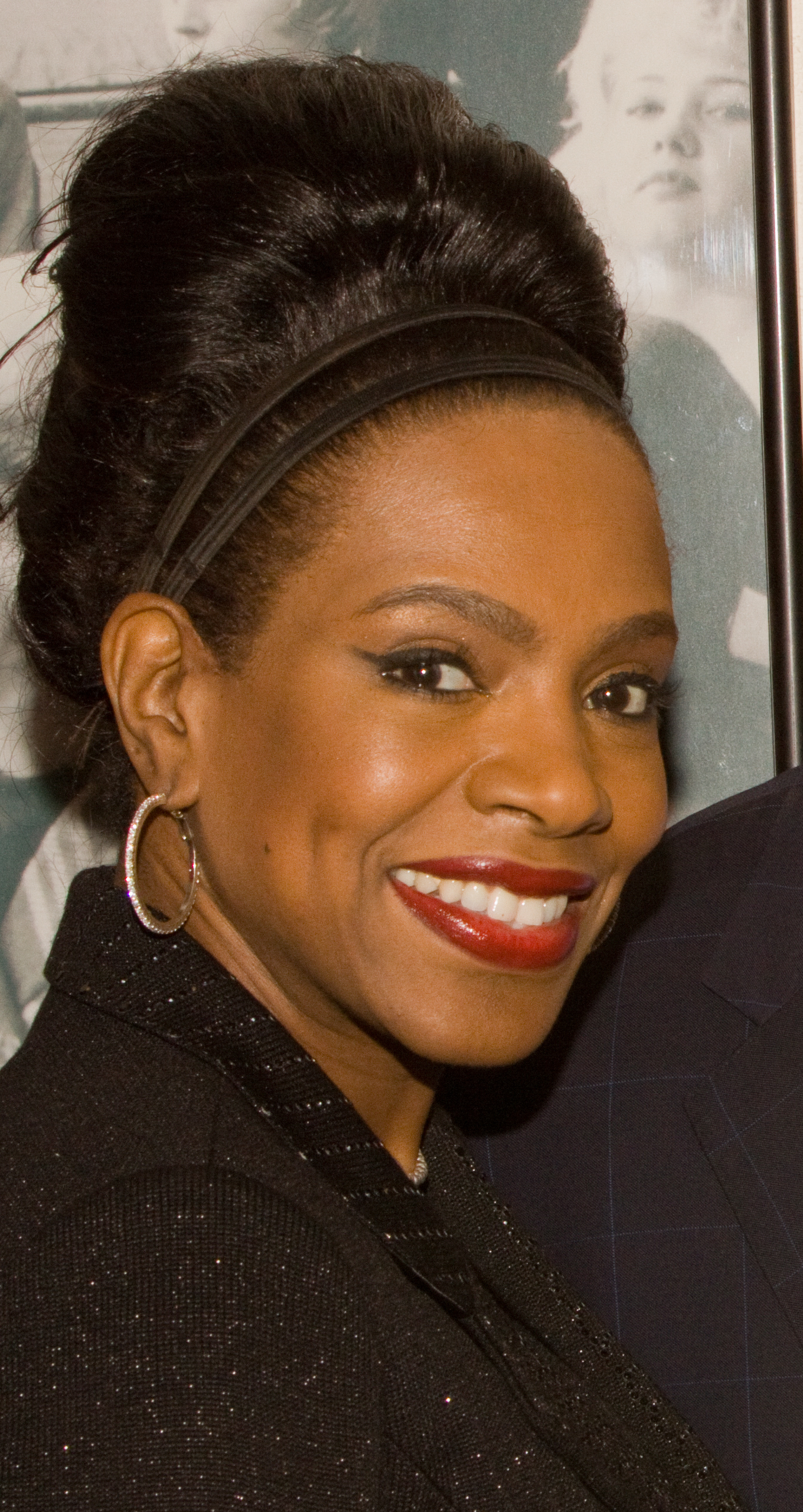
Sheryl Lee Ralph

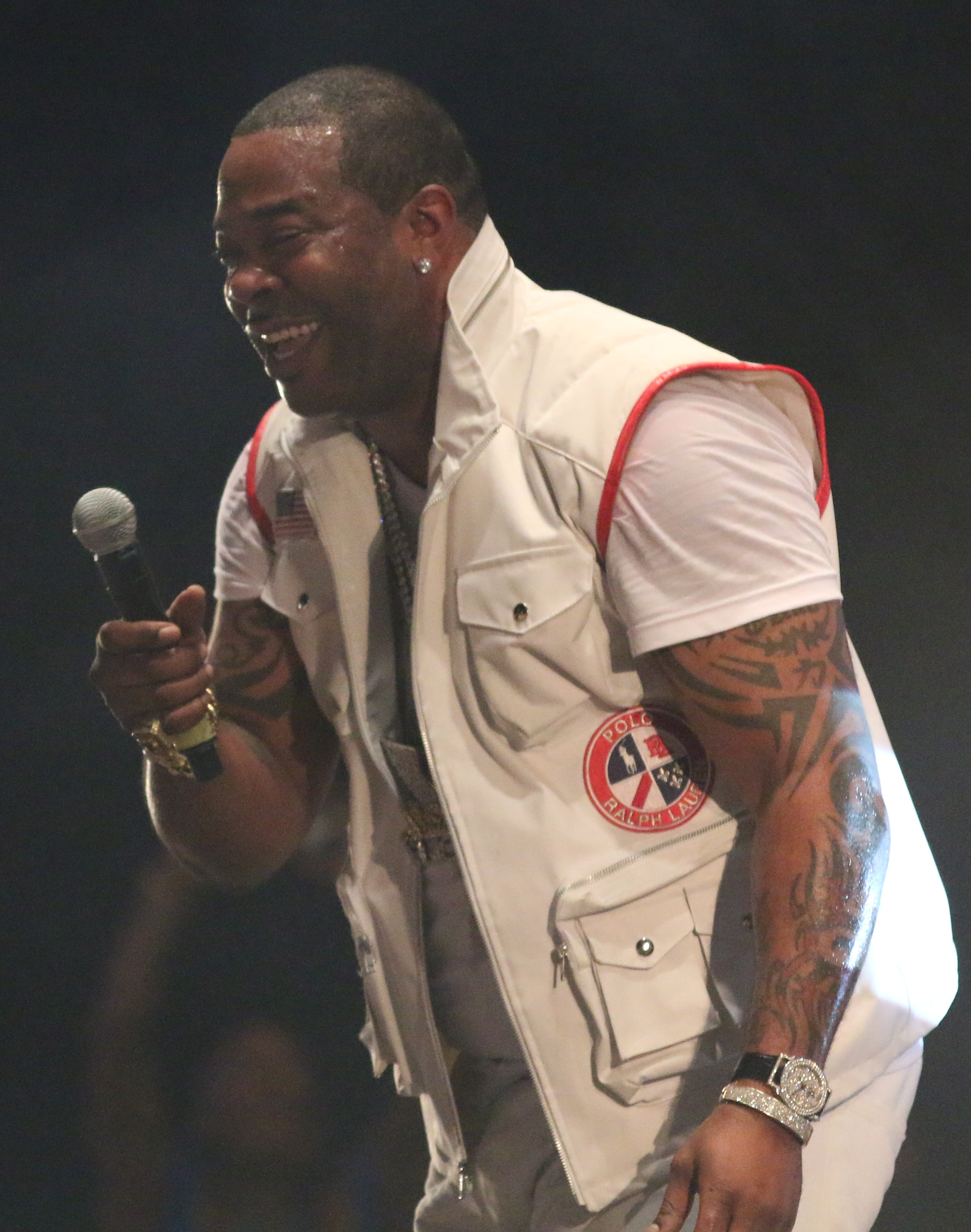
Busta Rhymes

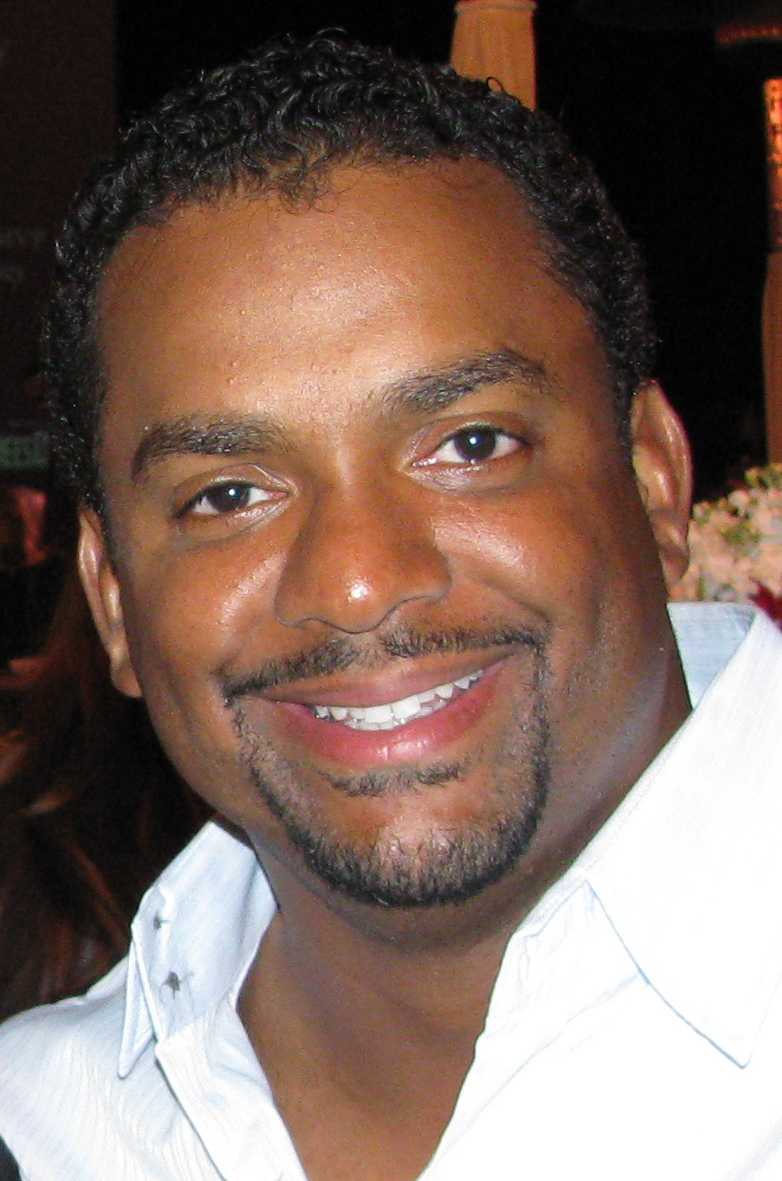
Alfonso Ribeiro

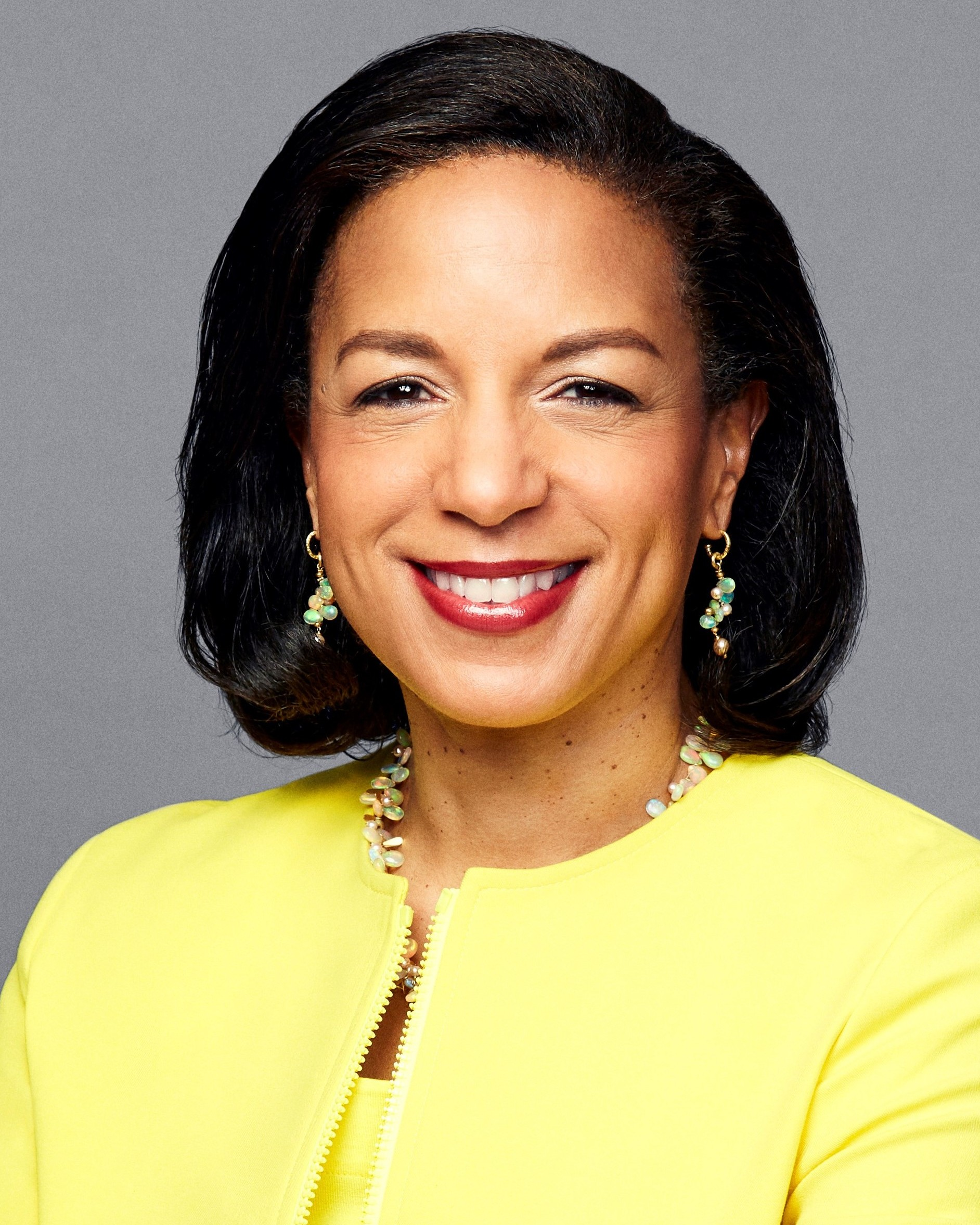
Susan Rice

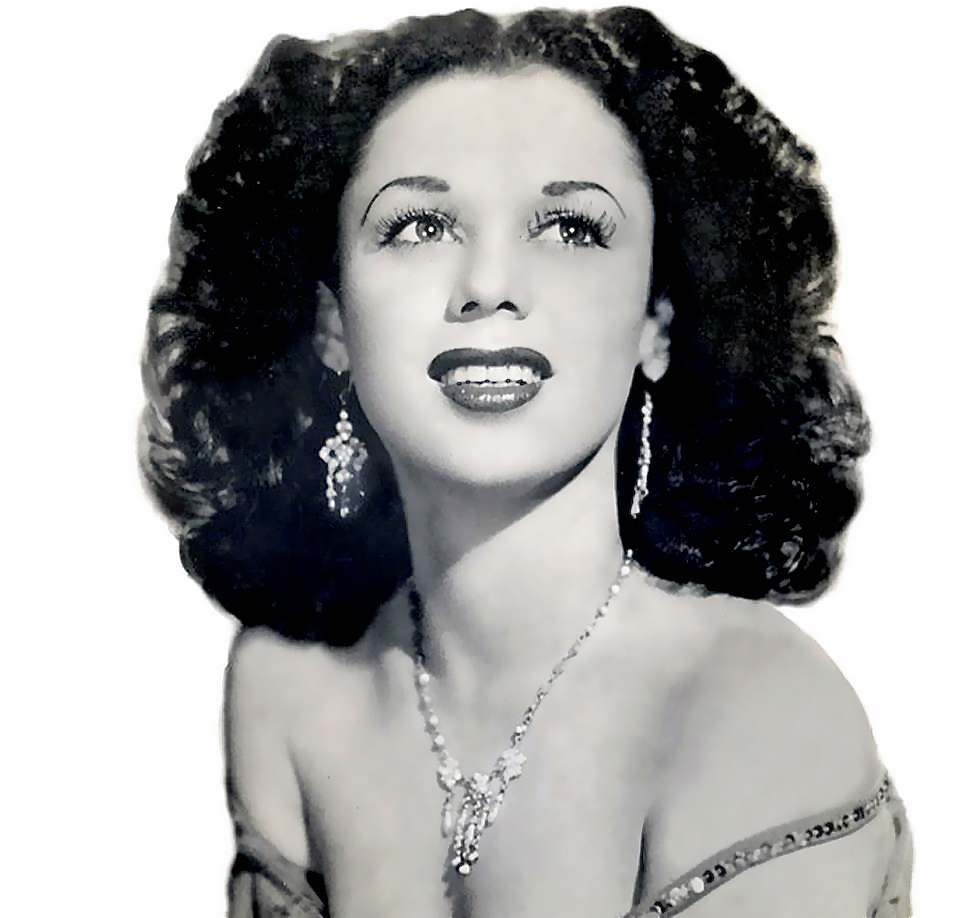
Marquita Rivera

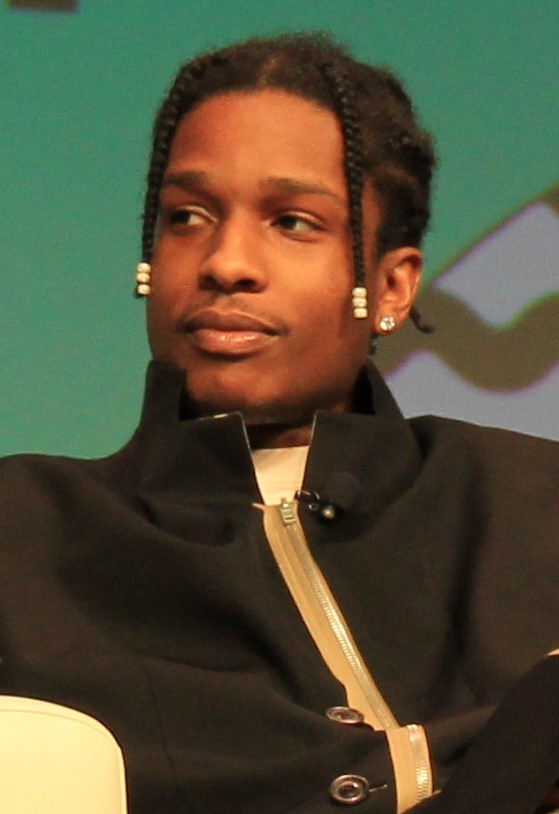
ASAP Rocky

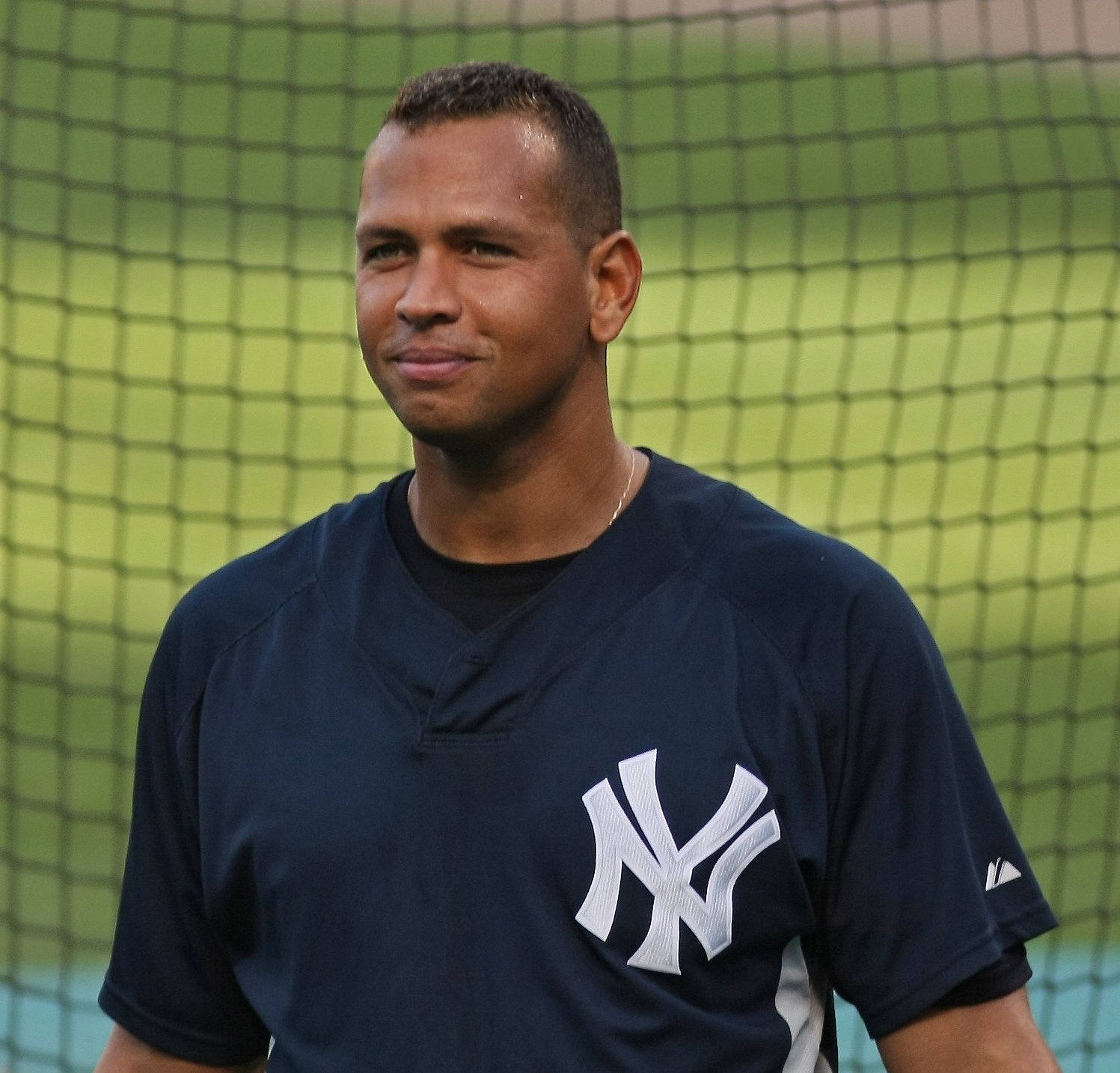
Alex Rodriguez

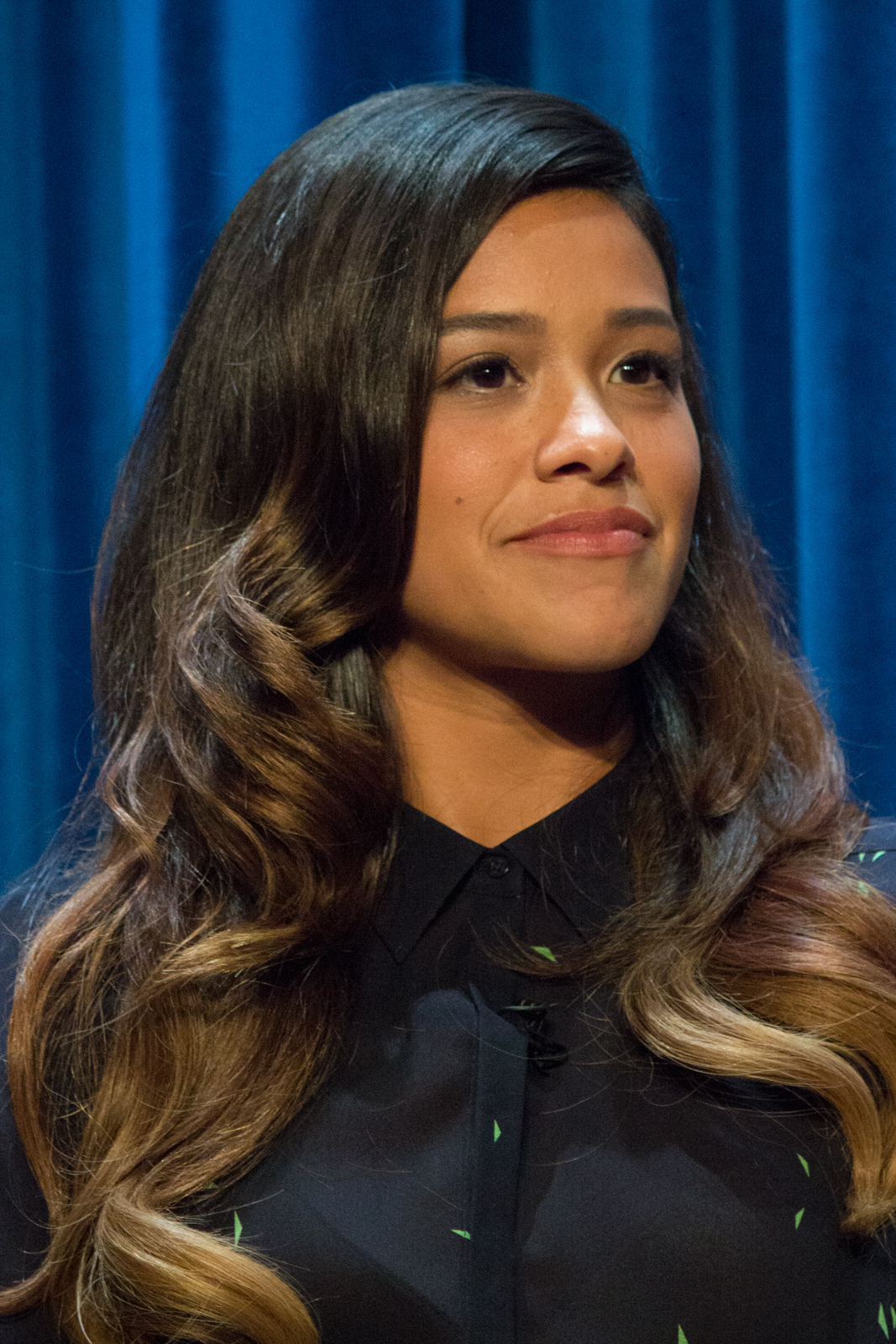
Gina Rodriguez

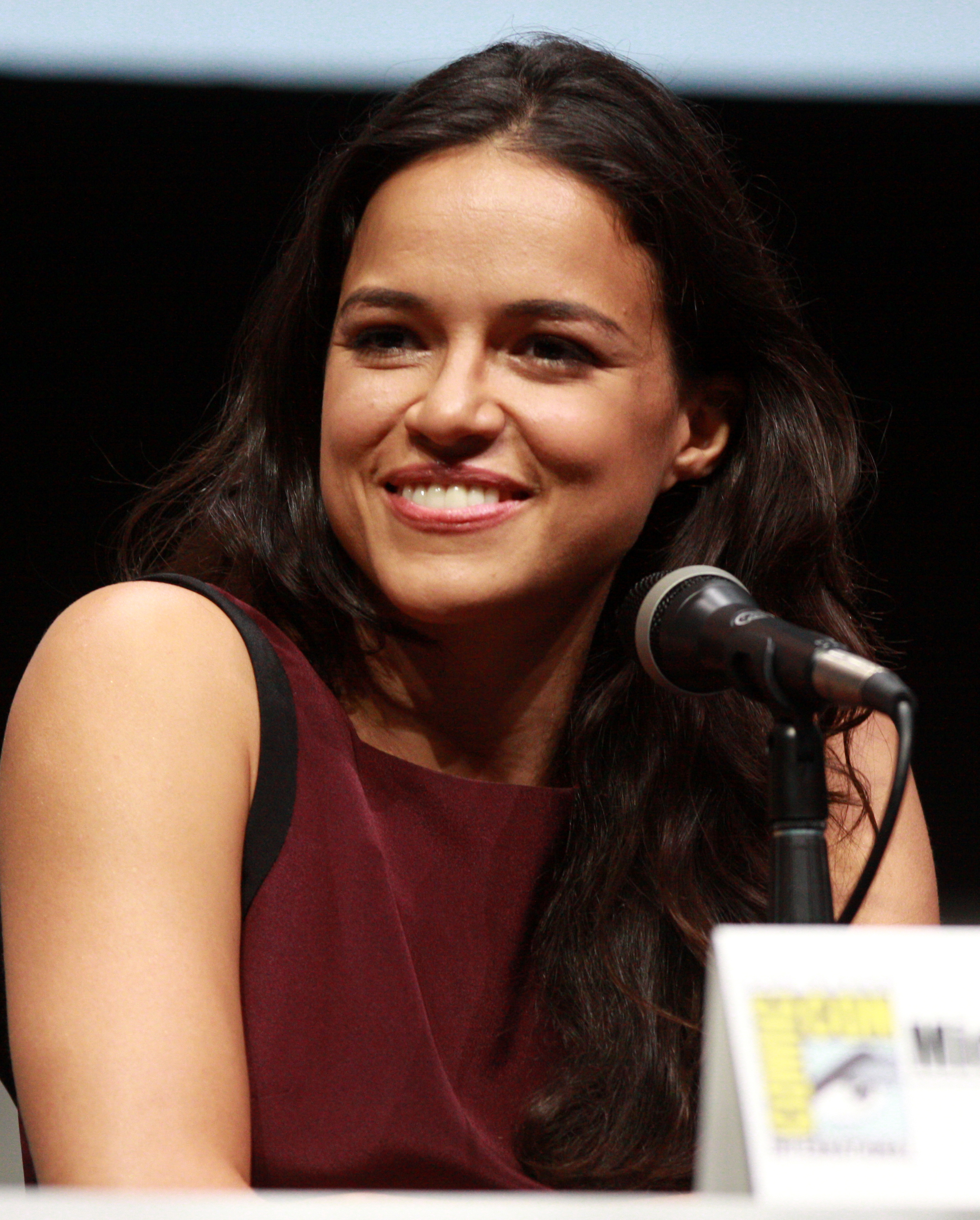
Michelle Rodriguez

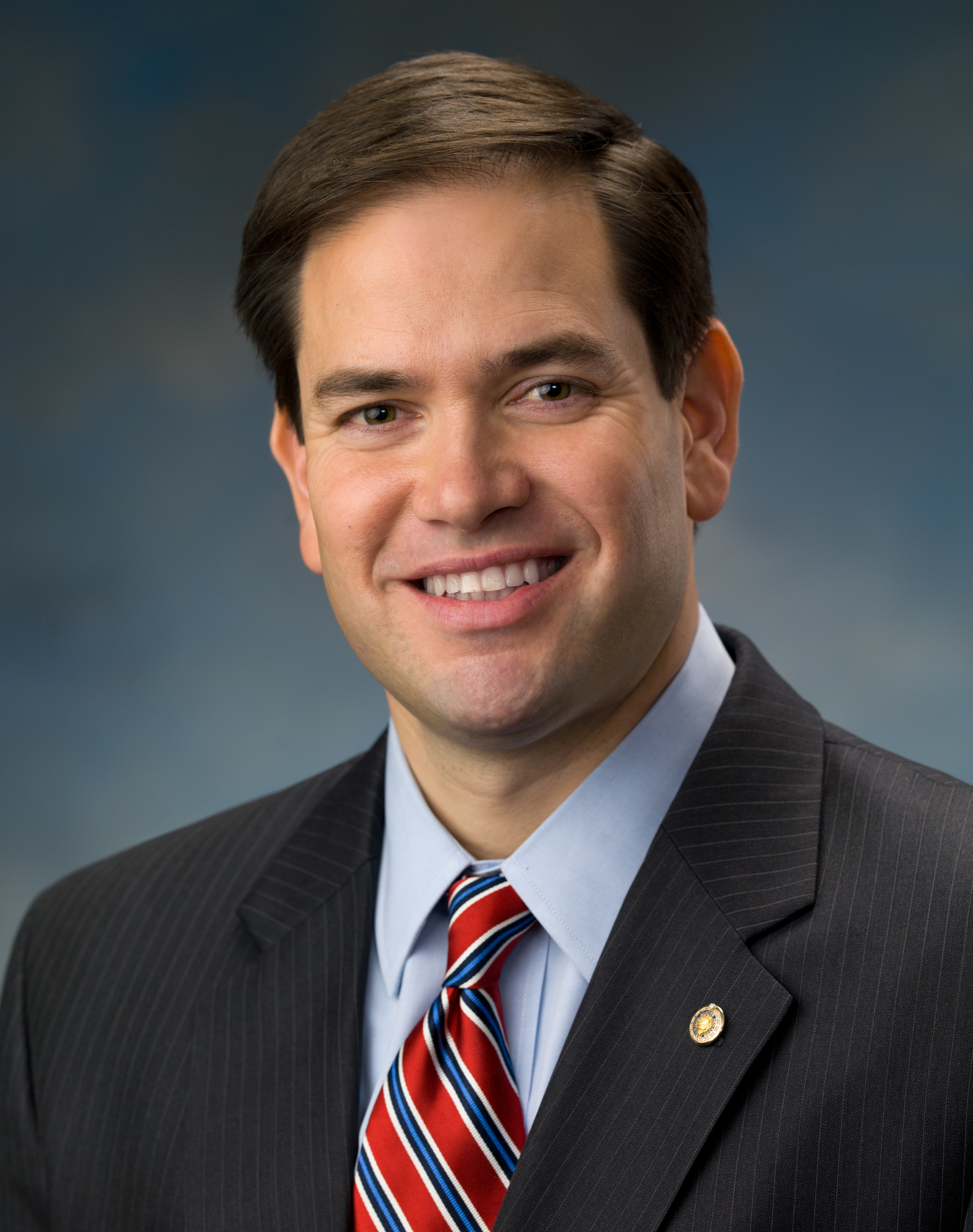
Marco Rubio

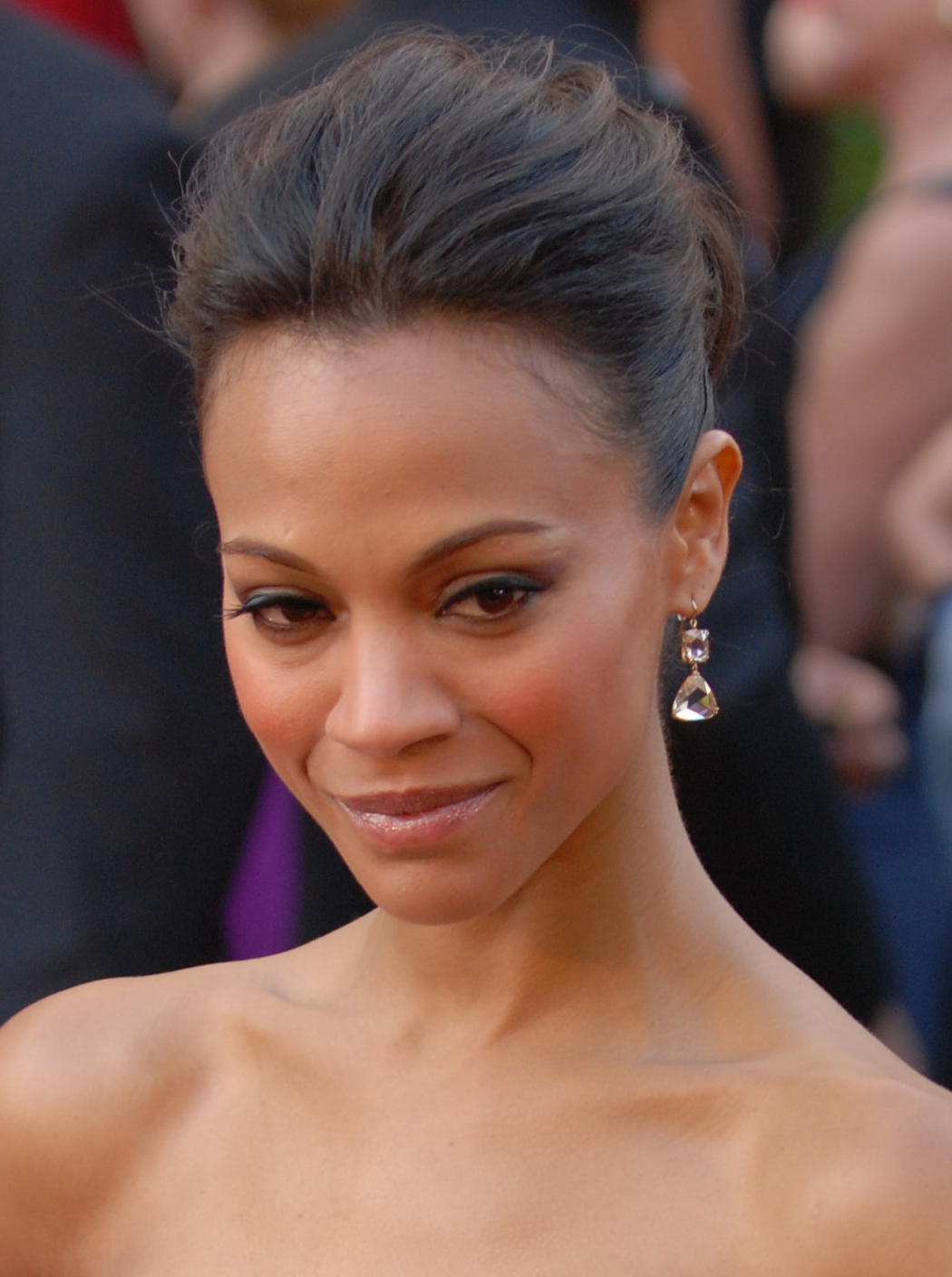
Zoe Saldaña

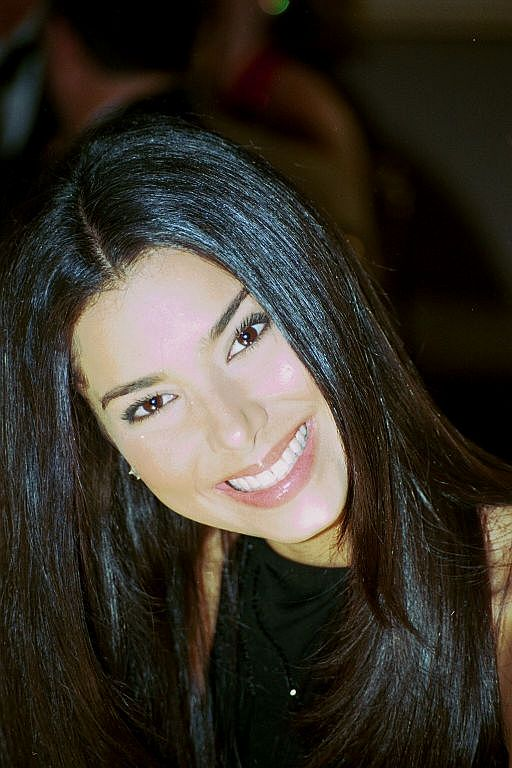
Roselyn Sánchez

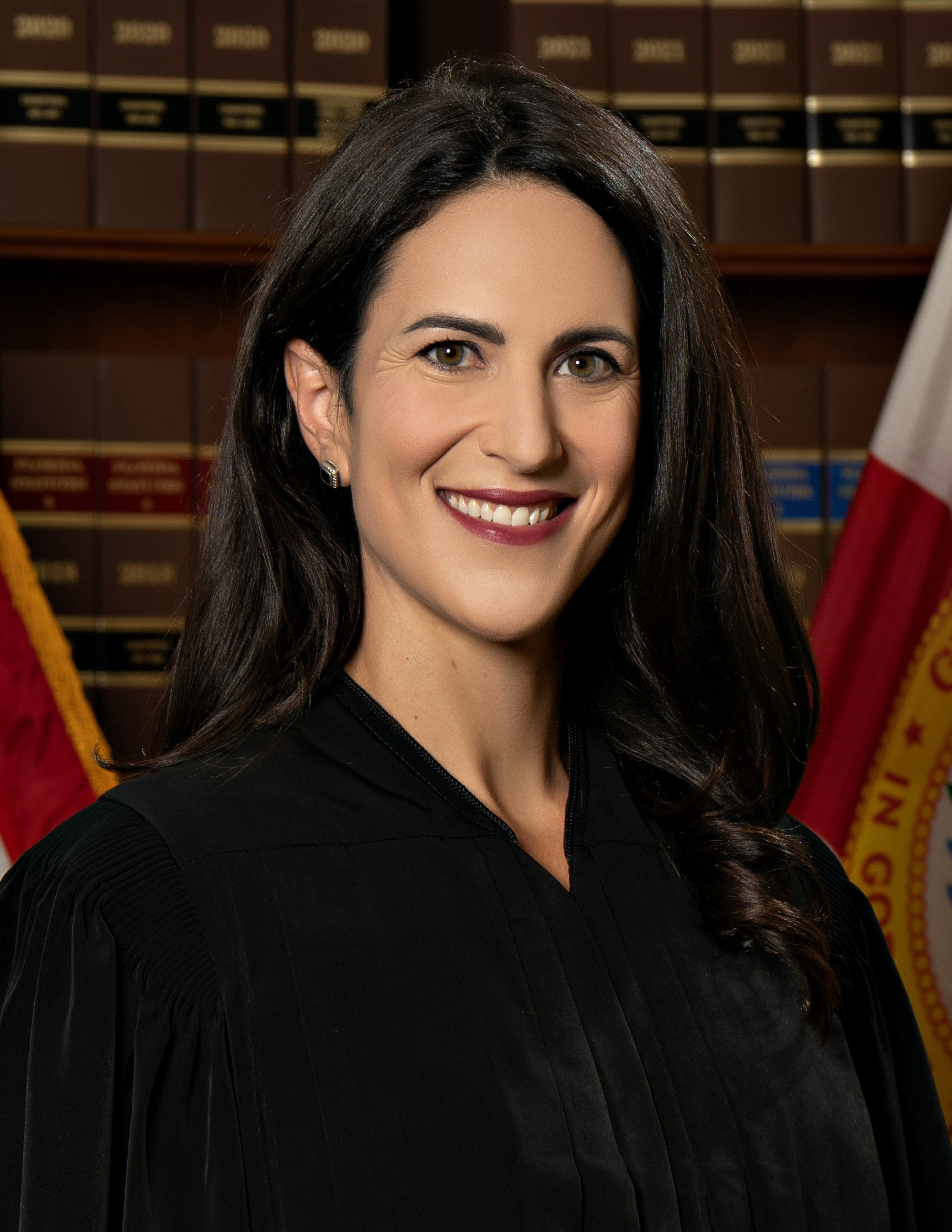
Meredith Sasso

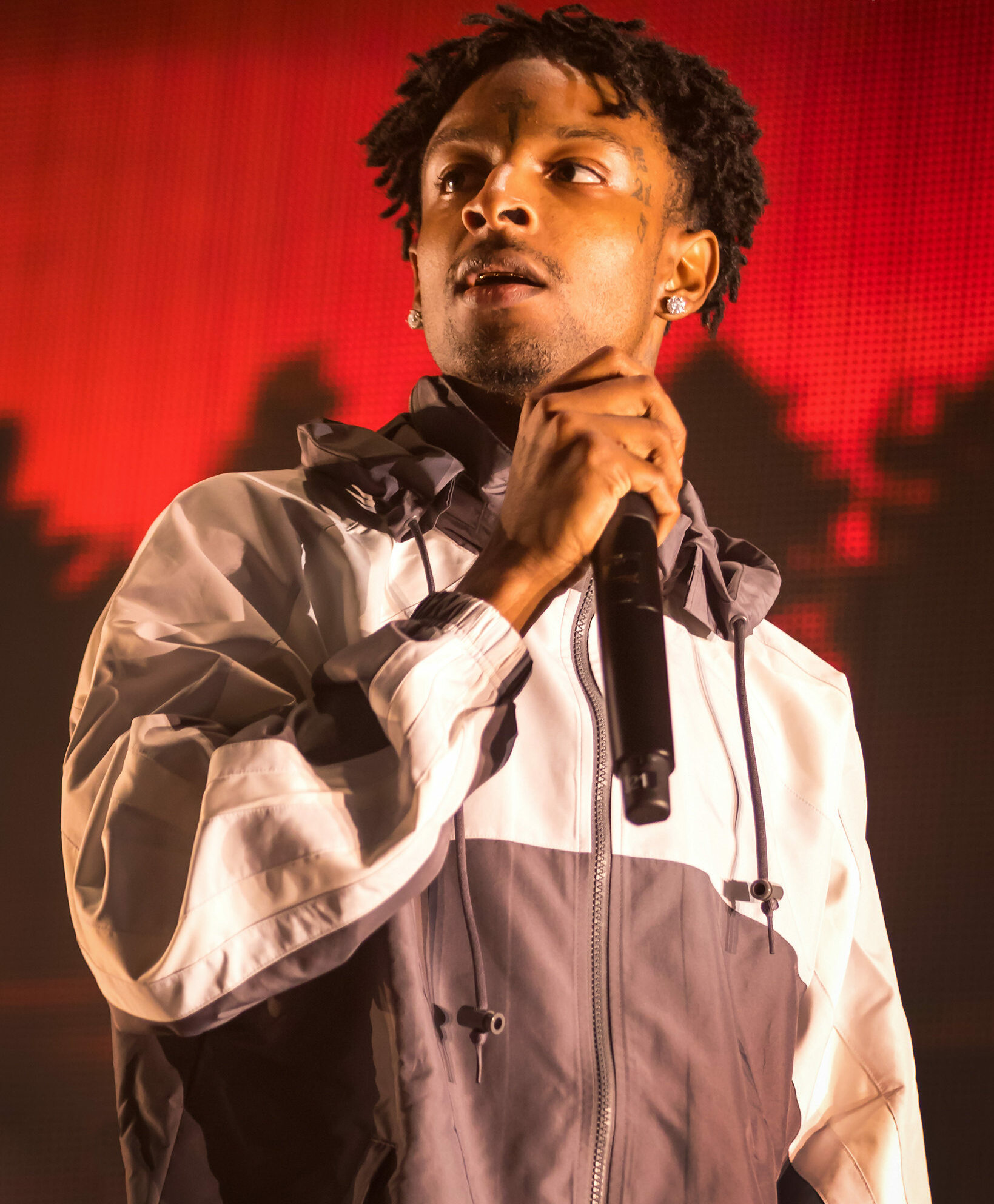
21 Savage

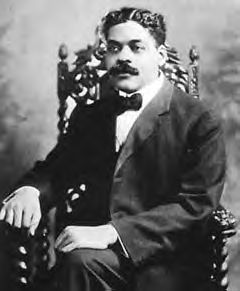
Arturo Alfonso Schomburg

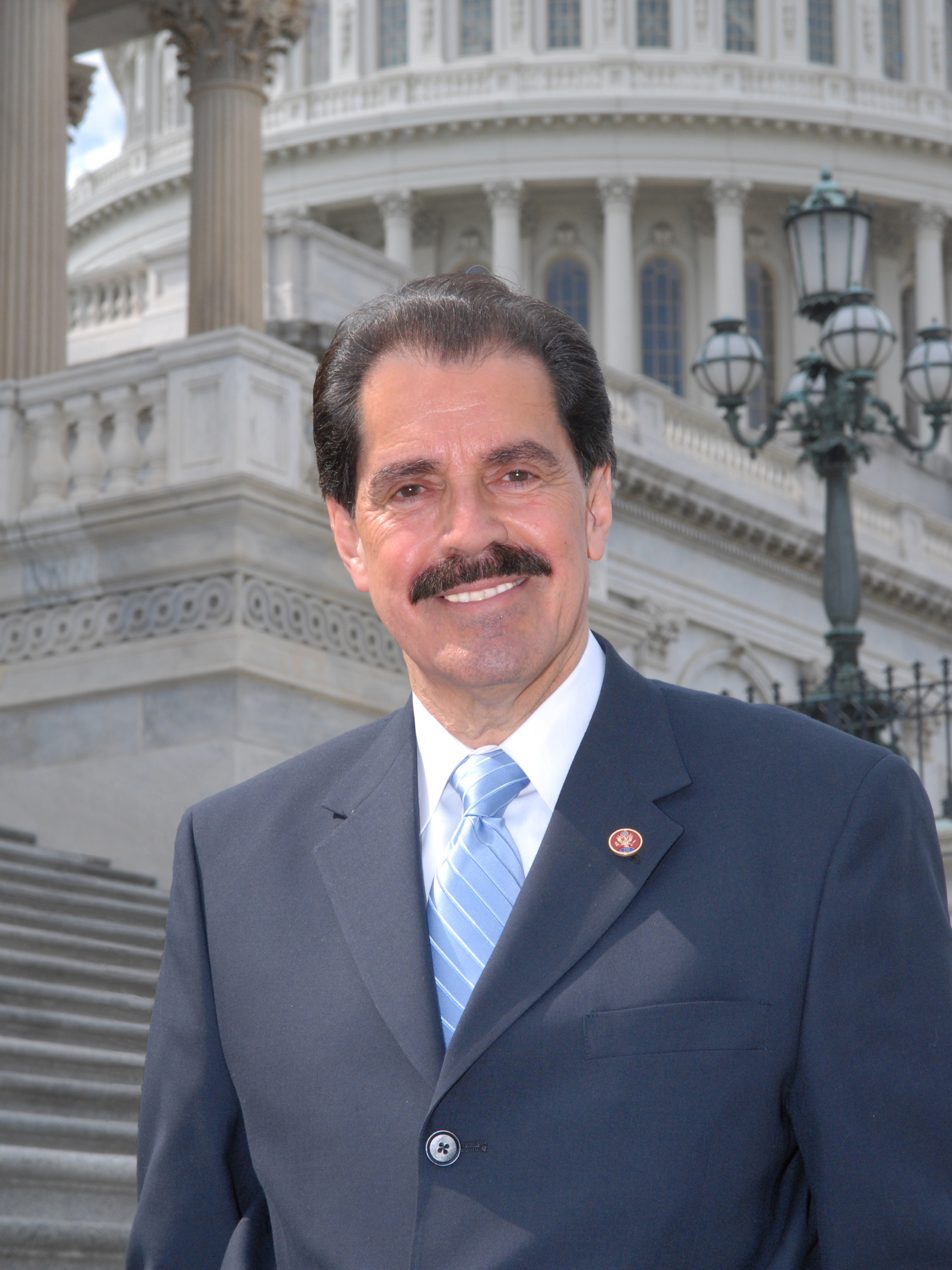
Jose Serrano

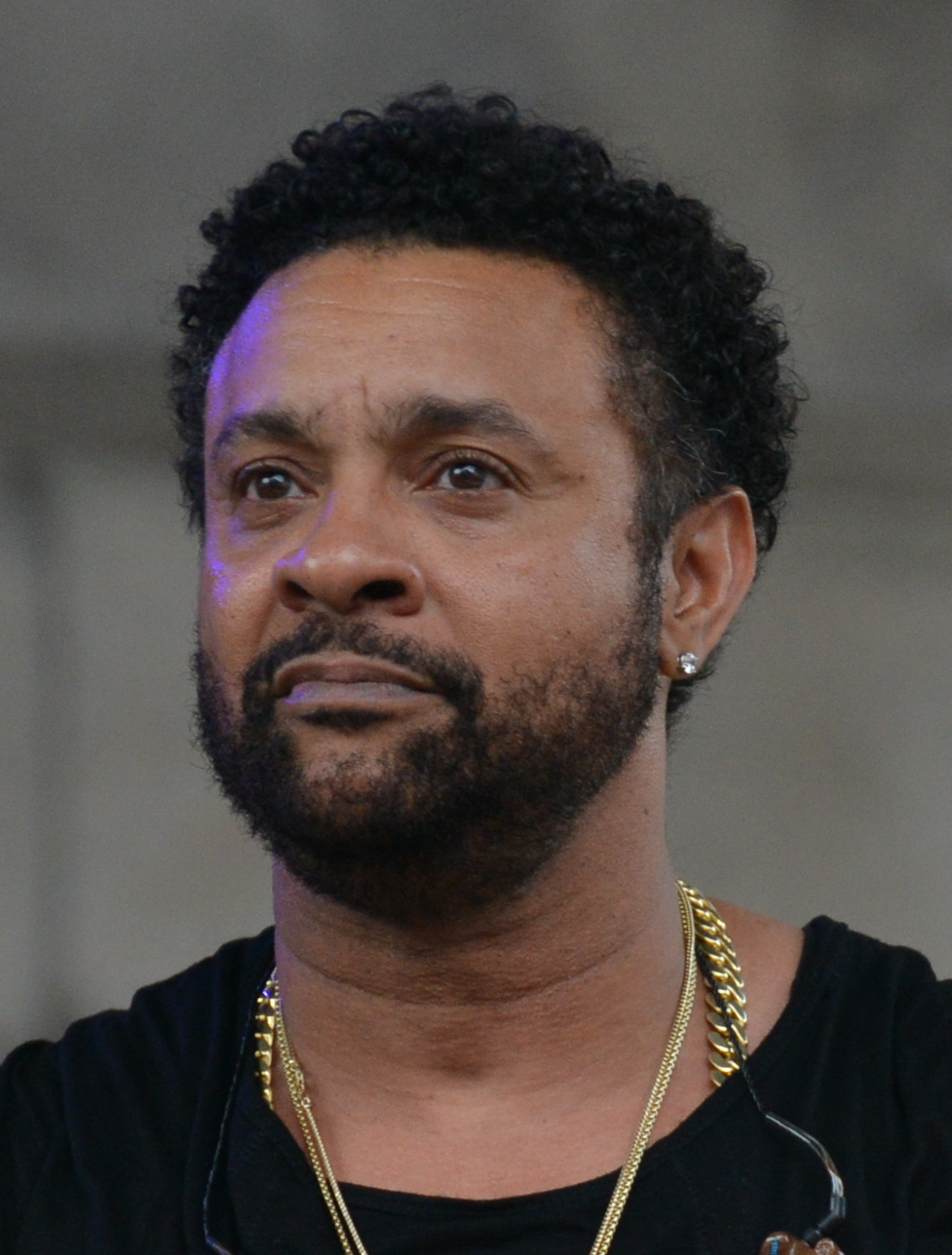
Shaggy

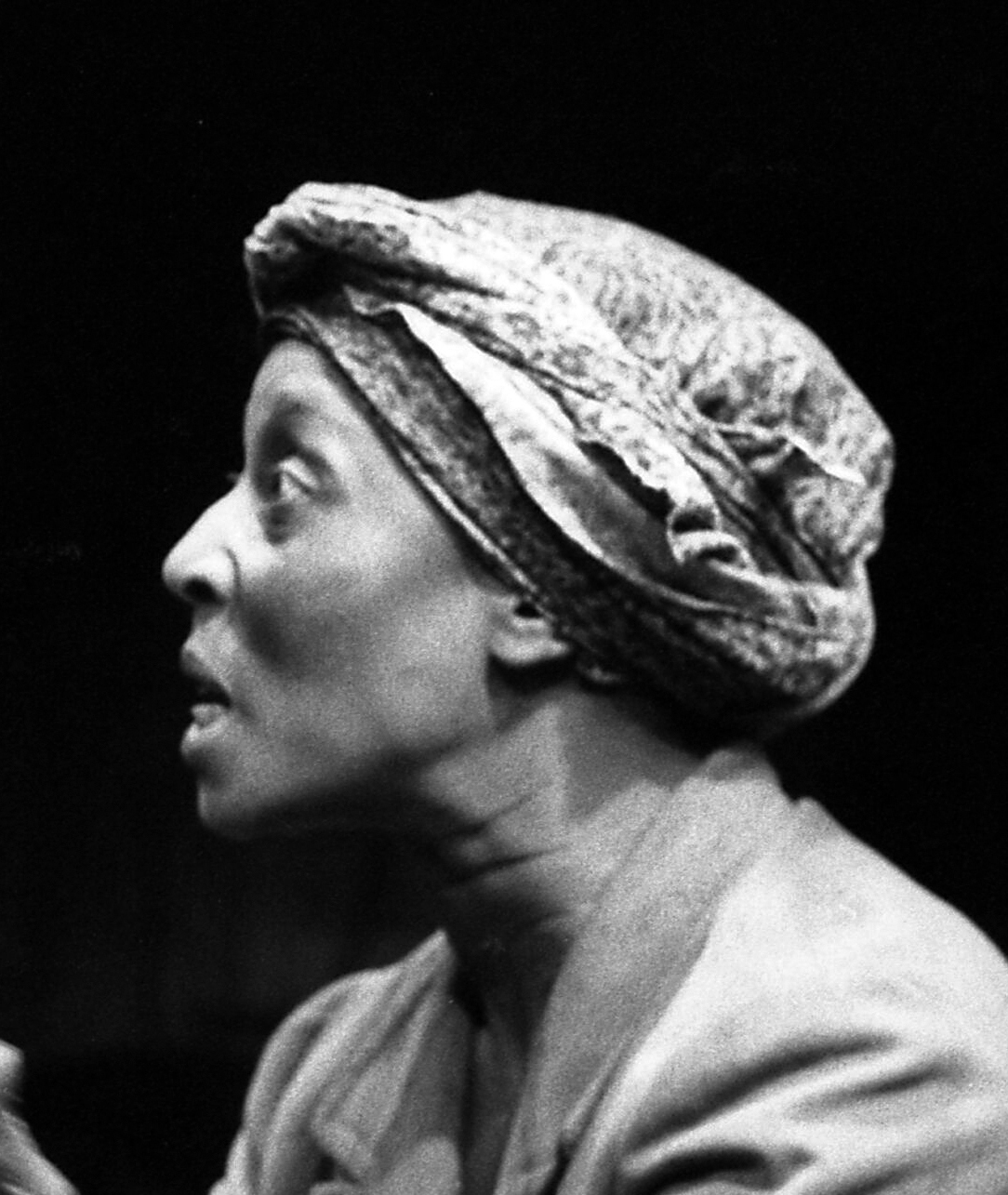
Madge Sinclair

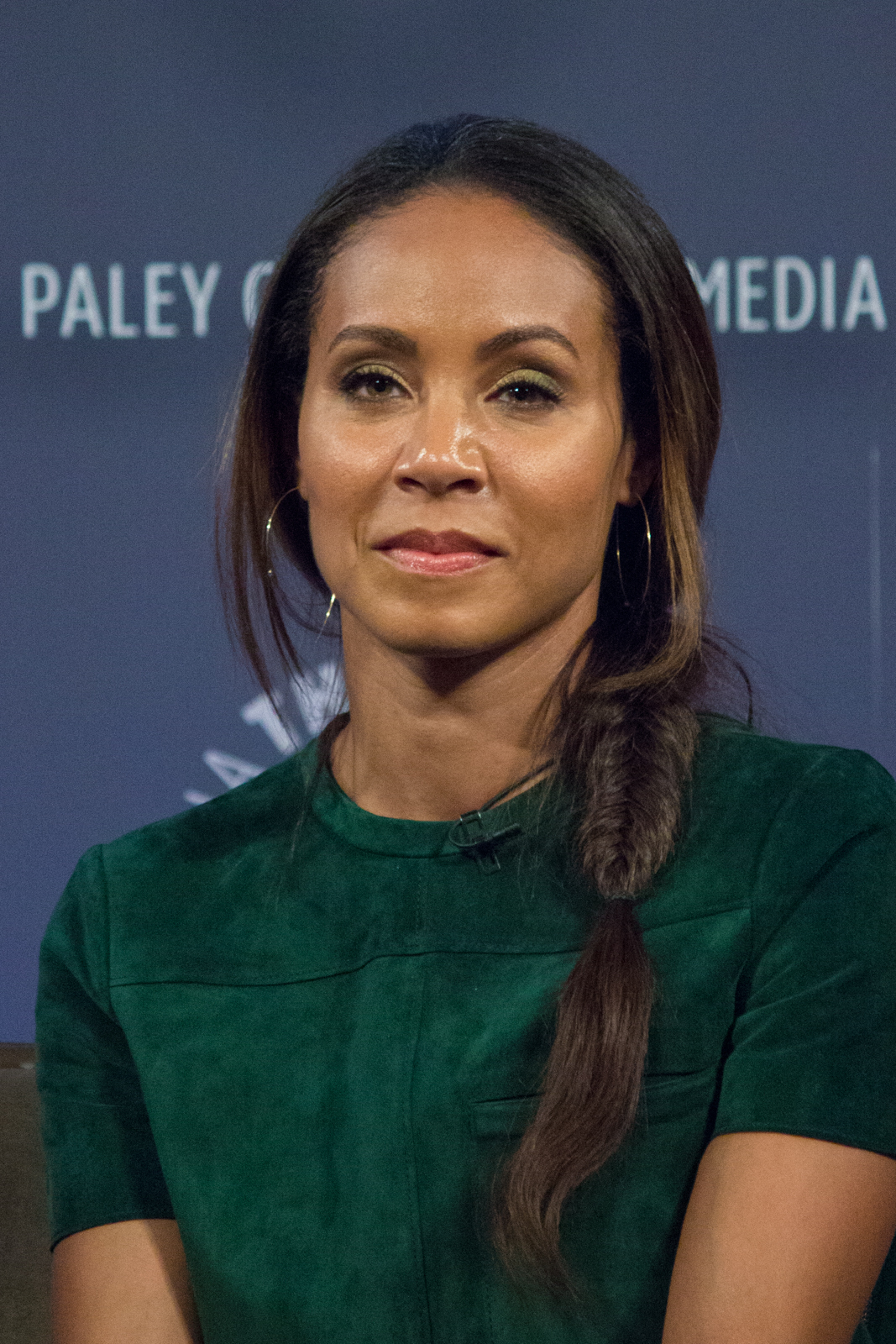
Jada Pinkett Smith

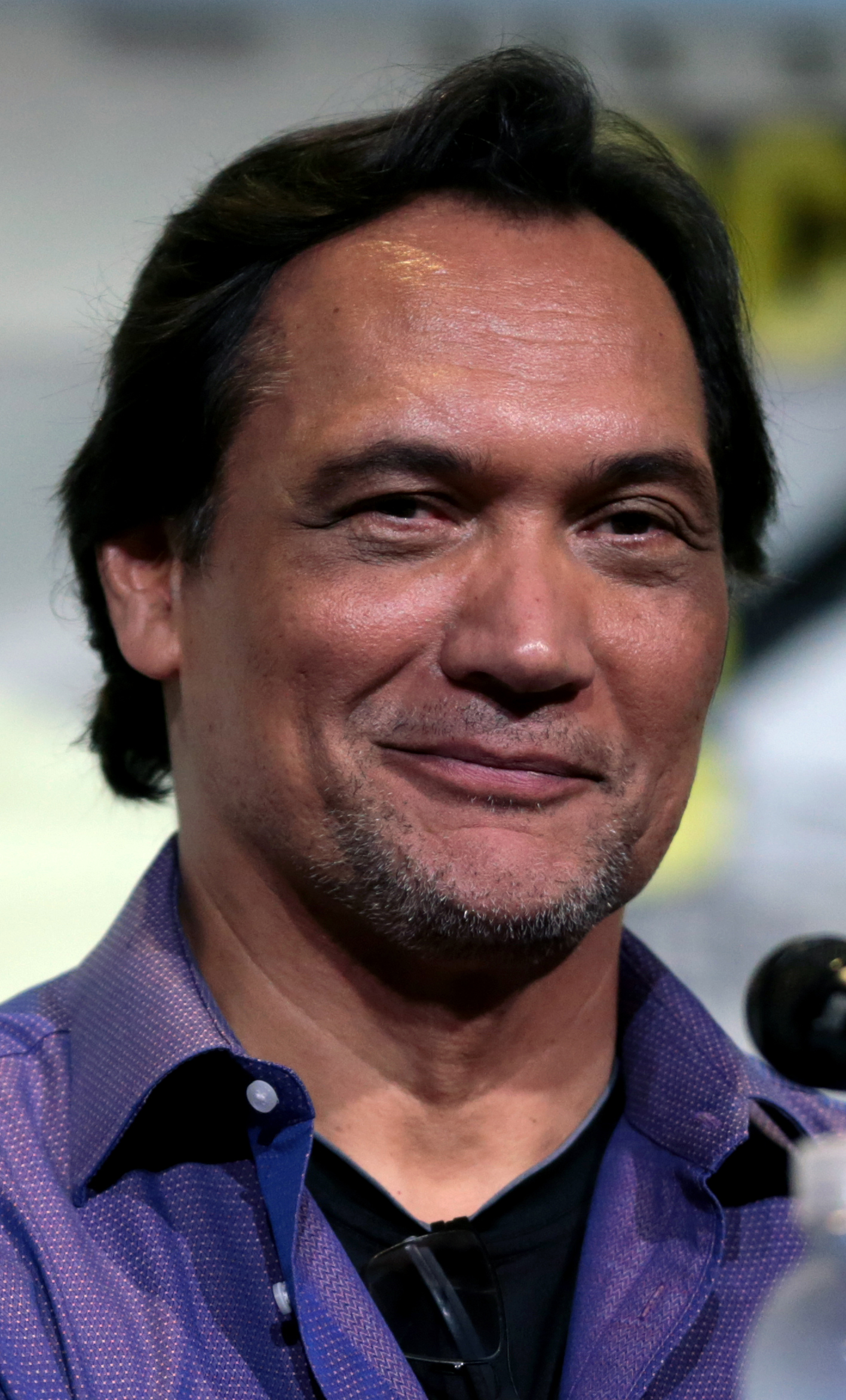
Jimmy Smits

Sneako

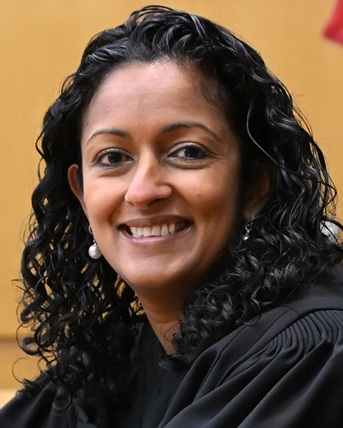
Sparkle L. Sooknanan

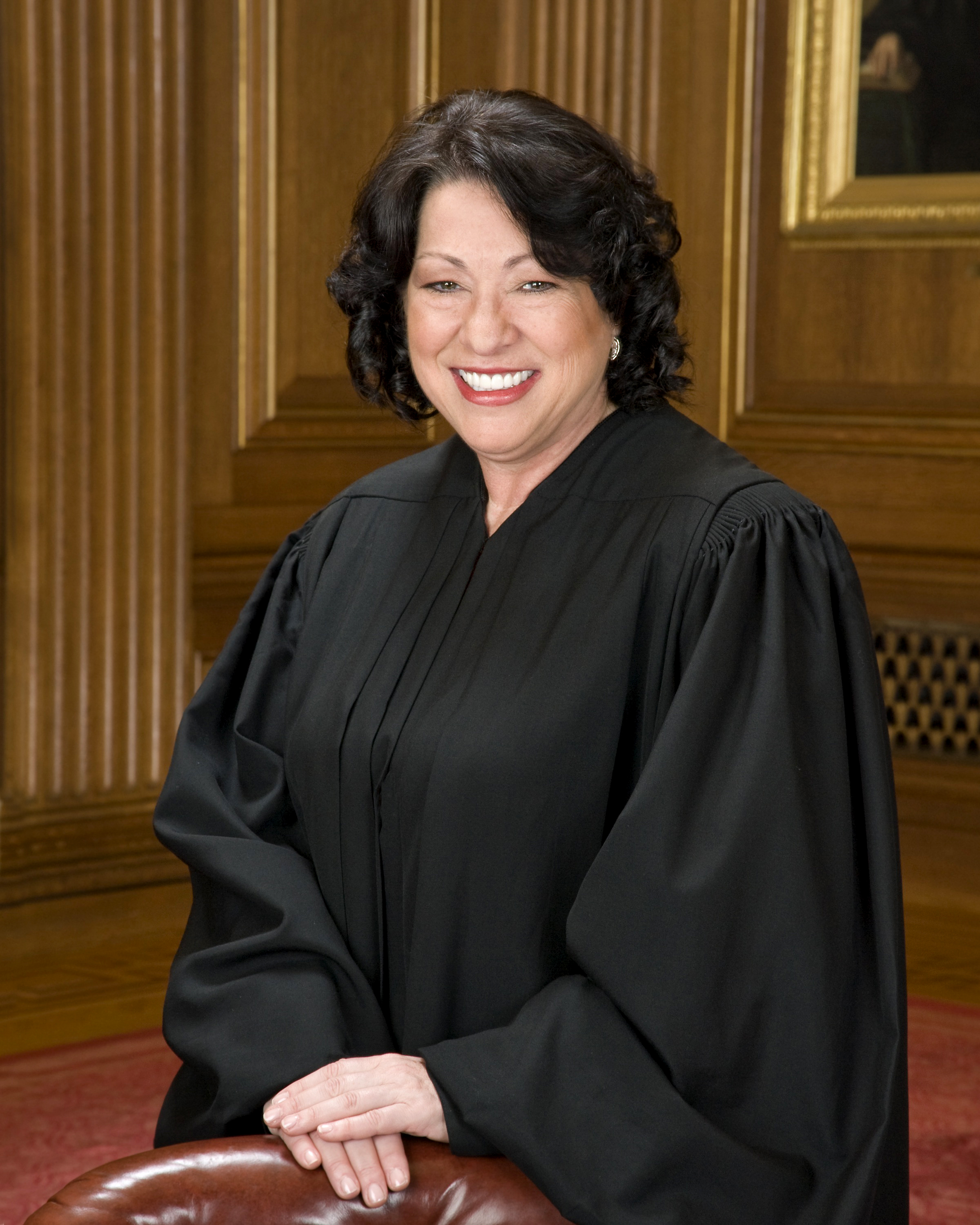
Sonia Sotomayor

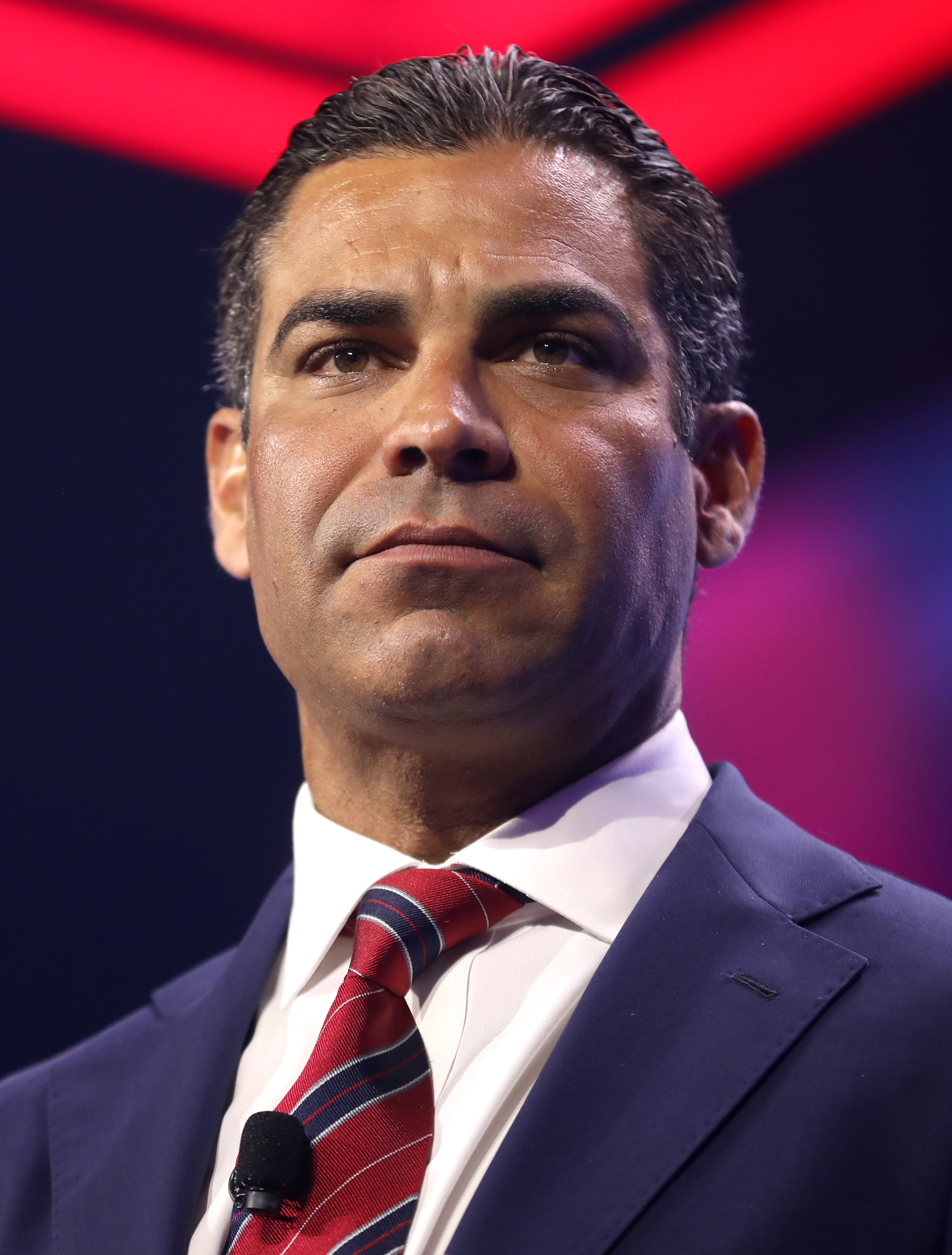
Francis Suarez

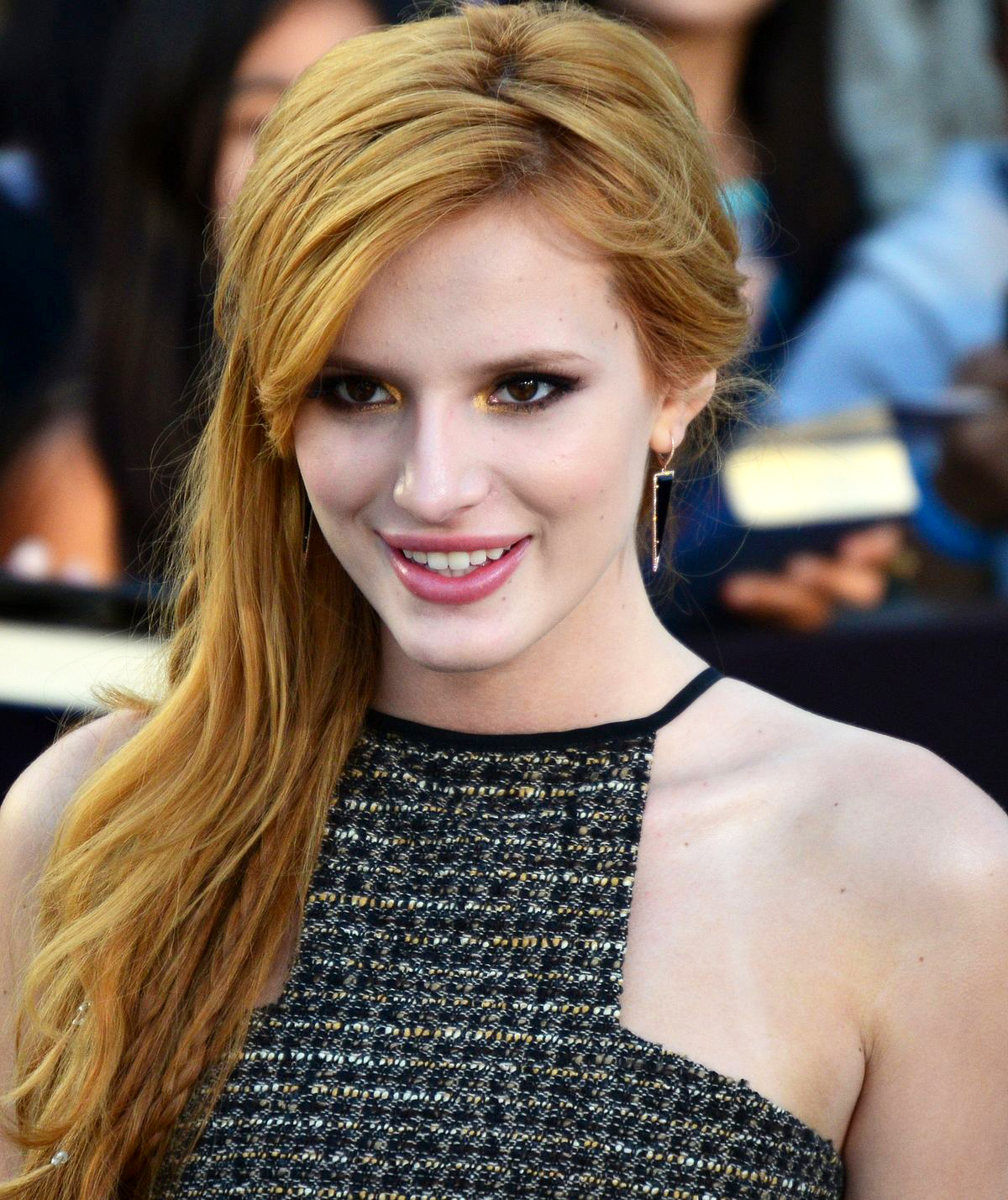
Bella Thorne

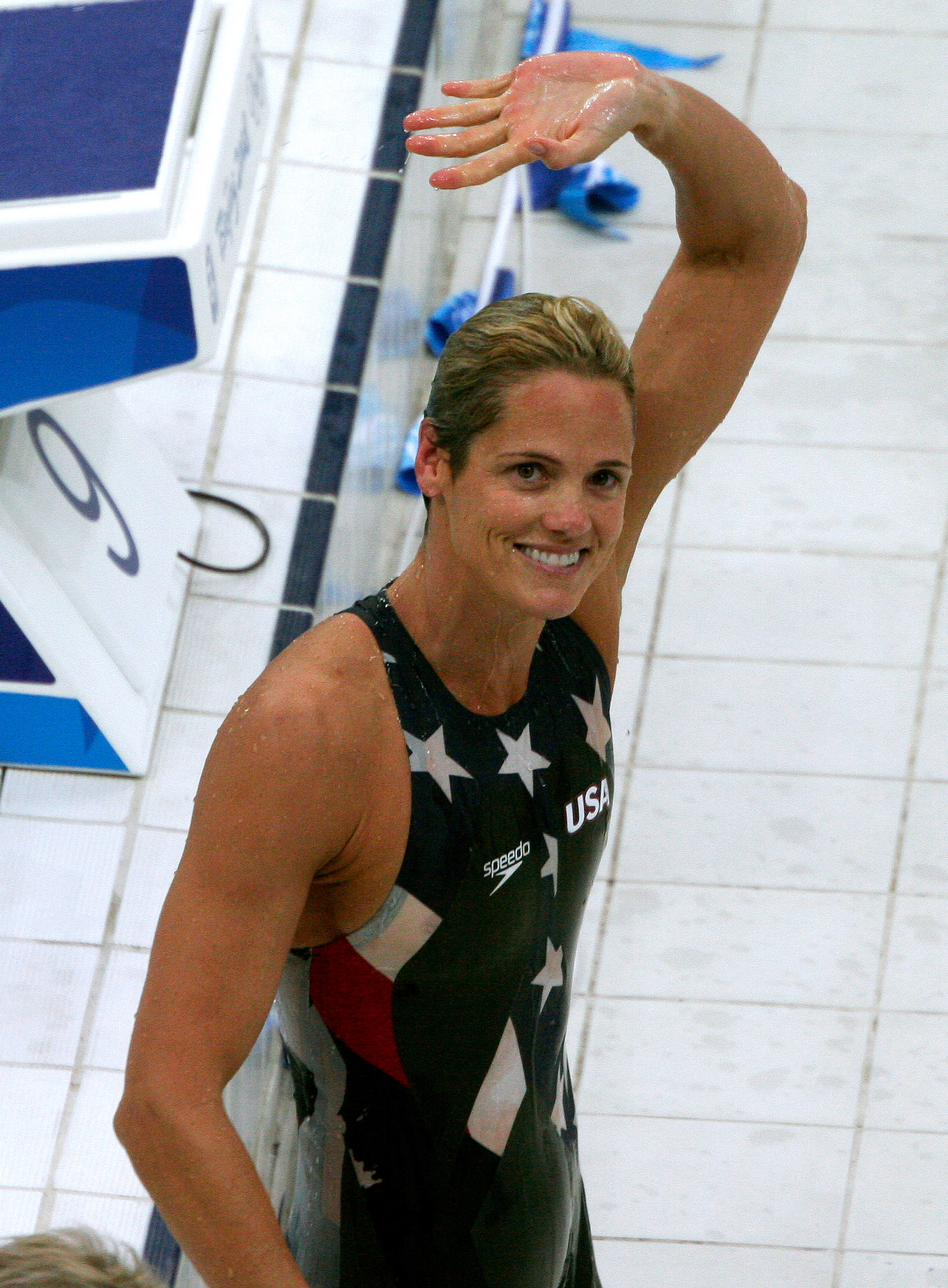
Dara Torres

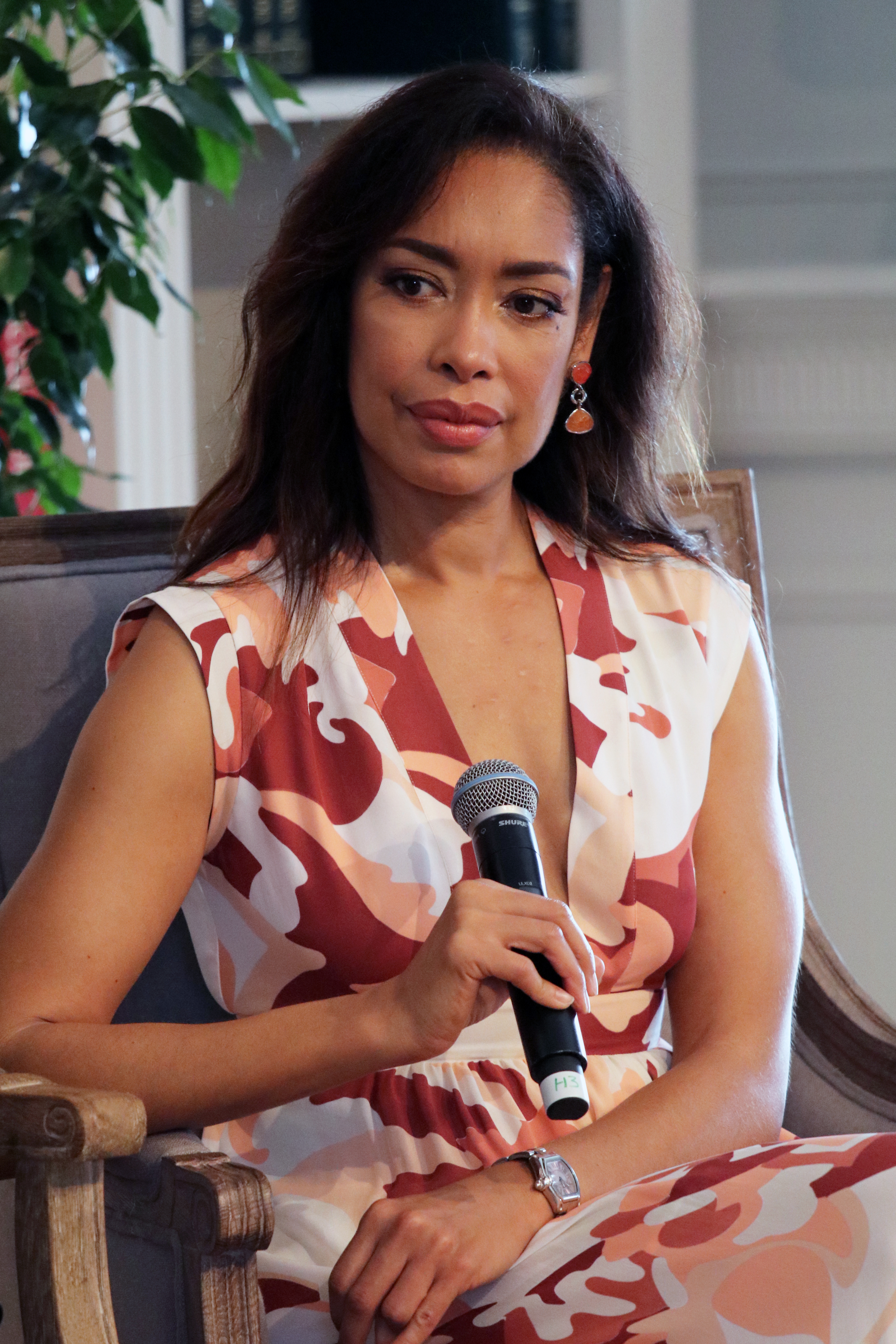
Gina Torres

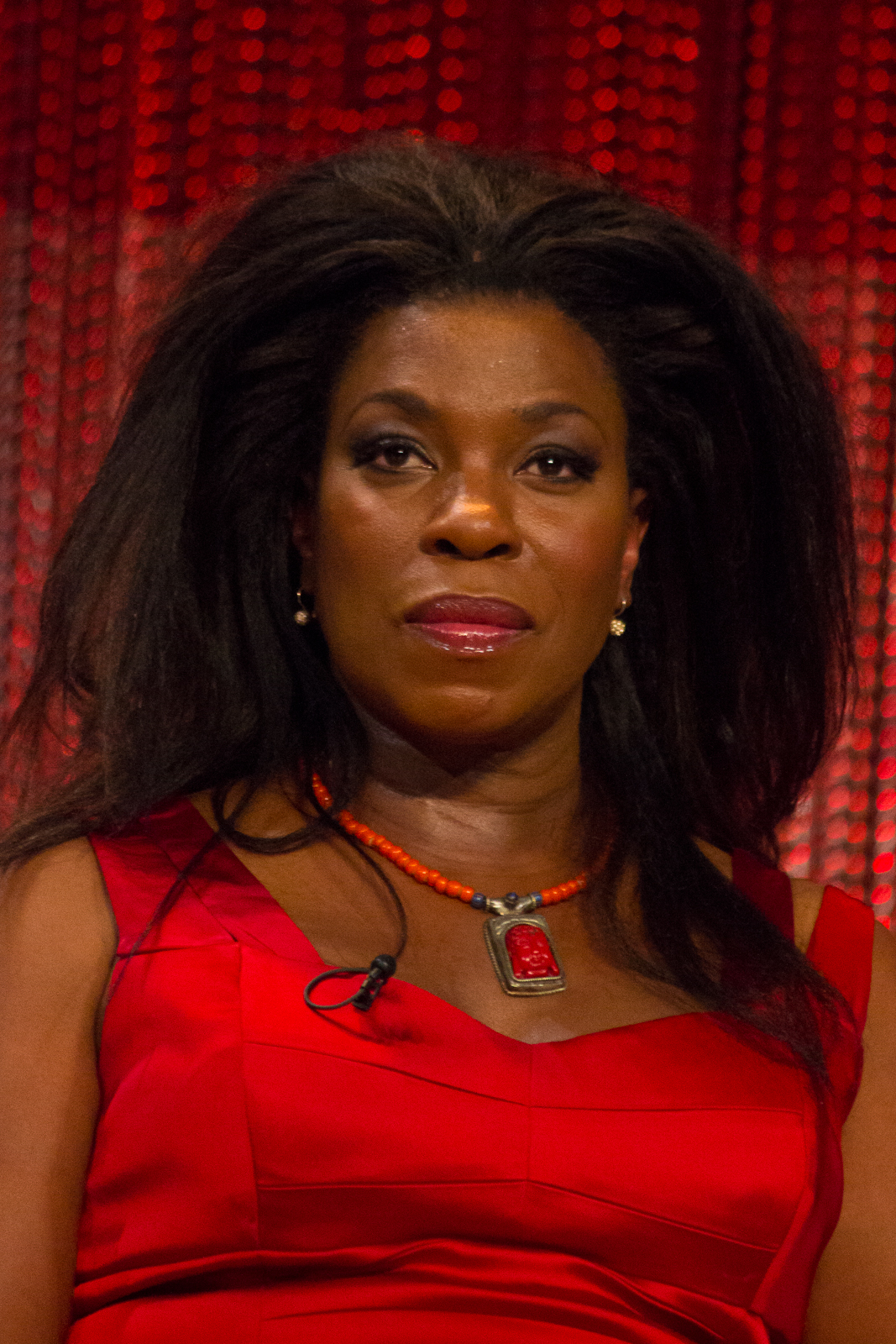
Lorraine Toussaint

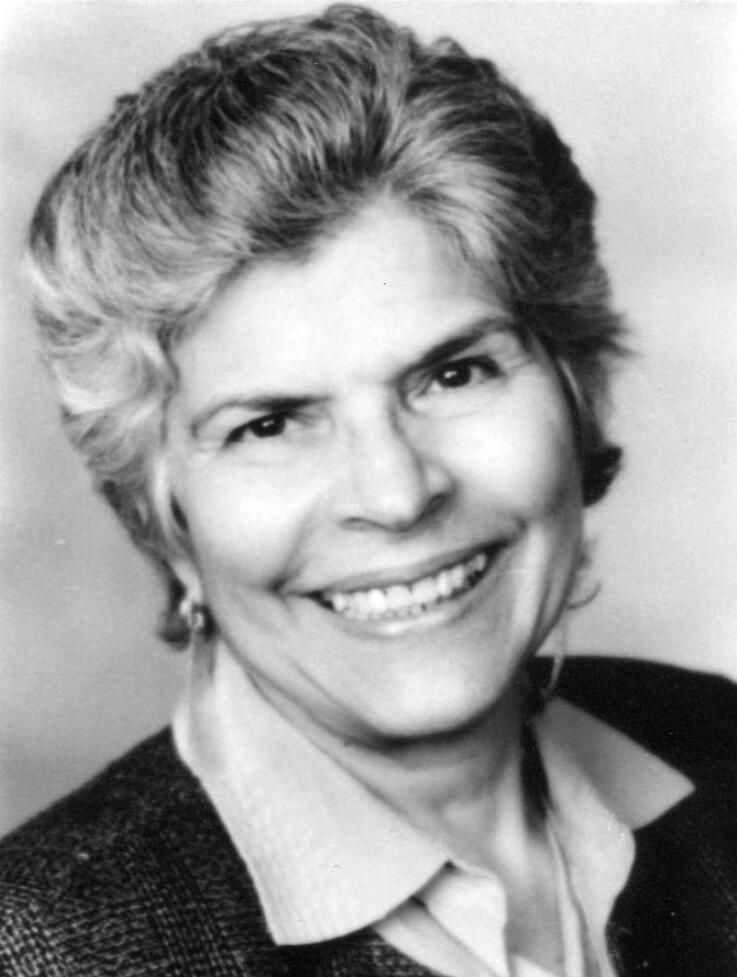
Helen Rodríguez Trías

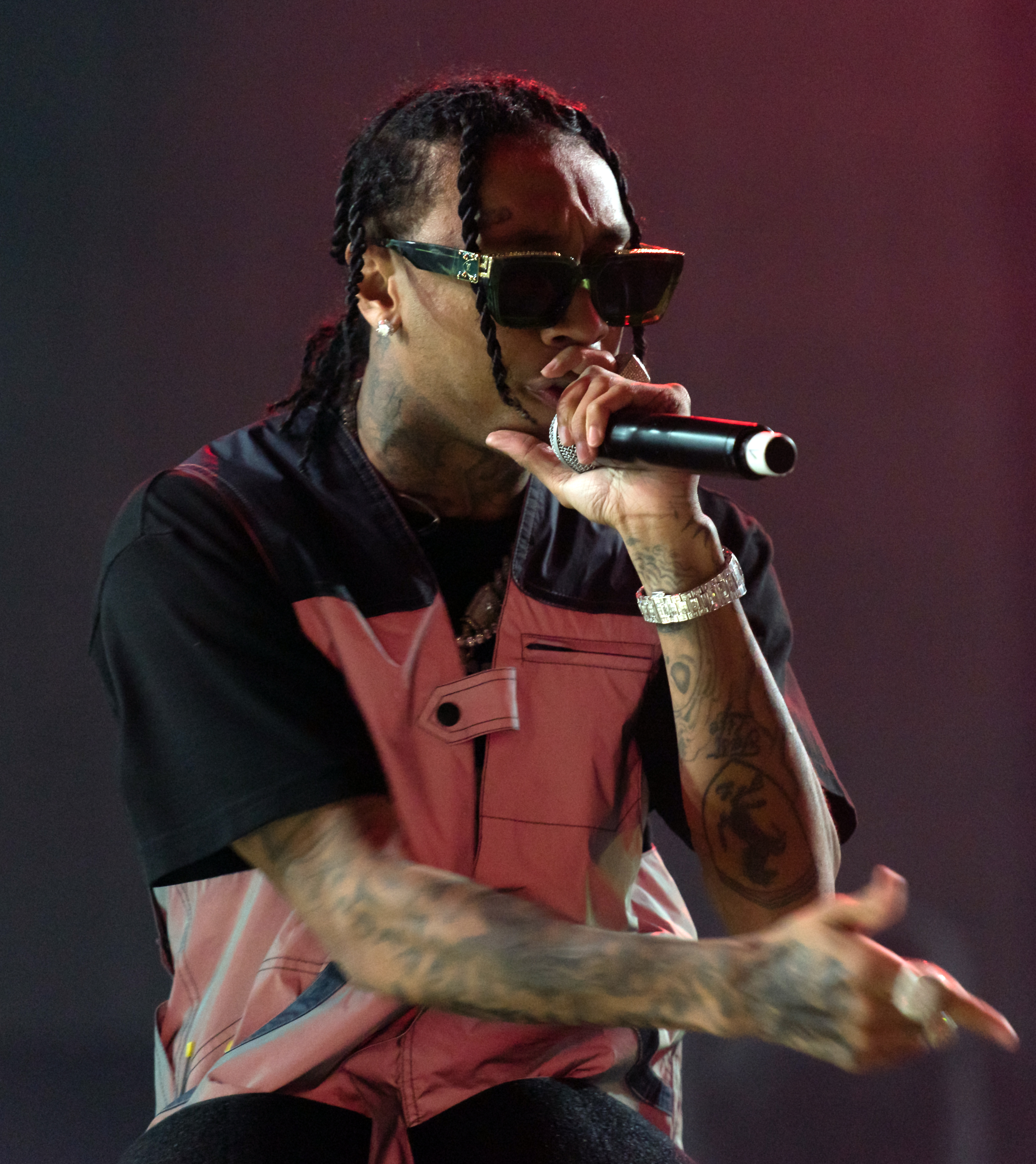
Tyga

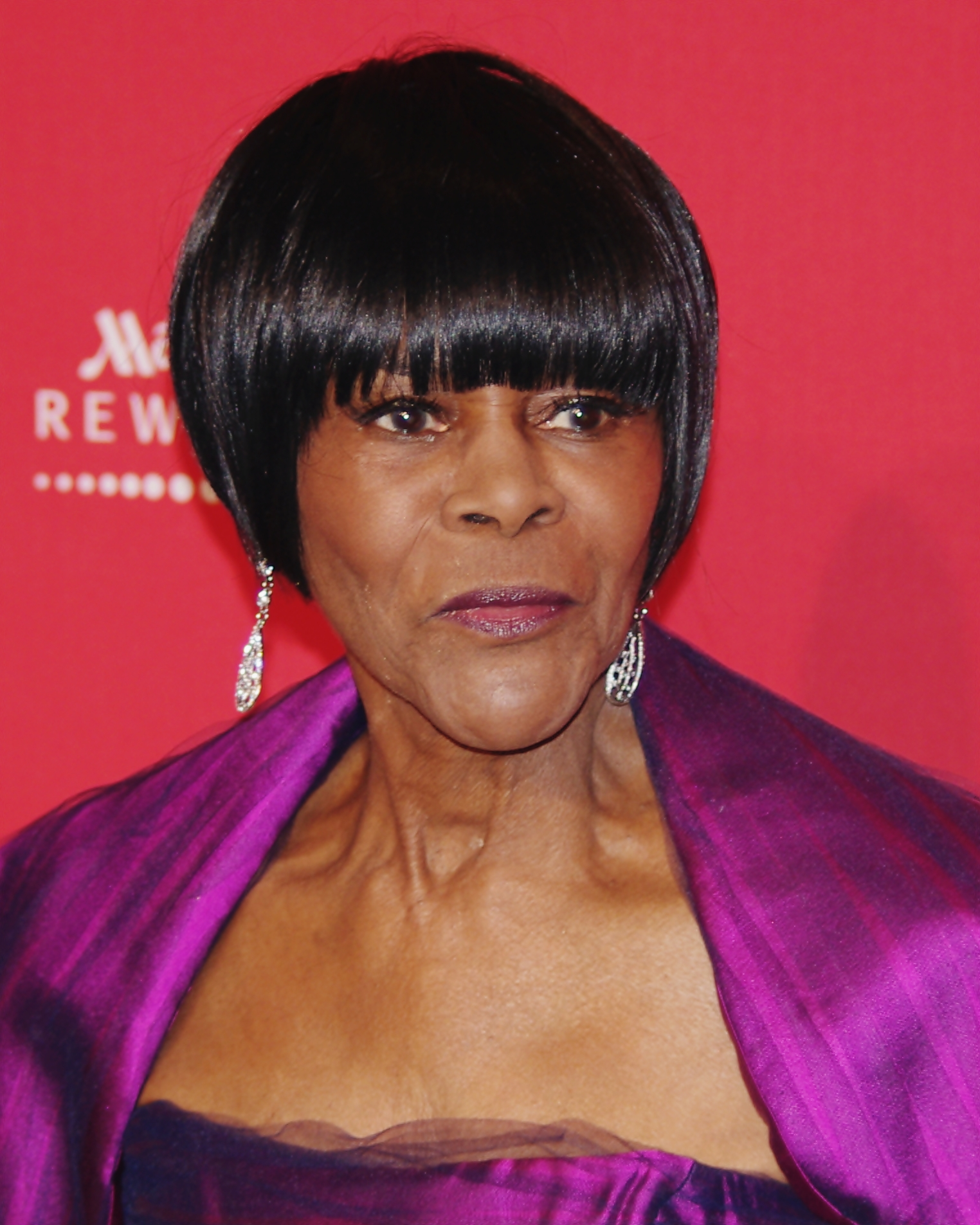
Cicely Tyson

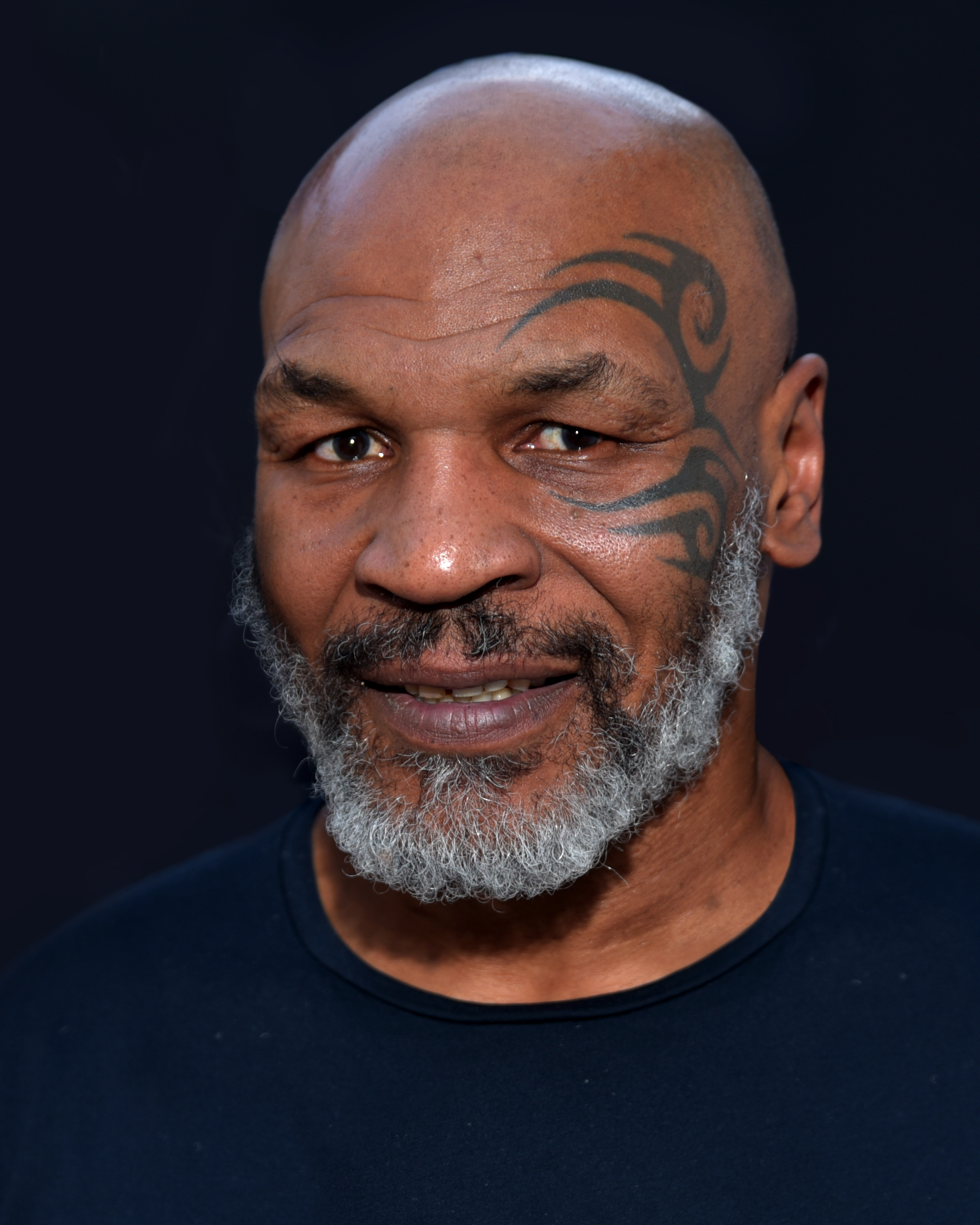
Mike Tyson

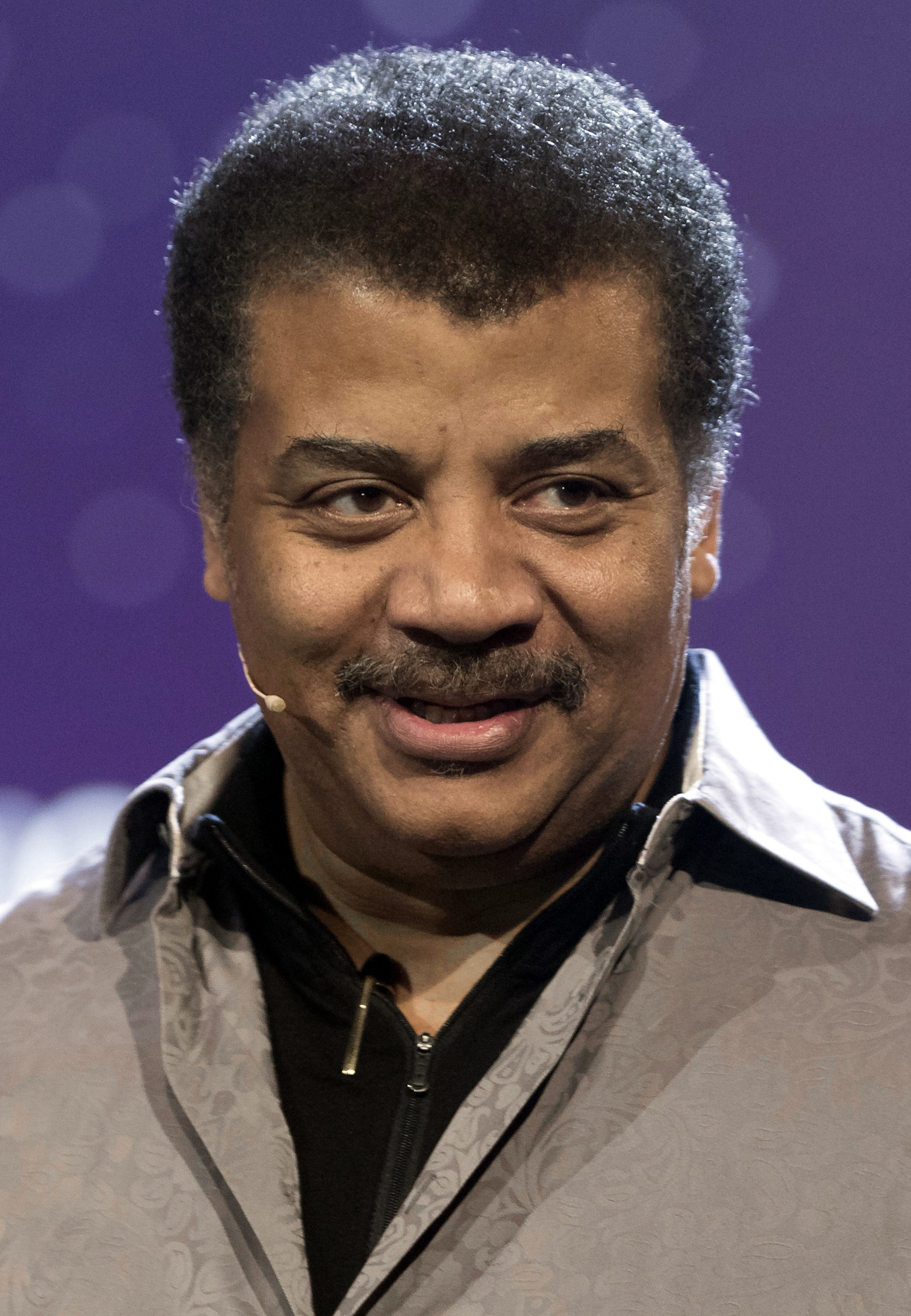
Neil deGrasse Tyson

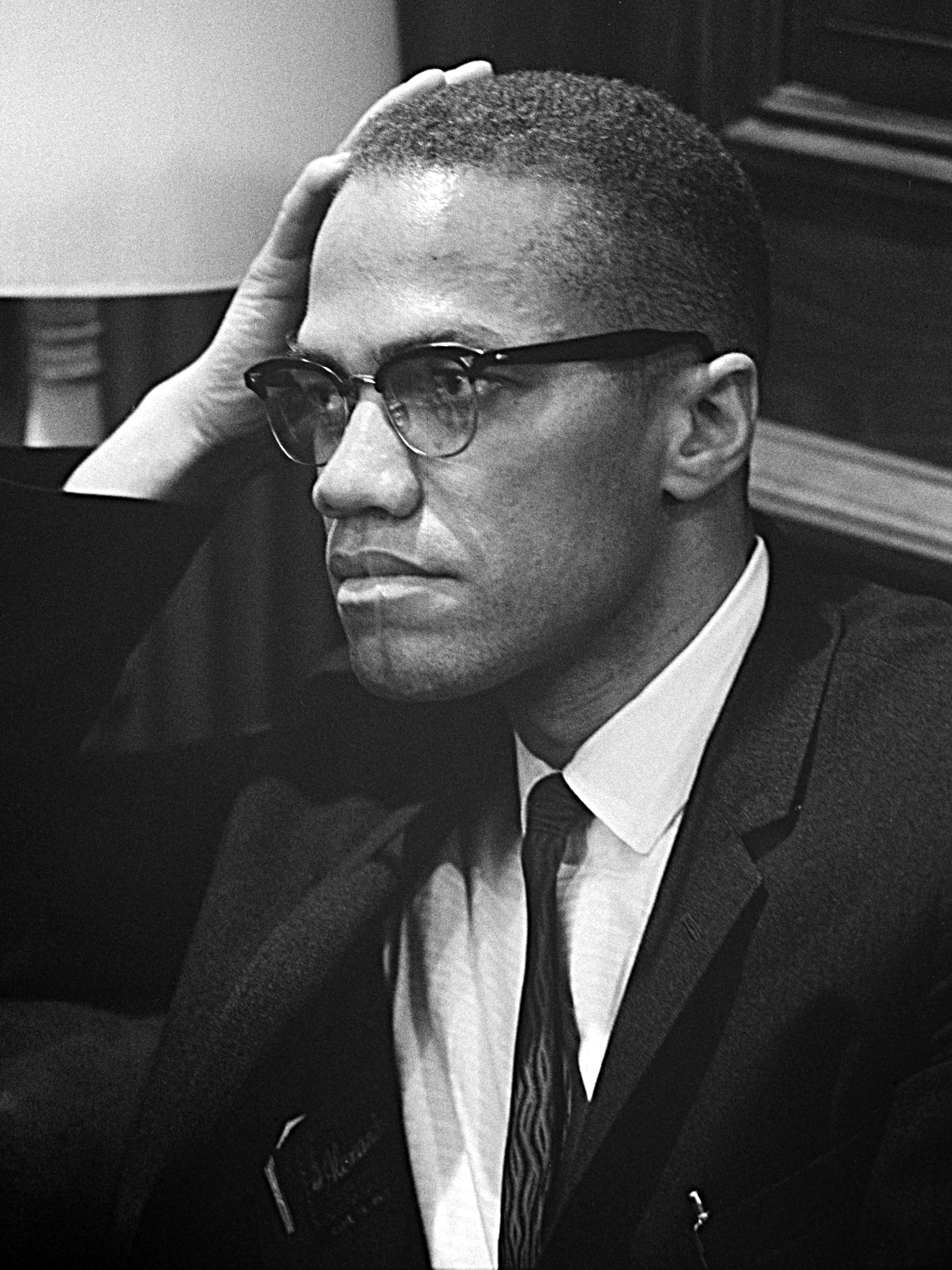
Malcolm X

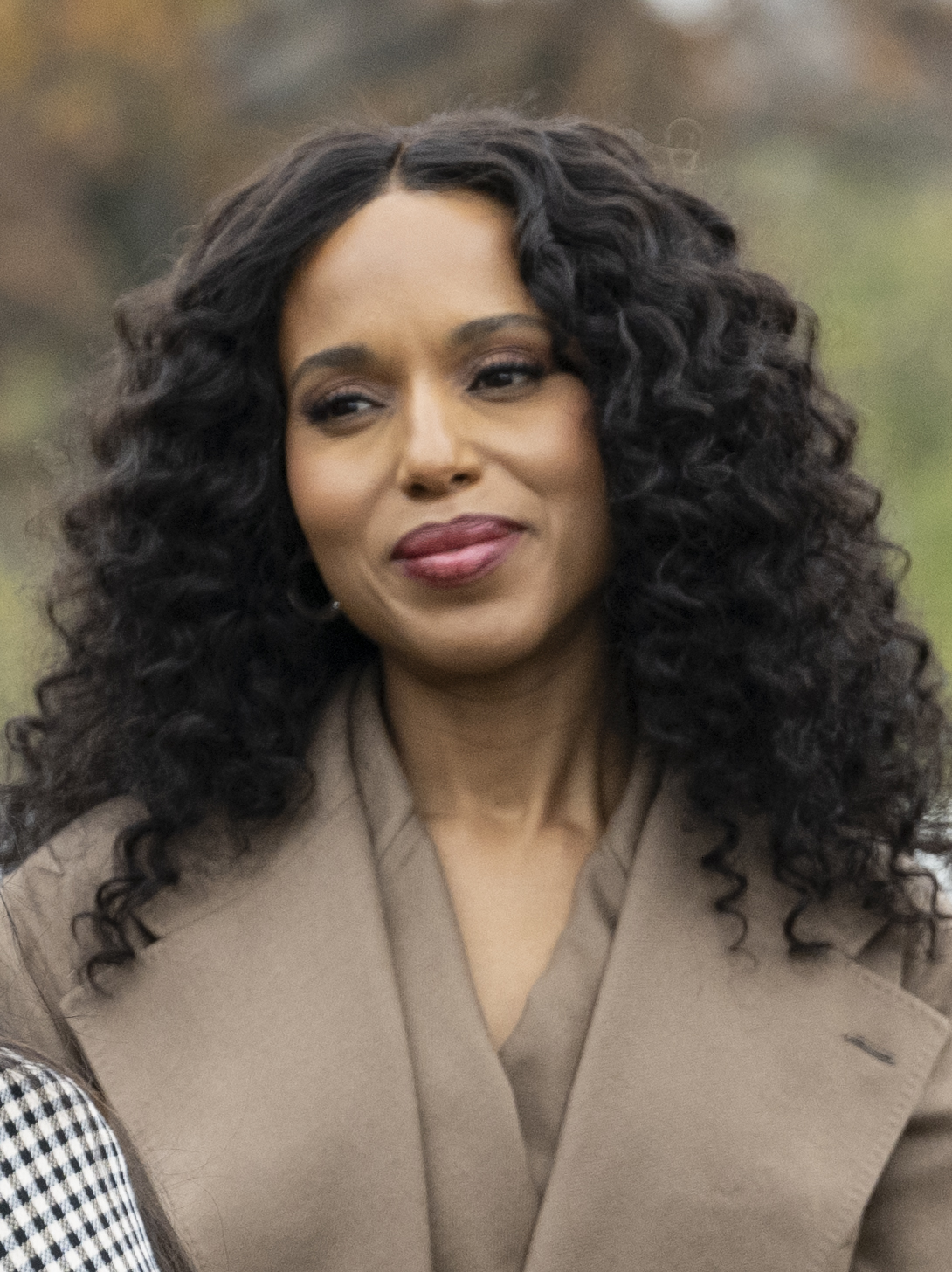
Kerry Washington

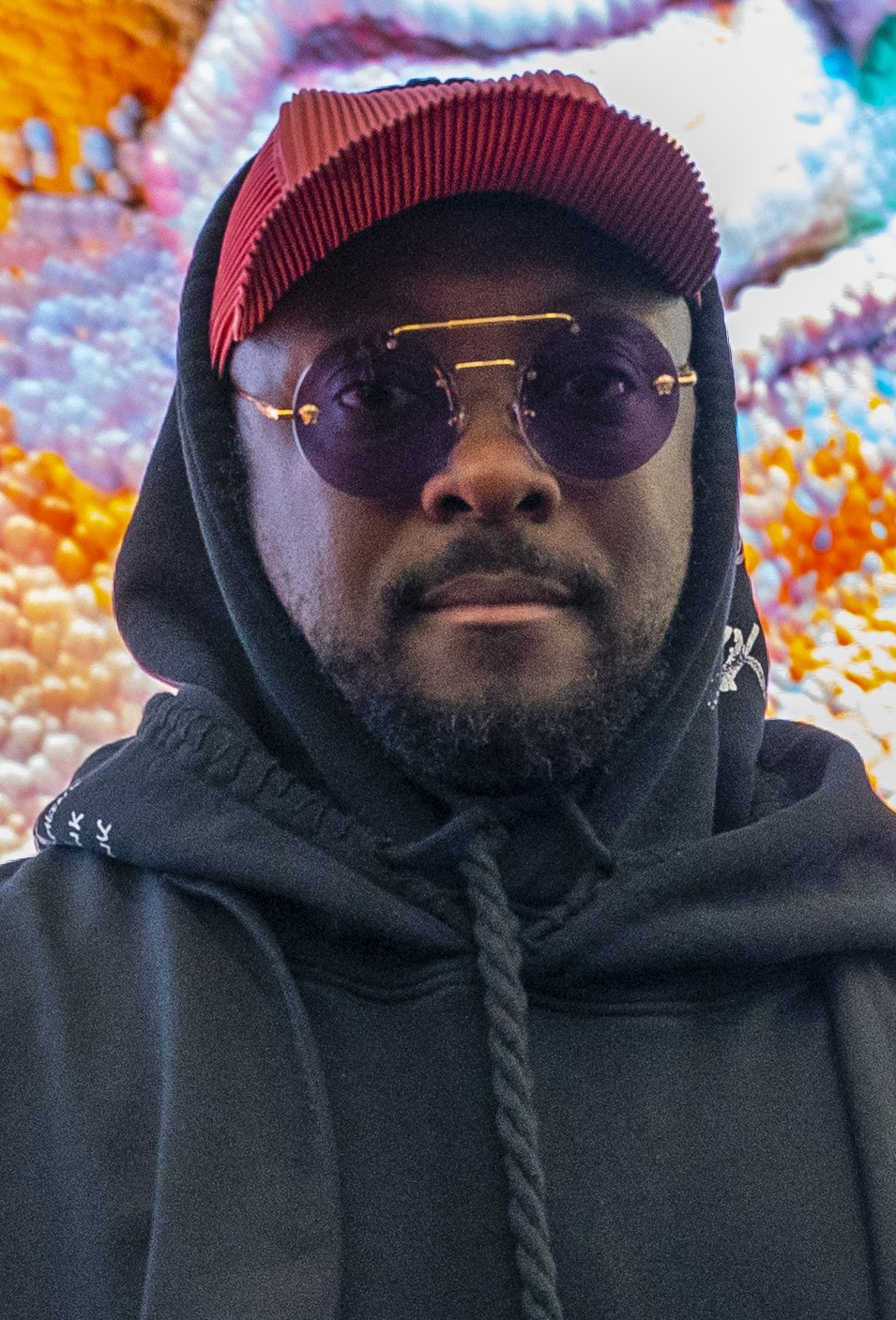
will.i.am

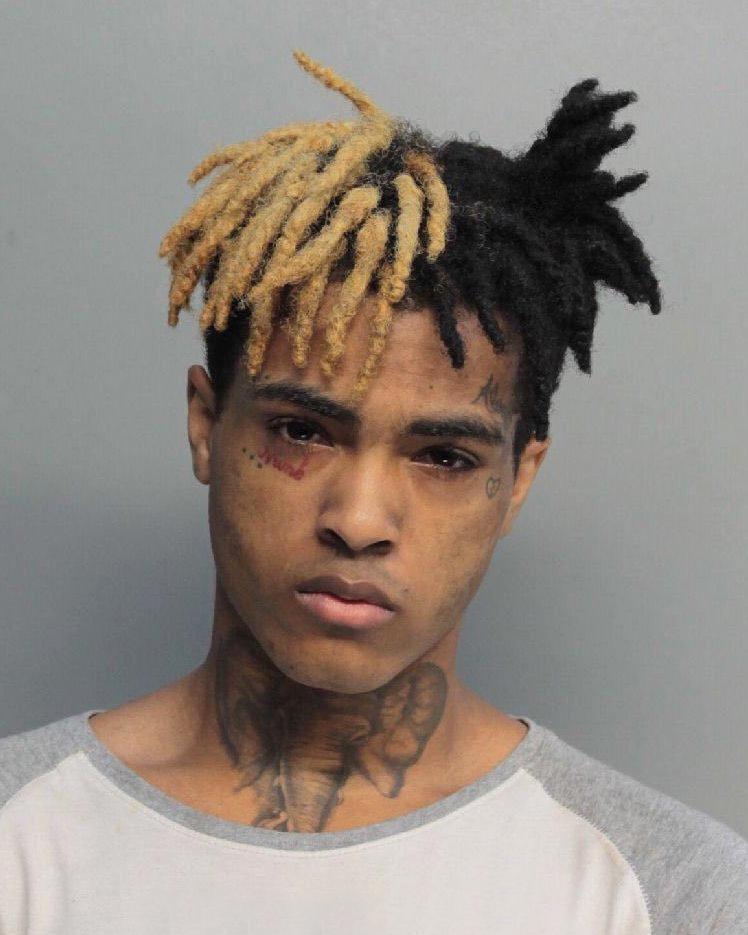
XXXTentacion

== National Caribbean American Heritage Month ==
National Caribbean American Heritage Month is celebrated in June. The heritage month was first officially observed in 2006, after being unanimously adopted by the House of Representatives on June 27, 2005, in H. Con. Res. 71, sponsored by Congresswoman Barbara Lee, recognizing the significance of Caribbean people and their descendants in the history and culture of the United States. The Senate adopted the resolution on February 14, 2006, which was introduced by Senator Chuck Schumer of New York. On June 5, 2006, George W. Bush issued a presidential proclamation declaring than June be annually recognized as National Caribbean American Heritage Month to celebrate the contributions of Caribbean Americans (both naturalized and US citizens by birth) in the United States. Since the declaration, the White House has issued an annual proclamation recognizing June as National Caribbean-American Heritage Month.

The Institute of Caribbean Studies (ICS), based in Washington DC, is the lead organization behind the campaign that led to the establishment of Caribbean American Heritage Month. The ICS was founded by Dr. Claire Nelson in 1993.

== See also ==
- List of West Indian communities in the United States
- Caribbean immigration to New York City
- Labor Day Carnival
- Calle Ocho Festival
- Little Havana
- West Indies Federation
- Hispanic and Latino Americans
- Indo-Caribbean Americans
- Model Minority
- Chinese Caribbean people
